= French philosophy =

Philosophy in the French language

French philosophy is philosophy in France, by French people, and in the French language, a part of French culture. French philosophy includes several schools of thought and has influenced Western philosophy for centuries. It includes the medieval scholasticism of Peter Abelard, the founding of modern philosophy by René Descartes, the 18th century Enlightenment philosophes who influenced the French Revolution, 19th century eclecticism, spiritualism, socialism, and positivism; and 20th century continental philosophy such as Bergsonism, philosophy of science, phenomenology, existentialism, structuralism, poststructuralism, and postmodernism.

== Medieval period ==
French philosophy begins in the medieval period with authors writing in Latin, brought by the Romanization of Gaul and Gallo-Roman culture. Cassiodorus (ca. 490–585) cites in his book Variae (dated 526) a letter to king Athalaric: "Finally you found Roman eloquence in regions that were not originally its own; and there the reading of Cicero rendered you eloquent where once the Gaulish language resounded." Christian monk Gennadius of Massilia (died c. 496) wrote Of Church Doctrine (De Ecclesiasticis Dogmatibus), long attributed to Saint Augustine.

=== Ratramnus ===
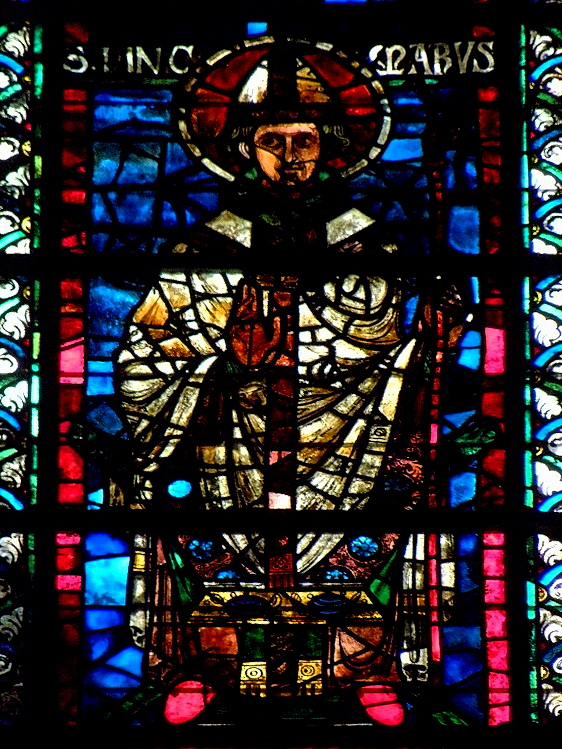
Representation of Hincmar on a stained glass window in the Saint-Remi basilica of Reims.

Medieval philosophy was very much a part of Christian philosophy and theology. During the Carolingian Renaissance, Ratramnus (d. c. 868) defended Gottschalk of Orbais' (808–868) views on double predestination, a controversy throughout Francia in the 9th century.

Ratramnus also later supported Gottschalk in his conflict with archbishop Hincmar (806–882) of Rheims, advisor to Charles the Bald. Hincmar of Rheims altered a hymn, changing the words trina deitas (triune God) for summa deitas (supreme God). Gottschalk accused Hincmar of Sabellianism, and Hincmar accused Gottschalk of Arianism.

Ratramnus also wrote Against the Objections of the Greeks who Slandered the Roman Church, a response to the Photian schism (863–867) and defense of the filioque addition to the Niceno-Constantinopolitan Creed.

=== Gaunilo ===
The Benedictine monk of Marmoutier Abbey and empiricist Gaunilo is well known for his work In Behalf of the Fool. (Note: The title of Gaunilo's book repeats Anselm's use of the fool mentioned in the Psalms who doubts the existence of God (Psalm 14:1 and Psalm 53:1).) Gaunilo objects to Saint Anselm of Canterbury's (1033–1109) ontological argument for the existence of God found in Anselm's Proslogion (c. 1078). Gaunilo contends as a reductio that the same argument proves the existence of "the most perfect island". Lanfranc (c. 1010–1089) and Anselm were Benedictine monks at Bec Abbey.

=== Nominalism ===
Medieval philosophy was also concerned with the problem of universals inherited from antiquity. Roscellinus (c. 1050–c. 1121) defended nominalism, stating universals are merely an emission of sound (flatus vocis). Among Roscellinus' supporters was Raimbert of Lille.

Roscellinus also stated the three persons of the Trinity were not one substance, arguing if they were then God the Father and the Holy Spirit would have become incarnate along with God the Son. This prompted Anselm's On Faith in the Trinity. (Note: Full title De Fide Trinitatis et de Incarnatione Verbi Contra Blasphemias Ruzelini (On Faith in the Trinity and on the Incarnation of the Word Against the Blasphemies of Roscelin).)

In 1092/1093, a council convoked at Soissons by the archbishop of Reims condemned his interpretation and accused Roscellinus of tritheism. Roscellinus recanted his theological beliefs, but later returned to professing them.

=== Platonism ===
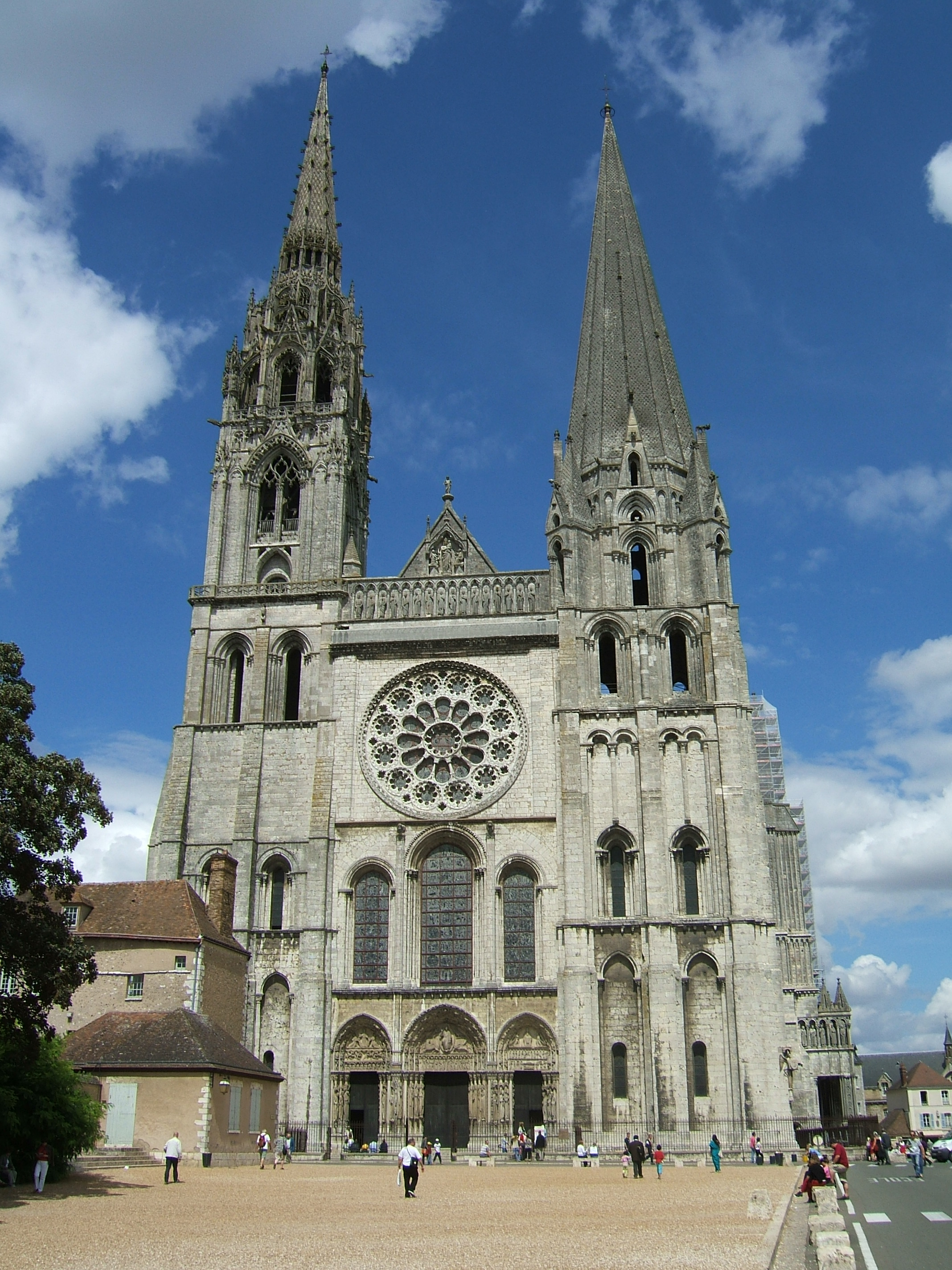
Cathedral at Chartres

Anselm of Laon (d. 1117) studied under Anselm at Bec and was a leading proponent of philosophical realism who helped to pioneer biblical hermeneutics. William of Champeaux (c. 1070–1121) studied under Roscellinus and Anselm of Laon, and was also a proponent of realism. William was a friend of mystic Bernard of Clairvaux (1090–1153).

==== Chartres ====
The philosophers of the cathedral school at Chartres were at the forefront of an intellectual climate of the High Middle Ages now known as the twelfth-century Renaissance, pioneering the Scholastic philosophy that came to dominate European medieval philosophy. Known as Chartrains, they promoted scholarship and Platonism, such as found in the Timaeus.

Ivo of Chartres (c. 1040–1115) was a student of Anselm at Bec. The best known philosophers at Chartres included Bernard (d. c. 1125) and Thierry (d. c. 1150) of Chartres, and Gilbert of Poitiers (c. 1086 –1154).

Gilbert of Poitiers studied under William of Champeaux, Anselm of Laon and Bernard of Chartres. Gilbert's views on the Trinity were controversial, contending the divine essence of God exists separately, and so he was condemned for teaching a "quaternity."

William of Conches (c. 1090–c. 1154) studied under Bernard. Herman of Carinthia (c. 1105–c. 1155) and Clarembald of Arras (c. 1110–c. 1187) were among Thierry's students.

==== Indifferentism ====
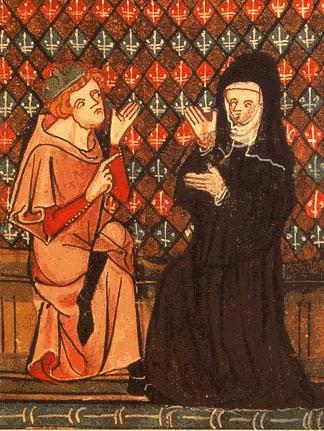
Peter Abelard and Heloïse in a manuscript of the Roman de la Rose (14th century)

William of Champeaux was also the teacher of Walter of Mortagne (c. 1100–1174), leader of the "indifferentists", a type of platonist who attempts to avoid the more extreme forms of platonism, and according to whom the universal it itself indifferent, changing according to points of view. Raimbert's nominalism was attacked by Odo of Tournai (1060–1113).

=== Aristotelianism ===
==== Peter Abelard ====
Peter Abelard (1079–1142) was a scholastic philosopher, theologian and logician who taught at the cathedral schools of Paris. The Chambers Biographical Dictionary describes him as "the keenest thinker and boldest theologian of the 12th Century". He wrote Sic et Non (c. 1121) and fixed more decisively than anyone before him the scholastic manner of philosophizing. Abelard was also expelled by Anselm of Laon, and clashed with his master William of Champeaux, and opposed by Alberic of Paris. Abelard is also notable for his love affair and collaboration with Héloïse (1101–1164).

Abelard helped to establish the authority of Aristotle's logic. Abelard distinguished between de dicto modal sentences and de re modal sentences. Abelard also defended conceptualism on the problem of universals. Abelard further showed a great interest in ethics, writing Ethics (1139).

Abelard amended Augustine's doctrine of original sin. The Vatican and Pope Innocent III accepted the view that unbaptized babies did not, as at first believed, go straight to Hell but to a special area of limbo, limbus infantium. They would therefore feel no pain, but no supernatural happiness either, because they would not be able to see the deity who created them.

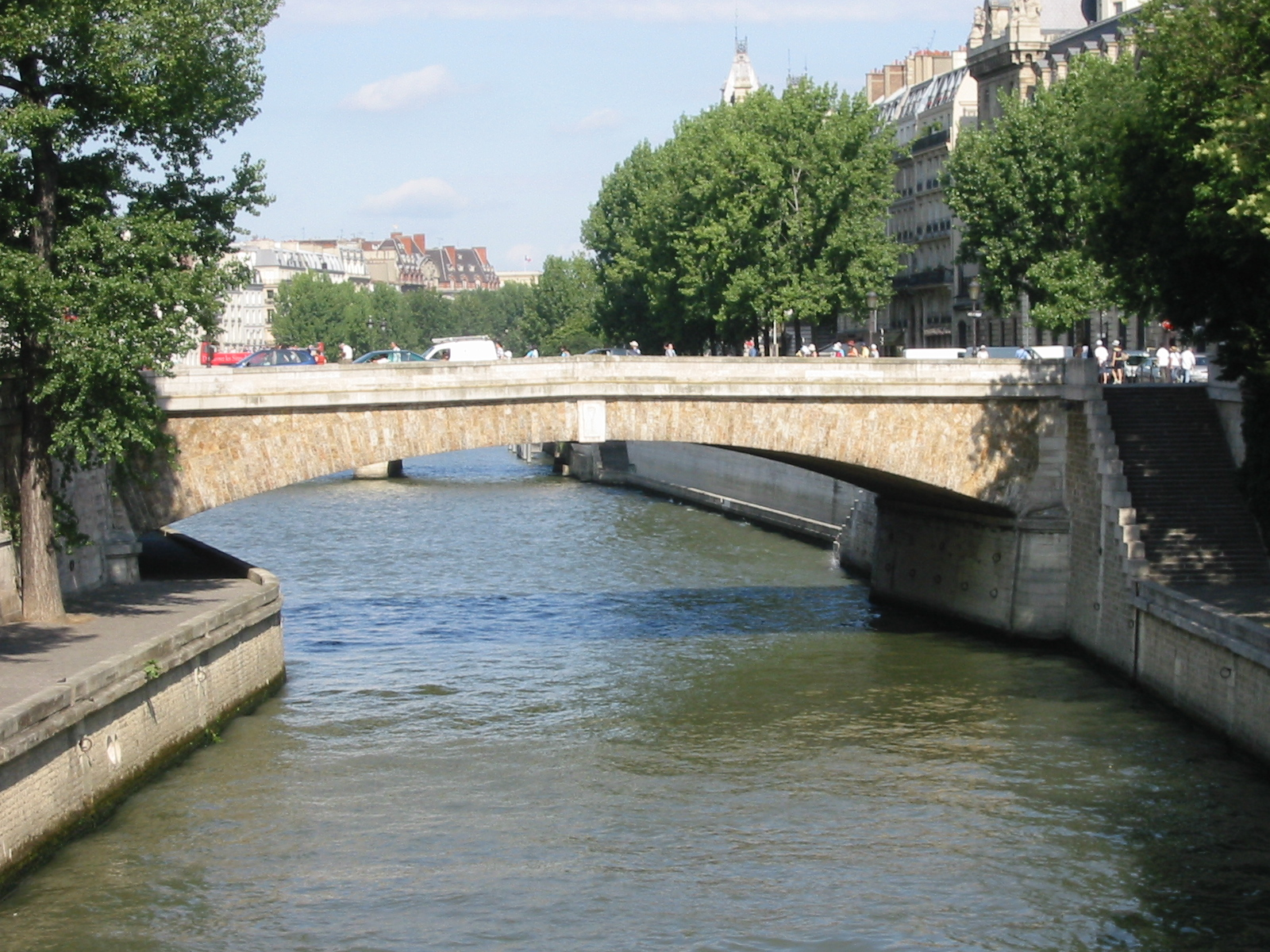
Petit-Pont as it looks today.

Abelard's lectures attracted students from across Europe, helping prepare the founding of the University of Paris a few decades after his death. The patronage of Italian Peter Lombard (c. 1096–1160) by Odo, bishop of Lucca, who recommended him to Bernard of Clairvaux, allowed him to leave Italy and further his studies at Reims and Paris. Lombard became Bishop of Paris and is author of the Sentences (c. 1150).

The Petit Pont school introduced the new logic, and included Adam of Balsham (c. 1100–c. 1157), who studied with Lombard, and William of Soissons, who coined the principle of explosion.

The Summa aurea of William of Auxerre (1150–1231) shows a debt to Lombard. Bishop of Paris William of Auvergne (c. 1185–1249) extensively engaged with Aristotle. Franciscan John of La Rochelle (c. 1200–1245) taught at Paris.

John of La Rochelle's students include Italian Saint Bonaventure. Italian and founder of the Aristotelian Thomist school Thomas Aquinas (c. 1225–1274) taught at Paris. John of Paris (c. 1255–1306) defended Aquinas.

==== Condemnation of 1277 ====
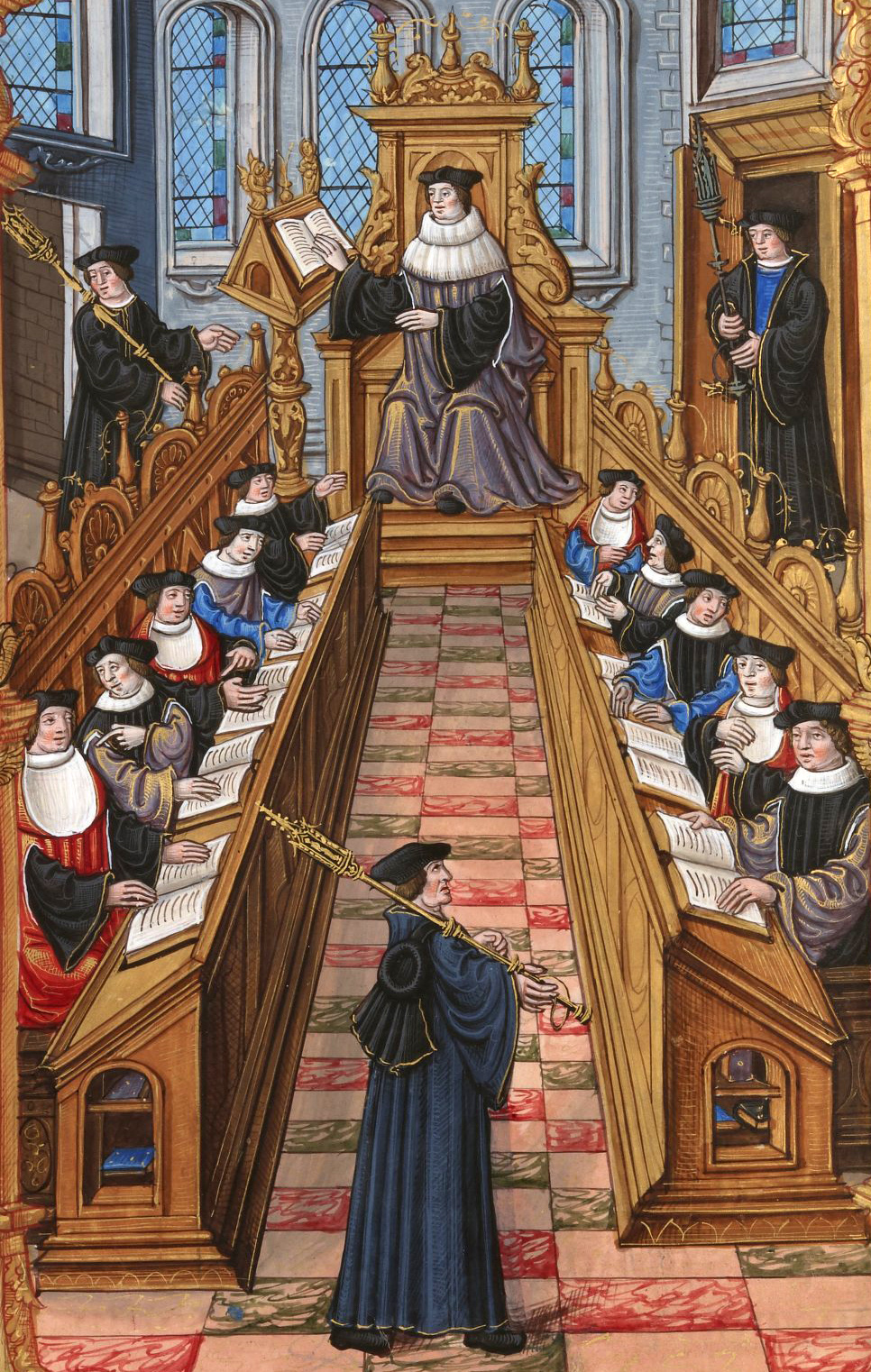
A 16th-century miniature showing a meeting of doctors at the University of Paris

The Condemnations of 1210–1277 at the recently founded Sorbonne, Étienne Tempier deemed Aristotle's Physics to be heresy, opening the door to modern science by questioning ancient science. Averroists Siger of Brabant (c. 1240–c. 1284) and Boethius of Dacia have been singled out as the most prominent targets of the 1277 censure. John of Jandun (c. 1285–1328) was a later Averroist.

The enigmatic Gerard of Brussels probably published his pioneering study of kinematics On Motion some time in the 13th century. Lambert of Auxerre was a contemporary logician.

==== Jewish philosophy ====
A number of Jewish philosophers were in Southern France in the Middle Ages, such as Samuel ibn Tibbon (c. 1150–c. 1230), who wrote Biur meha-Millot ha-Zarot (1213), an explanation of the philosophical terms of Guide for the Perplexed (c. 1190) by Maimonides, which seeks to reconcile Aristotelianism with Rabbinical Jewish theology. Gersonides (1288–1344) was a rigid Aristotelian.

=== Llullism ===
Catalan Ramon Llull (c. 1232–c. 1316) visited Paris in the 1280s and Llullism became popular. Llulism is a philosophical system known as 'the Art' which propounds a belief in the unity of Christianity influenced by neoplatonism.

While Llull was not himself an alchemist, a number of works on alchemy were attributed to him, as well as to Arnaldus de Villanova (c. 1240–1311). Influenced by Joachim of Fiore, Arnaldus claimed in On the Coming of the Antichrist (1288) that in 1378 the Antichrist would come and the world would end. He was imprisoned and the Sorbonne ordered his works to be burned. Both Llull and Villanova had some influence on alchemist John of Rupescissa (c. 1310–c. 1368), known for aqua vitae.

=== Ockhamism ===
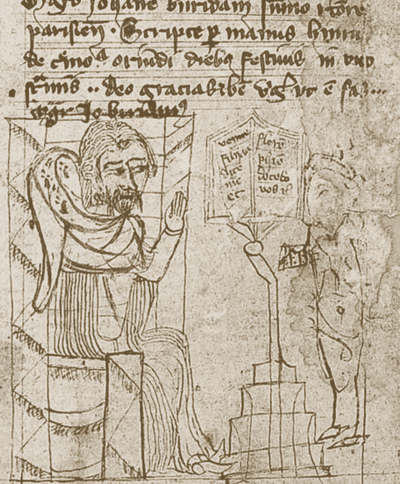
Jean Buridan

The nominalist beliefs of British philosopher William of Ockham were banned in Paris in 1339. Despite this his views proved influential.

==== Jean Buridan ====
Jean Buridan (c. 1301–c. 1360) was a nominalist who is the namesake for Buridan's ass. Buridan criticized Aristotle's Physics, which could not explain e. g. why an arrow in flight continues to move once leaving the bow. Buridan in response developed the theory of impetus, a precursor to inertia.

Buridan was also one of the foremost logicians of the later Middle Ages, writing the textbook Compendium of Dialectic, influenced by Peter of Spain. For 200 years after Buridan, little was said about syllogistic logic.

==== Nicole Oresme ====
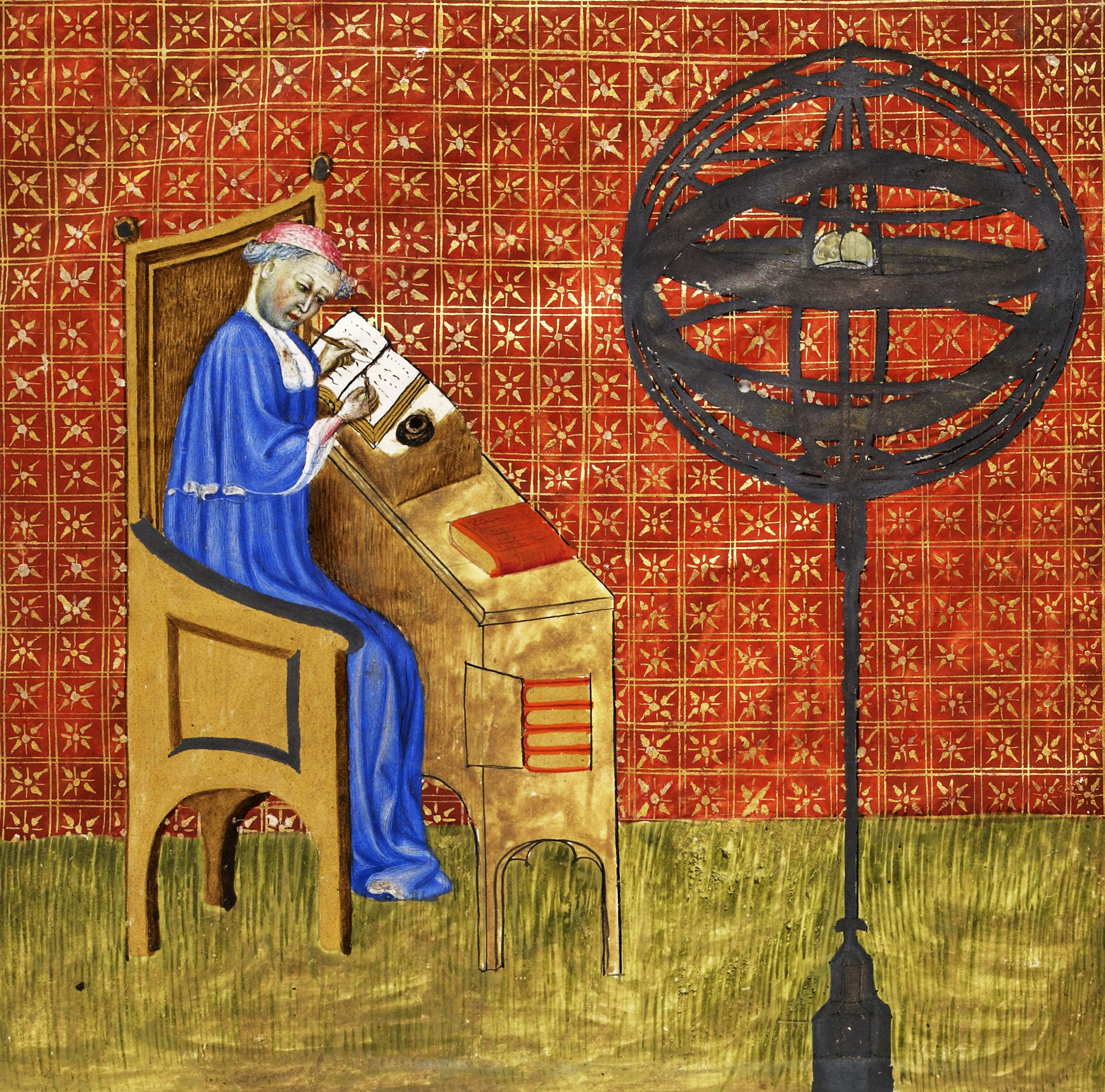
Nicole Oresme. Miniature from Traité de l'espère, Bibliothèque Nationale, Paris, France (c. 1410)

Nicole Oresme (1325–1382) studied with Buridan. Together they studied acceleration or "uniformly difform motion".

Oresme was a counselor of King Charles V, and his astronomical commentary on Aristotle's On the Heavens anticipated Copernicus with arguments that the Earth rotates. Oresme also criticized Aristotelian notions of space and time, considering time independent of motion, influenced by, (or at least agreeing with) Peter John Olivi (1248–1298) and Gerardus Odonis (1285–1349).

Oresme also contributed to economics and followed Aristotle in arguing against usury, even though Oresme said inflation was worse. His opposition to usury was shared by Thomists like Giles of Lessines (c. 1230–c. 1304), as well as Giles of Rome (c. 1243–1316) student and Italian Gerard of Siena (c. 1295–1336), and Peter John Olivi and Gerardus Odonis; and his master Buridan. Buridan and Oresme supported a metallist theory of money.

==== Condemnations of 1347 ====
The nominalist and skeptical views of Nicholas of Autrecourt (c. 1299–1369) and John of Mirecourt, known as Monachus Albus ('the White Monk'), were condemned as heresy in 1347. Both wrote commentaries on the Sentences; and both rejected causality and Aristotelian substance theory. Mirecourt influenced Peter Ceffons.

==== Pierre d'Ailly ====
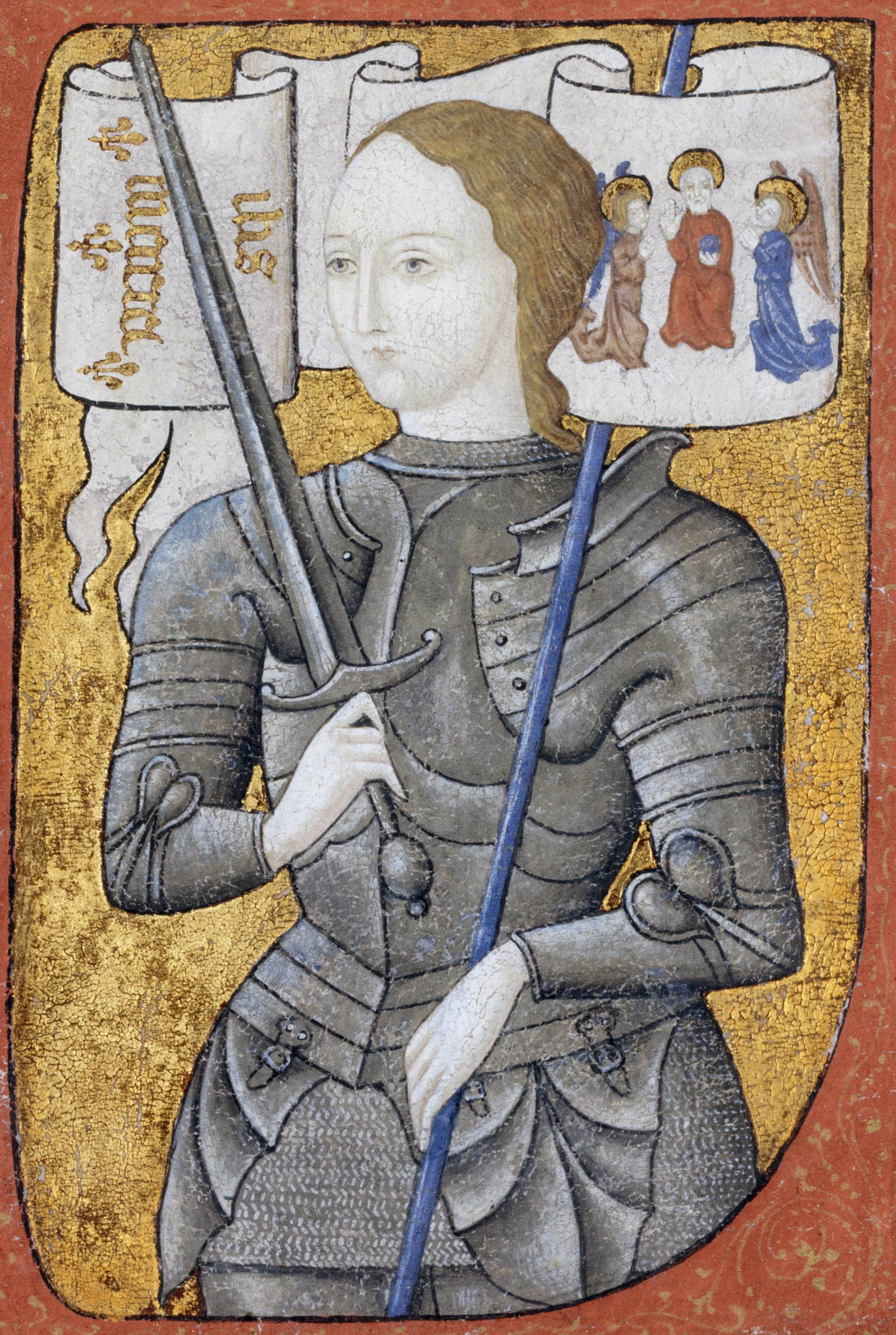
Jean Gerson defended Joan of Arc.

Pierre d'Ailly (1351–1420) was a nominalist who taught the Sentences. His pupils were Jean Gerson (1363–1429) and Nicholas of Clémanges (c. 1360–1440). All three philosophers were embroiled in the Western Schism of 1378, and taught Ockham's conciliar theory. Jean Gerson developed natural rights theory, and also defended the divine mission of Joan of Arc.

=== Raymond Sebond ===
University of Toulouse professor and physician Raymond Sebond (1385–1436) opposed the Ockhamists and was influenced by Llull. He attempted to reconcile reason and faith. Raymond declares that the Book of Nature and the Bible are both divine revelations. Sebond wrote the posthumously published Theologia naturalis (1484).

== 16th century ==
=== Humanism ===
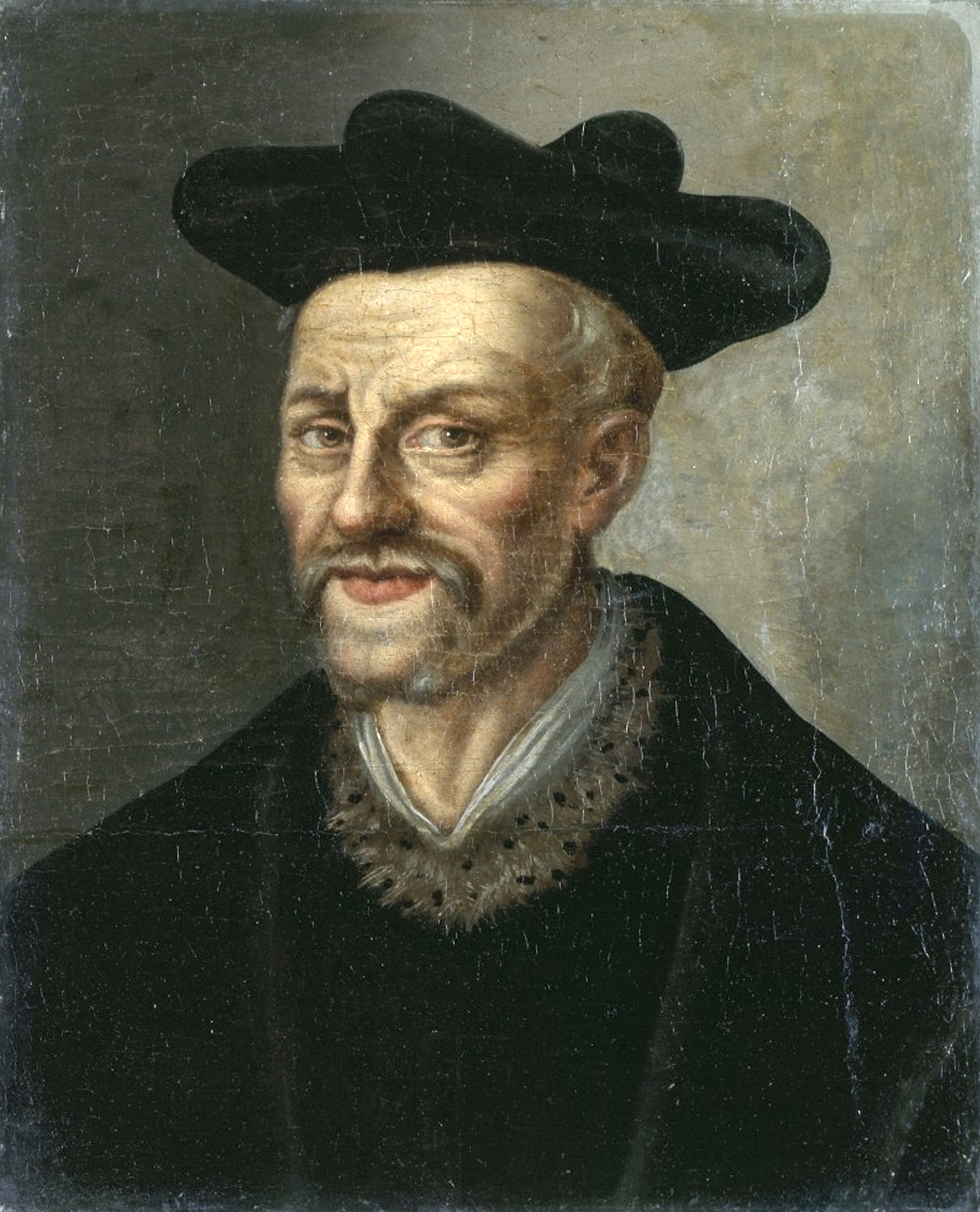
Rabelais

Italian Renaissance humanist Gregory Tifernas was the first teacher of Greek in France at the University of Paris in 1458. Guillaume Fichet (1433–c. 1480) and Robert Gaguin (1434–1501) are usually seen as the first French humanists.

Fontainebleau librarian Guillaume Budé (1467–1540), Gargantua and Pantagruel author François Rabelais (c. 1490–1553), and astrologer and seer Nostradamus (1503–1566) were other French humanists. Rabelais contributed to French philosophy a belief in hedonistic man uncorrupted by institutions, and ridiculed Pyrrhonism in Gargantua and Pantagruel's third book (1546).

=== Ramism ===
Logician and education reformer Petrus Ramus (1515–1572) wrote Everything that Aristotle has said is false (1536). The Ramists distrusted human thought and put faith in intuitive logical relations. The Dialogues (1557) of Ramist Guy De Bruès (b. c. 1530) entertained skepticism. After Ramus's death, followers such as Banosius and Nancelius produced biographies. Ramism had a lasting influence in Europe and even New England.

=== Reformation ===
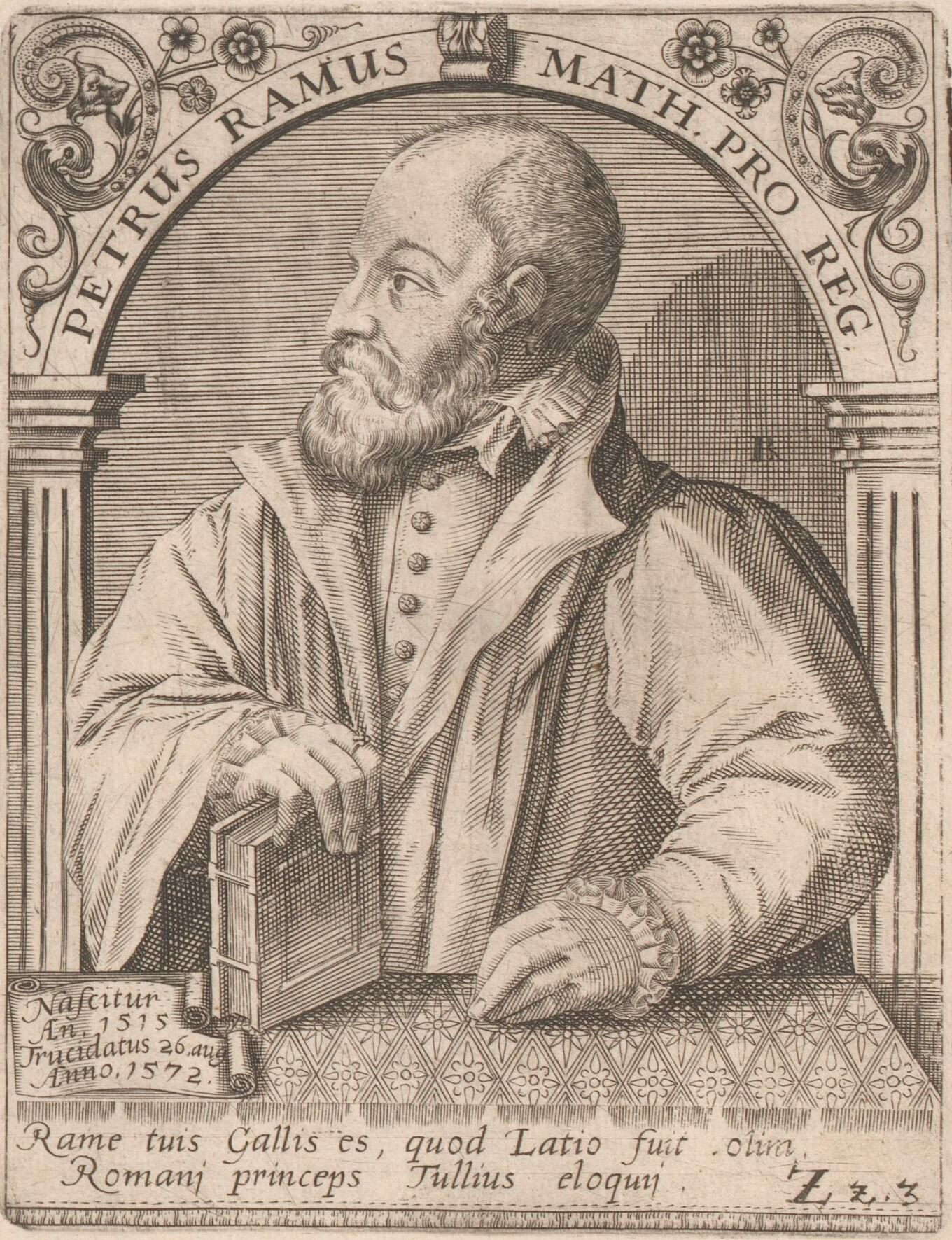
Petrus Ramus

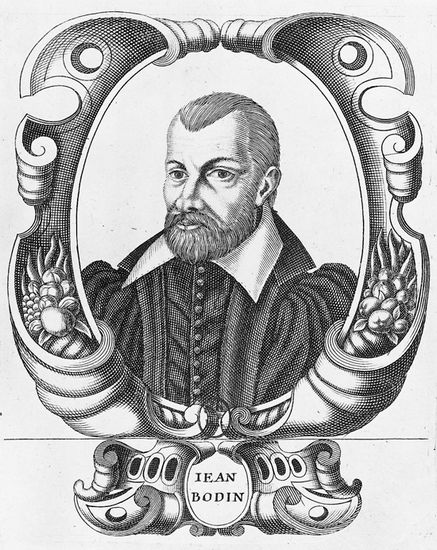
Jean Bodin

Following the Reformation, France saw a Protestant movement, such as the Huguenots, led by Genevan John Calvin (1509–1564), author of Institutes of the Christian Religion (1536). Calvinism affirms predestination and salvation through God alone (monergism). Calvin also advanced the sensus divinitatis, an innate divine awareness of God's presence.

William Farel (1489–1565) influenced Calvin, and was influenced by Llullist and humanist Jacques Lefèvre d'Étaples (c. 1455–c. 1536).

Jean Bodin (c. 1530–1596) was critical of papal authority, preferring the sovereignty of an absolute monarch during the Wars of Religion (1562–1598). Ramus converted to Protestantism and was a victim of the St. Bartholomew's Day massacre (1572). Budé's family fled from France.

=== Skepticism ===
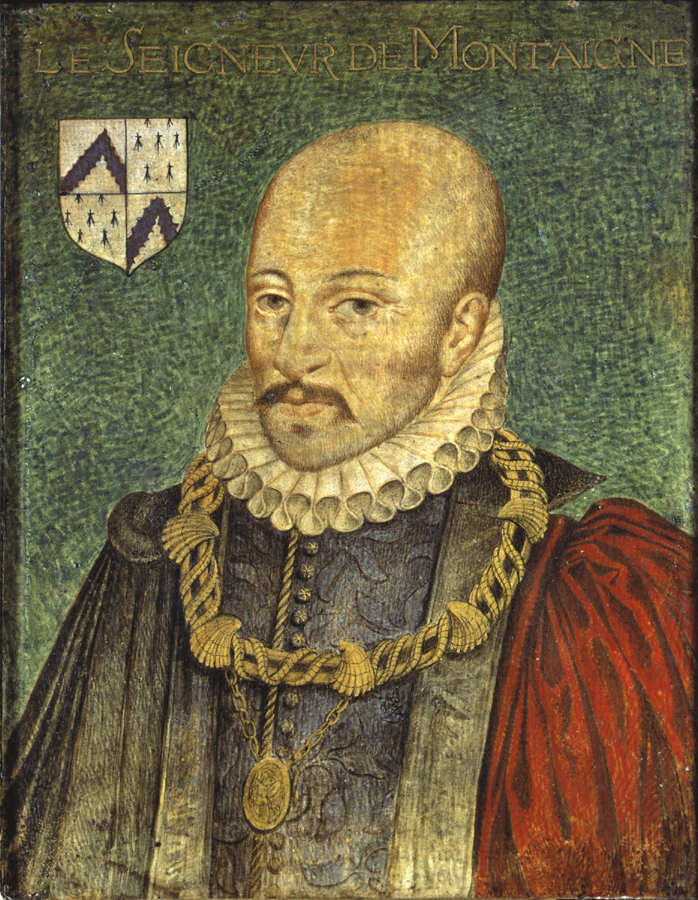
Montaigne was a skeptic.

Parisian printer Henri Estienne (1531–1598) transmitted the first Latin translation of ancient Pyrrhonian skeptic Sextus Empiricus in 1562. Estienne's father Robert (1503–1559) was a Protestant convert and the "father of French lexicography", writing Latin and French dictionaries.

==== Montaigne ====
Michel de Montaigne (1533–1592) was a skeptic, summed up in his personal motto of Que sais-je? ("what do I know?") His highly influential writing style consists of essays ('attempt', he coined the term) first published in 1580, filled with autobiographical and casual anecdotes.

Montaigne's best known skeptical essay is the circuitous Apology for Raymond Sebond, which recapitulates much from Sextus Empiricus, while defending Christianity and the cosmological argument. Montaigne maintains beasts and savages are better off than people. He propounded cultural primitivism in Of Cannibals.

Montaigne was friends with political philosopher Étienne de La Boétie (1530–1563), author of the posthumously published Discourse on Voluntary Servitude (1577). Montaigne also influenced moralist François de La Rochefoucauld (1613–1680).

==== Charron ====
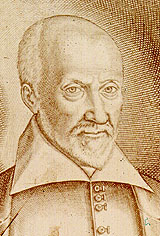
Pierre Charron followed Montaigne.

Montaigne's follower was the Parisian and neostoic Pierre Charron (1541–1603), who was also influenced by Guillaume du Vair (1556–1621). Charron is notable for On Wisdom (1601), which argued that ethics could be separated from religion, and that one attacks reason to boost faith and wisdom. Charron also wrote The Three Truths (1594), in which Charron sought to prove that God exists, Christianity is true, and the true church is Roman Catholicism. Francis Garasse (1585–1631) criticized Charron, believing he thought only nature was needed for wisdom and guidance.

==== Sanches ====
University of Toulouse professor Francisco Sanches (c. 1550–1623) published the skeptical That Nothing Is Known (1581). While Sanches does not develop the idea, he states the need for a method based on indubitable inner experience.

== 17th century ==
France in the early modern period became the cultural center of Europe, especially under the reign of "Sun King" Louis XIV, and saw a number of prominent philosophers. Louis XIV's tutor was libertine François de La Mothe Le Vayer (1588–1672). Libertines were such skeptics that they believed the more knowledge, the more grief. (Note: Ecclesiastes 1:18) Philosophy at this time often sought to reconcile dogmatism and skepticism.

=== René Descartes ===
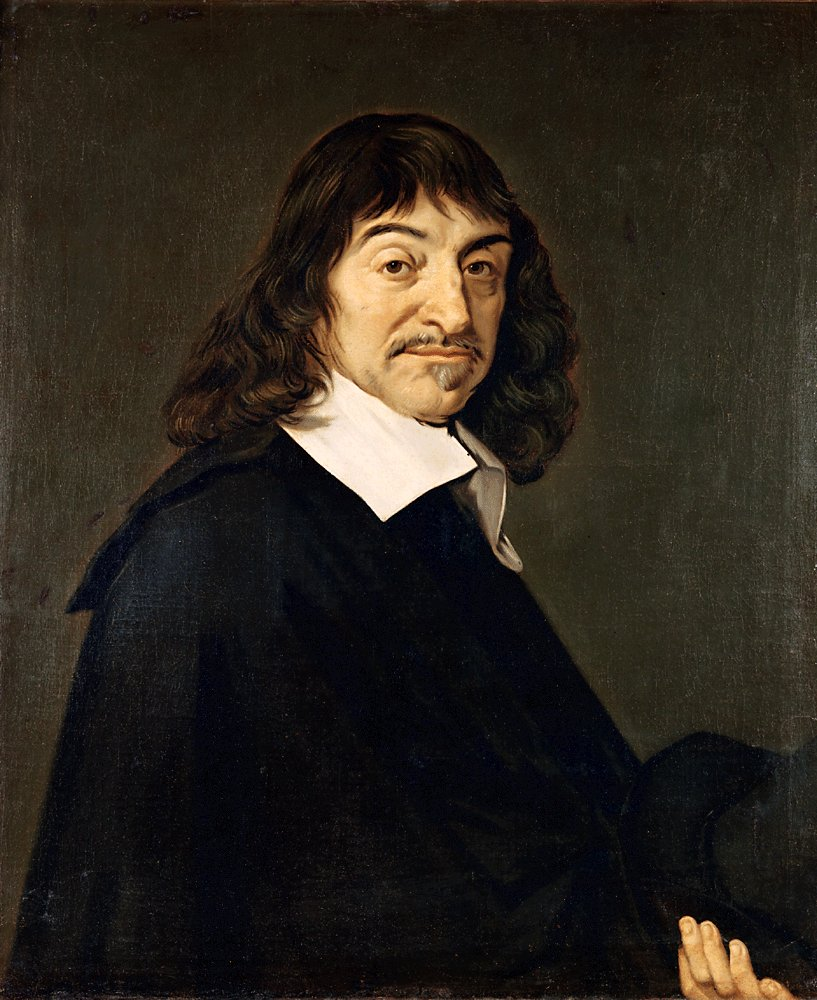
René Descartes is considered the founder of modern philosophy.

Modern philosophy began in France with René Descartes (1596–1650), who raised problems central to 17th century thought. An expat who lived in the Dutch Republic, he studied at the Jesuit school La Flèche and was a pioneer of mathematics and the Scientific Revolution.

Descartes founded a mechanistic philosophy known as Cartesianism which incorporated his Cartesian physics. Cartesianism was also rationalist and dualist, supported in works like Meditations on First Philosophy (1641) and Discourse on Method (1637). The three great rationalists of early modern philosophy are Descartes, Baruch Spinoza, and German philosopher Gottfried Wilhelm Leibniz (1646–1716).

It is often said Descartes changed the primary object of philosophy from ontology to epistemology. Concerned with the recent spread of skepticism, Descartes desired to find indubitable ground on which all the sciences could be placed and progressively built. Thus he doubted anything he could and accepted only certain (or apodeictic) knowledge as truth.

After invoking the possibility of dreaming to doubt the information from the senses and the external world, and further of an omnipotent deceiver to reject mathematics and logic, Descartes discovered at least one thing could be known for certain. Even if he doubted everything, if he himself was doubting, then he had to exist. Thus Cogito Ergo Sum—I think, therefore I am. This became his first principle.

Descartes claimed since the Cogito is perceived "clearly and distinctly", anything similarly clear and distinct must be true. Then he argues one can conceive of an infinite being, but finite beings cannot produce infinite ideas and hence an infinite being must have put the idea into his mind. He uses this ontological argument to invoke the existence of a benevolent God as the indubitable foundation making all sciences possible.

==== Jansenist controversy ====
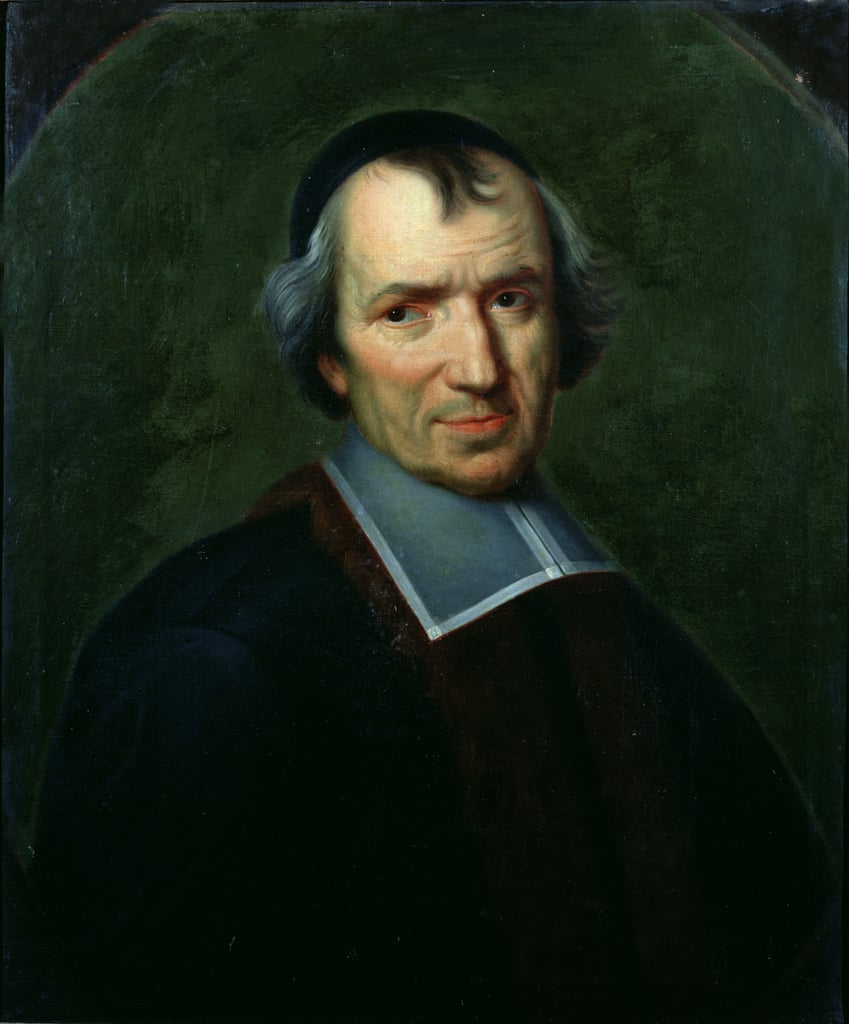
Antoine Arnauld was a Cartesian Jansenist.

Cartesianism attracted several followers such as Jansenist solitaires Antoine Arnauld (1612–1694), Pierre Nicole (1625–1695), and Claude Lancelot (c. 1615–1695). Arnauld and Lancelot produced the Port-Royal Grammar (1660); and Arnauld and Nicole produced the Port-Royal Logic (1662), the "most influential logic book after Aristotle and before the end of the nineteenth century". In 1649, Nicolas Cornet (1572–1663) sought the condemnation of five propositions from Cornelius Jansen's Augustinus. Arnauld defended the Jansenists.

Cornet's student Jacques-Bénigne Bossuet (1627–1704) supported the king's revocation of the Edict of Nantes (Edict of Fontainebleau, 1685), abolishing the rights of the Protestant minority. Bossuet also banned the work of Oratorian Richard Simon (1638–1712), who was influenced by Pre-Adamite theorist Isaac La Peyrère (1596–1676).

Other Cartesians were physiologist Louis de La Forge, Géraud de Cordemoy, Claude Clerselier, University of Paris professor Edmond Pourchot, recollect Antoine Le Grand, mystic Pierre Poiret, physicist Jacques Rohault, Bernard de Fontenelle, Robert Desgabets, Pierre-Sylvain Régis, and François Poullain de la Barre.

François Poullain de la Barre (1647–1723) influenced Gabrielle Suchon (1632–1703), the first to produce a significant body of work solely on the topic of women. Claude Buffier (1661–1773) supported women's education.

==== Criticism ====
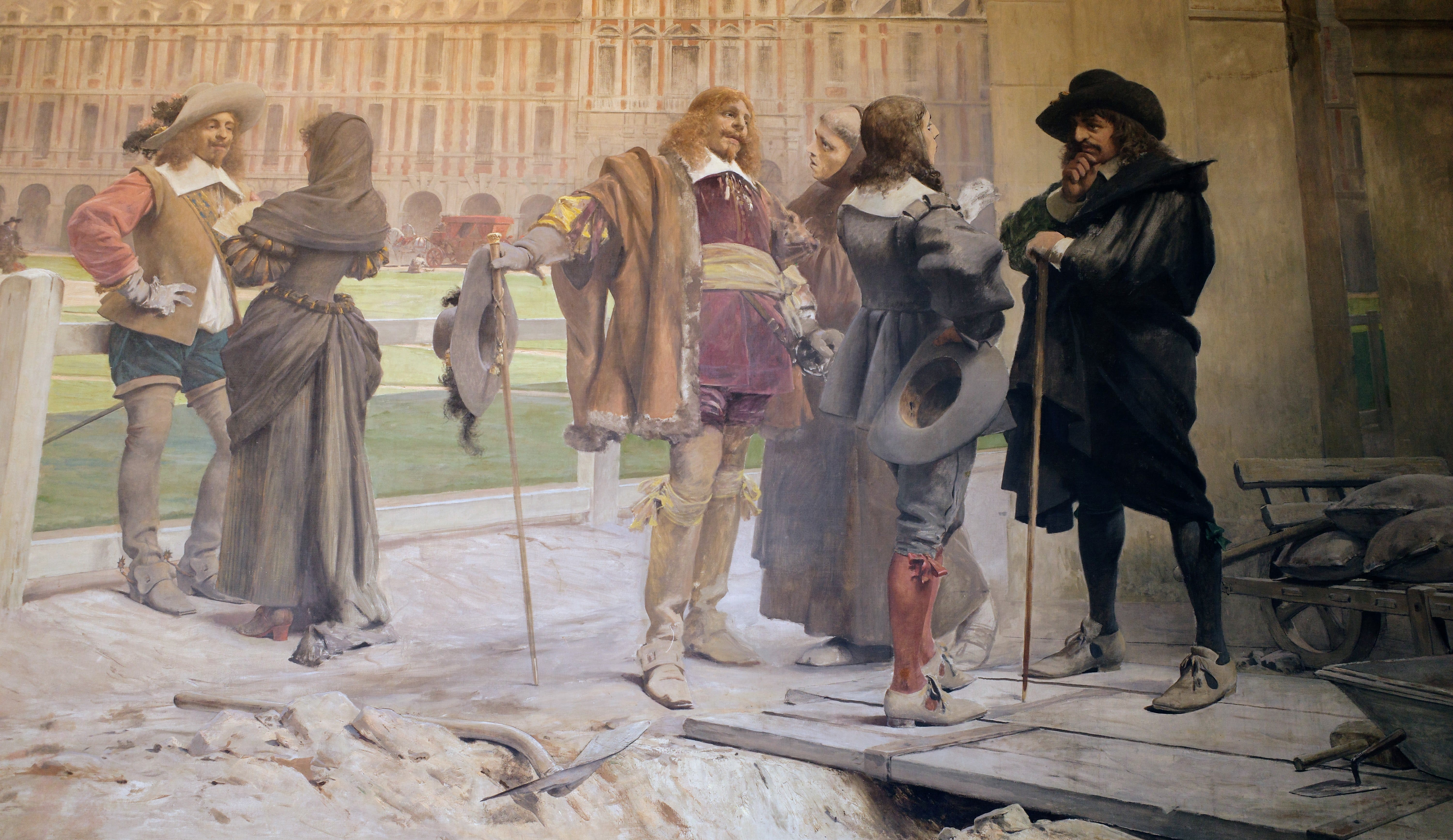
A scene of Desargues, Mersenne, Pascal, and Descartes at Place Royale in 1643, painted by Théobald Chartran (c. 1855)

While Descartes drew many followers, others were left unsatisfied. Some accused him of circularity, proclaiming his ontological argument uses his definition of truth as a premise, while his proof of his definition of truth uses his ontological argument as a premise.

Another famous problem arises from Descartes’ substance dualism; the interaction problem first pointed out by Princess Elizabeth of Bohemia. For Descartes, a substance can be conceived of as existing independently of anything else. He defined the mind as an unextended substance and the body as an extended substance. This raised the fundamental question of how it is possible that mind and body interact with one another. Descartes also held as a result of his dualism that animals were mere machines.

=== Marin Mersenne ===
The Minim and polymath Marin Mersenne (1588–1648) wrote The Truth of Science (1625), a dialogue between an alchemist, a skeptic and a Christian philosopher, the latter opposing both the over-confidence of the first and the excessive doubts of the second. The rest of the book is an 800 page compilation of mathematics to prove there is knowledge immune from doubt. (Note: Mersenne influenced architect François Blondel.)

Mersenne is notable as the father of acoustics and the namesake for Mersenne primes. He was "the center of the world of science and mathematics during the first half of the 1600s," and, because of his ability to make connections between people and ideas, "the post-box of Europe". As well as in France, Mersenne corresponded with scholars in the Dutch Republic, England, and Italy, including Constantijn Huygens, Thomas Hobbes, and Galileo Galilei.

=== Blaise Pascal ===
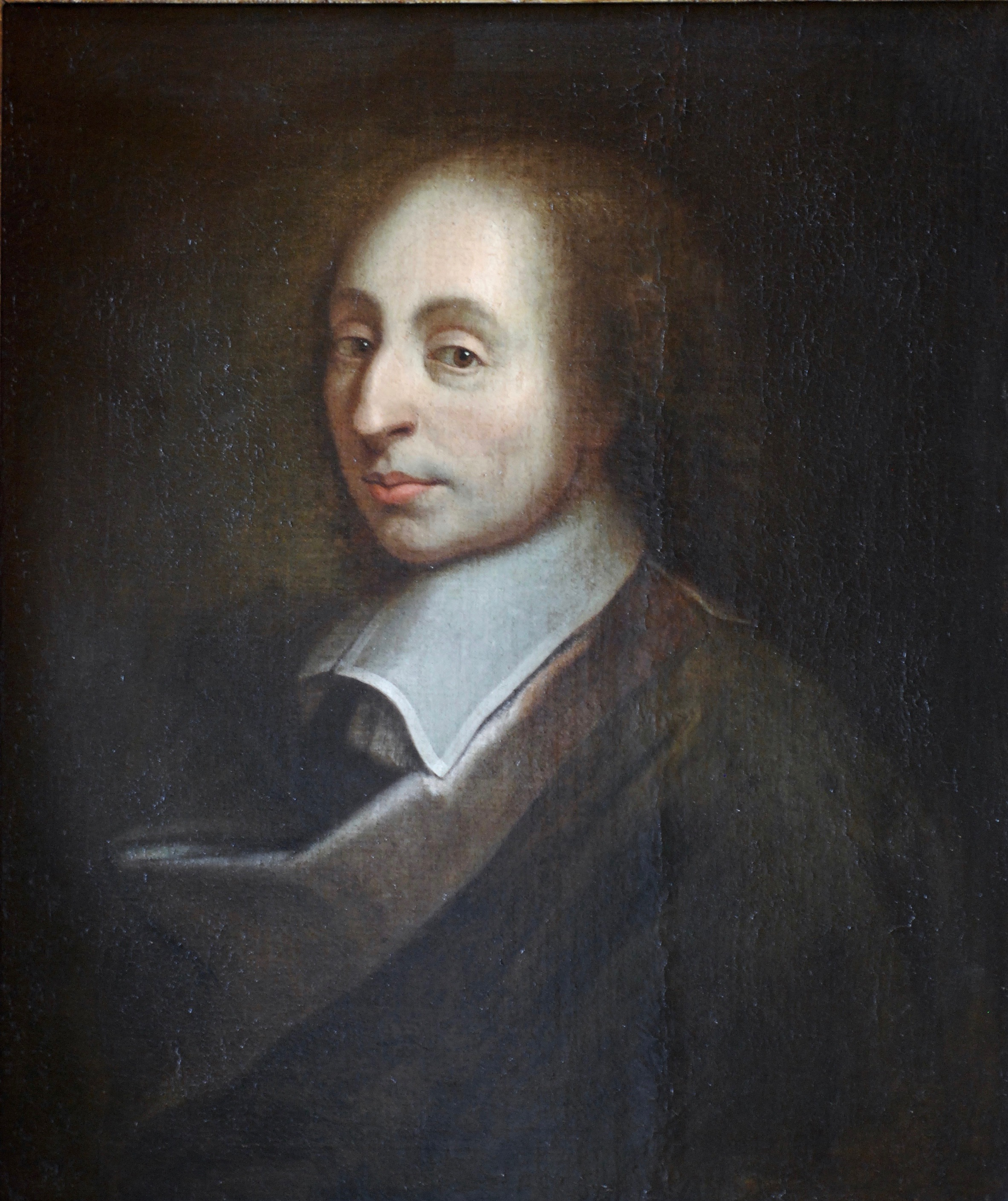
Blaise Pascal was a fideist.

Blaise Pascal (1623–1662) was a child prodigy mathematician and scientist who grew increasingly religious. Pascal was a vacuuist who repeated the barometric mercury experiments of Italian Evangelista Torricelli, while Descartes was a plenist who held "nature abhors a vacuum".

Pascal is known for defending Jansenism and Arnauld in Provincial Letters (c. 1657). When Jacques-Bénigne Bossuet was asked which work he wished he had written aside from his own, he answered the Provincial Letters.

Pascal was also a fideist, and distinguished between using the head and using the heart. His aphoristic collection Pensées (Thoughts, 1670) is a name given posthumously to fragments that Pascal had been preparing of an apology for Christianity, which was never completed. Pensées contains Pascal's Wager, (Note: Known as "the discourse on the machine" in the original.) an early application of the mathematics of probability, which states people engage in a life-defining gamble regarding the belief in the existence of God.

Pascal was a Cartesian dualist, illustrated with a quote from the Pensées: "Man is only a reed, the weakest in nature, but he is a thinking reed." However, his disagreements can be illustrated by his calling Descartes' philosophy "useless and uncertain".

=== Nicolas Malebranche ===
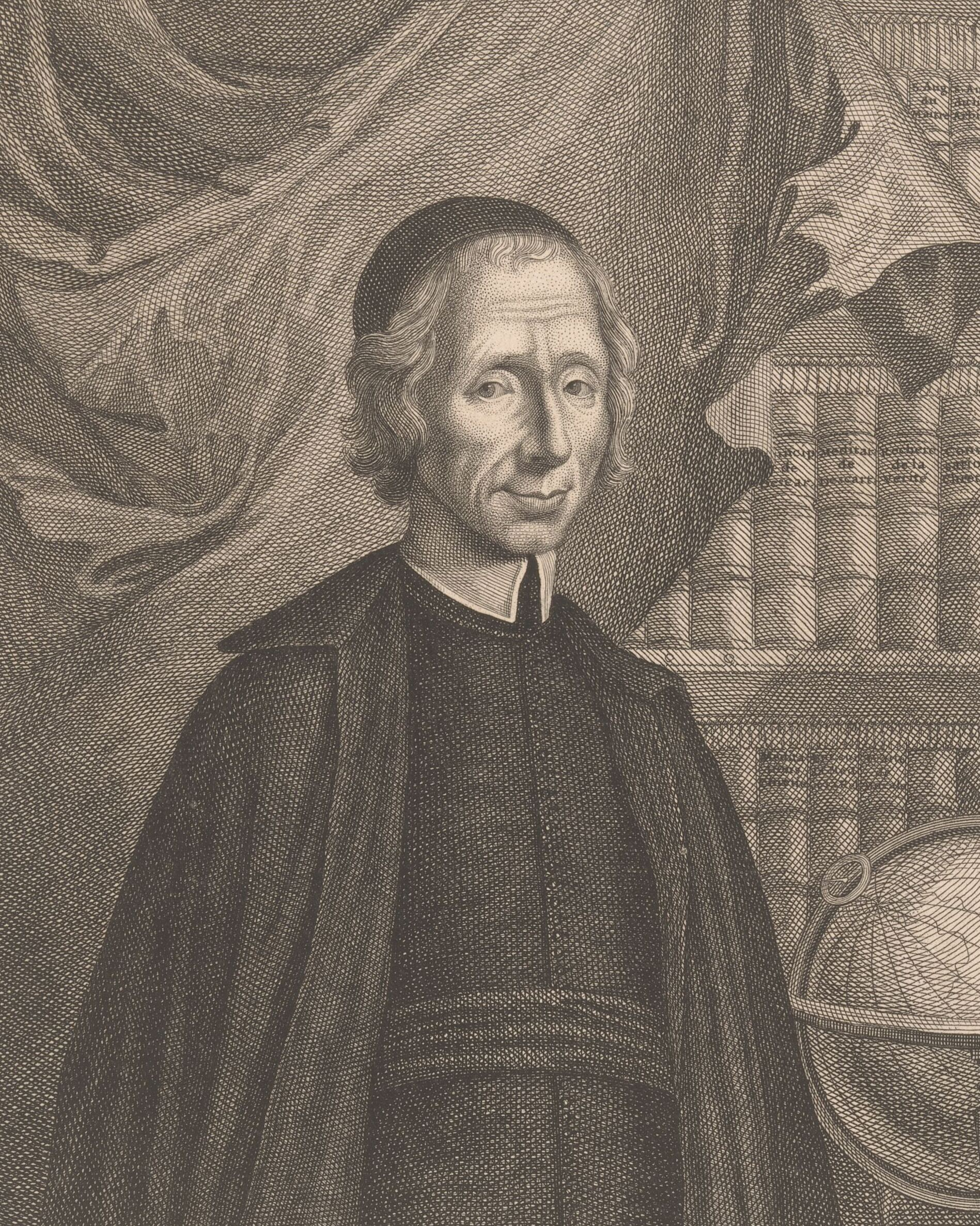
Nicolas Malebranche was a Cartesian occasionalist.

Cartesian Nicolas Malebranche (1638–1715) believed not even substances of the same kind could interact with each other, because no necessary causation could be perceived. He proposes then that it is God, an uncreated substance, who brings it about that each time one perceives a 'cause', one also perceives an 'effect'. Hence the doctrine is named occasionalism. This doctrine saw predecessors in Louis de La Forge (1632–1666), Géraud de Cordemoy (1626–1684), and the Flemish Arnold Geulincx.

Malebranche was well-known and celebrated in his own time, but has since become somewhat of an obscure figure. However, his philosophy had a direct influence upon Spinoza, and Scottish skeptic David Hume's questioning of causality, which awoke German idealist Immanuel Kant from his "dogmatic slumber."

=== Pierre Gassendi ===
Pierre Gassendi (1592–1655), the most influential anti-Cartesian in France, argued against innate ideas. Gassendi sought to revive the ancient atomism of Epicureanism, and was also a nominalist and a skeptic. Gassendi was an acquaintance of nominalist Thomas Hobbes. Gassendi was a member of the libertins érudits (free thinker) discussion group, which included playwright Cyrano de Bergerac, scholar Henri Louis Habert de Montmor, librarian Gabriel Naudé, and physician Guy Patin.

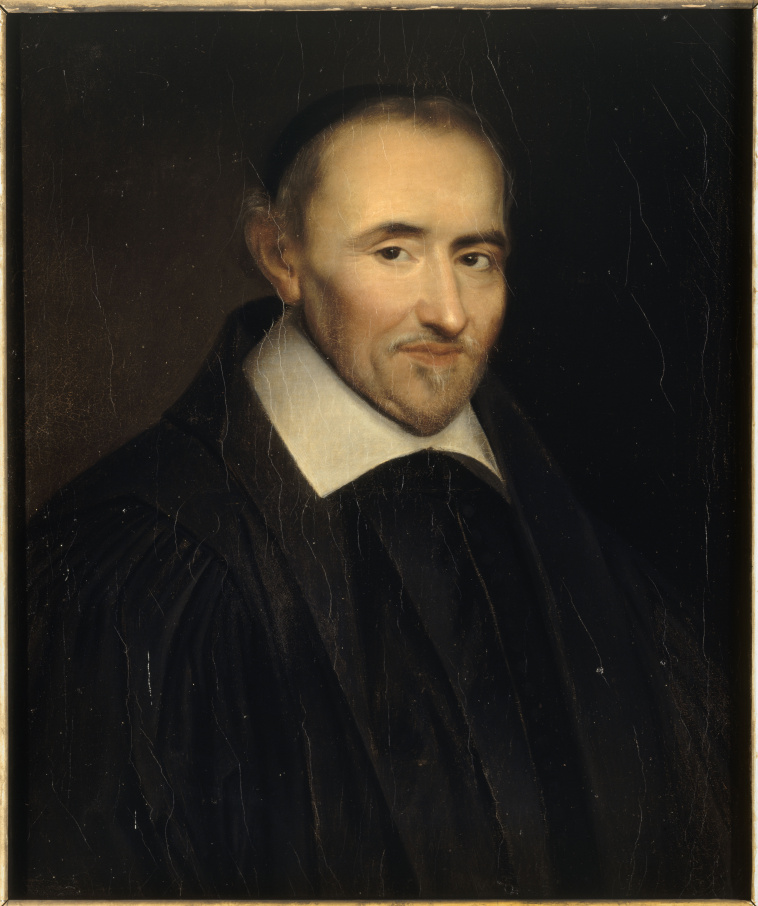
Pierre Gassendi was an anti-Cartesian.

Historian Richard Popkin states Gassendi was one of the first to formulate the modern "scientific outlook". Using the predictions of German Johannes Kepler's Rudolphine Tables (1627), Gassendi tracked the transit of planet Mercury across the Sun in 1631, projecting an image from a telescope onto a screen. (Note: Mercury was much smaller relative to the Sun than expected.) Gassendi's disciples included François Bernier (1620–1688) and Samuel de Sorbiere (1615–1670). Gassendi may have also influenced playwright Molière (1622–1673).

=== Simon Foucher ===
Academic skeptic Simon Foucher (1644–1696) opposed Descartes and Malebranche, arguing against representationalism in the philosophy of perception. Foucher wrote Dissertation on the Search for Truth (1673). Robert Desgabets (1610–1678) responded to Foucher. Desgabets quipped “Descartes is not always a good Cartesian.”

=== Pierre Huet ===
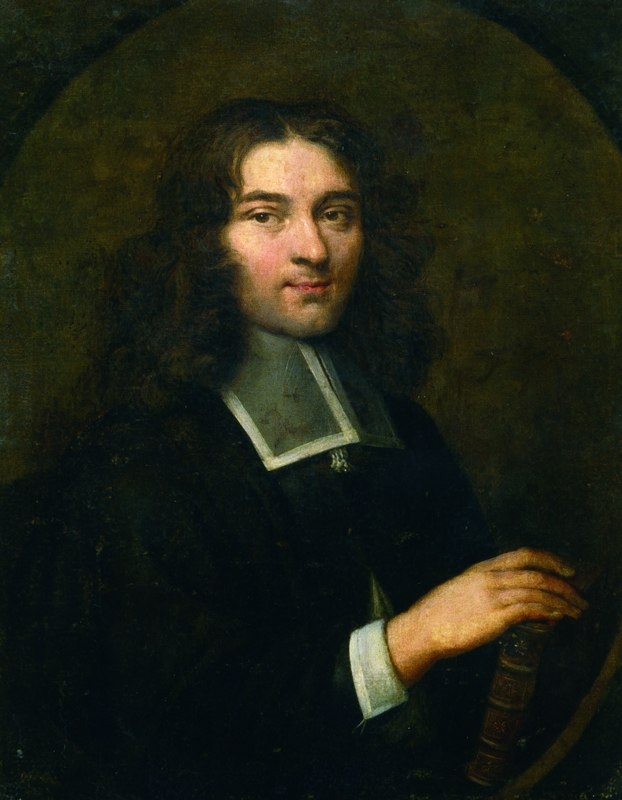
Pierre Bayle wrote the Historical and Critical Dictionary

Another influential critic of Descartes was churchman Pierre Daniel Huet (1630–1721), who worked as Bossuet's assistant, and wrote Censura philosophiae cartesianae (1689), arguing for a return to Christian skepticism. (Note: According to Maurice Rat, Huet "was after Ménage the best etymologist of his time". For example, it was he who understood that the final "bec" of certain toponyms of Normandy (such as Bec Abbey or Houlbec) means "stream" and is related to the German word of the same meaning "Bach", also present at the end of many toponyms.)

=== Pierre Bayle ===
Pierre Bayle (1647–1706) was a Huguenot at the Academy of Sedan, who fled to Rotterdam in the Dutch Republic, and wrote a biographical dictionary, the Historical and Critical Dictionary (1697). His views were dubbed "super skepticism" by Richard Popkin. Bayle would characterize his own views differently, stating "I know too much to be a Pyrrhonist, and I know too little to be a Dogmatist".

Bayle's comments on the problem of evil inspired Gottfried Wilhelm Leibniz, who wrote in Latin and French, to publish his Théodicée (1710). Leibniz was an optimist who believed God created the best of all possible worlds. Bayle was also an influence on David Hume.

== 18th century ==
The 18th century saw the French Enlightenment and nearby Swiss Enlightenment. French Enlightenment philosophers, known as philosophes, were deeply political, and many became critics of church and state, and promoters of rationality and progress. They had a deep influence on the politics and ideologies of both the American Revolution and the French Revolution. Marquis de Lafayette (1757–1834) supported both revolutions.

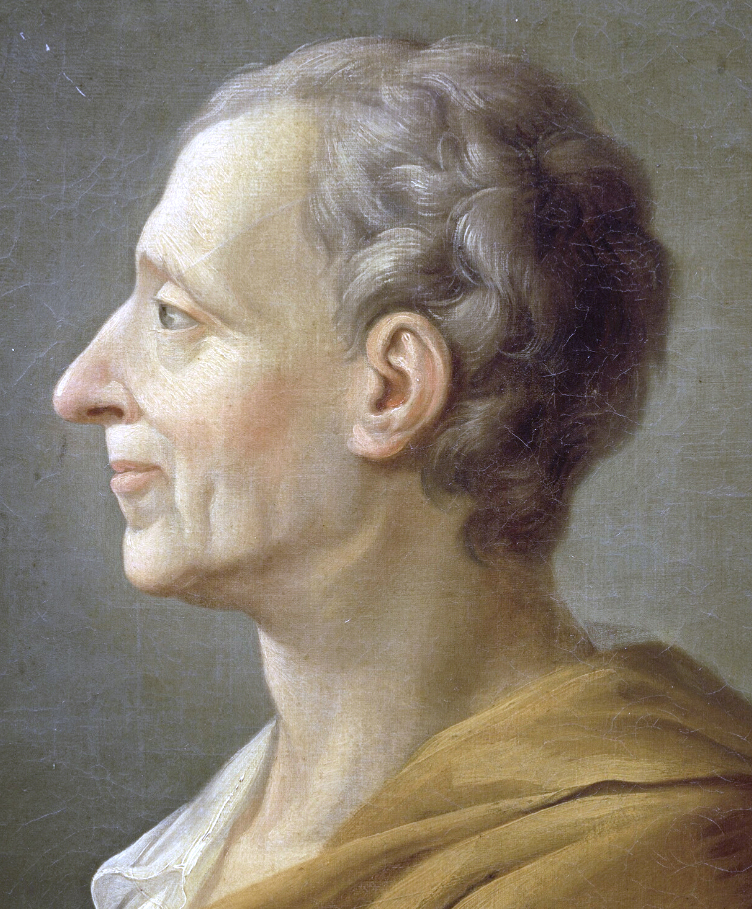
Baron de Montesquieu

Philosophy was discussed in salons, often led by salonnières such as Marie Thérèse Geoffrin, Madame Lambert, or Jeanne Julie Éléonore de Lespinasse.

=== Montesquieu ===
Charles de Secondat, baron de Montesquieu (1689–1755) deeply influenced the American Revolution. His belief that government powers should be separated into legislative, executive, and judicial branches formed the basis for separation of powers under the United States Constitution. In The Spirit of the Laws (1748), Montesquieu outlined the view that man and society are influenced by climate. He believed that hotter climates create hot-tempered people and colder climates aloof people, whereas the mild climate of France is an ideal balance. (Note: This theory may possibly have been influenced by similar sentiment expressed in Germania, an ethnographic writing by Tacitus, a writer frequently studied by Montesquieu.)

=== Voltaire ===
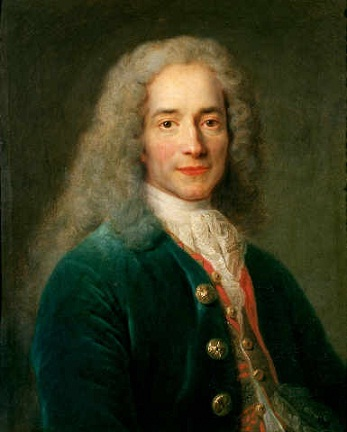
Voltaire

François-Marie Arouet, better known as Voltaire (1694–1778), was a prominent Enlightenment figure who advocated the right to a free trial and freedom of religion. Voltaire was a deist, and was twice sentenced to prison, and once to temporary exile to England.

A heavy influence on the Enlightenment was the work of British natural philosopher Sir Isaac Newton and the philosophy of Newtonianism, who published his Philosophiæ Naturalis Principia Mathematica (1686), which included his laws of motion, introducing classical mechanics in physics.

Voltaire and Émilie du Châtelet (1706–1749) wrote Elements of the Philosophy of Newton (1738), helping to popularize Newtonianism in France alongside Pierre Louis Maupertuis (1698–1759). Châtelet was the first woman published by the French Academy of Sciences. Voltaire's Letters on the English (1734) introduced French readers to the philosophy of the British empiricists like Newton and John Locke, as well as to playwright William Shakespeare.

Voltaire is best remembered for his aphorisms and satire of Leibniz known as Candide (1759), written soon after the 1755 Lisbon Earthquake, which tells the tale of a young believer in Leibnizian optimism who becomes disillusioned after a series of hardships.

Voltaire's anonymously published Philosophical Dictionary (1764) was censored in many countries, including Switzerland (Geneva) and France, where all available copies of the book were collected and burned in the town square.

=== Rousseau ===
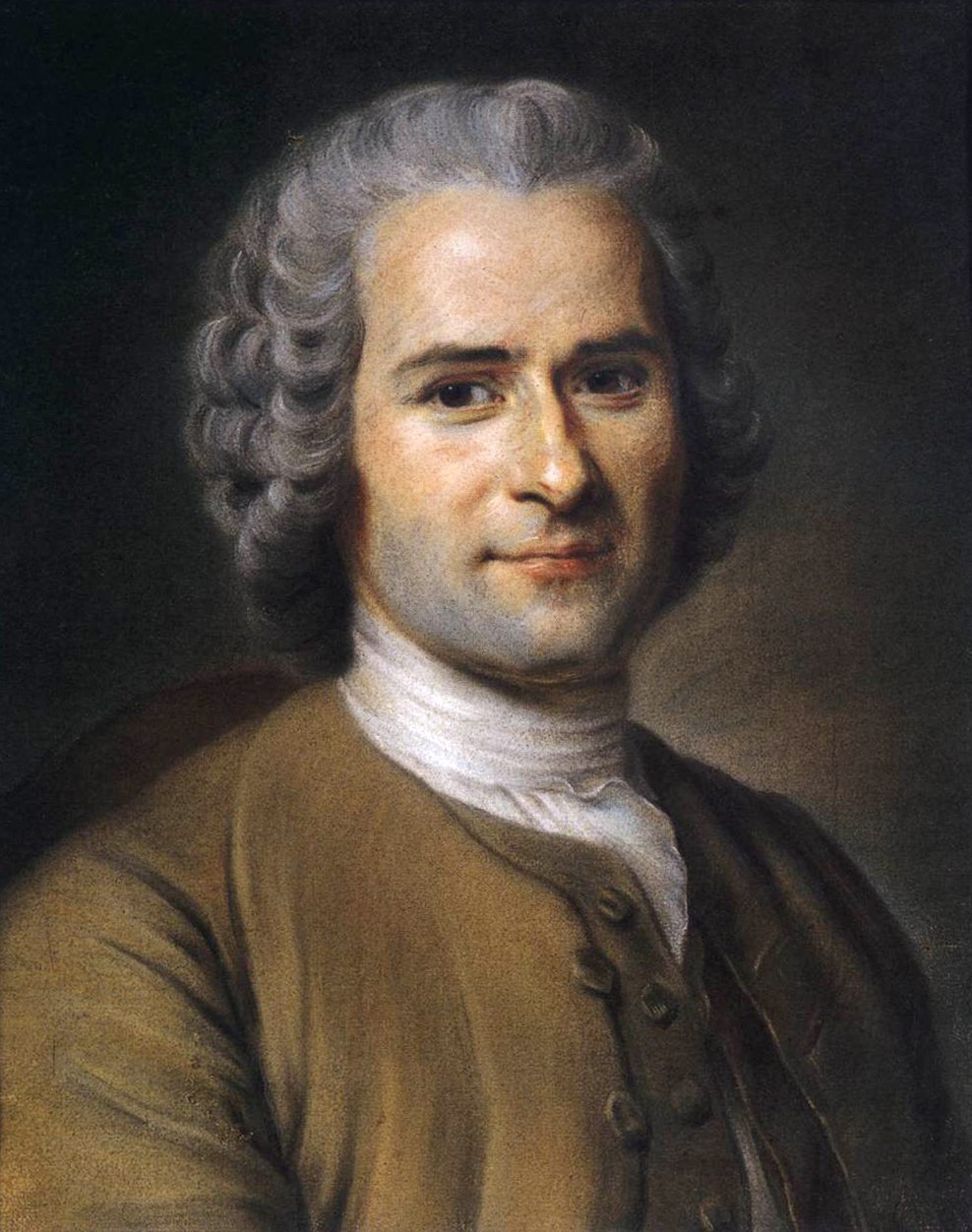
Jean Jacques Rousseau

Jean-Jacques Rousseau (1712–1778) distinguished himself from the progressive scientism of the Enlightenment with his proclamation in Discourse on the Arts and Sciences (1750) that art and science are corruptors of human morality. Furthermore, he caused controversy with his theory that man is good by nature but corrupted by society, in contradiction to the Christian doctrine of original sin.

Rousseau's The Social Contract (1762) advances social contract theory and affirms only the general will of the people has the right to legislate. It famously begins “Man is born free, and everywhere he is in chains.” Upon publication, its distribution in France was prohibited, and Rousseau fled the country to avoid imprisonment.

However it influenced the French Revolution. Rousseau was so highly praised by the revolutionaries that in 1794 his remains were moved to the Panthéon in Paris. Rousseau's Emile (1762), previously forbidden and publicly burned, became the basis of a new national system of education. His portrait graced the home of Kant, who called Rousseau "Newton of the moral world".

Some of his theories continue to be controversial, such as the general will, which has been accused of both fascism and communism. His critique of private property in works like Discourse on Inequality (1755) has been seen as a forebear to Marxist ideology. Both Étienne-Gabriel Morelly (1717–1778), who was mistaken for Rousseau, and Abbé de Mably (1709–1785), who was influenced by Rousseau, influenced socialism. Victor d'Hupay (1746–1818) coined the term communism.

Another Rousseau disciple was romanticist François-René de Chateaubriand (1768–1848), author of The Genius of Christianity (1802).

=== Diderot ===
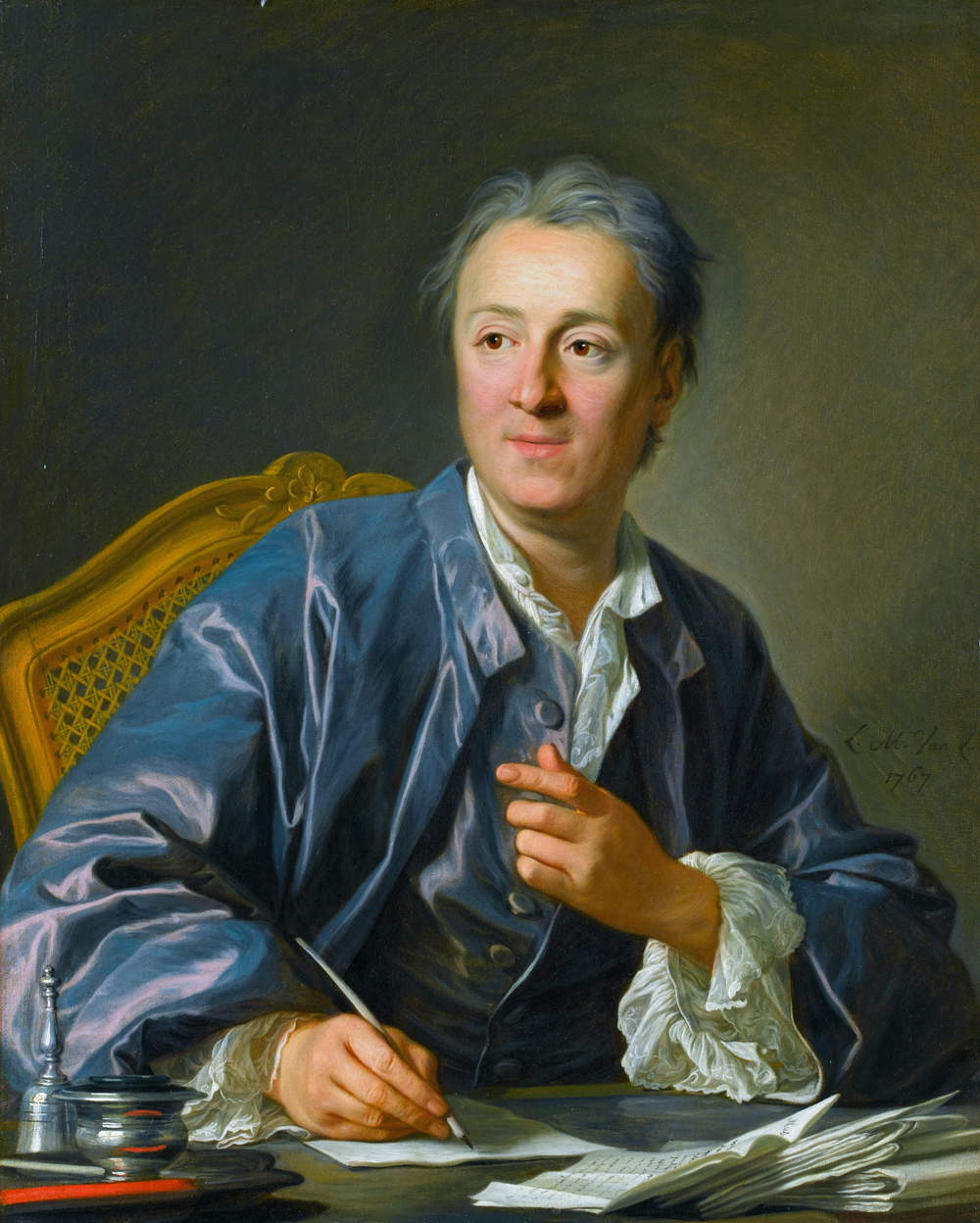
Encyclopédiste Denis Diderot

Denis Diderot (1713–1784) was a key collaborator of the Encyclopédistes who created the Encyclopédia, with mathematician Jean le Rond d’Alembert (1717–1783) and publisher André Le Breton (1708–1779).

A systematic collection of all the arts and sciences, the Encyclopédia caused great controversy. Diderot was harassed repeatedly by the police, and even arrested. The ecclesiastical party disliked the Encyclopédia, a threat to the aristocracy as it asserted the state should take care of the people. In the end, Le Breton began removing all articles he deemed controversial in fear of punishment.

Diderot was influenced by naturalists like the Comte de Buffon (1707–1788), and influenced Jean-Baptiste Robinet (1735–1820). Jean-Baptiste-Claude Delisle de Sales (1741–1816) wrote The Philosophy of Nature (1770).

D'Alembert taught Marquis de Condorcet (1743–1794) who supported free markets and equality, including for women. His wife Sophie de Condorcet ran a salon. Rousseau critic Benjamin Constant (1767–1830) attended. Constant was a liberal and collaborator with Madame de Staël (1766–1817), who introduced German idealism to France with On Germany (1813).

=== Sensationalism ===
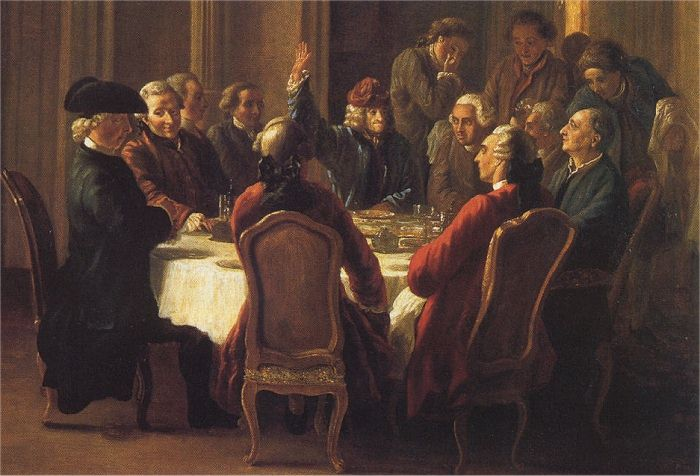
The Philosophers' Meal by Jean Huber (1772)

Influenced by Locke and Voltaire, Catholic priest Étienne Bonnot de Condillac (1714–1780) founded sensationalism, which emphasized an epistemology of sensation and perception. Idéologues at the National Institute were Condillac disciples, such as Antoine Destutt de Tracy, Volney, Pierre Laromiguière, physiologist Pierre Jean Georges Cabanis, French Basque Dominique Joseph Garat, and economists Pierre Louis Roederer and Jean-Baptiste Say. Condillac also influenced chemist Antoine Lavoisier (1743–1794).

The Institute sponsored a prize essay contest on language and "the influence of signs on the faculty of thought", won by Joseph Marie, baron de Gérando (1772–1842).

=== Materialism ===
Physician and materialist Julien Offray de La Mettrie (1709–1751) wrote Man a Machine (1747), affirming the Cartesian view of animals also applied to people, arguing against immortal souls. He had to flee France and settle in Berlin.

Claude Adrien Helvétius (1715–1771), whose wife Madame Helvétius ran a salon, was also a materialist, and argued against Montesquieu's climate theory. Helvétius published the sensationalist On Mind (1758), which said the only real motive is self-interest, therefore there is no good and evil, only competitive pleasures. Its non-religious, utilitarian and egalitarian doctrines raised a public outcry, and the Sorbonne publicly burned it in 1759, forcing Helvétius to issue several retractions.

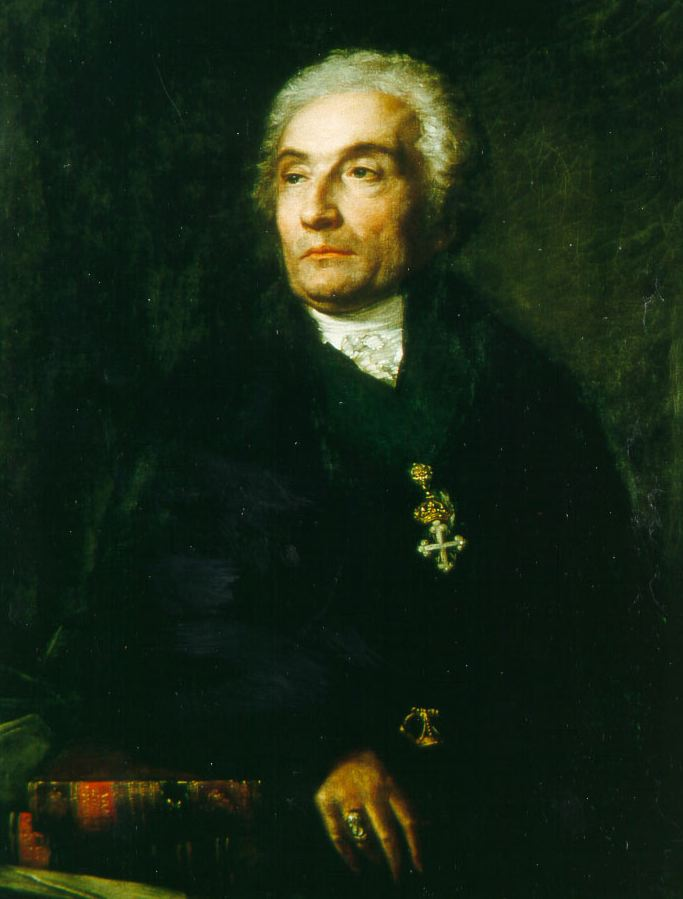
Joseph de Maistre

Baron d'Holbach (1723–1789) was a materialist who promoted atheism and ran a salon, which helped in the dissemination of "Protestant and especially German thought". He wrote The System of Nature (1770) and The Universal Morality (1776). Other atheists were utopian Sylvain Maréchal, astronomer Jérôme Lalande, and Jacques-André Naigeon.

=== Traditionalism ===
The sensationalists were opposed by Christian traditionalists like Louis de Bonald (1754–1840) who believed in revelation, and skeptic Félicité de La Mennais (1782–1854).

The deism and atheism was combated by Pascal-influenced Catholics like Jacques-Bénigne Bossuet and Nicolas-Sylvestre Bergier (1718–1790), who influenced Counter-Enlightenment and conservative monarchist Joseph de Maistre (1753–1821), who opposed the French Revolution and influenced Ultramontanism.

=== Revolution ===
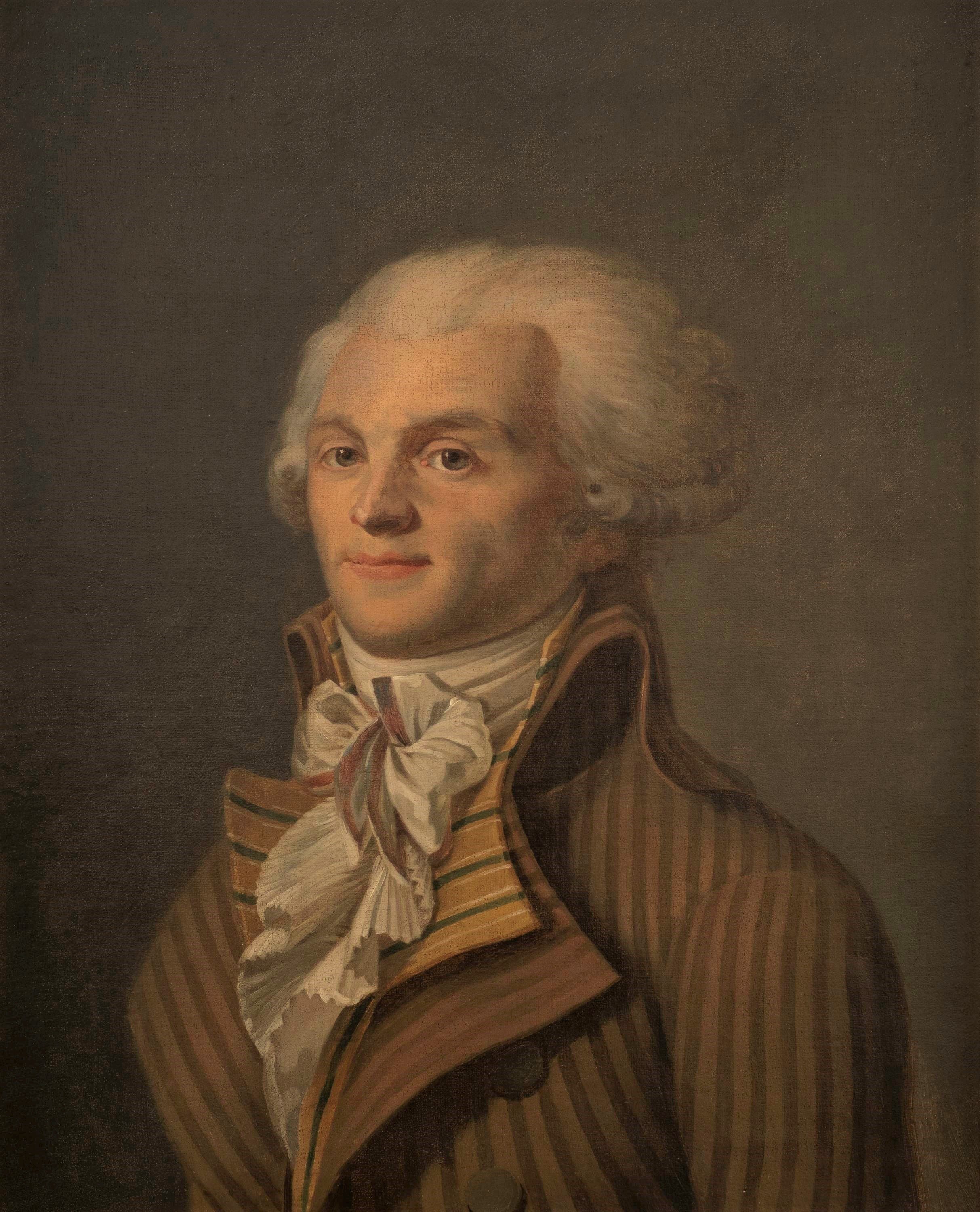
Maximilien Robespierre

The Storming of the Bastille (July 14, 1789) marked the start of the French Revolution, which adopted the Declaration of the Rights of Man and of the Citizen (1789) authored by Abbé Sieyès, who also wrote the pamphlet What Is the Third Estate? (1789). Maximilien Robespierre (1758–1794) and Jean-Paul Marat (1743–1793) were radical Jacobin leaders and Montagnard, sans-culottes supporters elected as deputies to the National Convention. Robespierre was appointed a member of the Committee of Public Safety and Marat of the Committee of General Security; both formed the provisional government during the Reign of Terror (c. 1793-1794).

Marat was assassinated in his bathtub by reactionary Charlotte Corday. She was soon executed by guillotine on the Place de Grève. Soon after, so were Queen Marie Antoinette and Olympe de Gouges (1748–1793), author of Declaration of the Rights of Woman and of the Female Citizen (1791).

Despite Catholic Red Priests like Jacques Roux (1752–1794), enragé and elected member of the Paris Commune, the French Revolution was opposed to the Church. During the Terror, Roux committed suicide before the Revolutionary Tribunal could try him. Condorcet died in prison after a period of hiding, during which he wrote Sketch for a Historical Picture of the Progress of the Human Mind (1795). French materialism and the Revolution influenced Marquis de Sade (1740–1814), namesake of sadism and writer of such works as Philosophy in the Boudoir (1795).

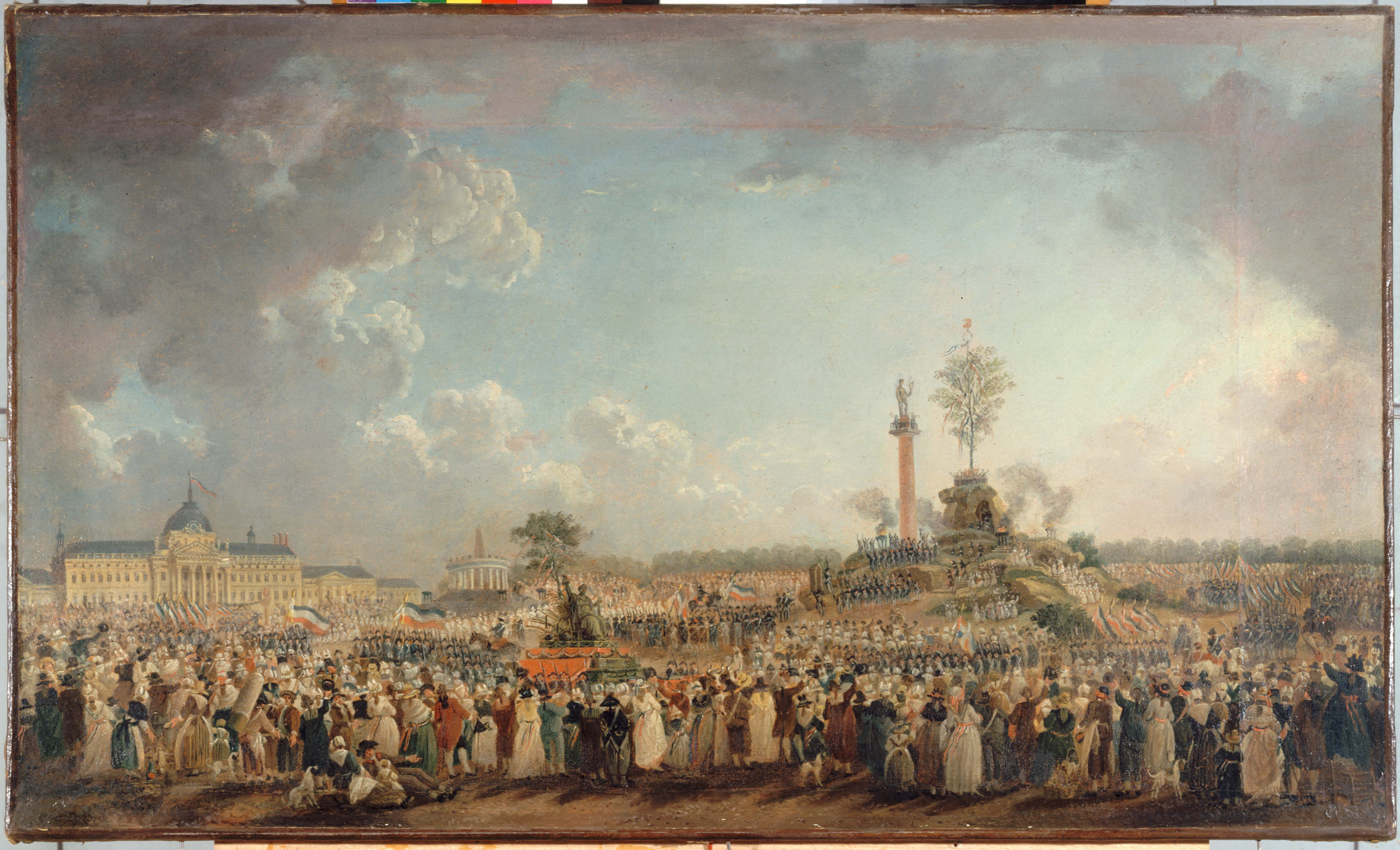
The Festival of the Supreme Being, by Pierre-Antoine Demachy (1794)

Revolutionaries like Antoine-François Momoro (1756–1794) supported atheism and the Cult of Reason; Robespierre supported deism and started the Cult of the Supreme Being. The National Convention decreed a rotating series of holidays like the Fête de la Fédération every décadi, the ten-day week in the new French Republican Calendar. Robespierre declared 20 Prairial Year II (8 June 1794, the Christian holiday of Pentecost) the first day of the Festival of the Supreme Being.

The Convention turned against Robespierre, who was arrested without trial and executed by guillotine on the Place de la Révolution, followed by the Thermidorian Reaction and the First White Terror.

The Conspiracy of the Equals which published The Manifesto of the Equals (1796) was led by François-Noël Babeuf (1760–1797), who was influenced by Abbé de Mably.

== 19th century ==
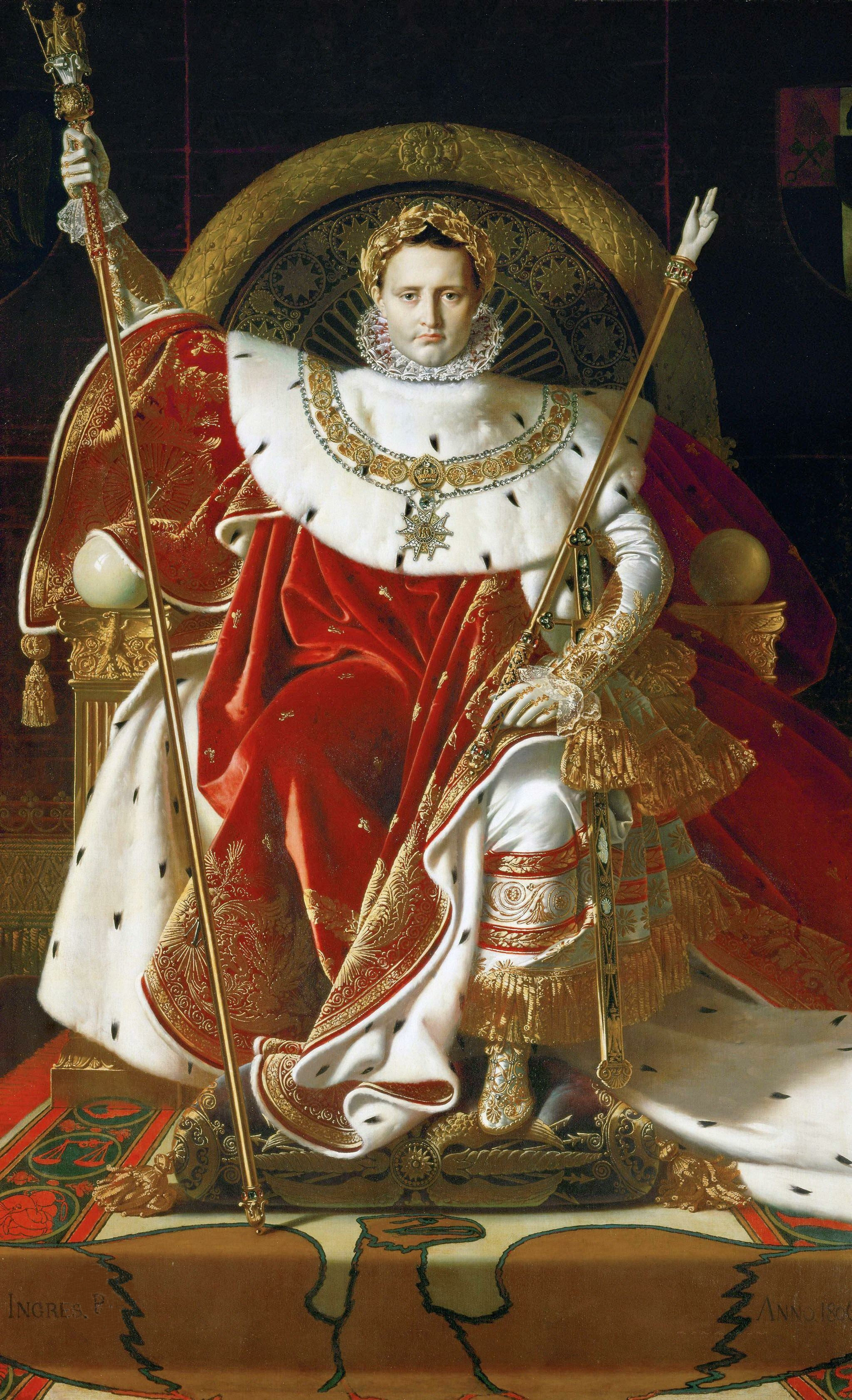
Napoleon on his Imperial throne, by Jean-Auguste-Dominique Ingres

The turn of the 19th century also saw the Haitian Revolution led by Toussaint Louverture (1743–1803) and influenced by the French Revolution.

Napoleon ended the Revolution with the Coup of 18 Brumaire (9 November 1799), establishing himself as head of the Consulate and eventually Emperor of the French.

The 19th century saw the Napoleonic Wars, the Bourbon Restoration (1814–1830), then the July Revolution of 1830 followed by the July Monarchy (1830–1848) and the Revolution of 1848. Alexis de Tocqueville (1805–1859) analyzed the causes of the French Revolution in The Old Regime and the Revolution (1856).

France also experienced the loss of the Franco-Prussian War (1870) and the subsequent revolutionary and violently suppressed Paris Commune.

The Academy of Moral and Political Sciences was restarted in 1832, through an appeal by François Guizot (1787–1874) to King Louis Philippe.

=== Saint-Simonianism ===
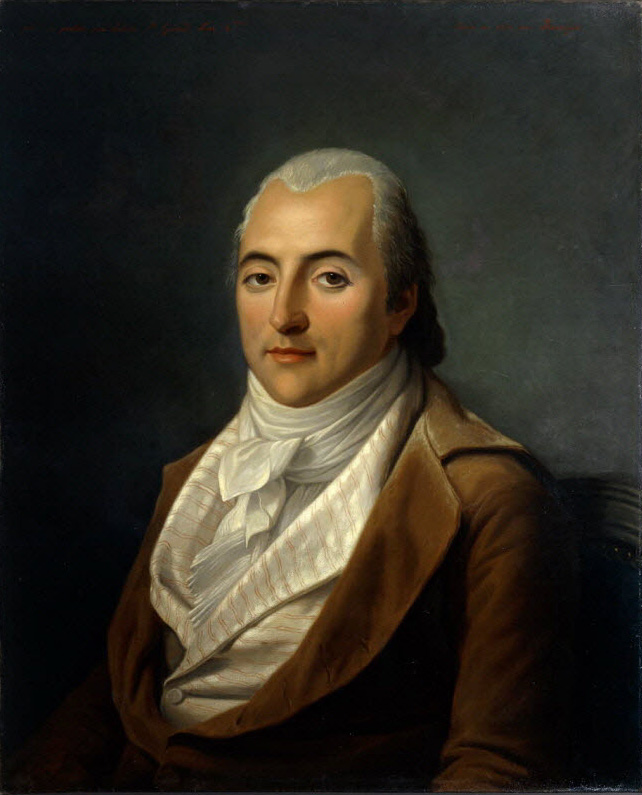
Henri de Saint-Simon

French revolutionary Henri de Saint-Simon (1760–1825) birthed Saint-Simonianism, affirming science's ability to transform society in such works as Introduction to scientific discoveries of the 19th century (1803) and eulogy to Napoleon Notes on the study of man (1813). Saint-Simon was also a Christian who wrote The New Christianity (1825).

Saint-Simonian Pierre Leroux (1797–1871) and Paul-François Dubois (1793–1874) established Le Globe in 1824, the movement's main publication during the July Monarchy (1830–1848). French historian Augustin Thierry (1795–1856) followed Saint-Simon.

Saint-Simon's intellectual rival was physicist Pierre-Simon Laplace (1749–1827). Known as the "French Newton", he argued for determinism with Laplace's demon. Influenced by Laplace, André-Marie Ampère (1775–1836) was a founder of classical electromagnetism. Influenced by Condorcet, Antoine Augustin Cournot (1801–1877) tried to unite the concepts of cause and chance.

=== Eclecticism ===
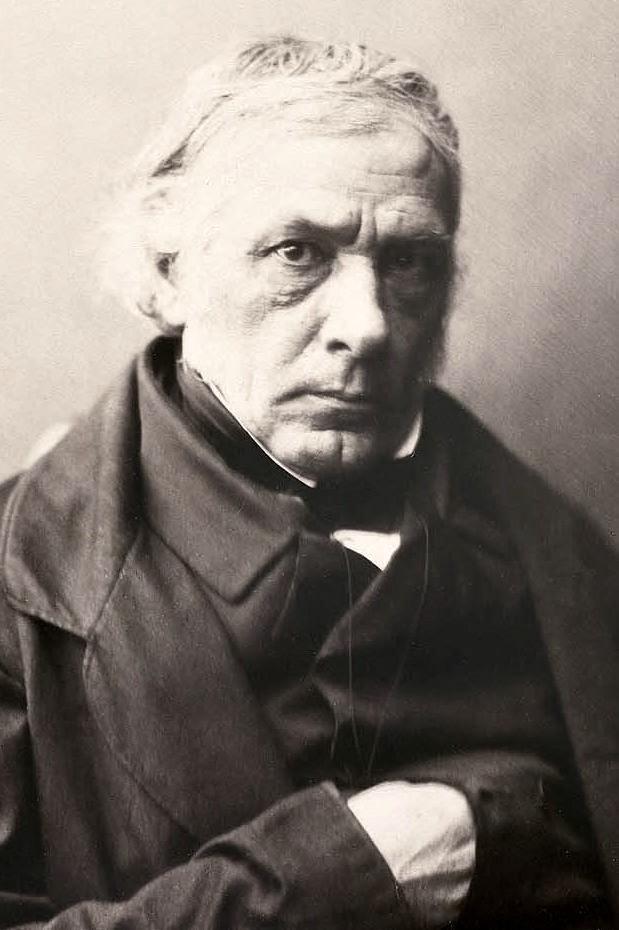
Victor Cousin founded eclecticism.

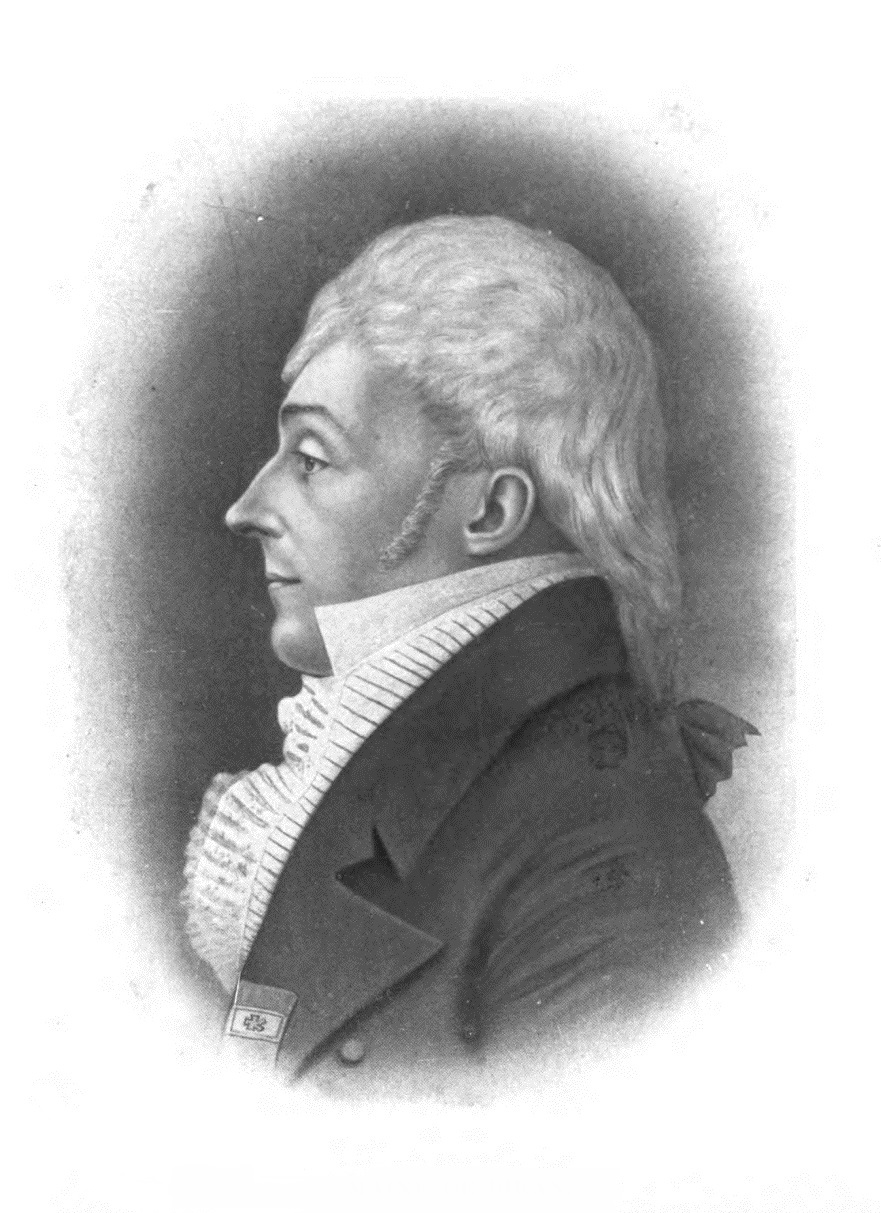
Maine de Biran influenced spiritualism.

Pierre Paul Royer-Collard (1763–1845) was leader of the Doctrinaires during the Bourbon Restoration. He brought Scottish common sense realism to France, shown in his pupil Victor Cousin (1792–1867), the founder of eclecticism. Cousin also learned under Pierre Laromiguière (1756–1837) at École Normale Supérieure, and was influenced by German idealism as well.

Cousin student was Théodore Jouffroy (1796–1842) was also influenced by Scottish philosophy. Along with Leroux and Dubois, Jouffroy and Jean-Philibert Damiron (1794–1862) helped establish Le Globe. Adolphe Garnier (1801–1864) continued Jouffroy's work. Garnier's Treatise on the Faculties of the Soul (1852) won the Montyon Prize.

Statesman Jules Simon (1814–1896) was also influenced by Cousin, as was Charles de Rémusat (1797–1875). Étienne Vacherot (1809–1897) succeeded Cousin at the Sorbonne.

=== Spiritualism ===
French spiritualism was influenced by Maine de Biran (1766–1824), at first a follower of Condillac, but who became a mystical theosophist influenced by Malebranche and Pascal. Maine de Biran's diary covers the melancholy and tension of the Hundred Days, Napoleon's exile and return culminating in his final defeat at the Battle of Waterloo (1815), and permanent exile. An idiosyncratic French philosopher likely influenced by Maine de Biran was Jules Lequier (1814–1862).

Félix Ravaisson-Mollien (1813–1900) and Jules Lachelier (1832–1918) were also influenced by German idealism, but distinguished their views from Cousin's, preferring spiritualism. Lachelier taught Jules Lagneau (1851–1894), who taught the "reflexive method", and was a franc-tireur in the Franco-Prussian War.

Alfred Jules Émile Fouillée (1838–1912) was a spiritualist who believed in "idea-forces". Fouillée was the step-father of Jean-Marie Guyau (1854–1888).

=== Socialism and anarchism ===
==== Fourier ====
Eugène Delacroix, Liberty Leading the People, 1830. Louvre Museum

Saint-Simon influenced the utopian socialism of Charles Fourier (1772–1837) and Fourierism. Fourier influenced Christian and utopian socialist Étienne Cabet (1788–1856), who was a more radical revolutionary than Fourier. Cabet saw Christianity as synonymous with socialism.

==== Blanc ====
Christian and socialist Louis Blanc (1811–1882), a historian of the 1830 Revolution who opposed the July Monarchy, was a member of the provisional government during the 1848 Revolution. Blanc was exiled but returned to France in time for the defeat in the Franco-Prussian War. He did not support the revolutionary Paris Commune, but successfully proposed amnesty for the Communards.

After the suppression of the 1848 Revolution, radicalism and republicanism declined. Blanc, Romantic author Victor Hugo (1802–1885), and historian Edgar Quinet (1803–1875) attended the first meeting of the League of Peace and Freedom. One-time president of the League Émile Arnaud coined the term pacifism.

==== Blanqui ====
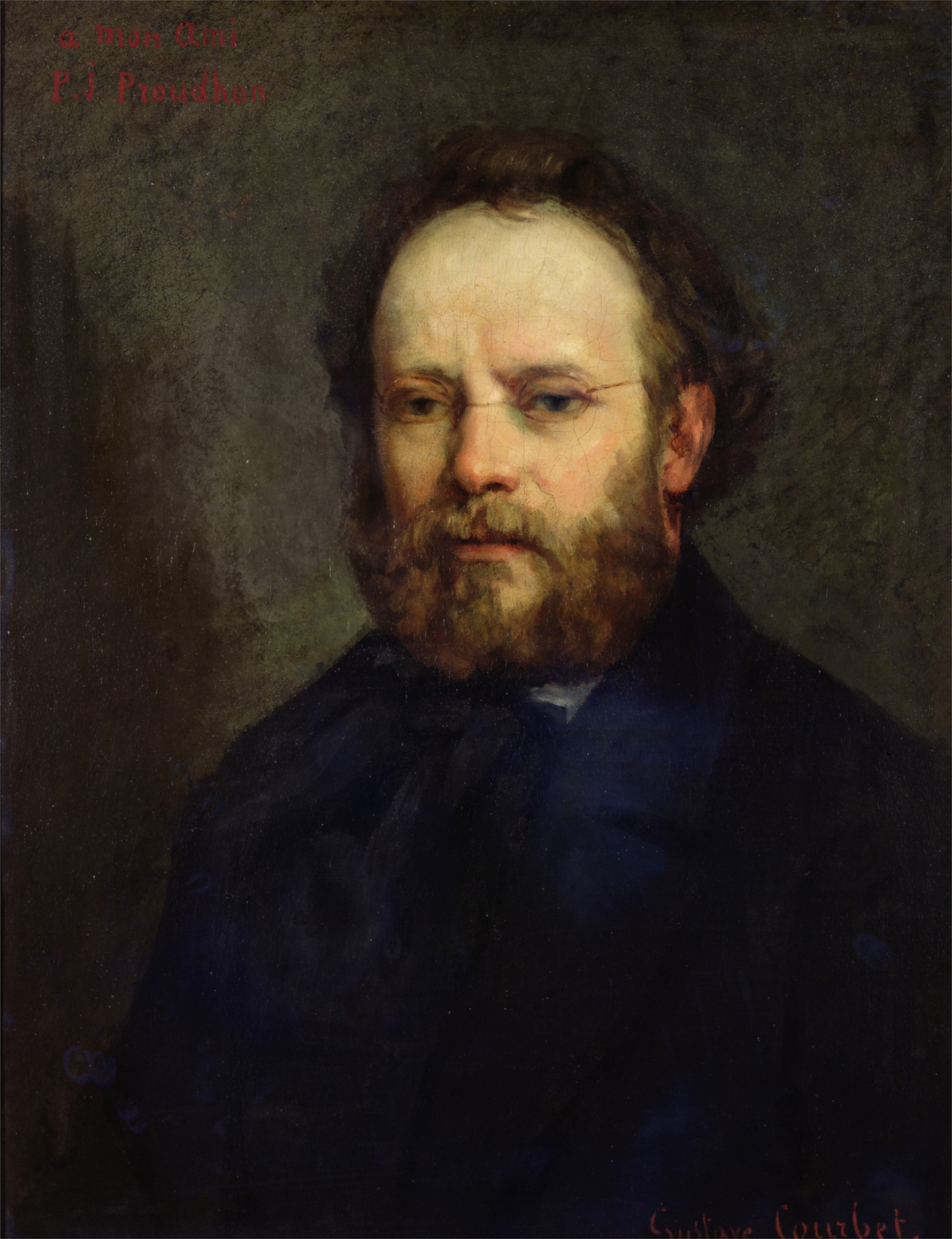
Anarchist Pierre Joseph Proudhon

Saint-Simon and the book by Philippe Buonarroti (1761–1837) History of Babeuf’s Conspiracy of Equals (1828) influenced socialist philosopher Louis-Auguste Blanqui (1805–1881), the founder of Blanquism. Blanquism believes socialist revolution should involve a coup d'etat by a relatively small group of highly organised and secretive conspirators. Blanqui participated in the 1830 Revolution, and was a leading voice in the radical clubs of the 1848 Revolution. Blanqui spent 33 years of his life in prison, earning him the nickname "The Prisoner".

==== Proudhon ====
Fourier was an influence on anarchist Pierre Joseph Proudhon (1809–1865). Proudhonism supports mutualism, a kind of market socialism. Proudhon published The Philosophy of Poverty (1846), prompting a book-length critique from Karl Marx entitled The Poverty of Philosophy (1847), starting a rift which resulted in the split between anarchism and Marxism at the First International (1864). It continued with the followers of Russian collectivist anarchist Mikhail Bakunin and lasts to this day.

=== Positivism ===
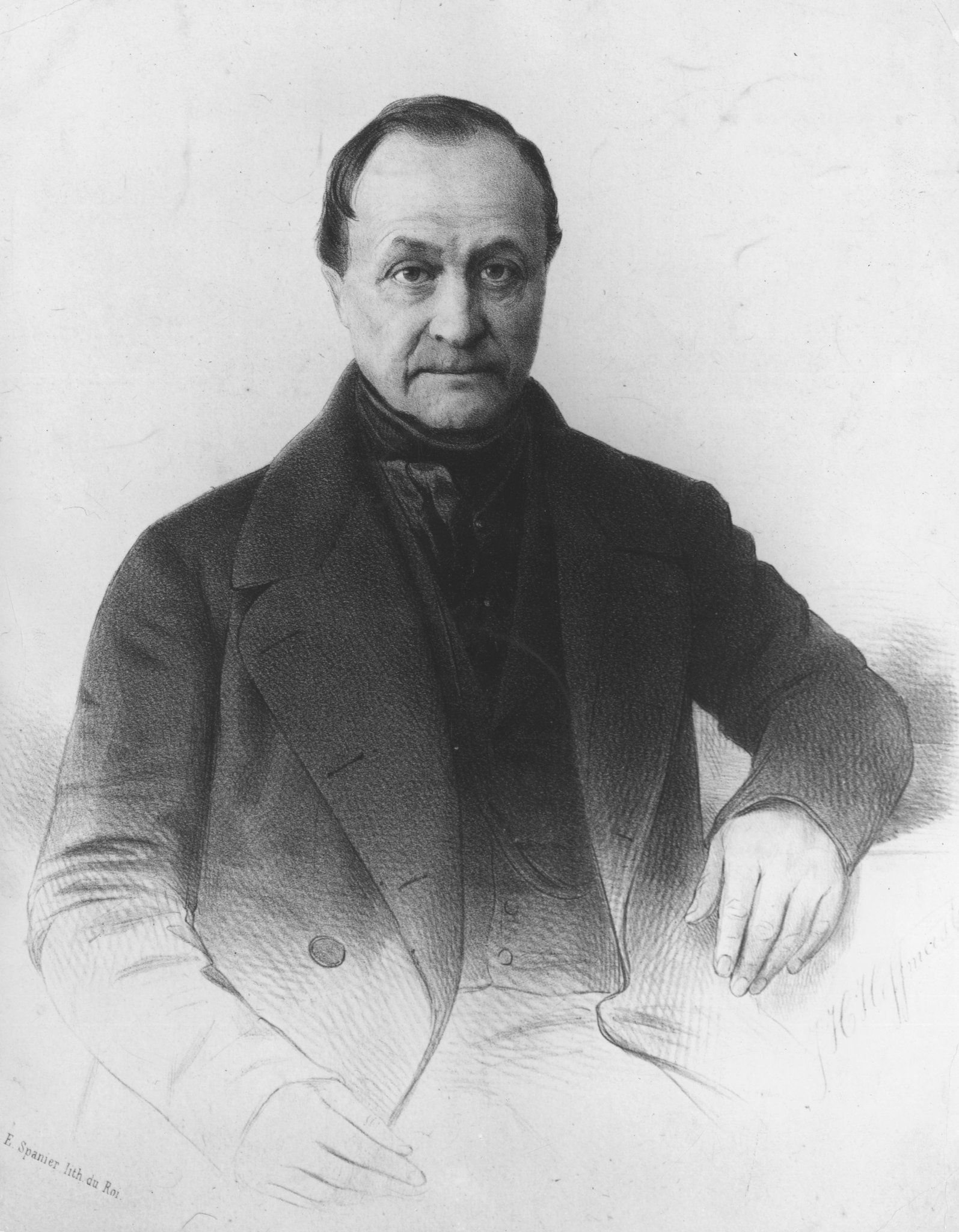
Auguste Comte was the founder of sociology and positivism.

Auguste Comte (1798–1857) was the founder of sociology, the philosophy of positivism, and may be regarded as the first modern philosopher of science. Comte also had considerable influence outside of France, impacting the work of Karl Marx and John Stuart Mill.

Influenced by Fourier and Saint-Simon, Comte developed positivism to remedy the aftermath of the French Revolution, calling for a new social project based on the sciences. Comte proposed a theory of social evolution, with society undergoing three phases in its quest for the truth according to a general 'law of three stages': (1) the theological, (2) the metaphysical, and (3) the positive.

While originally a follower of Saint-Simon, Comte was not a Christian. He attempted to introduce a "religion of humanity" which, though largely unsuccessful, was influential for various Secular Humanist organizations in the 19th century. Comte coined the term "altruism".

Comte's student Charles Renouvier (1815–1903) was influenced by Lequier, and was a German idealist and personalist who founded neocriticism. Sociologist Émile Durkheim (1858–1917) read Comte and Renouvier. Durkheim was a structural functionalist who wrote Suicide (1897). Durkheim was friends with Octave Hamelin (1856–1907).

Cousin and Comte influenced Hippolyte Taine (1828–1893), the founder of French literary naturalism, and a proponent of sociological positivism and historicism. Deeply shaken by the 1870 defeat and Paris Commune, Taine became devoted to his major historical work, The Origins of Contemporary France (1875–1893).

Vacherot influenced Taine's fatalism, which was challenged by orientalist Ernest Renan (1823–1892). Renan influenced modernist Alfred Loisy (1857–1940).

== 20th century ==
20th-century French philosophy saw the rise of many continental schools of thought, including philosophy of science and phenomenology. Existentialism had a wide influence, only to die out somewhat with the advent of structuralism, which came to be seen as merely a necessary means to post-structuralism and postmodern thought which came to dominate the late 20th century.

20th-century France saw the end of the Belle Époque up until World War I (1914–1918). Aesthetician André Malraux (1901–1976) and philosopher of science Jean Cavaillès (1903–1944) were part of the French Resistance in World War II (1939–1945). Afterwards came the Trente Glorieuses. But France also saw widespread strikes and civil unrest in May 68, inspired by countercultural, anti-imperialist, Marxist, and anarchist ideologies.

=== Bergsonism ===
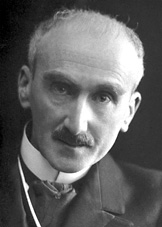
Henri Bergson shaped 20th century thought.

Henri Bergson (1859–1941) was popular during his lifetime, appealing to both academics and the general public, leading to the "Bergson boom". Bergson was awarded the 1927 Nobel Prize for Literature. However, interest in his work decreased after World War II.

Writers outside of French philosophy influenced by Bergsonism include the novelist Marcel Proust, poet T. S. Eliot, American philosopher William James, and British philosopher Alfred North Whitehead.

Bergson was influenced by Kant, Lachelier, Herbert Spencer's evolutionary philosophy, and mathematician Bernhard Riemann. Bergson coined the term élan vital, establishing vitalism in works like Creation Evolution (1907), and was the French representative of Lebensphilosophie. Bergson's work focused on consciousness, which Bergson thought was always experienced as a multiplicity.

He also thought the experience of time was intrinsic to consciousness, calling it "the duration". Bergson regards the duration as a qualitative multiplicity, rather than quantitative; there is heterogeneity but no separation, juxtaposition or mechanistic causality. The duration can only be grasped through intuition. Bergson notably debated Einstein.

=== Sorelianism ===
Georges Sorel (1847–1922) who founded Sorelianism was a revolutionary syndicalist influenced by Bergson, Proudhon, and his friend anarchist Fernand Pelloutier (1867–1901). Sorel advocated violence and the power of myth, writing Reflections on Violence (1908).

=== Neo-Thomism ===
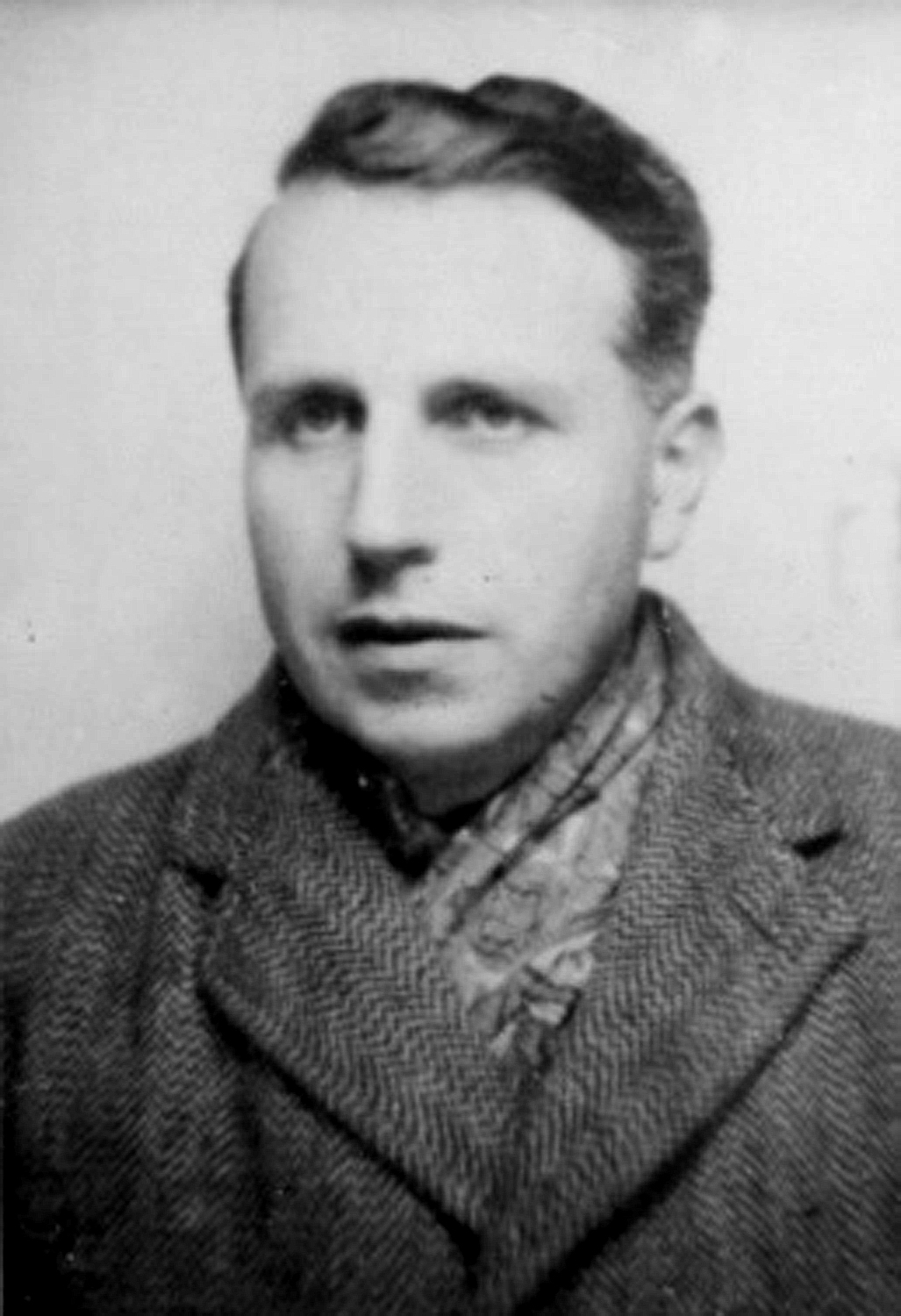
Georges Bataille was a surrealist.

Catholic Léon Bloy (1846–1917) influenced neo-Thomism in France, through philosophers such as Bergson student Jacques Maritain (1882–1973), a mentor to Pope Paul VI, who presented to Maritain his "Message to Men of Thought and of Science" at the close of Vatican II.

The Neo-Thomists were opposed by World War I casualty and Bergsonian Catholic Charles Péguy (1873–1914), who influenced non-conformist personalists Emmanuel Mounier (1905–1950) and Alexandre Marc (1904–2000). The Neo-Thomists also opposed orientalist esotericist René Guénon (1886–1951).

=== Surrealism ===
Surrealism, led by Surrealist Manifesto author André Breton, developed in the aftermath of World War I. Durkheim influenced Georges Bataille (1897–1962), author of Story of the Eye (1928).

=== Philosophy of mind ===
Spiritualists like psychologist René Le Senne (1882–1954) and Louis Lavelle (1883–1951) advanced philosophy of mind. Lavelle's magnum opus was The Dialectic of the Eternal Present (1922).

=== Philosophy of science ===
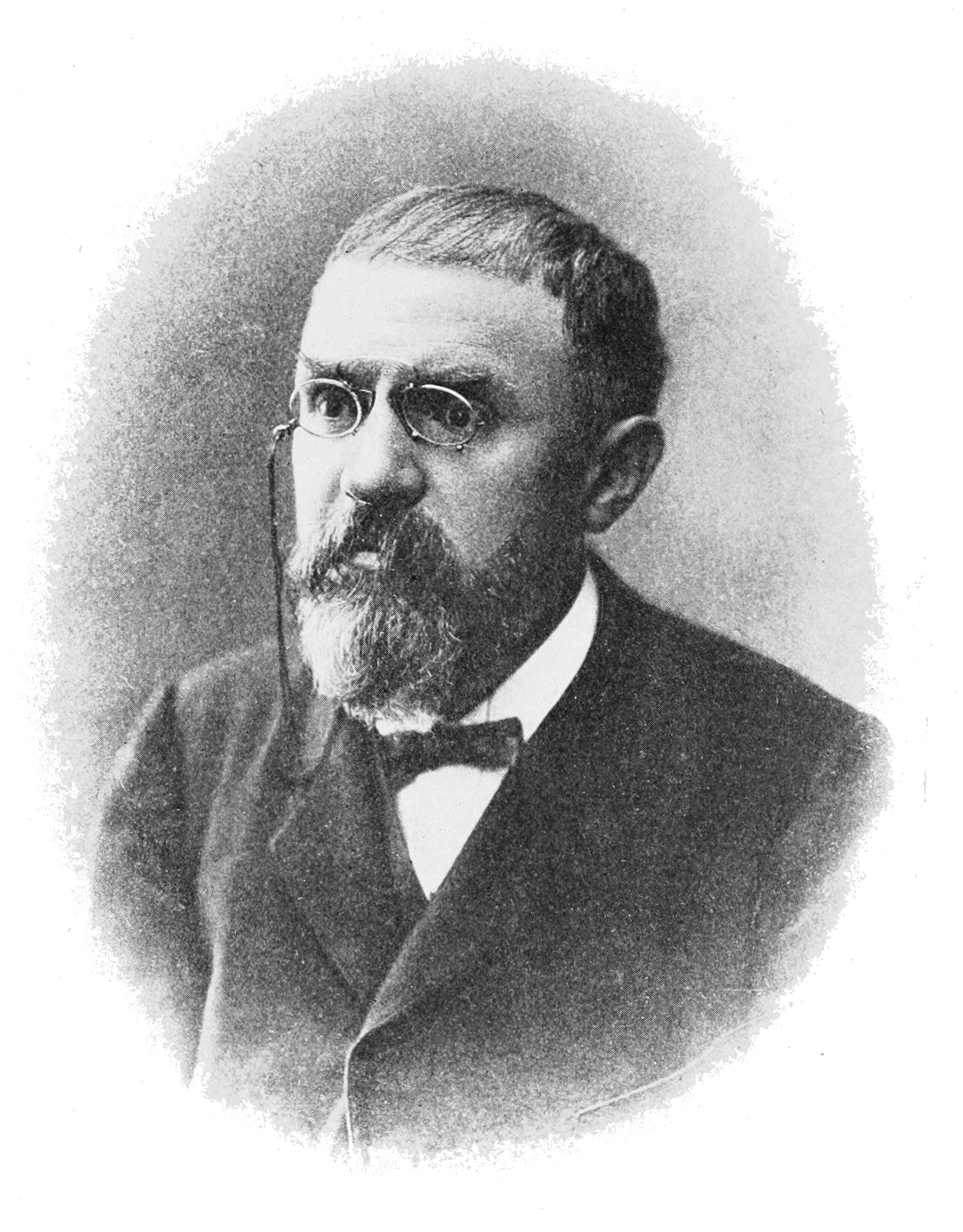
Henri Poincaré

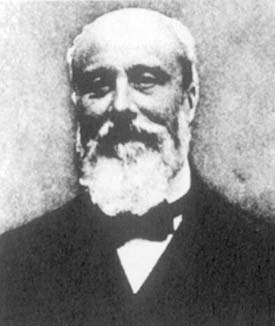
Pierre Duhem

In France, philosophy of science, also known as French historical epistemology or French epistemology, was a prominent school of thought which included Henri Poincaré, Pierre Duhem, Émile Boutroux, Léon Brunschvicg, Jean Cavaillès, Gaston Bachelard, Georges Canguilhem, Jules Vuillemin, Arthur Hannequin, Émile Meyerson, Paul Tannery, Gaston Milhaud, Alexandre Koyré, Jean-Toussaint Desanti, Gilbert Simondon, Michel Serres, and Jean-Michel Berthelot.

==== Poincaré ====
Henri Poincaré (1854–1912) had views on the philosophy of mathematics opposite to those of logicists like Louis Couturat (1868–1914), who believed that mathematics was a branch of logic. Poincaré strongly disagreed, claiming intuition was the life of mathematics, known as pre-intuitionism or conventionalism. He held the same view for science, found in the book Science and Hypothesis (1902). Édouard Le Roy (1870–1954) held views similar to Poincaré.

==== Duhem ====
Thermodynamicist Pierre Duhem (1861–1916) introduced the Duhem thesis in works such as The Aim and Structure of Physical Theory (1906), a form of confirmation holism, which says a single scientific hypothesis can never be falsified by itself, coming with a combination of other theories. (Note: American analytic philosopher W. V. O. Quine independently came to similar views to Duhem in "Two Dogmas of Empiricism", and so the idea has come to be called the "Duhem–Quine thesis.")

Duhem also sought to revise the history of science from its anti-Catholicism and founded the history of medieval science with the ten volume The System of the World, beginning in 1913.

==== Boutroux ====
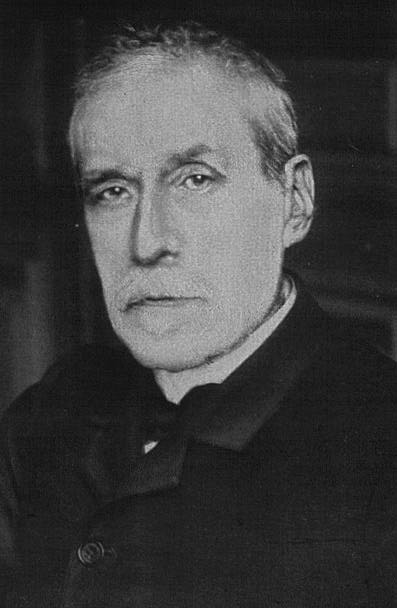
Émile Boutroux opposed scientific materialism.

Lachelier also taught Poincaré's brother-in-law Émile Boutroux (1845–1921), a critic of materialism in science. Boutroux taught philosopher of action Maurice Blondel (1861–1949), first cousin of physicist André Blondel.

==== Brunschvicg ====
Boutroux also influenced Léon Brunschvicg (1869–1944), who in 1893 co-founded the Revue de métaphysique et de morale with Xavier Léon (1868–1935) and Élie Halévy (1870–1937). Brunschvicg was the husband of feminist Cécile Kahn (1877–1946).

==== Others ====
Cavaillès studied science, mathematical logic, and set theory. Gaston Bachelard (1884–1962) introduced the concepts of epistemological obstacle and epistemological break. Georges Canguilhem (1904–1995) reintroduced vitalism into the philosophy of biology. Jules Vuillemin (1920–2001) focused on epistemology and introduced the "philosophy of algebra". (Note: Vuillemin also introduced analytic philosophy to France. While more associated with analytic philosophy, Scottish logician Hugh MacColl lived in France.)

More recently, Marc Augé (1935–2023) was an anthropologist who in the book Non-Places (1995) explored the concept of "non-places", transient spaces where people remain anonymous, such as airports, gas stations, and shopping malls.

=== Simone Weil and Alain ===
Simone Weil (1909–1943) was an Alsatian Jewish mystic philosopher and political activist who wrote the posthumously published The Need for Roots (1949). Weil influenced Pope Paul VI and René Girard (1923–2015). Her ideas include uprootedness, decreation (renouncing the gift of free will), obligations as the basis of rights, the unjust character of misfortune, and compassion, which Weil believed involved attention, was patriotic, and must act in the area of metaxy.

Émile-Auguste Chartier, known as Alain (1868–1951), was taught by Lagneau, and himself taught Weil, Canguilhem, and existentialist Mikel Dufrenne (1910–1995). Alain supported the Radical Party.

=== Phenomenology ===
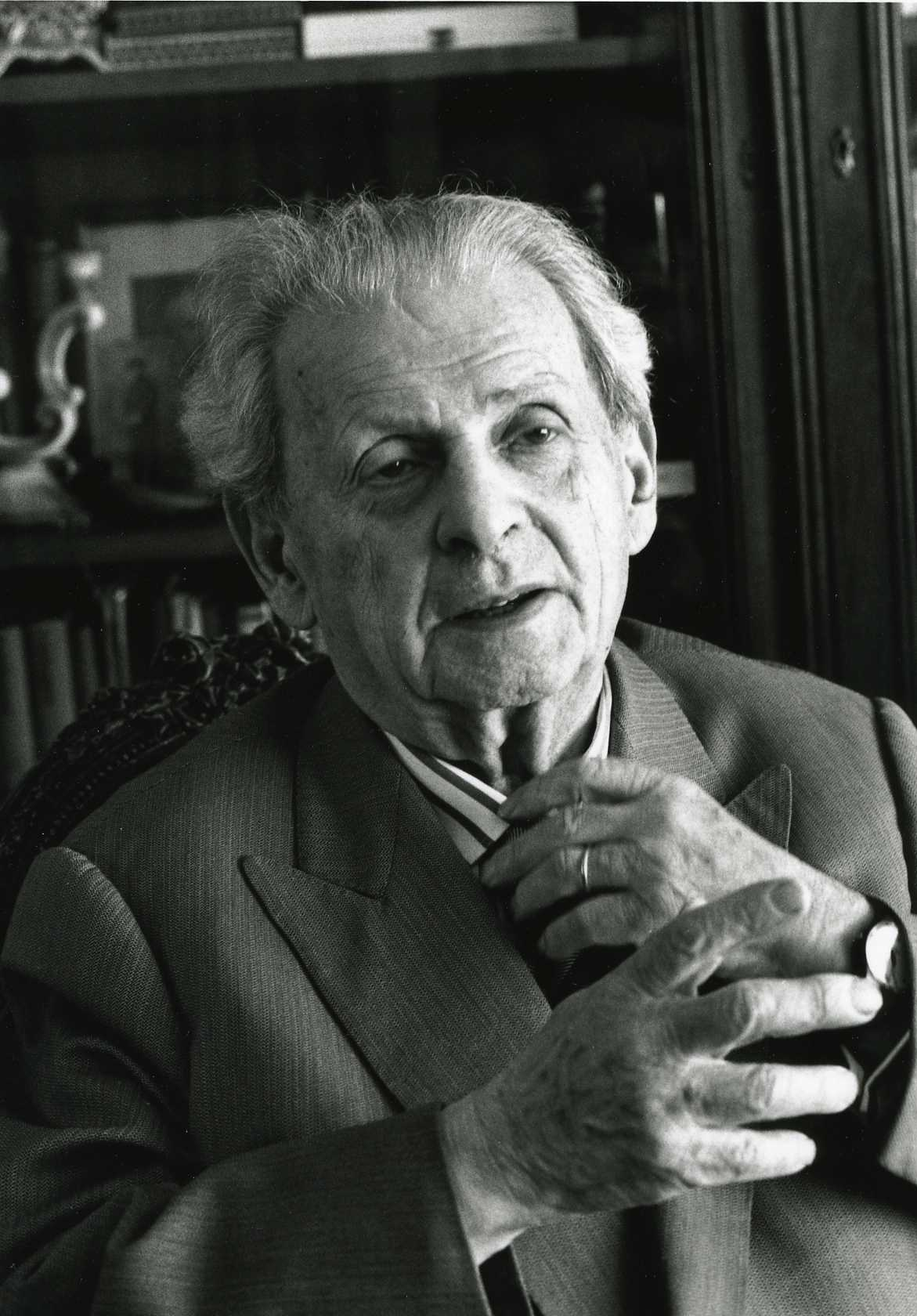
Emmanuel Lévinas

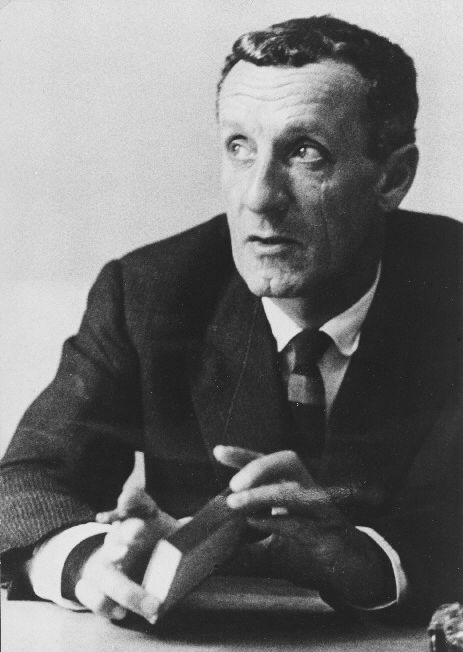
Maurice Merleau-Ponty

Phenomenology is philosophy which emphasizes phenomena as it is given to consciousness, attempting to avoid imposed explanations, influenced by German thinkers Edmund Husserl and Martin Heidegger. In France, phenomenology was also influenced by Bergson, and is still an important area of research in France today. One of the first to introduce phenomenology to France was Jean Héring (1890–1966).

==== Lévinas ====
Emmanuel Lévinas (1906–1995) propounded phenomenology and translated Husserl’s Cartesian Meditations (1931). Lévinas re-introduced ethics into phenomenology, absent since the demise of German Max Scheler; and further proclaimed ethics should be the first subject of philosophy. He is notable for such notions as the other and the face.

==== Merleau-Ponty ====
Maurice Merleau-Ponty (1908–1961) was concerned with the foundations of perception and influenced by Gestalt psychology. His theory was produced in opposition to Cartesian doctrines like a "pre-reflective subject" in the Cogito and substance dualism. In contrast to the clear distinction between the mind and the external world, for Merleau-Ponty the mind and body are bound together as 'embodied subjectivity'. Merleau-Ponty explains the habitual use of tools as "dilation" of "being-in-the-world".

==== Ricœur ====
Paul Ricœur (1913–2005) was best known for combining phenomenology with hermeneutics. He was awarded the 2000 Kyoto Prize for having "revolutionized the methods of hermeneutic phenomenology." Ricoeur was imprisoned in prisoner-of-war camp Oflag II-D with Mikel Dufrenne, who later wrote The Phenomenology of Aesthetic Experience (1953).

=== Existentialism and Absurdism ===
Existentialism was a prominent school of thought in the first half of the 20th century, influenced by philosophers such as the Danish Søren Kierkegaard and German Friedrich Nietzsche. Existentialism is concerned with the human condition, exploring such topics as purpose and freedom.

==== Sartre ====
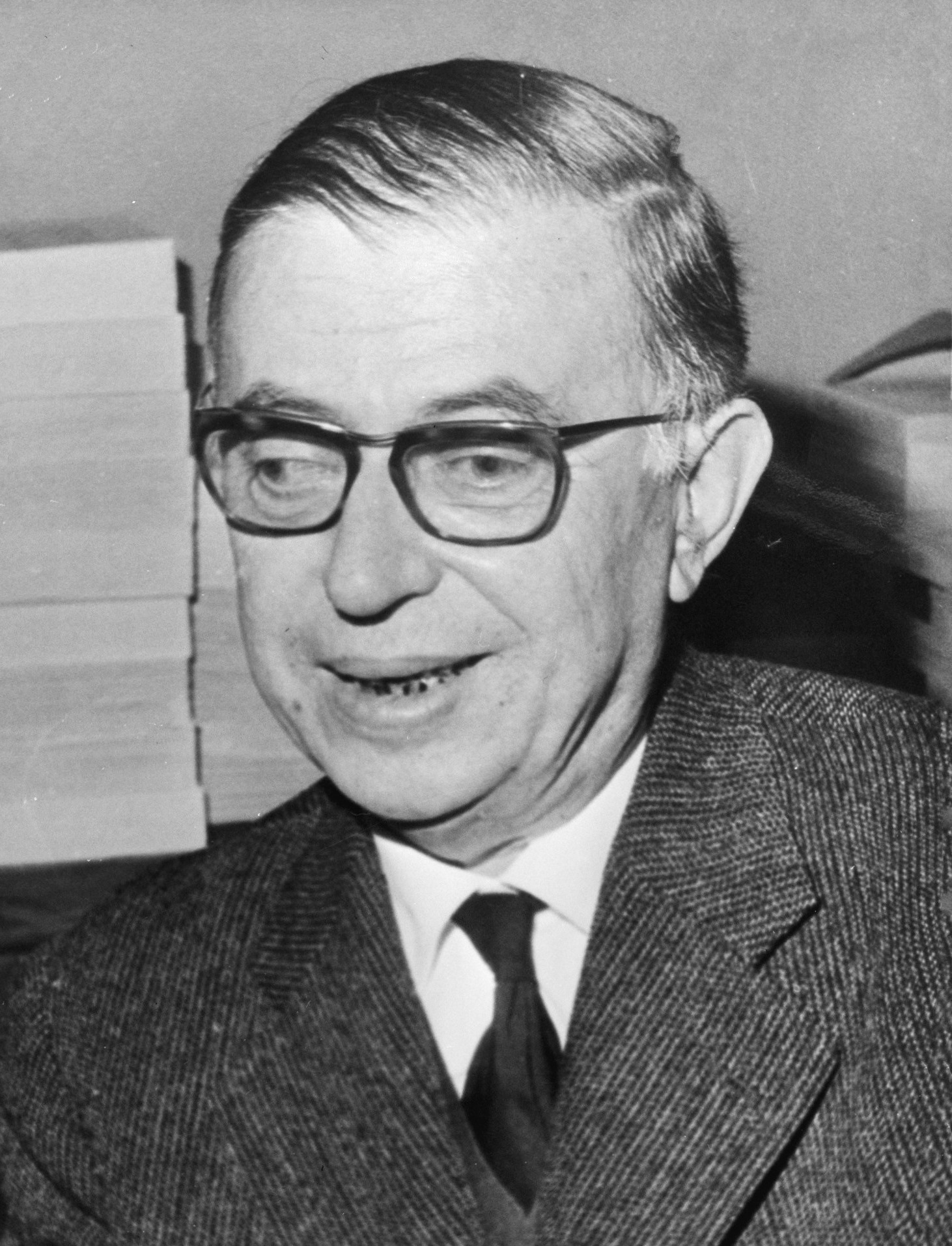
Jean-Paul Sartre

The most notable French existentialist was Jean-Paul Sartre (1905–1980), also a phenomenologist and libertarian Marxist who thought his conclusions followed from atheism. He was a spokesman for a generation, but his influence waned with the advent of structuralism.

Sartre's main thesis is existence precedes essence, first stated in Existentialism Is a Humanism (1946). An artisan devises an essence for an object, such as a knife, for the purpose of slicing bread. However, without God, man has no essence; he is born free, thrown into the world solely responsible for his actions which create his essence. The denial of this responsibility through excuses is what Sartre termed bad faith.

Sartre responded to Heidegger's Being and Time with Being and Nothingness (1943). He also wrote the novel Nausea (1938) about alienation. His play No Exit (1944) is the source of the quote "Hell is other people."

Gabriel Marcel (1889–1973), a Christian who wrote The Mystery of Being (1951) tried to distance himself from similarities to Sartre, preferring "philosophy of existence" to existentialism.

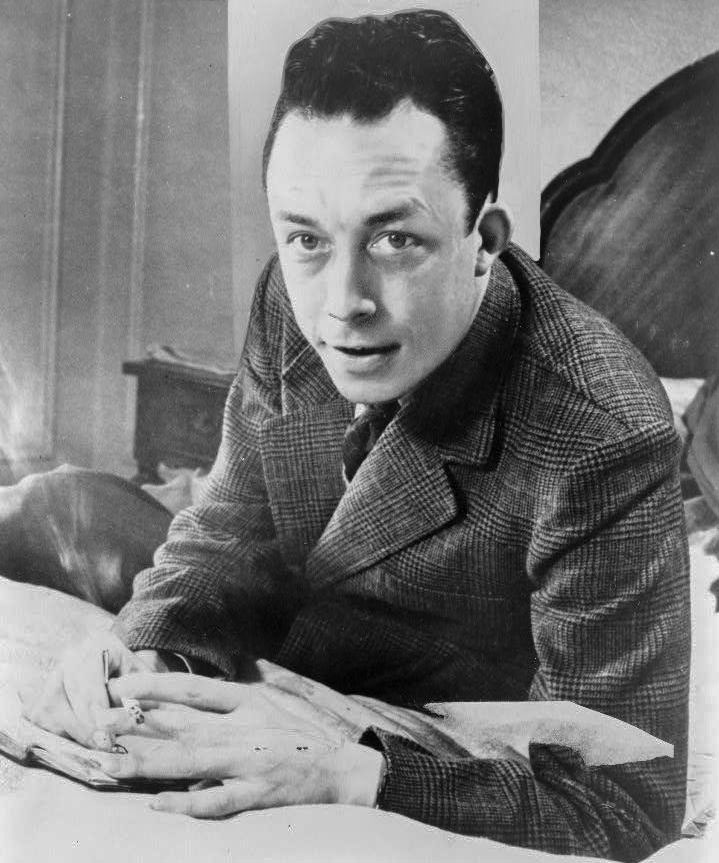
Albert Camus propounded absurdism.

French philosophy also influenced the Caribbean. Trinidadian Marxist C. L. R. James (1901–1989) wrote The Black Jacobins (1938) about the Haitian Revolution. Sartre, James, and négritude poet Aimé Cesaire influenced Martinican Pan-Africanist Frantz Fanon (1925–1961), supporter of the Algerian War and author of Black Skin, White Masks (1952). The Frantz Fanon prize is awarded by the Caribbean Philosophical Association.

==== Camus ====
Albert Camus (1913–1960), winner of the 1957 Nobel Prize in Literature, rejected being labelled an existentialist, preferring to be called an absurdist. In the opening pages of The Myth of Sisyphus (1942), he states what he considers to be the fundamental question of philosophy: is suicide the correct response to an absurd world? Likening a Godless life to the story of Sisyphus, where he is doomed forever to push a rock up a hill only for it to roll down again, Camus’ answer is "No. It requires revolt. [...] The struggle itself is enough to fill a man’s heart. One must imagine Sisyphus happy." Camus also wrote The Stranger (1942), ranked greatest book of the 20th Century by Le Monde.

==== Beauvoir ====
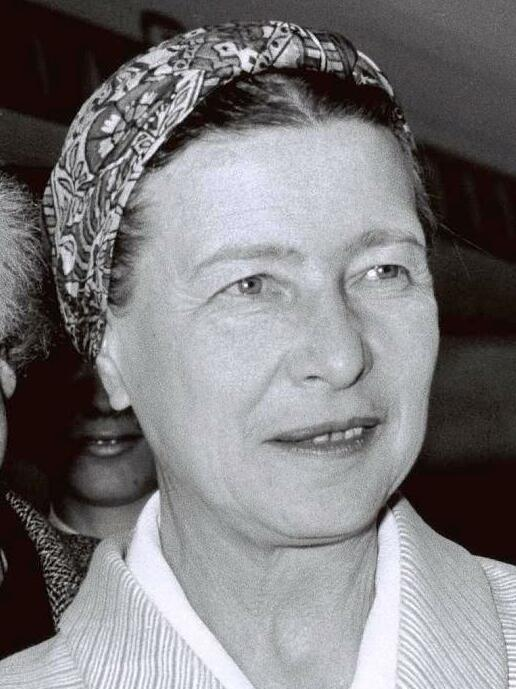
Simone de Beauvoir

Simone de Beauvoir (1908–1986) was an existential feminist. Beauvoir in works like The Second Sex (1949) and The Ethics of Ambiguity (1948) believed that men had surrounded women in a false aura of mystery, stereotyping them into "the other" and an underclass, as an excuse for not understanding them and dominating them. But Beauvoir maintains that Sartre’s thesis (that is, existence precedes essence) applies to women as much as it does to men and that through their choices and actions, women can transcend this aura and reject being the underclass.

=== Structuralism ===
French Structuralism played a major role in intellectual thought after World War II. It rejected existential concepts of freedom for the idea of man as determined by structures. However, by the end of the century it was seen as important not by itself, but for the schools of thought it produced, such as poststructuralism and deconstruction.

==== Ferdinand de Saussure ====
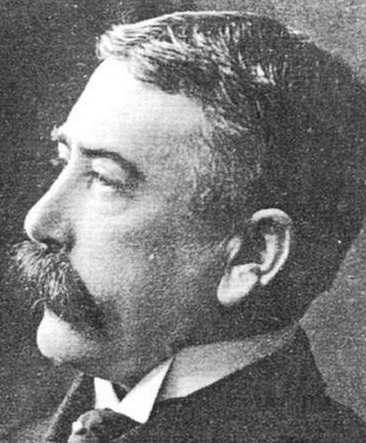
Ferdinand de Saussure founded linguistics, semiotics and structuralism.

Structuralism finds its roots in the thought of Swiss linguist Ferdinand de Saussure (1857–1913), who taught in Paris, bringing the linguistic turn to France. He distinguished linguistics from philology by studying the underlying structures of language, rather than etymology. His small and mostly posthumously published output, such as the Course in General Linguistics (1916), became the foundation for linguistics, semiotics and structuralism.

Saussure divided language into two parts: the langue, the grammatical system of signs and rules, and parole, individual acts of speech. This was likened by Saussure to the difference between the rules of chess and chess pieces.

For Saussure, the essential unit of any language is the word, or sign. Like language, he divides the word into two parts: the signifier, which is the sound-image, and the signified, which is the referent or concept associated with the signifier. Saussure stressed this association was arbitrary, maintaining that any signifier can refer to any signified. A sign obtains its meaning by contrast with what it is not within the langue. For example, the word ‘dog’ means dog simply because it does not mean cat, bird, or cornflakes.

Saussure thought language could be studied synchronically, i.e. as a complete system within a frozen moment of time, or it can be studied diachronically, examining its historical development. It can be said that structuralists focused on the synchronic aspects of culture, while poststructuralists, focused on the diachronic aspects.

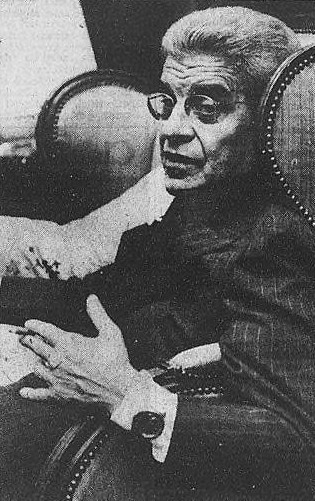
Jacques Lacan, a structuralist psychoanalyst

While Saussure was concerned with linguistics, soon structuralism was influenced by German thinkers such as Marx, Heidegger, and Sigmund Freud; and began to be applied to anthropology, social sciences and psychology.

==== Lévi-Strauss ====
Claude Lévi-Strauss (1908–2009) rejected Sartrean freedom and is the founder of structural anthropology, which sees culture as a system of symbolic communication.

==== Barthes ====
Roland Barthes (1915–1980) applied structuralism to literary theory. In Mythologies (1957), Barthes explored media such as advertisements and films to demonstrate the bourgeois propaganda found within. He described these myths as second-order signs, assigning or associating signifiers to signifiers, such as a bottle signifying wine also signifying high class.

==== Lacan ====
Jacques Lacan (1901–1981) was a structuralist psychoanalyst, who sought to correct perceived errors in Freud’s thought, plus errors in the interpretation of Freud. As well as Marx and Heidegger, Lacan was influenced by G. W. F. Hegel, through scholars Jean Hyppolite (1907–1968) and Alexandre Kojève (1902–1968).

==== Althusser ====
Louis Althusser (1918–1990) and his colleagues, prominently including Étienne Balibar (b. 1942), reworked Marxism using insights from structuralism, against the humanist trend in Sartrean and Western Marxisms. Althusser offered an influential, new reading of Marx's work, describing an "epistemological break" between the Young Hegelian Marx and the late Marx of Das Kapital. Althusser's focus on economics brought him into conflict with social historians, such as E. P. Thompson.

=== Poststructuralism and postmodernism ===
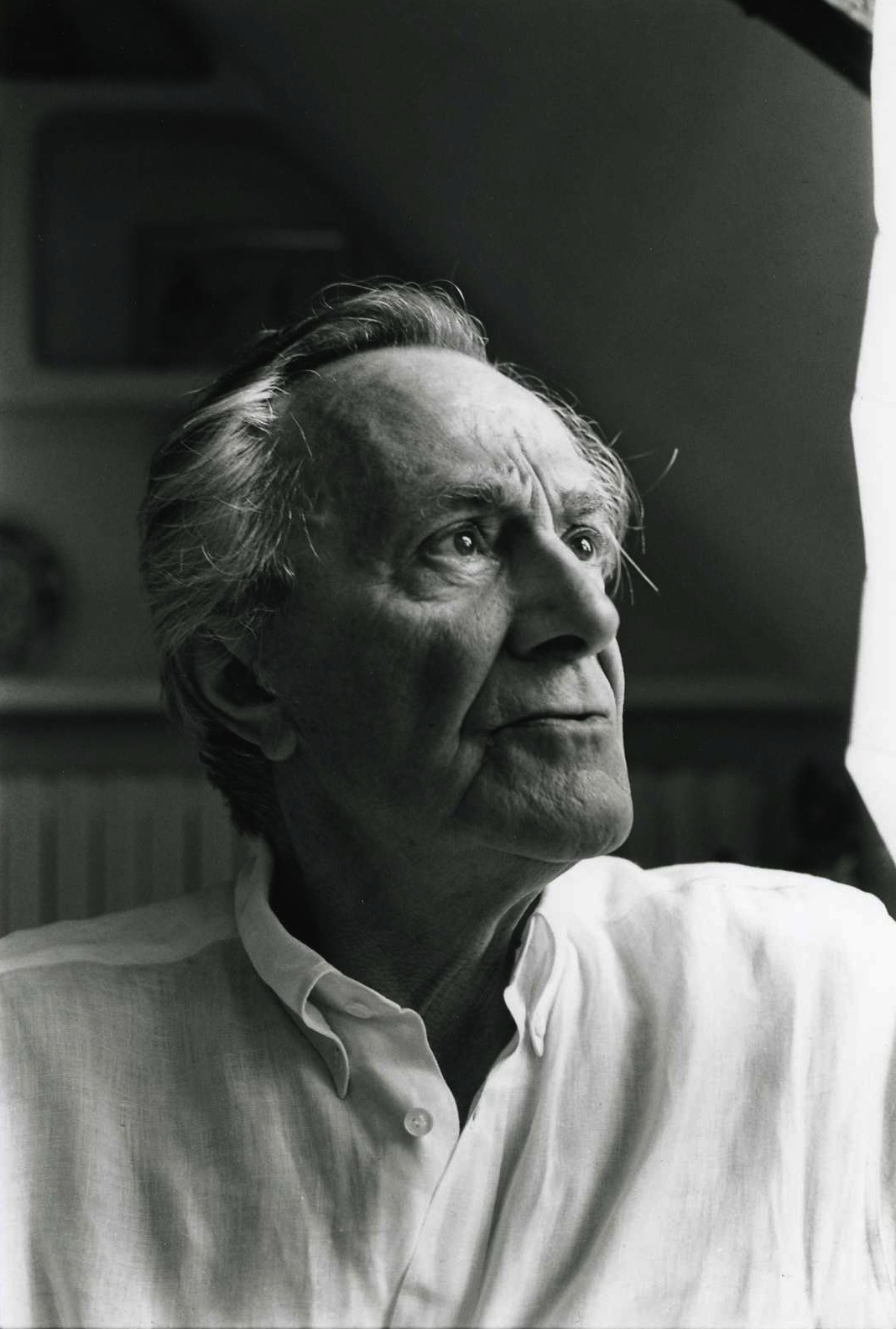
Postmodernist Jean-François Lyotard, photograph by Bracha L. Ettinger, 1995.

The late 20th-century saw the rise of so-called poststructuralist and postmodern thought, especially in France. Postmodernism is fairly hard to define, and some people maintain it is nothing but a slur applied to a group of disparate philosophers wrongly grouped together. However, it can also be seen as a critique of modernity and traditional western thought, influenced heavily by structuralism, phenomenology and existentialism.

==== Lyotard ====
Jean-François Lyotard (1924–1998) defined postmodernism as scepticism toward metanarratives. A metanarrative is a kind of grand arching story that encompasses—and claims to predict—everything. An example is whig history, which sees history as the inevitable march of progress. Another example is Marxism, which sees communism as the inevitable historical, dialectical consequence of class struggle.

Lyotard considered the metanarrative an essential feature of modernity. Hence the postmodern condition is the replacement of metanarratives with several micro-narratives, (Note: Lyotard calls them language games, to be distinguished from the Wittgensteinian notion.) which lack any all-embracing structure, but were brought about by technological developments in such fields as communication and mass media, making metanarratives indefensible.

==== Foucault ====
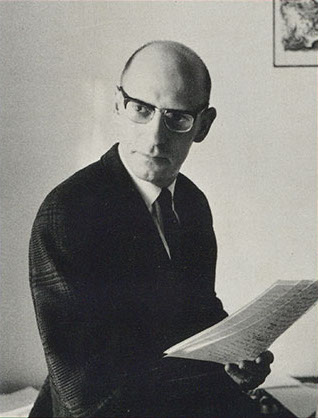
Michel Foucault

Michel Foucault (1926–1984) maintained a similar scepticism about absolutes, such as right and wrong, sane and insane, and human nature. His method was not to deny such notions, but to historicize them, examining what in the supposedly necessary may be contingent, and demonstrating the relationships between power, politics, and knowledge.

Foucault was influenced by Nietzsche, and was anti-Hegelian and anti-teleological in his historical writings. Foucault's four-volume The History of Sexuality introduced the concept of biopower. His early works like The Order of Things (1966) used an "archaeological method" or episteme, while his later work used a "genealogical method" or dispositif.

His main fields of investigation were psychiatry, medicine, and institutions. In Madness and Civilization (1961), he argued psychiatry was not an obvious improvement on previous treatments of the insane, and are a form of controlling defiance of bourgeois society. Foucault introduced the idea of a disciplinary institution in Discipline and Punish (1975).

==== Derrida ====
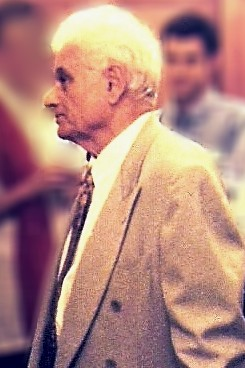
Jacques Derrida

Jacques Derrida (1930–2004) believed Western philosophy had become phonocentric and logocentric. Derrida in works like Of Grammatology (1967) developed deconstruction as a response to structuralism, provocatively stating "there is nothing outside the text."

Derrida maintained that no meaning is stable and opposes binary oppositions. Deconstruction attempts to show the fluidity of the text, allowing highly original interpretations. It examines a text from several different standpoints of interpretation, to show the text is irreconcilably contradictory, unstable, ambiguous and historically and culturally defined. This method is called différance.

==== Baudrillard ====
Jean Baudrillard (1929–2007) in works like Simulacra and Simulation (1981) used the term simulacra to describe the concealment that there are no truths in a given field. An example he gives is the map–territory relation in a Borges story, where a map was so accurate that it laid over and covered the entire city it mapped. When the empire was destroyed, the only object left was the map. For Baudrillard, people live in the map and hence reality crumbles because of misuse. Eventually, the difference between reality and illusion becomes indistinguishable. Baudrillard called this hyperreality.

==== Deleuze ====
Gilles Deleuze (1925–1995) developed a philosophy of difference which valued difference over identity, and the simulacrum higher than the idea and its copy, seen as an inversion of the method of Leibniz (on identity) and Plato (on mimesis). Deleuze led a revitalization of interest in Bergson, through Le Bergsonisme (1966).

Deleuze's best known work is Difference and Repetition (1968). Deleuze and Félix Guattari developed schizoanalysis in Anti-Oedipus (1972) and A Thousand Plateaus (1980). Deleuze also developed a constructivist view of philosophy as the job of developing concepts, as it is the poet’s job to produce poems and the painter’s job to paint paintings. So Deleuze read philosophers in an idiosyncratic way which he once referred to as "buggery;" creating new concepts utterly different from the philosopher he’s reading. An example is Spinoza, whom Deleuze read as an empiricist.

==== Feminism ====
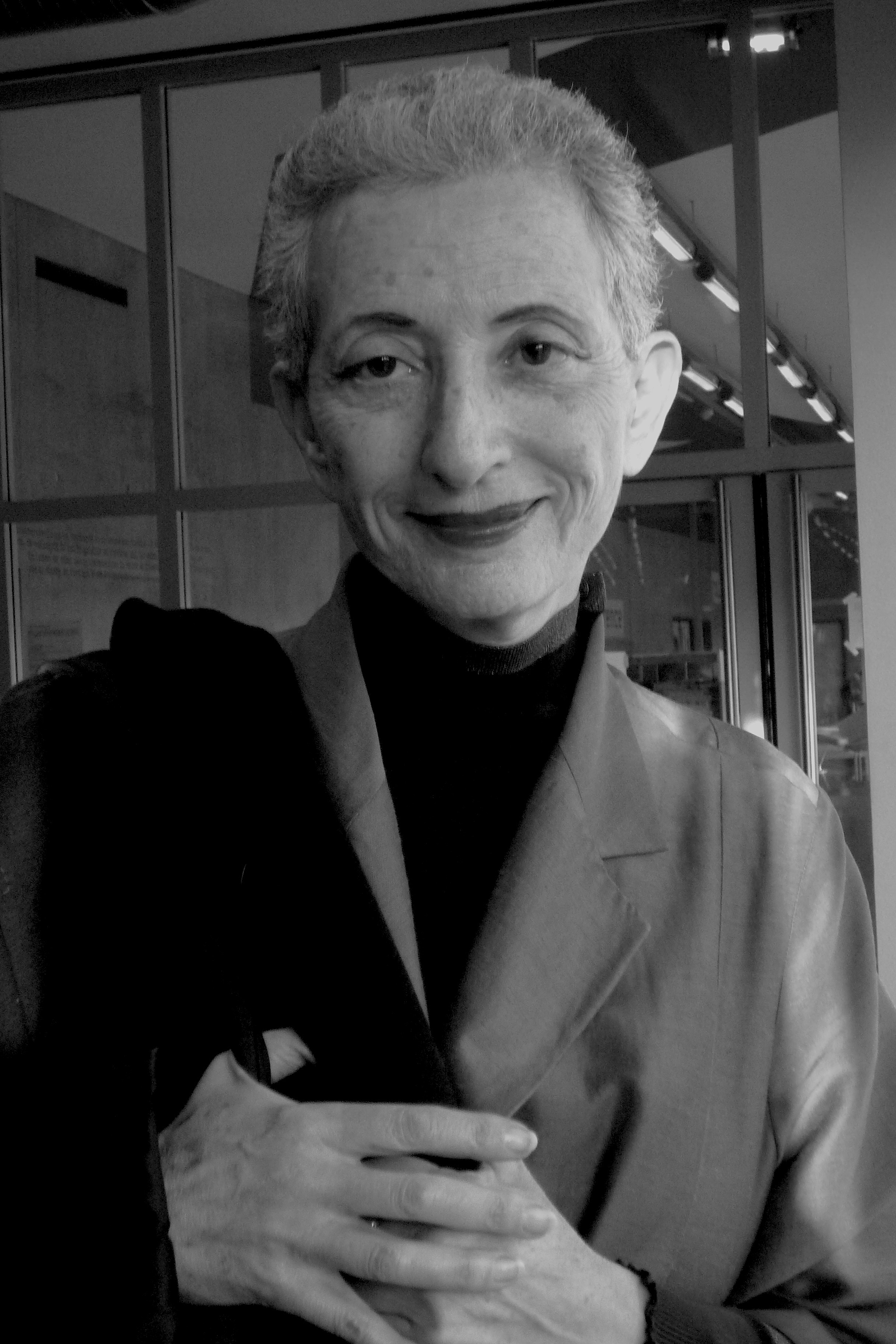
Hélène Cixous

Hélène Cixous (born 1937) developed a feminist interpretation of post-structuralism most influenced by Derrida. She argued that patriarchal cultures build male domination into their language and literary canon, and that a feminist revolution must account for this. She urged female writers to adopt deconstructionist methods and forward their own vision of life as a woman.

Luce Irigaray (born 1930) is a feminist, post-structuralist ostracized by the followers of Lacan. She is considered one of the founders of French difference feminism.

== See also ==
- List of French philosophers
- Non-philosophy
- Speculative realism
