= Guy De Bruès =

- Born: c. 1530; Nîmes, France

Guy de Bruès (b. c. 1530) was a jurist and French philosopher from Nîmes in the circle of logician Petrus Ramus. He wrote Les Dialogues de Guy de Bruès, contre les Nouveaux Academiciens in 1557. It explored skeptical views and had a wide influence. Michel de Montaigne was known to read Bruès. The Dialogues are three discussions, first on metaphysics, then on ethics, then on law. The skeptics are represented in the dialogue by Jean-Antoine Baïf and lawyer Guillaume Aubert.
