= Tobias Andreae (philosopher) =

- Born: 1604; Braunfels, Germany
- Died: October 17, 1676

Tobias Andreae (1604 – October 17, 1676) was a German philosopher and early proponent of Cartesianism who taught at the University of Groningen. He was the grandson of Johannes Piscator. He was also influenced by John Amos Comenius.
