= Henning Arnisaeus =

German philosopher

Henning Arnisaeus (Arniseus) (1570–1636) was a German physician and moral philosopher. He is now known for his writings on political theory.

== Life ==
He was born in Schlanstedt, a village in the present-day Harz district of Germany, near Huy. He studied philosophy and medicine at the Protestant University of Helmstedt from 1589. After travels in England and France, he became court physician to Christian IV of Denmark.

== Views ==
At Helmstedt, Arnisaeus became a pupil of Cornelius Martini, a Lutheran metaphysician who also influenced Hermann Conring. He used an Aristotelian analysis to distinguish in political thought between the civitas and the res publica, in a critique of Jean Bodin, Johannes Althusius, Busius (Paulus Buis or Buys, died 1617), and Bartholomäus Keckermann. He particularly criticized Bodin's strictures on mixed government in his 1606 Doctrina politica. That work also incorporated Tacitean ideas, under the influence of Arnold Clapmar, within the Aristotelian and humanist framework he proposed, attacking the Ramist critics of Aristotle.

While Arnisaeus saw a role for civil society, he did not admit any qualification of the power of the 'magistrate'. In 1610 in De jure majestatis he took Bodin's part against the mixed state; even so, in relation to Holy Roman Empire and its institutions he admitted that sovereignty could in practical terms be distributed among several authorities. He is therefore classed as an 'absolutist', a supporter of absolute monarchy. Theoretically, in the case of the Empire, he argued that sovereignty lay with the Prince-electors. This was very much a minority view among Germans, opposed by Althusius and Keckermann, as well as Hermann Kirchner, Daniel Otto, and Tobias Paurmeister, all of whom took the view that the Emperor was a true monarch.

Against Althusius, he argued that (true) monarchy could be compromised by concessions of power that distorted the 'form' of the state, and that this was a more accurate description of the actual French state.

Arnisaeus died in Copenhagen.

His ideas were influential in the setting up of Danish absolutism.

== Works ==
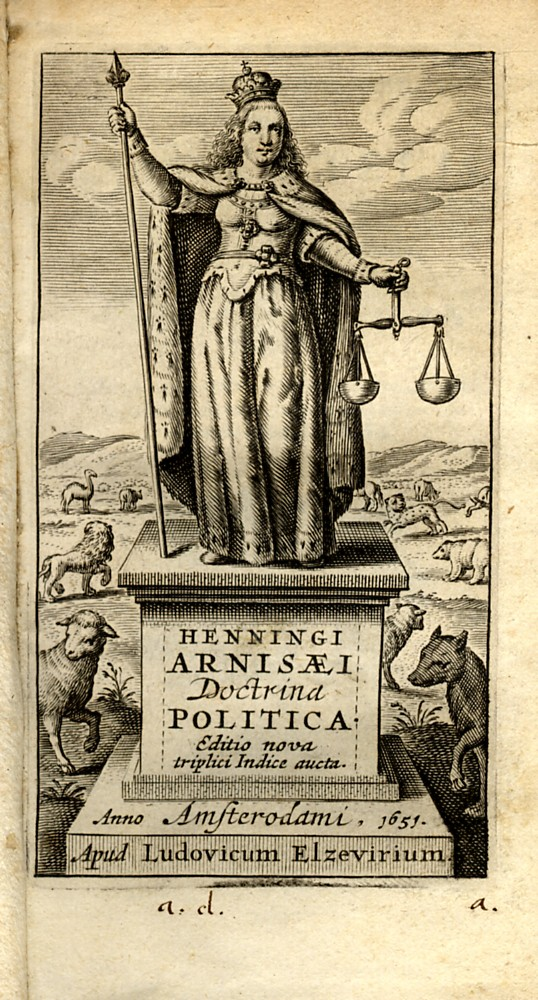
Title page of the 1651 edition of the Doctrina politica.

- Doctrina politica in genuinam methodum, quae est Aristotelis, reducta (1606)
- De constitutione et partibus Metaphysicae, (Frankfurt, 1606)
- Epitome metaphysicae (1606)
- De jure majestatis (Frankfurt, 1610)
- Vindiciae pro Aristotele et Sanioribus quibusque philosophis contra Thomae Rhaedi Scoti pervigilia & dissertationem elencticam de subjecto metaphysicae & natura entis assertae (Frankfurt, 1611). During the period 1608-9 he made a public disputation on metaphysics, with the Scottish philosopher and humanist Thomas Reid (Rhaedus) who was at Rostock. This book was the written form of his reply to Reid.
- De auctoritate principum in populum semper inviolabili (Frankfurt, 1612)
- De subjectione et exemptione clericorum (Frankfurt, 1612)
- De Republica, seu Relectionis politicae libri duo (Argentorati, 1636)
- Opera politica (Strassburg, 1648).
