= Johannes Goddaeus =

German jurist

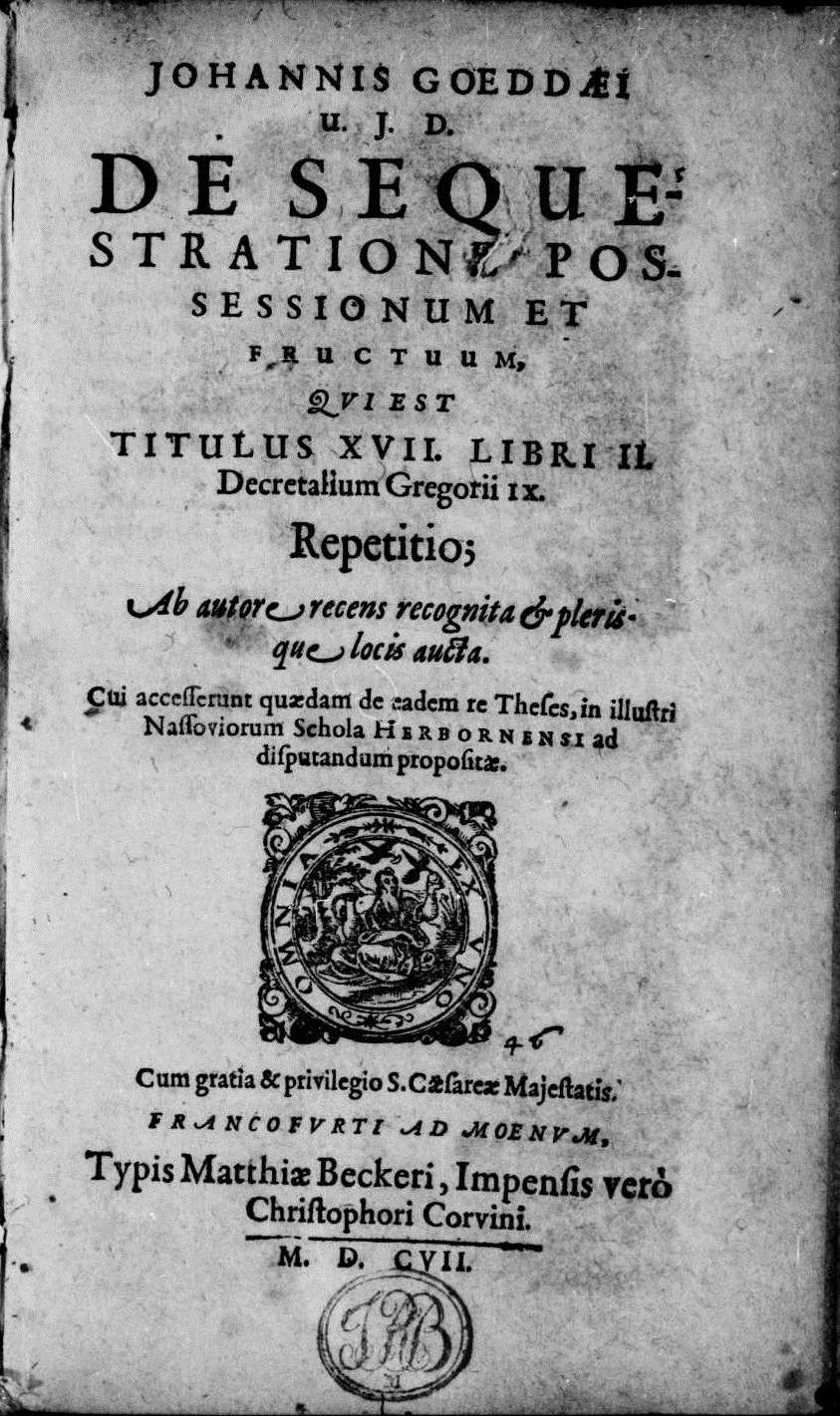
De sequestratione possessionum et fructuum, 1607

Johann Gödde, latinized as Johannes Goddaeus (7 December 1555 – 5 January 1632), was a German jurist.

== Life ==
=== Youth ===
Gödde was born in Schwerte, North Rhine-Westphalia, into a wealthy merchant's family. His father Heinrich Gödde was several times mayor of Schwerte, and his mother Elisabeth née Becker was the daughter of a town councillor of Schwerte. He was the fifth of the couple's six children, but the first to survive childhood. He was originally intended to take over his father's business, but showed his scholarly ability very early, and his parents allowed him to attend school from 1568 at Dortmund, where he learned Latin, Greek and especially Hebrew. In 1570 he moved to study at Deventer, which however he had to leave after only a year because of war. After a short stay in Schwerte he resumed his studies in Dortmund. From 1576 to 1578 he was employed as governor and private tutor of the son of the Vogt Friedrich von der Mark in Dortmund.

=== Education ===
In 1578 he enrolled in the University of Marburg, where he intended to study philosophy but above all theology. Not wanting to participate in the theological controversies of that time, he decided to change to the study of law. As early as 1582, having latinized his own name to "Goddaeus" in the meantime, he was allowed to lecture on the institutions of Roman law. On 29 April 1585 he received a doctorate in utroque iure (i.e., in both civil law and canon law). He then went to the Reichskammergericht at Speyer to learn their litigation procedures. After his appointment as professor of law at the University of Heidelberg was blocked by enemies, he returned to Marburg in 1586 as a reader. The following year the city council of Schwerte elected him mayor, but Goddaeus refused the position to continue his academic career.

=== Herborn School and the University of Marburg ===
On 21 July 1588 he was appointed full professor of law at the Academia Nassauenis in Herborn. There he earned a reputation for being an excellent teacher. In 1592 he also became an advisor to the Count of Nassau and in 1593 he became rector of Herborn Academy. He refused the offer of a professorship of law in Frankfurt an der Oder, but in July 1594 accepted the offer he had received on 27 April as professor in Marburg. In 1605 he was elected rector of the University of Marburg. He remained in Marburg until the end of his life even though he received a series of offers including professorships in Heidelberg, Helmstedt and Franeker, a post as syndicus (legal adviser) of the city of Bremen and in 1626 as royal councillor in Copenhagen.

=== Legal and political appointments ===
In addition to his academic activities, Goddaeus was also active in the law and political management of Landgraviate of Hesse-Marburg, tasks entrusted to him thanks to his profound legal expertise. Already in 1595 he became an assessor at the Marburg court and at the Council of the Landgrave of Hesse. The University appointed him as its representative and parliamentary deputy at Landtage in Kassel, Marburg and Treysa. He was a member of the commission that was intended to resolve the Marburg succession dispute in 1604/05. In 1611 he was appointed a member of the consistory in Marburg. His reputation was so high that in 1624, when Marburg fell temporarily under the rule of Hesse-Darmstadt and from 1625 to 1649 the university was merged with the University of Giessen, Goddaeus was one of only four Marburg professors out of a total of 13 to be retained in post by the Landgrave of Darmstadt.

=== Illness and death ===
From 1623 Goddaeus began to suffer apoplectic attacks more and more often. With age they increased so much that by 1630 he had to give up almost all activities outside the home. He died on 5 January 1632 in Marburg.

=== Family ===
He married in Herborn, on 25 April 1586, Catharina, daughter of Johann Salfeld, financial administrator of Marburg, by whom he had 7 children.

== Works ==
In addition to his dissertation, he published 24 other independent legal works, many of which were published in multiple editions. A collection of the disputations he held (61 in total) was also published as well as a collection of his reports and pronouncements.

- De sequestratione possessionum et fructuum (in Latin). Frankfurt am Main: Matthäus Becker. 1607.
