= Herborn Academy =

Calvinist higher learning institution in Herborn, Hesse, Germany (1584-1817)

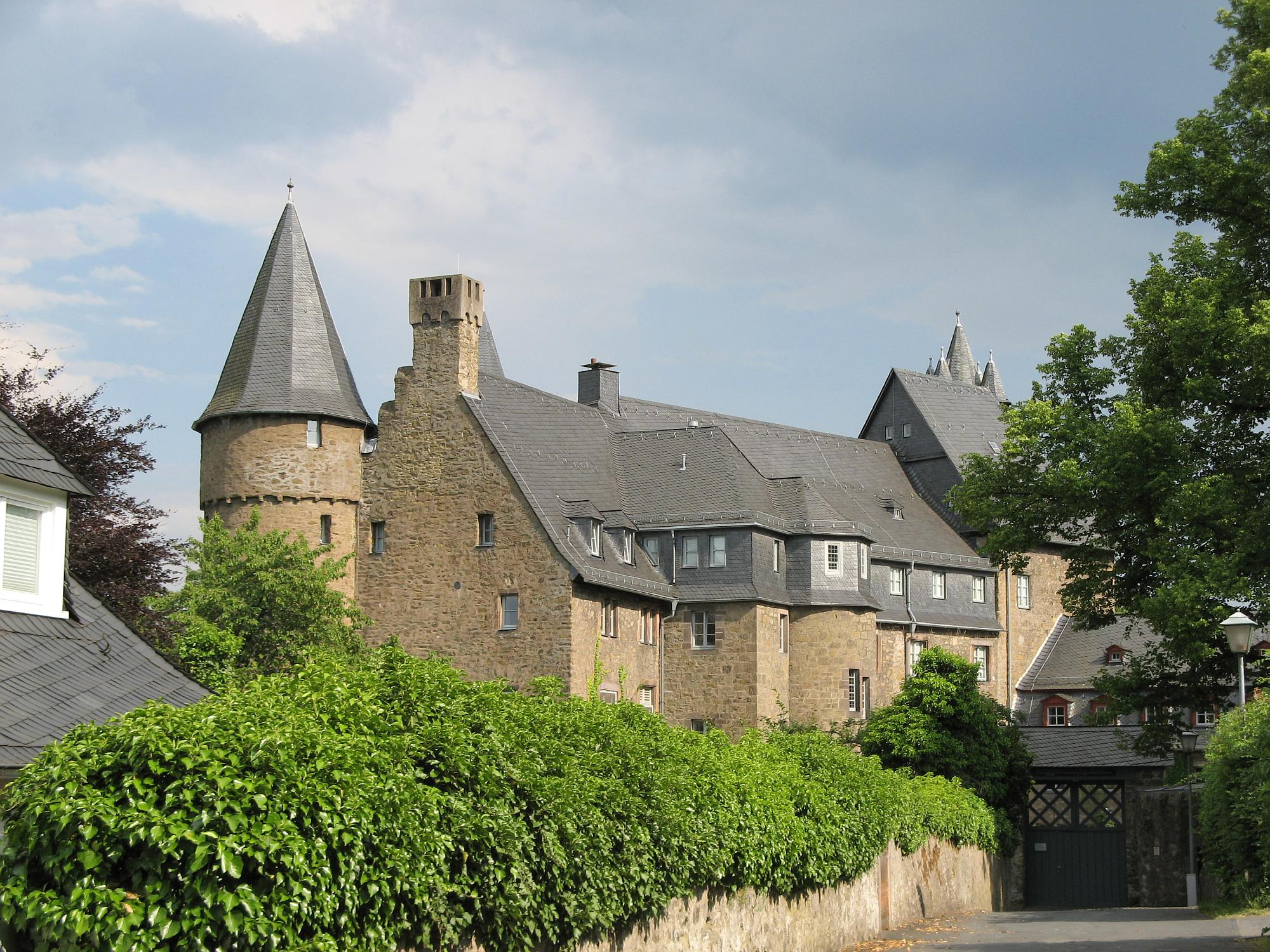
- Herborn Castle, the first location of the Academy from 1588
- Latin: Academia Nassauensis
- Active: 1584–1817
- Founders: Johann VI, Count of Nassau-Dillenburg
- Religious affiliation: Calvinism

The Herborn Academy (Latin: Academia Nassauensis) was a Calvinist institution of higher learning in Herborn from 1584 to 1817. The Academy was a centre of encyclopaedic Ramism and the birthplace of both covenant theology and pansophism. Its faculty of theology continues as the Theological Seminary of the Evangelical Church of Hesse and Nassau. The institution held the principle that every theory has to be functional in practical use, therefore it has to be didactic (i.e. morally instructive).

== History ==
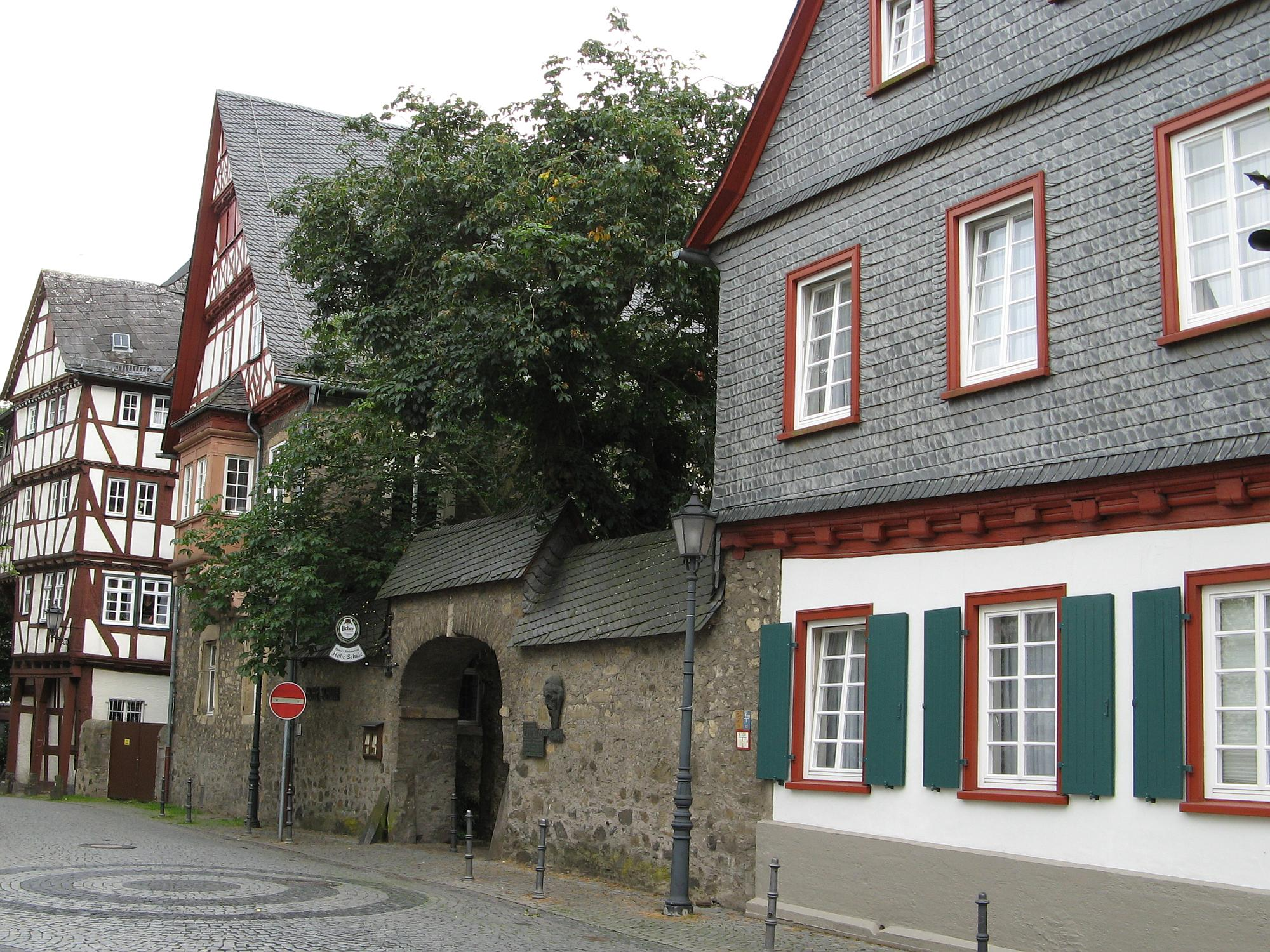
The Buildings of the Academy from 1588 until 1817

In 1584 Count John VI of Nassau-Dillenburg founded the Academia Nassauensis as a post-secondary institution. He established it upon the request of his brother William the Silent, Prince of Orange in the year of the latter's death. The sovereign granted the students two warm meals and three liters of small beer per day. The Academy (Paedagogium) was originally located in the Herborn Castle. In 1588 Johann purchased the old town hall of Herborn and, after expanding it, gave it over for the Academy’s use. This academy, which later took on a distinctively Calvinist cast, was further augmented with four faculties much like a conventional university. It quickly became one of the most important educational locations of the Calvinist-Reformed movement in Europe, becoming well-known as a centre of encyclopaedic Ramism and as the birthplace of covenant theology and pansophism.

Despite repeated efforts and the undisputed quality of the teaching, Herborn Academy was never given the imperial authorization to designate itself a university, largely because it was a Calvinist foundation. As a result, the school never possessed the authority to grant doctorates.

During the period 1594 to 1599/1600 and 1606 to 1609, the Academy moved from Herborn to Siegen, where it was accommodated in the buildings of the lower castle.

Johannes Piscator published a Reformed translation of the Bible at Herborn from 1602 to 1604.

In the first heyday, which lasted until 1626, over 300 students were enrolled in Herborn; for example about 400 in 1603. After 1626 the numbers fell sharply before reaching a second peak from 1685 to 1725. After that point average enrollment in Herborn numbered only about 100. A strong fluctuation in enrollment was the common story in Herborn: at one time in 1745 there were fewer than five students in the town. From its founding in 1584 until its closure in 1817, about 5700 students in total from across Europe studied at the academy. Many came from Switzerland, Bohemia, Moravia, Hungary or Scotland. 1000 came from Herborn itself.

== Closure ==
On 17 December 1811 Napoleon issued a decree for the Duchy of Berg, to which Herborn had been annexed in 1806, to establish a state university in Düsseldorf and to close the Herborn Academy in its favor. After the end of Napoleonic rule, this directive was not overturned and even with the creation of the Duchy of Nassau in 1817, the Academy was not restored. The Academy was abolished in 1817 with only the theological faculty continuing as a theological seminary.

The successor of the Academy, the Theological Seminary of the Evangelical Church of Hesse and Nassau (EKHN), is now located in Herborn Castle. The original buildings are currently used as a hotel and restaurant.

== Faculty ==
1550 - 1650	1651 - 1805
Christoph Pezel Pastor 1578 - 1581	Christopher Wittich Professor of theology, mathematics, and Hebrew 1651–3
Caspar Olevian, Rector 1584 - 1587	Johannes Voet, faculty of law to 1673
Johannes Piscator, Professor 1584 - 1625	Carl Andreas Duker, teacher of history and eloquence 1700 - 1704
Johannes Althusius Professor of Law 1586 - 1592; President 1599 - 1602	Jan Jacob Schultens Professor of Oriental languages 1744–1749
Johannes Goddaeus Professor of Law, 1588 - , Rector 1593 - 1594	Ludwig Harscher von Almendingen, Professor of Law 1794 - 1802
Matthias Martinius, 1596 - 1607
Heinrich Gutberleth, Professor of Philosophy, Logic, Physics, History and Ars Oratoria 1606 - 1619.
Johann Heinrich Alsted, "Alstedius"; Professor of Philosophy and Theology 1608 - 1629
Johannes Clauberg, Professor of philosophy and theology 1649 - 1651

== Graduates ==
- Johannes Buxtorf (1564 – 1629), Hebraist
- Philipp Ludwig II, Count of Hanau-Münzenberg (1576 – 1612)
- Albert of Hanau-Münzenberg (1579 – 1635), Rector of the University of Heidelberg
- Daniel Strejc (1592 - 1669), Moravian minister, son-in-law of John Amos Comenius
- John VIII, Count of Nassau-Siegen (1583 - 1638)
- Johann Heinrich Alting (1583 – 1644), chair of theology at Groningen University
- Ludwig Crocius, (1586 – 1653), Calvinist minister.
- Louis Henry, Prince of Nassau-Dillenburg (1594 - 1662)
- John Amos Comenius, enrolled 1611–1613, "father of modern education"
- Wilhelm von Curti (Sir William Curtius) FRS (1599 - 1678)
- Samuel Hartlib, (c. 1600 – 1662), polymath, the "Great Intelligencer of Europe"
- Johann Heinrich Bisterfeld (1605 – 1655) philosopher, logician and encyclopaedic writer
- Ludwig von Siegen (1609 – c. 1680 ?), inventor of mezzotint
- Johann Just Winckelmann (1620 – 1699) writer, historian
- Henry, Prince of Nassau-Dillenburg (1641 - 1701)
- Friedrich Ludwig Abresch (1699 - 1782), philologist
- Johann Egidius Hecker (1726-1773), reformed pastor 18th century Pennsylvania
- Philip William Otterbein (1726 – 1813), U.S. clergyman, founder of the United Brethren in Christ
- Andreas Balzar (1769 - 1797), "The Black Captain"
- Johann Friedrich Benzenberg (1777 – 1846), astronomer, geologist, and physicist
- Adolph Diesterweg (1790 - 1866), educational reformer
- Theodor Fliedner (1800 – 1864), minister, founder of Lutheran deaconess training
