= Alexander Reid (doctor) =

Scottish physician (c.1586–1643)

Alexander Reid (1586?–1643) was a Scottish physician to Charles I of England.

His brother Thomas Reid (humanist) was Greek and Latin secretary to James I.

== Wikisource link ==
- Lee, Sidney, ed. (1896). "Reid, Alexander (1586?-1641)" . Dictionary of National Biography. Vol. 47. London: Smith, Elder & Co.
