= Simon Baudichon =

French professor

Simon Baudichon, known as Simon Baldichius, was a 16th century French physician, originally from the diocese of Le Mans (Note: He is simply a Champenois following Guillaume Du Val or, according to the Mémoire historique et littéraire sur le Collège Royal de France, his place of birth may be Sens), professor at the Collège royal from 1567 to 1577. He died in 1584.

== Biography ==
Bachelor on 12 March 1554 he obtained his licence from the Faculty of Medicine of Paris on 28 March 1556, under the chairmanship of Arthur Rioust, Doctor Regent in the Faculty of Medicine, with a thesis entitled: An ex suppressis hæmorroïdibus glabrities ? (Note: Does the removal of haemorrhoids lead to the loss of the hair system?) He was admitted as a doctor the same year.

He was considered one of the most skilful practitioners of his time.

In 1568, Charles IX, "always full of benevolence towards his Royal College", created a second chair of medicine in favour of Simon Baudichon who became a royal reader in medicine.

However, having converted to Calvinism, Simon Baudichon was summoned on 30 June 1568 before the King's Attorney General to be heard with Pierre de la Ramée and other professors On 8 October 1570, following the treaty of the Peace of Saint-Germain-en-Laye, the University obtained letters patent restricting the right to teach there to Catholics only. Jacques Charpentier, dean of the faculty of medicine, had Simon Baudichon and five other Protestant doctor-regents excluded.

Baudichon and his colleagues were reinstated from Charles IX himself; on 17 May 1571, they obtained new letters patent from him rehabilitating them in all their rights. "The Faculty of Medicine had to reinstate them but dispensed them from lecturing".

Baudichon remained a teacher at the Royal College until 1577.
