= Nancelius =

- Born: 1539
- Died: 1610 (aged 70–71)

Nicolas Nancel or Nancelius Trachyenus Noviodunensis (1539 – 1610) was a French physician and humanist. He wrote a biography of Petrus Ramus, whom he knew personally.
