= Thomas Reid (humanist) =

Scottish humanist and philosopher

Thomas Reid (Read, Rhaedus) (died 1624) was a Scottish humanist and philosopher who became Latin secretary to King James VI and I.

== Life ==
He was second son of James Reid, minister of Banchory Ternan, Kincardineshire, a cadet of the Pitfoddels family. Alexander Reid (doctor) (1586?–1643) the surgeon, was a younger brother. Thomas was educated at the grammar school, Aberdeen, and at Marischal College and University, where he appears to have graduated M.A. about 1600. In 1602 he was appointed to a mastership in the grammar school, which he resigned in the following year on being chosen one of the regents in Marischal College.

After conducting a university class through the four years of their curriculum, he went to the continent, where he continued his studies, at first in France, and afterwards at the universities of Rostock and Leipzig. While at Rostock, where he was admitted a docent in December 1608, he taught philosophy and humanities for several years; and carried out a disputation on metaphysical subjects with Henningus Arnisæus, then professor of medicine in the University of Frankfurt. He matriculated at Leipzig in the summer of 1613.

Returning to England, he associated with Patrick Young in the translation into Latin of James I's English writings, and in 1618 was appointed Latin secretary to the king, an office which he retained until his death in 1624. In 1620 he was, with his brother Alexander, incorporated M.A. at Oxford.

== Works and legacy ==
Several of his poems appear in the Delitiæ Poetarum Scotorum (Amsterdam, 1637). Reid's major works are:

- De Accidente Proprio Theoremata Philosophica, Rostock, 1609.
- Pervigilium Lunæ de Objecto Metaphysicæ, Rostock, 1609.
- De Ente, Rostock, 1610.
- De Proprietatibus Entis, Rostock, 1610.
- De Veritate et Bonitate Entis, Rostock, 1610.
- De Diversitate Entis, Rostock, 1610.
- De Objecto Metaphysicæ Dissertatio Elenctica, Rostock, 1610.
- Pervigilia Metaphysica Desideratissima, Rostock, 1616.
- Dissertatio quod regibus et licitum et decorum sit scribere in Thomas Smith's Vitae quorundam eruditissimorum et illustrium virorum, London, 1707.

He was also the founder of the first public reference library in Scotland. By his will he bequeathed to the town and new college of Aberdeen his collection of books, and six thousand merks to endow a librarian who would keep the library open four days a week. Reid's collection, which included editions of the classics and manuscripts, now forms a part of the library of the University of Aberdeen; but his endowment was diminished under the management of the town council. From 1733 to 1737 the librarianship was held by Reid's kinsman and namesake, Thomas Reid (1710–1796), the philosopher.

== Attribution ==
- This article incorporates text from a publication now in the public domain: "Reid, Thomas (d.1624)". Dictionary of National Biography. London: Smith, Elder & Co. 1885–1900.
