= Freigius =

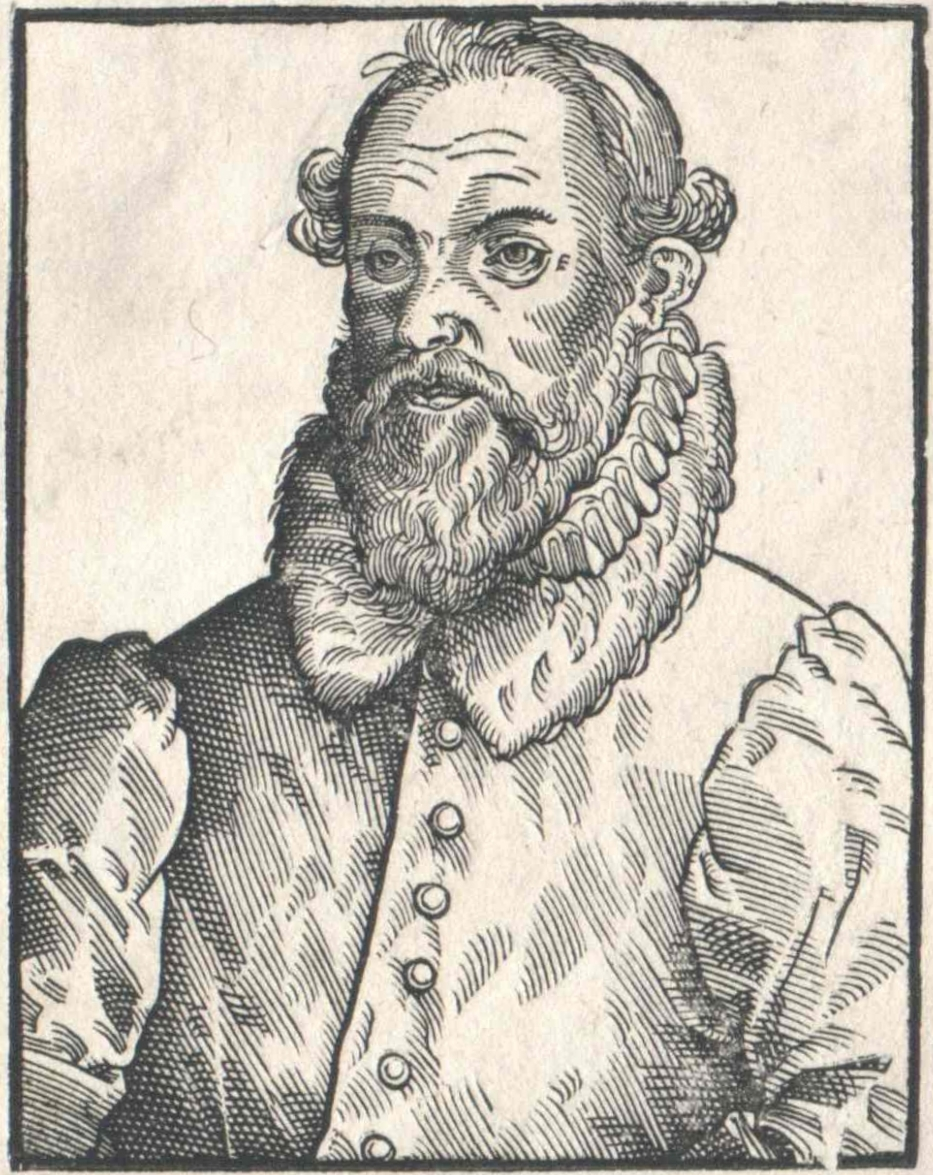
- Born: 1543; Freiburg im Breisgau
- Died: 1583 (aged 39–40); Basel, Switzerland

Johann Thomas Freigius (1543 – 1583) was a disciple of Petrus Ramus. He coined the term psychology.
