= Ludwig Harscher von Almendingen =

German jurist

Ludwig Harscher von Almendingen (25 March 1766 – 16 January 1827) was a German jurist.

== Biography ==
He was born in Paris, and educated by his father until 1789, when he went to Göttingen, where he applied himself to the study of law and history under professors Runde, Hugo, Putter, and Spittler. In 1794, he was elected professor of law at Herborn (Nassau), and two years later he married a daughter of Adam Hoffman, professor of medicine. While he was at Herborn, he received offers from six universities; none of which he accepted, because his aged parents, who lived with him, were opposed to moving, and his wife at Herborn was surrounded by her family. He was a very prolific author at this period, as may be seen by a reference to Meussel's Gelehrtes Deutschland. His writings were varied: sometimes translations from English works, etc.; but chiefly legal treatises and papers relative to civil law, legislation, etc.

In 1802, he accepted the situation of counsellor to the newly erected court of appeal at Hadamar, an office which he filled at Düsseldorf, during the disturbances of Nassau; but being recalled, in 1811, to the service of the duke of Nassau, he became vice-director of the aulic tribunal of Wiesbaden, and referendary of the minister of state. In 1813, being made member of the commission of legislation, he applied himself to the framing several useful legal reforms, most of which have since been adopted. In 1816, he was made vice-president of the aulic tribunal of Dillenburg; and shortly afterwards, he was named counsellor of state.

He had for a long time pleaded the cause of the widowed duchess of Anhalt-Schaumburg (as guardian of her children) against the duke of Anhalt-Bernburg, in a question relative to the validity of the transference of some property; and the course of the suit requiring his presence at Berlin, he went there in 1819; but the views of the question which he took were not recognized by the tribunals. In consequence, he wrote a history of the Anhalt Suit, in which he made some very severe reflections on Prussian legislation. He was, in consequence of this, condemned in 1822, by the authorities at Berlin, to a year's imprisonment; the disgrace of which sentence, although never carried into effect, affected him so deeply as to cause him wholly to retire from society until his death.

== Works ==
His writings are very numerous: the most important are some contributions to a periodical work—the Library of Criminal Law, published by MM. Feuerbach and Grollmann, on the Origin of War and its Influence of Civilization, 1788; on the Progress and Decay of the Sciences, 1789; on the Rights and Constitution of the Germanic Diet during the vacancy of the imperial throne, 1792; a philosophical essay on the Penal Laws of the French Republic; the Past, Present, and Future Condition of Germany considered politically. His works are enumerated, and a very elaborate account of him is to be found in Hasse's Zeitgenossen, 3rd series, vol. i. bd. v.

- Darstellung der rechtlichen Imputation (1803)
- Untersuchungen über das kulpose Verbrechen (1804)
- Vorträge über den ganzen Inhalt des Code Napoleon und seine organischen Umgebungen, 3 vols (Giessen, 1812)
- Politische ansichten über Deutschlands vergangenheit, gegenwart und zukunft (1814)
- Metaphysik des Civil-Processes; oder, Darstellung der obersten Grundsätze des gerichtlichen Verfahrens in den bürgerlichen Rechtsstreitigkeiten. Ein Handbuch für gebildete Geschäftsmänner (1821)
