= Diedenshausen =

Coordinates: 51°4′27″N 8°30′11″E

- Village
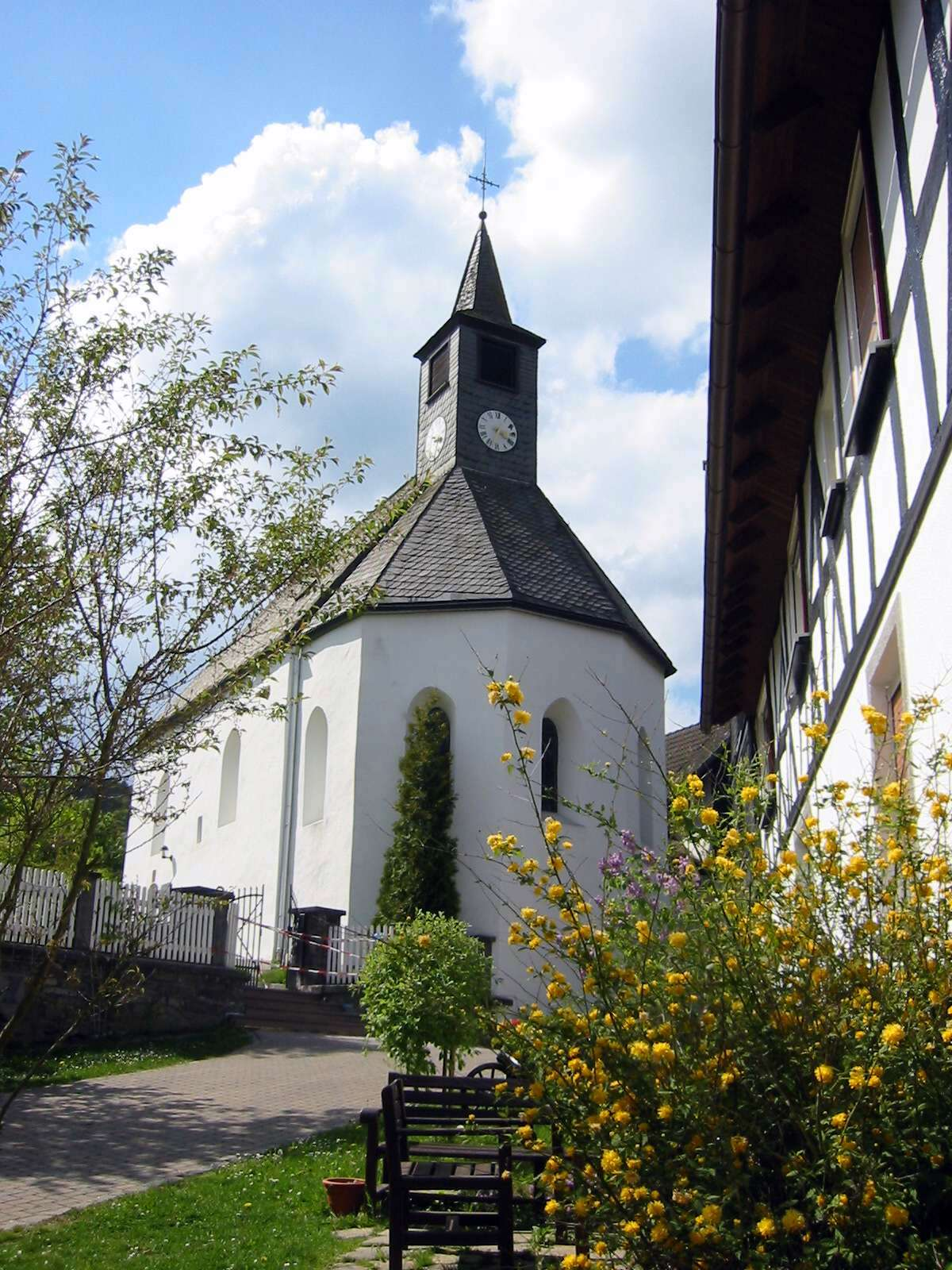
- Diedenshausen Church
- Interactive map of Diedenshausen
- Country: Germany
- State: North Rhine-Westphalia
- Region: Arnsberg
- District: Siegen-Wittgenstein
- Established: 1194

Government
  - Mayor: Ulrich Dienst

Population (2022)
  - Total: 280
- Demonym: Diedenshäuser
- Postal code: 57319/59969
- Area code: 02750

Diedenshausen is a small village, since 1975 a constituent community of Bad Berleburg in Siegen-Wittgenstein district and Arnsberg region in North Rhine-Westphalia in the Federal Republic of Germany. It is located on the east side of the heavily forested Rothaargebirge (Red-haired Mountains), immediately on the border with Hesse. There are a few buildings on the other side of the border. These form the tiny village of Seibelsbach. Although technically being 2 separate places, both operate as one due to the location.

== History ==
The small farming village of Diedenshausen was first mentioned in documents in 1194. The political philosopher Johannes Althusius was born and raised there. The accepted faith of the people was the Reformed doctrine of Calvinism. Native son Daniel Womelsdorf was the first from the village known to emigrate to America in 1724. Native son Jacob Weller von Molsdorf die Schwanfelder and his family were some of the earliest recorded members of this family to emigrate to America, landing in Philadelphia in 1710.

Today, the village has a large number of restored half-timbered houses for which reason it was designated by the German government, in 1998, as one of the "Federal Golden Villages". In 2008 Diedenshausen celebrated its millennium (1000th anniversary) as a dedicated village/area which drew many American descendants to celebrate as well.
