= Petrus Ramus =

French philosopher (1515–1572)

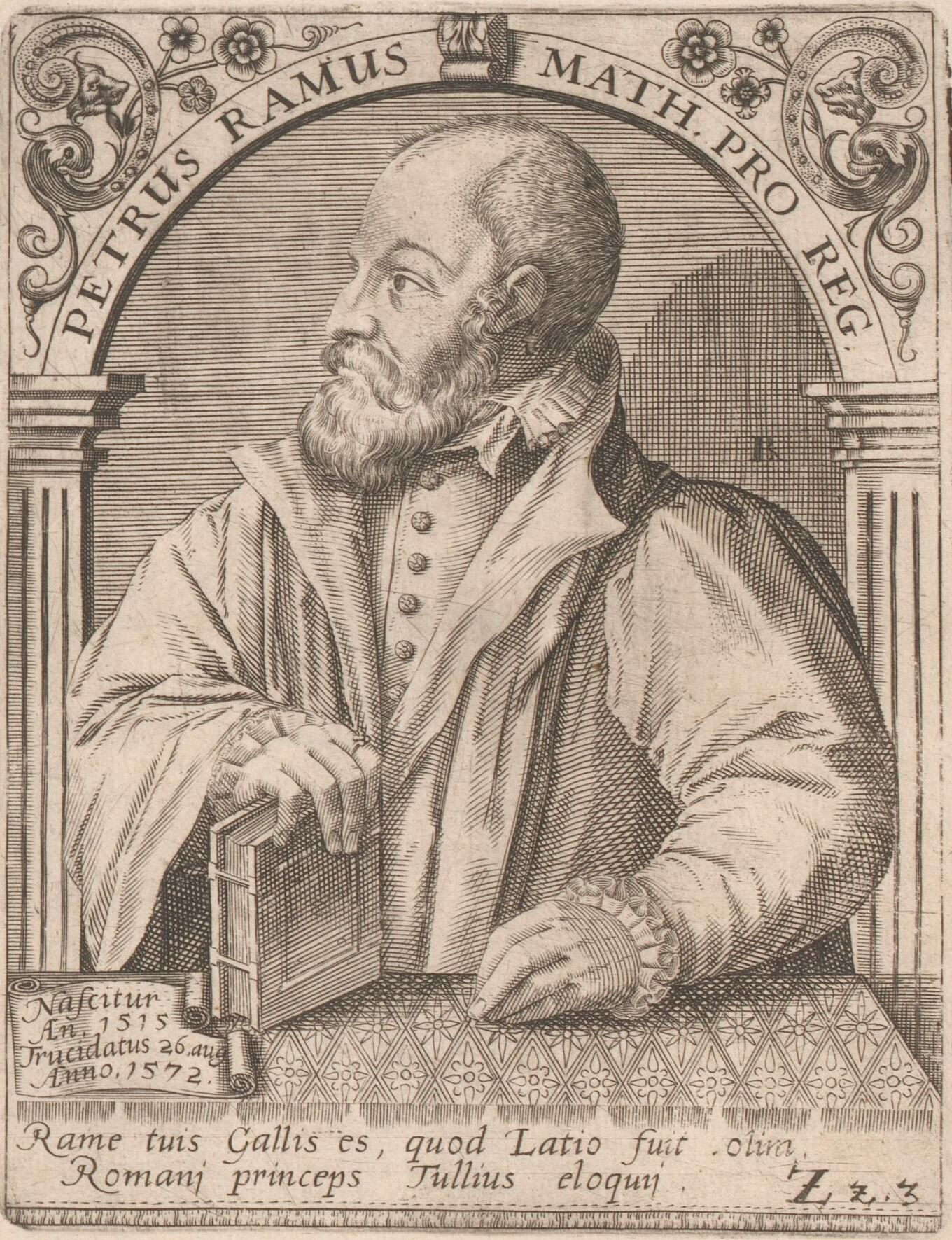
- Born: Pierre de La Ramée; 1515; Cuts, Picardy, France
- Died: 26 August 1572 (aged 56–57); Paris, France

Education
- Education: Collège de Navarre
- Thesis: Quaecumque ab Aristotele dicta essent, commentitia esse (Everything that Aristotle has said is false) (1536)
- Academic advisor: Johannes Sturm

Philosophical work
- Era: Renaissance philosophy
- Region: Western philosophy
- School: Renaissance humanism Ramism
- Institutions: Collège de France
- Notable students: Theodor Zwinger
- Main interests: Logic, educational reform
- Notable works: Aristotelicae Animadversiones
- Notable ideas: Ramism

Petrus Ramus (French: Pierre de La Ramée; Anglicized as Peter Ramus /ˈreɪməs/; 1515 – 26 August 1572) was a French humanist, logician, and educational reformer. A prominent and controversial academic and professor in Paris' College De France, Ramus became famous for his iconoclastic critiques of Aristotle, Cicero, and Quintilian. Ramus argued that dialectic should be removed or separated from the purview of rhetoric, a stance which significantly narrowed rhetorical theory's scope. A convert to Protestantism, he was a victim of the St. Bartholomew's Day massacre.

== Early life ==
He was born at the village of Cuts, Picardy; his father was a farmer. He gained admission at age twelve (thus about 1527) to the Collège de Navarre, working as a servant. A reaction against scholasticism was in full tide, at a transitional time for Aristotelianism. On the occasion of receiving his M.A. degree in 1536, Ramus allegedly took as his thesis Quaecumque ab Aristotele dicta essent, commentitia esse (Everything that Aristotle has said is false), which Walter J. Ong paraphrases as follows:

All the things that Aristotle has said are inconsistent because they are poorly systematized and can be called to mind only by the use of arbitrary mnemonic devices.

According to Ong this kind of spectacular thesis was in fact routine at the time. Even so, Ong raises questions as to whether Ramus actually ever delivered this thesis.

== Early academic career ==
Ramus, as graduate of the university, started courses of lectures. At this period he was engaged in numerous separate controversies. One opponent in 1543 was the Benedictine Joachim Périon. He was accused, by Jacques Charpentier, professor of medicine, of undermining the foundations of philosophy and religion. Arnaud d'Ossat, a pupil and friend of Ramus, defended him against Charpentier. Ramus was made to debate Goveanus (Antonio de Gouveia), over two days. The matter was brought before the parlement of Paris, and finally before Francis I. By him it was referred to a commission of five, who found Ramus guilty of having "acted rashly, arrogantly and impudently," and interdicted his lectures (1544).

== Royal support ==
He withdrew from Paris, but soon afterwards returned, the decree against him being canceled by Henry II, who came to the throne in 1547, through the influence of Charles, Cardinal of Lorraine. He obtained a position at the Collège de Navarre.

In 1551 Henry II appointed him a regius professor at the Collège de France, but at his request he was given the unique and at the time controversial title of Professor of Philosophy and eloquence. For a considerable time he lectured before audiences numbering as many as 2,000. Pierre Galland, another professor there, published Contra novam academiam Petri Rami oratio (1551), and called him a "parricide" for his attitude to Aristotle. The more serious charge was that he was a nouveau academicien, in other words a sceptic. Audomarus Talaeus (Omer Talon c.1510–1581), a close ally of Ramus, had indeed published a work in 1548 derived from Cicero's description of Academic scepticism, the school of Arcesilaus and Carneades.

== After conversion ==
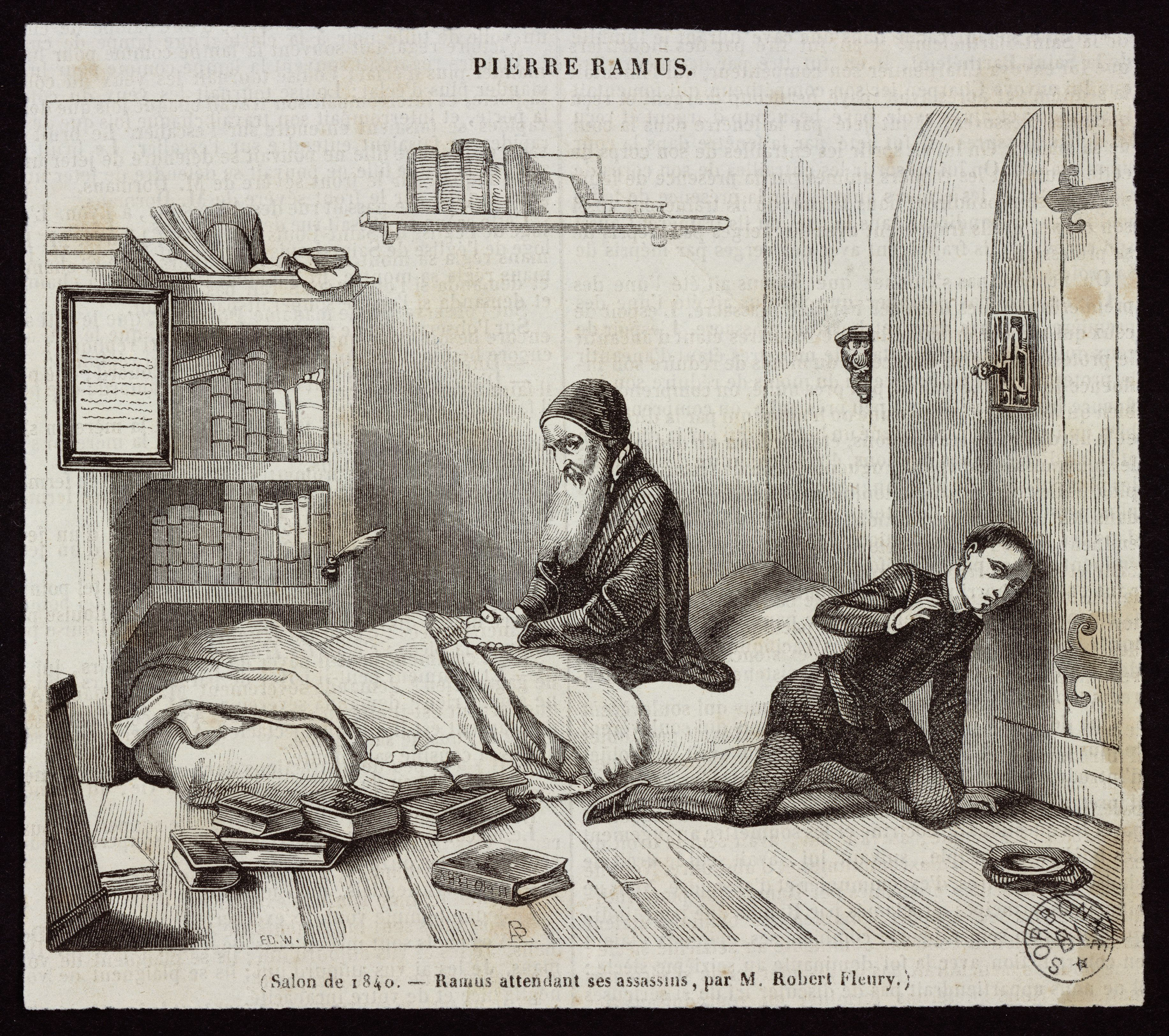
Ramus awaiting his murderers: wood engraving by Joseph-Nicolas Robert-Fleury, 1840

In 1561 he faced significant enmity following his adoption of Protestantism. He had to flee from Paris; and, though he found asylum in the palace of Fontainebleau, his house was pillaged and his library burned in his absence. He resumed his chair after this for a time, but he was summoned on 30 June 1568 before the King's Attorney General to be heard with Simon Baudichon and other professors: the position of affairs was again so threatening that he found it advisable to ask permission to travel.

He spent around two years in Germany and Switzerland. The La Rochelle Confession of Faith earned his disapproval, in 1571, rupturing his relationship with Theodore Beza and leading Ramus to write angrily to Heinrich Bullinger.

Returning to France, he fell a victim in the St. Bartholomew's Day Massacre (1572). Hiding for a while in a bookshop off the Rue St Jacques, he returned to his lodgings, on 26 August, the third day of the violence. There he was stabbed while at prayer. Suspicions against Charpentier have been voiced ever since. His death was compared by one of his first biographers, his friend and colleague Nicolas de Nancel, to the murder of Cicero.

== Pedagogue ==
A central issue is that Ramus's anti-Aristotelianism arose out of a concern for pedagogy. Aristotelian philosophy, in its Early Modern form as scholasticism showing its age, was in a confused and disordered state. Ramus sought to infuse order and simplicity into philosophical and scholastic education by reinvigorating a sense of dialectic as the overriding logical and methodological basis for the various disciplines.

He published in 1543 the Aristotelicae Animadversiones and Dialecticae Partitiones, the former a criticism on the old logic and the latter a new textbook of the science. What are substantially fresh editions of the Partitiones appeared in 1547 as Institutiones Dialecticae, and in 1548 as Scholae Dialecticae; his Dialectique (1555), a French version of his system, is the earliest work on the subject in the French language.

In the Dialecticae partitiones Ramus recommends the use of summaries, headings, citations and examples. Ong calls Ramus's use of outlines, "a reorganization of the whole of knowledge and indeed of the whole human lifeworld."

After studying Ramus's work, Ong concluded that the results of his "methodizing" of the arts "are the amateurish works of a desperate man who is not a thinker but merely an erudite pedagogue". On the other hand, his work had an immediate impact on the issue of disciplinary boundaries, educators largely having accepted his arguments by the end of the 17th century.

== Rhetorician ==
As James Jasinski explains, "the range of rhetoric began to be narrowed during the 16th century, thanks in part to the works of Peter Ramus." In using the word "narrowed," Jasinski is referring to Ramus's argument for divorcing rhetoric from dialectic (logic), a move that had far reaching implications for rhetorical studies and for popular conceptions of public persuasion. Contemporary rhetoricians have tended to reject Ramus's view in favor of a more wide ranging (and in many respects, Aristotelian) understanding of the rhetorical arts as encompassing "a [broad] range of ordinary language practices." Rhetoric, traditionally, had had five parts, of which inventio (invention) was the first. Ramus insisted on rhetoric to be studied alongside dialectic through two main manuals: invention and judgement under the dialectic manual, and style and delivery in the rhetoric manual. Memory, one of the five skills of traditional rhetoric, was regarded by Ramus as being part of psychology, as opposed to being part of rhetoric, and thus dispensed from his idea of rhetoric and dialectic. Brian Vickers said that the Ramist influence here did add to rhetoric: it concentrated more on the remaining aspect of elocutio or effective use of language, and emphasised the role of vernacular European languages (rather than Latin). Ramist reforms strengthened the rhetoricians' tendency to focus on style. The effect was that rhetoric was applied in literature.

Invention involves fourteen topics, including definition, cause, effect, subject, adjunct, difference, contrary, comparison, similarity, and testimony. Style encompasses four tropes: metaphor, synecdoche, metonymy, and irony. It also includes rules for poetic meter and rhythmical prose, figures corresponding to attitudes a speaker may take, and of repetition. Delivery covers the use of voice and gestures.

His rhetorical leaning is seen in the definition of logic as the ars disserendi; he maintains that the rules of logic may be better learned from observation of the way in which Cicero persuaded his hearers than from a study of Aristotle's works on logic (the Organon).

Logic falls, according to Ramus, into two parts: invention (treating of the notion and definition) and judgment (comprising the judgment proper, syllogism and method). Here he was influenced by Rodolphus Agricola. This division gave rise to the jocular designation of judgment or mother-wit as the "secunda Petri". But what Ramus does here in fact redefines rhetoric. There is a new configuration, with logic and rhetoric each having two parts: rhetoric was to cover elocutio and pronuntiatio. In general, Ramism liked to deal with binary trees as method for organising knowledge.

== Mathematician ==
He was also known as a mathematician, a student of Johannes Sturm. It has been suggested that Sturm was an influence in another way, by his lectures given in 1529 on Hermogenes of Tarsus: the Ramist method of dichotomy is to be found in Hermogenes.

He had students of his own. He corresponded with John Dee on mathematics, and at one point recommended to Elizabeth I that she appoint him to a university chair.

The views of Ramus on mathematics implied a limitation to the practical: he considered Euclid's theory on irrational numbers to be useless. The emphasis on technological applications and engineering mathematics was coupled to an appeal to nationalism (France was well behind Italy, and needed to catch up with Germany).

== Ramism ==
The teachings of Ramus had a broadly based reception well into the seventeenth century. Later movements, such as Baconianism, pansophism, and Cartesianism, in different ways built on Ramism, and took advantage of the space cleared by some of the simplifications (and oversimplifications) it had effected. The longest-lasting strand of Ramism was in systematic Calvinist theology, where textbook treatments with a Ramist framework were still used into the eighteenth century, particularly in New England.

The first writings on Ramism, after the death of Ramus, included biographies, and were by disciples of sorts: Freigius (1574 or 1575), Banosius (1576), Nancelius (1599), of whom only Nancelius was closely acquainted with the man. Followers of Ramus in different fields included Johannes Althusius, Caspar Olevianus, John Milton, Johannes Piscator, Rudolph Snellius and Hieronymus Treutler.

== Works ==
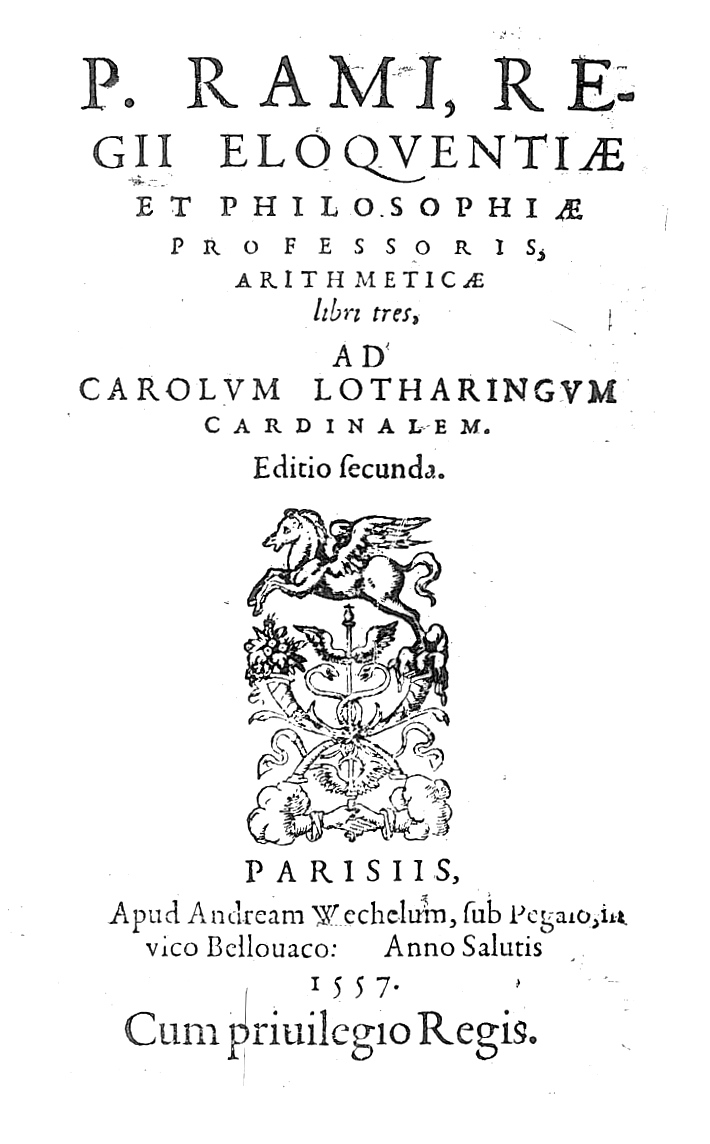
Arithmeticae libri tres, 1557

He published fifty works in his lifetime and nine appeared after his death. Ong undertook the complex bibliographical task of tracing his books through their editions.

- Aristotelicae Animadversiones (1543)
- Brutinae questiones (1547)
- Rhetoricae distinctiones in Quintilianum (1549)
- Dialectique (1555)
- Arithmétique (1555)
- De moribus veterum Gallorum (Paris, 1559; second edition, Basel, 1572)
- Liber de Cæsaris Militia Paris, 1584
- Advertissement sur la réformation de l'université de Paris, au Roy, Paris, (1562)
- Three grammars: Grammatica latina (1548), Grammatica Graeca (1560), Grammaire Française (1562)
- Scolae physicae, metaphysicae, mathematicae (1565, 1566, 1578)
- Prooemium mathematicum (Paris, 1567)
- Scholarum mathematicarum libri unus et triginta (Basel, 1569) (his most famous work)
- Commentariorum de religione christiana (Frankfurt, 1576)

== See also ==
- Mnemonics
- Ramism
