= Banosius =

Banosius or Théophile de Banos (died c. 1595) was a Huguenot pastor and author, originally from Bordeaux. He wrote of a biography of Petrus Ramus. Banosius was preacher in Frankfurt 1572 to 1578.
