= Cuts, Oise =

Cuts
- Commune
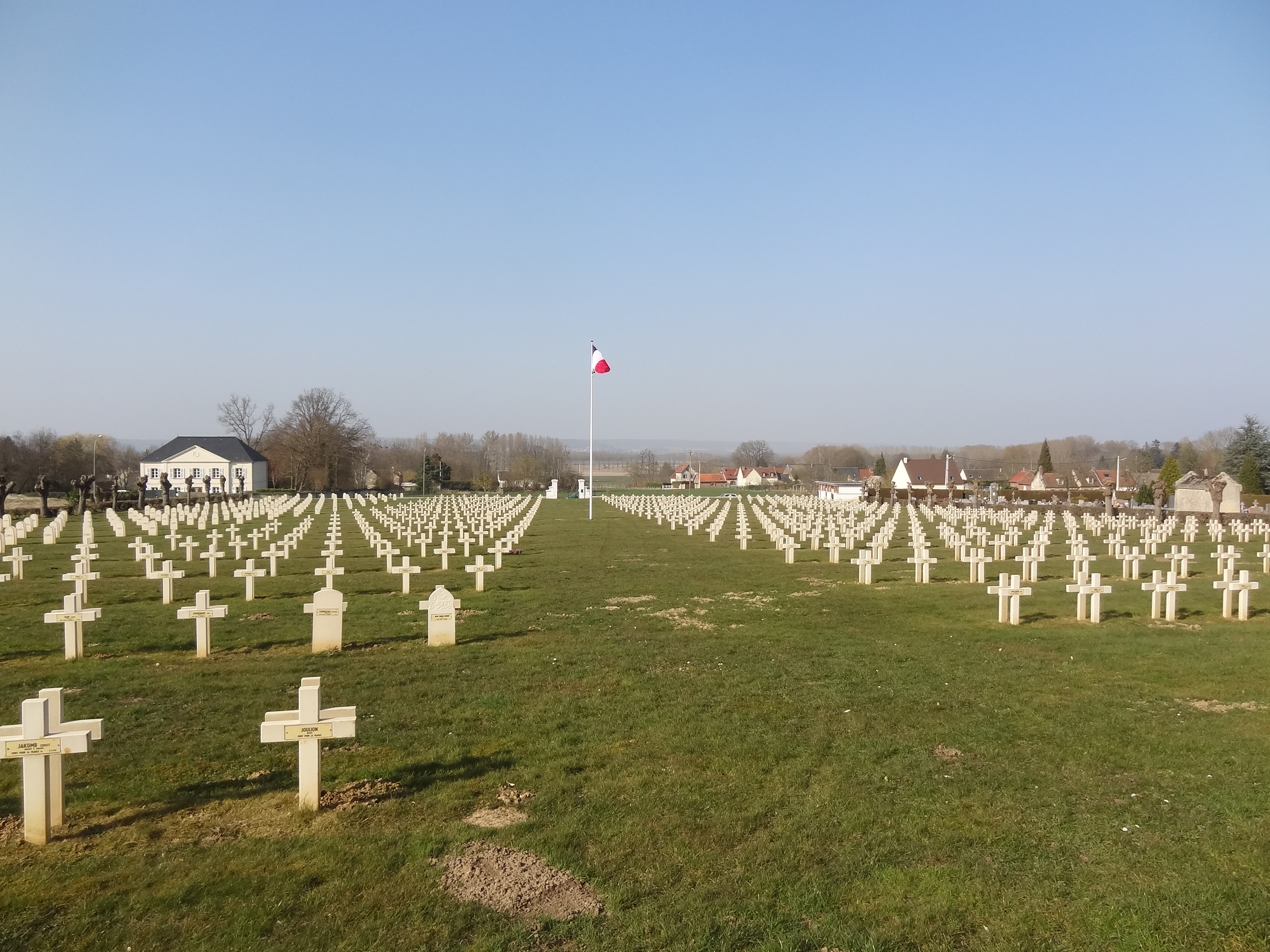
- The national necropolis in Cuts

- Coat of arms
- Location of Cuts
- Location within France Location within Hauts-de-France
- Coordinates: 49°31′55″N 3°06′02″E
- Country: France
- Region: Hauts-de-France
- Department: Oise
- Arrondissement: Compiègne
- Canton: Noyon
- Intercommunality: Pays Noyonnais

Government
  - Mayor (2020–2026): Guy Godefroy
- Area^{1}: 10.78 km^{2} (4.16 sq mi)
- Elevation: 79 m (259 ft)
- Highest elevation: 155 m (509 ft)
- Lowest elevation: 47 m (154 ft)
- Population (2023): 949
  - Density: 88.0/km^{2} (228/sq mi)
- Time zone: UTC+01:00 (CET)
  - Summer (DST): UTC+02:00 (CEST)
- INSEE/Postal code: 60189 /60400
- ^{1} French Land Register data, which excludes lakes, ponds, glaciers > 1 km^{2} (0.386 sq mi or 247 acres) and river estuaries.

Cuts is a commune in the Oise department in northern France.

== Notable person ==
- Petrus Ramus (1515–1572), humanist, logician, and educational reformer, was born in Cuts

== See also ==
- Communes of the Oise department
