= Dudley Fenner =

English puritan divine

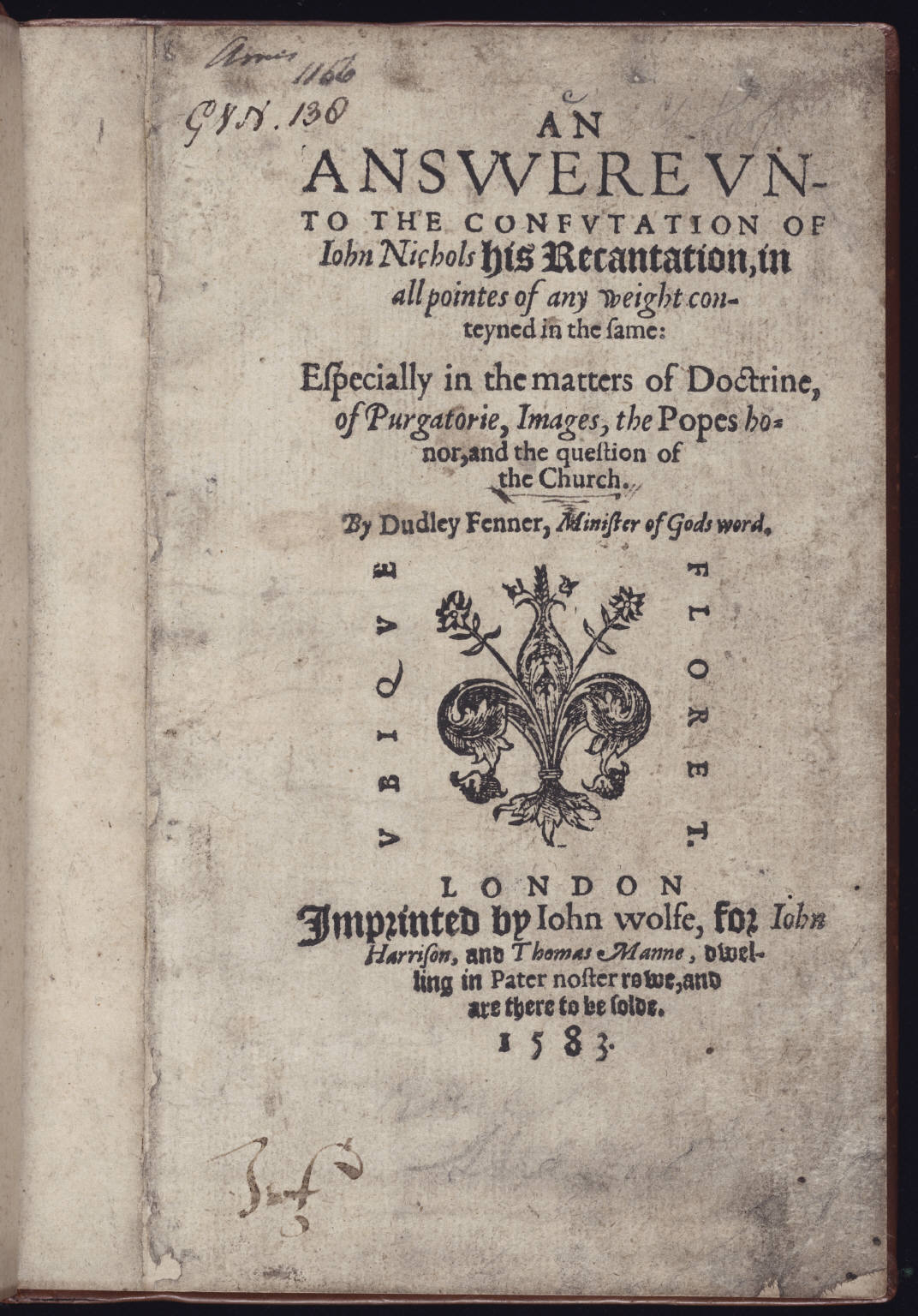
Title page, An Answere unto the Confutation of John Nichols his Recantation, in all pointes of any weight conteyned in the same especially in the matters of doctrine, of purgatorie, images, the Popes honor, and the question of the church, by Dudley Fenner, printed by John Wolfe, London, 1583

Dudley Fenner (c. 1558–1587) was an English puritan divine. He helped popularise Ramist logic in the English language. Fenner was also one of the first theologians to use the term "covenant of works" to describe God's relationship with Adam in the Book of Genesis.

== Life ==
He was born in Kent and educated at Peterhouse, Cambridge. There he became an adherent of Thomas Cartwright, and publicly expounded his presbyterian views, with the result that he was obliged to leave Cambridge without taking his degree. For some months he seems to have assisted the vicar of Cranbrook, Kent, but it is doubtful whether he received ordination.

He next followed Cartwright to Antwerp, and, having received ordination according to rite of the Reformed church, assisted Cartwright for several years in preaching to the English congregation there. The leniency shown by Archbishop Grindal to puritans encouraged him to return to England, and he became curate of Cranbrook in 1583. In the same year, however, he was one of seventeen Kentish ministers suspended for refusing to sign an acknowledgement of the Queen's supremacy and of the authority of the Prayer Book and articles. He was imprisoned for a time, but eventually regained his liberty and spent the remainder of his life as chaplain in the Reformed church at Middelburg.

Fenner and his wife, Joan, had four daughters:

- More-fruit Fenner (died 1602)
- Free-gift Fenner (born before 1583, died September 1583)
- Faint-not Fenner (baptized 1585, died 1604)
- Well-abroad Fenner

== Works ==
A list of his authentic works is given in Cooper's Athenae Cantabrigienses (Cambridge, 1858-1861). They rank among the best expositions of the principles of Puritanism. His textbook, The Arts of Logic and Rhetoric, was a popular textbook on the Ramist school of logic; it used Scripture passages to demonstrate his theories. His major work was Sacra theologia (Geneva, 1585).
