= Johannes Althusius =

German-Dutch jurist and political philosopher

- Surname also: Althus, Althusen or Althaus
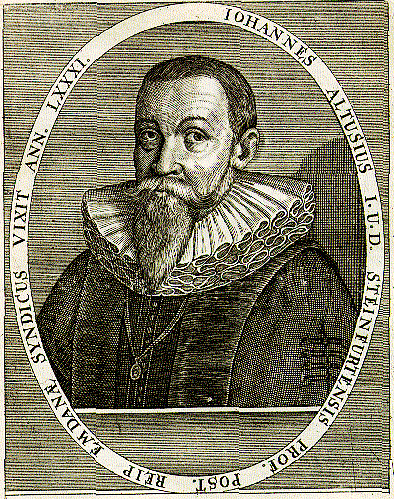
- Johannes Althusius, engraving by Jean-Jacques Boissard.
- Born: 1563; Diedenshausen, Sayn-Wittgenstein, Holy Roman Empire
- Died: August 12, 1638; Emden, East Frisia, Holy Roman Empire

Education
- Education: University of Basel

Philosophical work
- Era: Renaissance / Early Modern
- Region: Western philosophy
- School: Calvinism, Ramism
- Main interests: Political philosophy, Jurisprudence, Theology
- Notable ideas: Modern Federalism, Subsidiarity, popular Sovereignty, Consociatio Symbiotica

Johannes Althusius (1563 – August 12, 1638) was a German–Dutch jurist and Calvinist political philosopher.

He is best known for his 1603 work Politica Methodice Digesta, Atque Exemplis Sacris et Profanis Illustrata (Note: Latin for "Politics Methodically Digested, Illustrated with Sacred and Profane Examples".) which revised editions were published in 1610 and 1614. The ideas expressed therein relate to the early development of federalism in the 16th and 17th centuries and the construction of subsidiarity.

== Biography ==
Johannes Althusius was born in 1563 to a family of modest means in Diedenshausen, County Sayn-Wittgenstein (Siegen-Wittgenstein), a Calvinist County in what is now the state of North Rhine Westphalia (but was then the seat of an independent Grafschaft or County). Under the patronage of a local count, he attended the Gymnasium Philippinum in Marburg from 1577 and began his studies in 1581, concentrating in law and philosophy. He first studied Aristotle in Cologne, then studied law around 1585/86 under Denis Godefroy at Basel. In 1586, Althusius received his doctorate in civil and canon law from the University of Basel. While studying at Basel, Althusius lived with Johannes Grynaeus for a period of time, with whom he studied theology.

After completing his studies in 1586, Althusius became the first professor of law at the Protestant-Calvinist Herborn Academy of Nassau County. From 1592 to 1596, he taught at the Calvinist Academy in Burgsteinfurt/Westphalia. He married, in 1595/96 at Siegen, Margarethe (née Neurath) (1574–1624), with whom he had six children; she also had a daughter from her first marriage (Maria Clara, by Johannes Keßler), of whom Althusius became stepfather. In 1599 he was appointed president of the Nassau College in its temporary location in Siegen, returning with it to Herborn in 1602. At the same time he began his political career by serving as a member of the Nassau (Germany) county council.

For the next several years Althusius was involved in several colleges in the area, variously serving as their president and lecturing on law and philosophy. In 1603 he was elected as a municipal trustee of the city of Emden, in East Frisia, where he ultimately made his fame. He became a city Syndic in 1604, which placed him at the helm of Emden's governance until his death.

In 1617 Althusius published his principal judicial work, Dicaeologicae. In this work, he categorized laws into two main types: natural laws and positive laws, and argued that natural law is "the will of God for men." Althusius contended that terms such as "common law" and "moral law" were other names for natural law. To know the true dictates of natural law, he argued, we must carefully study Scripture and tradition, as well as revelation and reason.

Johannes Althusius died on August 12, 1638, in Emden.

=== Political legacy ===
After his death Althusius remained a controversial thinker. His Politica was attacked by Henning Arnisaeus and Hugo Grotius during the 17th century for its defense of local autonomies against the rise of territorial absolutism and proponents of the modern united nation state. Interest in Althusius' theories continued into the second half of the 17th century, but Althusius was forgotten once the European wars of religion had ended.

Althusius had published in Latin using fashionable Ramist logic. As time passed, his political canon was read less and the barriers to interpreting Althusian politics increased. In the second half of the 19th century Althusius was rediscovered when Otto von Gierke published research on Politica. In Germany, an academic society was founded to research Althusius and his times. At a time when Otto von Bismarck worked towards unifying Germany Gierke promoted Althusius' preoccupation with political order based on majority decisions, traditional European relationships, and negotiated agreements as a timely theory on procedural federalism. In 1871 most German states unified to form the German Empire under Bismarck's imperial constitution. Gierke's book on Althusian federalism went on to become a source of inspiration for pluralism in Britain, with John Neville Figgis and Harold Laski adapting Gierke.

In 1932 the German–American professor Carl Joachim Friedrich published a new, slightly abridged edition of Althusius' Politica. After World War II Friedrich helped to draft the German constitution, the Basic Law for the Federal Republic of Germany, while working as adviser in Allied-occupied Germany. Friedrich praised Althusius for having written the first "full-bodied concept of federalism" and so generated renewed interest in Althusius on both sides of the Atlantic. In 1964 Frederick Smith Carney published an abridged English translation of Politica, exposing Althusius to a wider readership. In 1968 Althusisus was credited as "the real father of modern federalism" by Daniel J. Elazar.

== Althusian federalism ==
Johannes Althusius saw confederations as feasible and successful cooperative constitutional orders. In his view, a confederation could be built on successive levels of political community where each community pursues common interests. A village was a union of families, a town was a union of guilds, a province was a union of towns, a state was a union of provinces, and an empire was a union of states. Althusius' understanding of society as a community of communities informed his views on the nature of politics and federalism (consociatio symbiotica). For Althusius the purpose of politics was the "science of those matters which pertain to the living together" and federations perfectly put the purpose of politics into practice. Althusius's federalism did not involve the surrendering of power, instead it rested on responsibly sharing power.

Althusius became one of the principal European thinkers on federalism at the start of the 17th century while the European continent was ravaged by religious wars. Against the backdrop of the Reformation and the rise of absolutist monarchies, Althusius identified the German Holy Roman Empire as a commonwealth where the majority could decide matters for all. In reference to Aristotle, Althusius examined the confederate institutions of the Holy Roman Empire and established a theory of federalism where power is shared among autonomous smaller and larger political communities. In 1603 Althusius published Politica Methodice Digesta, setting out his theory on building a federal political system out of political associations that were grounded in the free initiative of citizens.

Althusius relied on the neo-Platonian idea of a universal brotherhood, thus he combined the Greco-Roman ideal of an association that was governed by reciprocal relationships with the Catholic Christian principle of subsidiarity. Althusius' teachings presented an alternative to the theories of his contemporary Jean Bodin on sovereignty. According to Althusus, natural law gave citizens the right to resist tyrannical government and sovereignty rested with the community, not the ruler. Therefore Althusius maintained that legitimate political authority was founded on smaller communities.

== Major works ==
- Civilis conversationis libri duo, 1601
- Politica, the first edition of which was completed in 1603, is considered not only the most fully developed scheme of Calvinist political theory, but also the only systematic justification of the Dutch Revolt. Althusius took from thinkers in various fields, including Aristotle, Calvin, Bodin, Machiavelli, Grotius, and Peter Ramus; Politica cited close to 200 books in all; the first edition of Politica was received with wide acclaim in Emden and in the Netherlands beyond. It may have been influential on American via Alexander Henderson.
- Dicaeologica libri tres, totum et universum Jus, Frankfurt, 1618. Sections of this work have been translated into English and published by Christian's Library Press as On Law and Power (2013).

== Selected Bibliography ==
=== Primary Works ===
- Althusius, Johannes (1586). Iuris romanis libri duo. Ad leges Methodi Rameae conformati (in Latin). Basilea – via Google Books.
- Politica Methodice digesta et exemplis sacris et profanis illustrata: Cui in fine adjuncta est Oratio panegyrica de utilitate, necessitate et antiquitate scholarum (in Latin). Herbornae Nassoviorum. 1603.
- Althusius, Johannes (2009). La politica: elaborata organicamente con metodo, e illustrata con esempi sacri e profani. Tomo II (in Latin). Claudiana. ISBN 978-88-7016-767-2. Republished Latin version of the complete Politica. The first part (Tomo I) is an Italian translation.
- Dicaelogicae Libri Tres: Totum et universum Jus, quo utimur Methodicé complectentes (in Latin). Herbornae Nassoviorum. 1617.
- De civilis Conversationis Libri Duo: Methodicé digesti et exemplis sacris et profanis passim illustrati (in Latin). Hanoviae (Hanau). 1601.

=== Translations of Works ===
==== Full Translations ====
- Althusius, Johannes (2009). La politica: elaborata organicamente con metodo, e illustrata con esempi sacri e profani. Tomo I (in Italian). Translated by Ingravalle, Francesco; Povero, Mauro; Malandrino, Corrado. Claudiana. ISBN 978-88-7016-767-2. Introduction by Corrado Malandrino.
- Althusius, Johannes (2023). La politique méthodiquement ordonnée et illustrée par des exemples sacrés et profanes (in French). Translated by Demelemestre, Gaëlle. Droz. ISBN 978-2-6000-6412-5.

==== Abridged or Partial Translations (German, English, Spanish) ====
- Althusius, Johannes (1964). The Politics of Johannes Althusius. Boston: Eyre & Spottiswoode. Also issued London, 1965. Abridged English translation of Politica; translated by Frederick Smith Carney with a preface by Carl J. Friedrich.
- Althusius, Johannes (1995). Politica Johannes Althusius. An Abridged Translation of Politics Methodically Set Forth and Illustrated with Sacred and Profane Examples. Indianapolis: Liberty Fund. ISBN 978-0-86597-115-8. Abridged English translation of Politica (trans. Frederick S. Carney; preface by Daniel J. Elazar).
- Althusius, Johannes (2013). On Law and Power. Translated by Veenstra, Jeffrey J. Abridged English translation of Dicaeologica libri tres (1617/1618). Christian's Library Press (CLP). ISBN 978-1-938948-59-6.
- Althusius, Johannes (1932). Politica Methodice Digesta of Johannes Althusius (Althaus) (in Latin). Based on the third edition (1614), includes preface from the first edition (1603) and 21 previously unpublished letters; with an extensive introduction by Carl Joachim Friedrich (Abridged edition). Cambridge: Harvard University Press.
- Janssen, Heinrich; Wyduckel, Dieter (2003). Johannes Althusius Politik (in German). Berlin: Duncker & Humblot. ISBN 3-428-11159-1. Abridged German translation of Politica; includes an Althusius biography and literature survey.
- Wolf, Erik (1948). "Politica methodice digesta 1603". Grundbegriffe der Politik (in German). Frankfurt am Main: V. Klostermann. Shorter German translation of Politica.
- Althusius, Johannes (1990). La política: metódicamente concebida e ilustrada con ejemplos sagrados y profanos (in Spanish). Translated by Mariño, Primitivo; Truyol y Serra, Antonio. Madrid: Centro de Estudios Constitucionales. ISBN 84-259-0860-4. Spanish translation (1990), based on the 1932 abridged Latin edition, with introduction and critical remarks by Primitivo Mariño and presentation by Antonio Truyol y Serra.

=== Commentaries ===
- Gierke, Otto von (1880). Johannes Althusius und die Entwicklung der naturrechtlichen Staatstheorien: zugleich ein Beitrag zur Geschichte der Rechtssystematik (in German). Breslau: Verlag von Wilhelm Koebner. (First published in the series Untersuchungen zur deutschen Staats- und Rechtsgeschichte, Heft VII; subsequently reprinted.)
- Gierke, Otto von (1939). The Development of Political Theory. Translated by Freyd, Bernard. New York: Howard Fertig. English translation of Gierke's German work.
- Kossmann, E. (1958). "Bodin, Althusius en Parker, of: Over de moderniteit van de Nederlandse opstand". In Brummel, L.; Kronenberg, M. E.; de la Fontaine Verwey, H.; Reedijk, C. (eds.). Opstellen door vrienden en collega's aangeboden aan F.K.H. Kossmann: ter gelegenheid van zijn vijf en zestigste verjaardag en van zijn afscheid als Bibliothecaris der Gemeente Rotterdam (in Dutch). s-Gravenhage: Nijhoff. pp. 79–86.
- Scheuner, Ulrich; Scupin, Hans Ulrich; Wyduckel, Dieter (1973). Althusius-Bibliographie: Bibliographie zur politischen Ideengeschichte und Staatslehre, zum Staatsrecht und zur Verfassungsgeschichte des 16. bis 18. Jahrhunderts (in German). Berlin: Duncker & Humblot. ISBN 978-3-428-02971-6. Two-volume bibliography on Althusius.
- Miller, David, ed. (1987). "Althusius, Johannes". The Blackwell Encyclopaedia of Political Thought. Oxford: Blackwell. pp. 9–10. ISBN 0-631-14011-5.
- Bayle, Pierre; Gottsched, Johann Christoph; Beyreuther, Erich (1997). Historisches und Critisches Wörterbuch, A–B (in German). Hildesheim: Olms. p. 169. ISBN 3487047918.
- Lakoff, Sanford (2001). "Althusius, Johannes". In Lipset, Seymour Martin (ed.). Political Philosophy: Theories, Thinkers, and Concepts. Washington, D.C.: CQ Press. pp. 221–223. ISBN 1-56802-688-9.
- Wyduckel, Dieter (2004). "Althusius, Johannes (1563–1638)". In Hillerbrand, Hans J. (ed.). Encyclopedia of Protestantism. Vol. 1. New York: Routledge. pp. 51–53. ISBN 0415924723.
- Hueglin, Thomas (2006). Early Modern Concepts for a Late Modern World: Althusius on Community and Federalism. Waterloo: Wilfrid Laurier University Press. ISBN 978-0-88920-767-7.
- Alvarado, Ruben (2018). The Debate that Changed the West: Grotius versus Althusius: Including Abridgements of the Politica methodice digesta and De iure belli ac pacis. Aalten, Netherlands: Pantocrator Press. ISBN 978-90-76660-51-6.

=== Poetry ===
- Peter, Johann (2005). Consomme Althusius: Gedichte für Herborn (in German). Illustrated by Anke Eißmann (1 ed.). Frankfurt: Nomos. ISBN 3-980-9981-3-4.

=== Research Literature ===
==== In English ====
- Perry, Stanley Joseph (1953). The Political Science of Johannes Althusius (PhD thesis). New Haven: Yale University.
- Carney, Frederick S. (1960). The Associational Theory of Johannes Althusius (PhD thesis). Chicago: University of Chicago.
- Drejer, Bert (2023). Liberty and Popular Sovereignty: Johannes Althusius (1563–1638) and Humanist Political Thought (PhD thesis). Florence: European University Institute. doi:10.2870/0535. hdl:1814/75506.
- Ruokanen, Jukka (2025). The Political Theory of Johannes Althusius from a Social‑Ontological Perspective: A Philosophical Analysis of the Existence of Social Life, Communities, and the Commonwealth (PhD thesis). Jyväskylä: University of Jyväskylä. ISBN 978-952-86-0618-5.

==== In German ====
- Antholz, Heinz Wernet (1954). Die politische Wirksamkeit des Johannes Althusius in Emden (PhD thesis) (in German). Köln: Universität Köln.
- Rebstein, Ernst (1955). Johannes Althusius als Fortsetzer der Schule von Salamanca: Untersuchungen zur Ideengeschichte des Rechtsstaates und zur altprotestantischen Naturrechtslehre (PhD thesis) (in German). Freiburg: Universität Freiburg.
- Gierke, Julius von (1957). Neues über Johannes Althusius (in German). Berlin: Carl Heymanns.
- Feuerherdt, Eckhard (1962). Gesellschaftsvertrag und Naturrecht in der Staatslehre des Johannes Althusius (PhD thesis) (in German). Köln: Universität Köln.
- Winters, Peter Jochen (1963). Die "Politik" des Johannes Althusius und ihre zeitgenössischen Quellen: zur Grundlegung der politischen Wissenschaft im 16. und im beginnenden 17. Jahrhundert (PhD thesis) (in German). Freiburg im Breisgau: Rombach.
- Friedrich, Carl J. (1975). Johannes Althusius und sein Werk im Rahmen der Entwicklung der Theorie von der Politik (in German). Berlin: Duncker & Humblot.
- Wyduckel, Dieter (1979). Princeps legibus solutus: Eine Untersuchung zur frühmodernen Rechts- und Staatslehre (in German). Berlin: Duncker & Humblot. ISBN 3-428-04413-4.
- Holzhauer, Heinz (1991). "Johannes Althusius". In Holzhauer, Heinz; Toellner, Richard (eds.). Symposion 400 Jahre Hohe Schule Steinfurt (in German). Steinfurt: Stadt Steinfurt. pp. 146–157. Conference proceedings (18–19 September 1988), Steinfurter Schriften, 17.
- Janssen, Heinrich (1992). Die Bibel als Grundlage der politischen Theorie des Johannes Althusius (PhD thesis) (in German). Frankfurt am Main: Lang. ISBN 3-631-44147-9.
- Blickle, Peter; Hüglin, Thomas O.; Wyduckel, Dieter (2002). Subsidiarität als rechtliches und politisches Ordnungsprinzip in Kirche, Staat und Gesellschaft (in German). Berlin: Duncker & Humblot. ISBN 3-428-10634-2.
- Carney, Frederick S.; Schilling, Heinz; Wyduckel, Dieter (2004). Jurisprudenz, Politische Theorie und Politische Theologie: Beiträge des Herborner Symposions zum 400. Jahrestag der Politica des Johannes Althusius 1603–2003 (in German). Berlin: Duncker & Humblot. ISBN 3-428-11554-6. Volume 131 of Beiträge zur politischen Wissenschaft. Conference proceedings.
- Koch, Bettina (2005). Zur Dis-/Kontinuität mittelalterlichen politischen Denkens in der neuzeitlichen politischen Theorie: Marsilius von Padua, Johannes Althusius und Thomas Hobbes im Vergleich (PhD thesis) (in German). Berlin: Duncker & Humblot. ISBN 3-428-11609-7.
- Hohberger, Stefan (2008). Vergleich der politischen Theorie und der politischen Systeme des Althusius mit der EU (PhD thesis) (in German). Berlin: Duncker & Humblot. ISBN 978-3-428-12592-0.
- Malandrino, Corrado; Wyduckel, Dieter (2010). Politisch-rechtliches Lexikon der »Politica« des Johannes Althusius (in German). Berlin: Duncker & Humblot. ISBN 978-3-428-12975-1.
- Knöll, Philip A. (2011). Staat und Kommunikation in der Politik des Johannes Althusius: Untersuchungen zur Politikwissenschaft in der frühen Neuzeit (PhD thesis) (in German). Augsburg: Augsburg University. ISBN 978-3-428-13539-4.
- de Wall, Heinrich (2014). Reformierte Staatslehre in der frühen Neuzeit (in German). Berlin: Duncker & Humblot. ISBN 978-3-428-54238-3. Conference proceedings of the Johannes‑Althusius‑Gesellschaft.
- Simon, Florian (2019). Assoziation und Institution als soziale Lebensformen in der zeitgenössischen Rechtstheorie (in German). Berlin: Duncker & Humblot. ISBN 978-3-428-10334-8.

==== In French ====
- Demelemestre, Gaëlle (2009). Les métamorphoses du concept de souveraineté (XVIe–XVIIIe siècles) (PDF) (PhD thesis) (in French). Paris: Université Paris. NNT: 2009PEST1008, HAL Id: tel-00503799.
- Demelemestre, Gaëlle (2011). Les deux souverainetés et leur destin. Le tournant Bodin‑Althusius. La Nuit surveillée (in French). Paris: Les Éditions du Cerf. ISBN 978-2-204-09517-4.
- Demelemestre, Gaëlle (2012). Introduction à la « Politica methodice digesta de Johannes Althusius ». Humanités (in French). Paris: Les Éditions du Cerf. ISBN 978-2-204-09783-3.

==== In Italian ====
- Bianchin, Lucia (1998). Il concetto di sovranità nella « Politica Methodice digesta » di Johannes Althusius (Master's thesis) (in Italian). Trento: Università di Trento.

==== In Korean ====
- 조원홍 (Cho, Won-hong) (1992). Johannes Althusius의 國家論과 法理論 硏究 (PhD thesis) (in Korean). Seoul: Seoul National University. — [A Study of Johannes Althusius' Theory of State and Law]. Includes a German summary "Ein Studium Über die Staats- und Rechtslehre des Johannes Althusius" (pp. 189–191).

== Sources ==
- Althusius, Johannes (2013). On Law and Power. Translated by Veenstra, Jeffrey J. Christian's Library Press (CLP). ISBN 978-1-938948-59-6. (Abridged translation from Latin of Dicaeologicae libri tres, 1617/1618.)
- Grabill, Stephen J. (2013). "Althusius in Context: A Biographical and Historical Introduction". On Law and Power. CLP Academic (Christian's Library Press). pp. xix–xlvii. ISBN 978-1-938948-59-6.
- Witte Jr., John (2013). "A Demonstrative Theory of Natural Law: Johannes Althusius and the Rise of Calvinist Jurisprudence". On Law and Power. CLP Academic (Christian's Library Press). pp. xlix–lxxiii. ISBN 978-1-938948-59-6.
- Alvarado, Ruben (2018). The Debate that Changed the West: Grotius versus Althusius. Aalten: Pantocrator Press. ISBN 978-90-76660-51-6.
- Ingravalle, Francesco; Malandrino, Corrado, eds. (2005). Il lessico della «Politica» di Johannes Althusius. L'arte della simbiosi santa, giusta, vantaggiosa e felice. Studi e testi (Fondazione Luigi Firpo) (in Italian). Vol. 26. Prefazione di Dieter Wyduckel; introduzione di Corrado Malandrino. Firenze: Olschki. ISBN 978-88-222-5473-3.
- Føllesdal, Andreas (June 1998). "Survey Article: Subsidiarity". Journal of Political Philosophy. 6 (2): 190–218. doi:10.1111/1467-9760.00052.
- Friedrich, Carl J. Constitutional Reason of State. Providence: Brown University Press, 1957.
- Hueglin, Thomas. "Covenant and Federalism in the Politics of Althusius." In The Covenant Connection: From Federal Theology to Modern Federalism, ed. Daniel J. Elazar and John Kincaid, 31–54. Lanham, Maryland: Lexington Books, 2000.
- Hueglin, Thomas. Early Modern Concepts for a Late Modern World: Althusius on Community and Federalism. Waterloo, Ont.: Wilfrid Laurier University Press, 1999.
- ________. "Federalism at the Crossroads: Old Meanings, New Significance." Canadian Journal of Political Science 36 (June 2003): 275–293.
- ________. "Have We Studied the Wrong Authors? On Johannes Althusius as a Political Theorist." Studies in Political Thought 1 (Winter 1992): 75–93.
- Kistenkas, Frederik Hendrik (2000). "European and domestic subsidiarity: An Althusian conceptionalist view". Tilburg Law Review. 8 (3): 247–254. doi:10.1163/221125900X00044.
- Lakoff, Sanford. "Althusius, Johannes." In Political Philosophy: Theories, Thinkers, and Concepts. Edited by Seymour Martin Lipset, 221–223. Washington, D.C.: CQ Press, 2001.
- von Gierke, Otto. The Development of Political Theory. Translated by Bernard Freyd. New York: W. W. Norton and Company, Inc., 1939.
