= Ramism =

Theories based on the teachings of Petrus Ramus

Part of the series on
Modern scholasticism
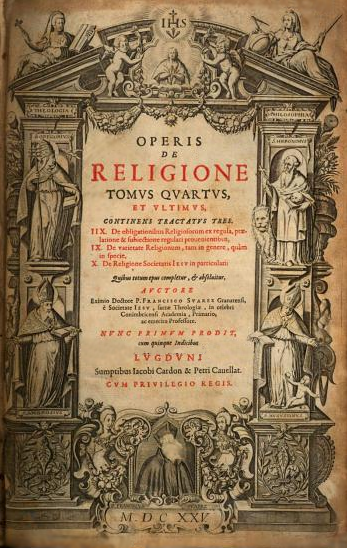
Title page of the Operis de religione (1625) from Francisco Suárez
Background

Protestant Reformation
Counter-Reformation
Aristotelianism
Scholasticism
Patristics

Modern scholastics

Second scholasticism of the School of Salamanca
Lutheran scholasticism during Lutheran orthodoxy
Ramism among the Reformed orthodoxy
Metaphysical poets in the Church of England

Reactions within Christianity

Jesuits against Jansenism
Labadists against the Jesuits
Pietism against orthodox Lutherans
Nadere Reformatie within Dutch Calvinism
Richard Hooker against the Ramists

Reactions within philosophy

Neologists against Lutherans
Spinozists against Dutch Calvinists
Deists against Anglicanism
John Locke against Bishop Stillingfleet

Ramism was a collection of theories on rhetoric, logic, and pedagogy based on the teachings of Petrus Ramus, a French academic, philosopher, and Huguenot convert, who was murdered during the St. Bartholomew's Day massacre in August 1572.

According to British historian Jonathan Israel:

[Ramism], despite its crudity, enjoyed vast popularity in late sixteenth-century Europe, and at the outset of the seventeenth, providing as it did a method of systematizing all branches of knowledge, emphasizing the relevance of theory to practical applications [...]

== Development ==
Ramus was a cleric and professor of philosophy who gained notoriety first by his criticism of Aristotle and then by conversion to Protestantism. He was killed in the St Bartholomew's Day Massacre of 1572, and a biography by Banosius (Théophile de Banos) appeared by 1576. His status as Huguenot martyr certainly had something to do with the early dissemination of his ideas. His ideas had influence in some (but not all) parts of Protestant Europe, strong in Germany and the Netherlands, and on Puritan and Calvinist theologians of England, Scotland, and in the American colonies of New England, via Puritan colonists on the Mayflower.

He had little effect however on mainstream Swiss Calvinists, and was largely ignored in Catholic countries. The progress of Ramism in the half-century from roughly 1575 to 1625 was closely related to, and mediated by, university education: the religious factor came in through the different reception in Protestant and Catholic universities, all over Europe.

Outside France, for example, there was the 1574 English translation by the Scot Roland MacIlmaine of the University of St Andrews. Ramus's works and influence then appeared in the logic textbooks of the Scottish universities, and equally he had followers in England.

Audomarus Talaeus (Omer Talon) was one early French disciple and writer on Ramism. The work of Ramus gained early international attention, with Roger Ascham corresponding about him with Johann Sturm, teacher of Ramus and collaborator with Ascham; Ascham supported his stance on Joachim Perion, one early opponent, but also expressed some reservations. Later Ascham found Ramus' lack of respect for Cicero, rather than extreme proponents, just unacceptable.

As late as 1626, Francis Burgersdyk divides the logicians of his day into the Aristotelians, the Ramists and the Semi-Ramists. These last endeavoured, like Rudolph Goclenius of Marburg and Amandus Polanus of Basel, to mediate between the contending parties. Ramism was closely linked to systematic Calvinism, but the hybrid Philippo-Ramism (which is where the Semi-Ramists fit in) arose as a blend of Ramus with the logic of Philipp Melanchthon.

== Opposition ==
Ramism, while in fashion, met with considerable hostility. The Jesuits were completely opposed. The Calvinist Aristotelian Theodore Beza was also a strong opponent of Ramism. Similarly the leading Lutheran Aristotelian philosopher Jakob Schegk resolutely rejected Ramus and opposed his visit to Tübingen. In Heidelberg the efforts of Giulio Pace to teach Ramist dialectic to Polish private students were forbidden.

Where universities were open to Ramist teaching, there still could be dislike and negative reactions, stemming from the perceived personality of Ramus (arrogant, a natural polemicist), or of that of his supporters (young men in a hurry). There was tacit adoption of some of the techniques such as the epitome, without acceptance of the whole package of reform including junking Aristotle in favour of the new textbooks, and making Ramus an authoritative figure. John Rainolds at Oxford was an example of an older academic torn by the issue; his follower Richard Hooker was firmly against "Ramystry".

Gerhard Johann Vossius at Leiden wrote massive works on classical rhetoric and opposed Ramism. He defended and enriched the Aristotelian tradition for the seventeenth century. He was a representative Dutch opponent; Ramism did not take permanent hold in the universities of the Netherlands, and once William Ames had died, it declined.

Mid-century, Ramism was still under attack, from Cartesians such as Johannes Clauberg, who defended Aristotle against Ramus.

== Placing Ramism ==
Frances Yates proposed a subtle relationship of Ramism to the legacy of Lullism, the art of memory, and Renaissance hermetism. She considers that Ramism drew on Lullism, but is more superficial; was opposed to the classical art of memory; and moved in an opposite direction to the occult (reducing rather than increasing the role of images). He "abandoned imagery and the creative imagination". Mary Carruthers referred back to Albertus Magnus and Thomas Aquinas:

"It is one of those ironies of history that Peter Ramus, who, in the sixteenth century, thought he was reacting against Aristotelianism by taking memoria from rhetoric and making it part of dialectic, was essentially remaking a move made 300 years before by two Dominican professors who were attempting to reshape memorial study in conformity with Aristotle."

An alternative to this aspect of Ramism, as belated and diminishing, is the discussion initiated by Walter Ong of Ramus in relation to several evolutionary steps. Ong's position, on the importance of Ramus as historical figure and humanist, has been summed up as the center of controversies about method (both in teaching and in scientific discovery) and about rhetoric and logic and their role in communication.

The best known of Ong's theses is Ramus the post-Gutenberg writer, in other words the calibration of the indexing and schematics involved in Ramism to the transition away from written manuscripts, and the spoken word. Extensive charts were instead used, drawing on the resources of typography, to organise material, from left to right across a printed page, particularly in theological treatises. The cultural impact of Ramism depended on the nexus of printing (trees regularly laid out with braces) and rhetoric, forceful and persuasive at least to some Protestants; and it had partly been anticipated in cataloguing and indexing knowledge and its encyclopedism by Conrad Gesner. The term Ramean tree became standard in logic books, applying to the classical Porphyrian tree, or any binary tree, without clear distinction between the underlying structure and the way of displaying it; now scholars use the clearer term Ramist epitome to signify the structure. Ong argued that, a chart being a visual aid and logic having come down to charts, the role of voice and dialogue is placed squarely and rigidly in the domain of rhetoric, and in a lower position.

Two other theses of Ong on Ramism are: the end of copia or profuseness for its own sake in writing, making Ramus an opponent of the Erasmus of Copia: Foundations of the Abundant Style; and the beginning of the later Cartesian emphasis on clarity. Ong, though, consistently argues that Ramus is thin, insubstantial as a scholar, a beneficiary of fashion supported by the new medium of printing, as well as a transitional figure.

These ideas, from the 1950s and 1960s onwards, have been reconsidered. Brian Vickers summed up the view a generation or so later: dismissive of Yates, he notes that bracketed tables existed in older manuscripts, and states that Ong's emphases are found unconvincing. Further, methodus, the Ramists' major slogan, was specific to figures of speech, deriving from Hermogenes of Tarsus via George of Trebizond. And the particular moves used by Ramus in the reconfiguration of rhetoric were in no sense innovative by themselves. Lisa Jardine agrees with Ong that he was not a first-rank innovator, more of a successful textbook writer adapting earlier insights centred on topics-logic, but insists on his importance and influence in humanistic logic. She takes the Ramean tree to be a "voguish" pedagogic advance.

It has been said that:

Puritans believed the maps proved well suited to rationalize and order the Christian view of revealed truth and the language and knowledge of the new learning, specifically the scientific and philosophical paradigms arising out of the Renaissance.

== Disciplines and demarcations ==
Donald R. Kelley writes of the "new learning" (nova doctrina) or opposition in Paris to traditional scholasticism as a "trivial revolution", i.e. growing out of specialist teachers of the trivium. He argues that:

The aim was a fundamental change of priorities, the transformation of hierarchy of disciplines into a 'circle' of learning, an 'encyclopedia' embracing human culture in all of its richness and concreteness and organized for persuasive transmission to society as a whole. This was the rationale of the Ramist method, which accordingly emphasized mnemonics and pedagogical technique at the expense of discovery and the advancement of learning.

The need for demarcation was seen in "redundancies and overlapping categories".

This was taken to the lengths where it could be mocked in the Port-Royal Logic (1662). There, the authors claimed that "everything that is useful to logic belongs to it", with a swipe at the "torments" the Ramists put themselves through.

The method of demarcation was applied within the trivium, made up of grammar, logic (for which Ramists usually preferred a traditional name, dialectic), and rhetoric. Logic falls, according to Ramus, into two parts: invention (treating of the notion and definition) and judgment (comprising the judgment proper, syllogism and method). In this he was influenced by Rodolphus Agricola. What Ramus does here in fact redefines rhetoric. There is a new configuration, with logic and rhetoric each having two parts: rhetoric was to cover elocutio (mainly figures of speech) and pronuntiatio (oratorical delivery). In general, Ramism liked to deal with binary trees as method for organising knowledge.

Rhetoric, traditionally, had had five parts, of which inventio (invention) was the first. Two others were dispositio (arrangement) and memoria (memory). Ramus proposed transferring those back to the realm of dialectic (logic); and merging them under a new heading, renaming them as iudicium (judgment). This was the final effect: as an intermediate memoria was left with rhetoric.

== Laws and method ==
In the end the art of memory was diminished in Ramism, displaced by an idea of "method": better mental organisation would be more methodical, and mnemonic techniques drop away. This was a step in the direction of Descartes. The construction of disciplines, for Ramus, was subject to some laws, his methodus. There were three, with clear origins in Aristotle, and his Posterior Analytics.

They comprised the lex veritatis (French du tout, law of truth), lex justitiae (par soi, law of justice), and lex sapientiae (universalité, or law of wisdom). The third was in the terms of Ramus "universel premièrement", or to make the universal the first instance. The "wisdom" is therefore to start with the universal, and set up a ramifying binary tree by subdivision.

As Ramism evolved, these characteristic binary trees, set up rigidly, were treated differently in various fields. In theology, for example, this procedure was turned on its head, since the search for God, the universal, would appear as the goal rather than the starting point.

Émile Bréhier wrote that after Ramus, "order" as a criterion of the methodical had become commonplace; Descartes needed only to supply to method the idea of relation, exemplified by the idea of a mathematical sequence based on a functional relationship of an element to its successor. Therefore, for Cartesians, the Ramist insights were quite easily absorbed.

For the Baconian method, on the other hand, the rigidity of Ramist distinctions was a serious criticism. Francis Bacon, a Cambridge graduate, was early aware of Ramism, but the near-equation of dispositio with method was unsatisfactory, for Baconians, because arrangement of material was seen to be inadequate for research. The Novum Organum implied in its title a further reform of Aristotle, and its aphorism viii of Book I made this exact point.

== At Cambridge ==
A Ramist tradition took root in Christ's College, Cambridge in the 1570s, when Laurence Chaderton became the leading Ramist, and Gabriel Harvey lectured on the rhetoric of Ramus. Marshall McLuhan's dissertation on Thomas Nashe (via the classical trivium), who was involved in a high-profile literary quarrel with Harvey, was shaped by his interest in aligning Harvey with dialectic and the plain style (logic in the sense of Ramus), and Nashe with the full resources of Elizabethan rhetoric. After Chaderton, there was a succession of important theologians using Ramist logic, including William Perkins, and William Ames (Amesius), who made Ramist dialectic integral to his approach.

William Temple annotated a 1584 reprint of the Dialectics in Cambridge. Known as an advocate of Ramism, and involved in controversy with Everard Digby of Oxford, he became secretary to Sir Philip Sidney about a year later, in 1585. Temple was with Sidney when he died in 1586, and wrote a Latin Ramist commentary on An Apology for Poetry. Sidney himself is supposed to have learned Ramist theory from John Dee, and was the dedicatee of the biography by Banosius, but was not in any strict sense a Ramist.

This Ramist school was influential:

The Ramist system was introduced into Cambridge University by Sir William Temple, in 1580, and contributed to the growth of Cambridge Platonism. It became the basis of Congregational apologetics. The Cambridge Puritans were represented by Alexander Richardson, George Downame, Anthony Wotton, and especially by William Ames, whose writings became the favorite philosophy texts of early New England. In 1672, the same year in which Ames's edition of Ramus's Dialectics with Commentary appeared, Milton published his Institutions of the Art of Logic Based on the Method of Peter Ramus. Other Puritan divines who popularized the Ramist philosophy and Covenant Theology were William Perkins, John Preston, and Thomas Hooker.

Christopher Marlowe encountered Ramist thought as a student at Cambridge (B.A. in 1584), and made Peter Ramus a character in The Massacre at Paris. He also cited Ramus in Dr. Faustus: Bene disserere est finis logices is a line given to Faustus, who states it is from Aristotle, when it is from the Dialecticae of Ramus.

There is a short treatise by John Milton, who was a student at Christ's from 1625, published two years before his death, called Artis Logicae Plenior Institutio ad Petri Rami Methodum concinnata. It was one of the last commentaries on Ramist logic. Although composed in the 1640s, it was not published until 1672. Milton, whose first tutor at Christ's William Chappell used Ramist method, can take little enough credit for the content. Most of the text proper is adapted from the 1572 edition of Ramus's logic; most of the commentary is adapted from George Downham's Commentarii in P. Rami Dialecticam (1601)—Downham, also affiliated with Christ's, was a professor of logic at Cambridge. The biography of Ramus is a cut-down version of that of Johann Thomas Freigius (1543–83).

== At Herborn ==
Herborn Academy in Germany was founded in 1584, as a Protestant university, and initially was associated with a group of Reformed theologians who developed covenant theology. It was also a centre of Ramism, and in particular of its encyclopedic form. In turn, it was the birthplace of pansophism. Heinrich Alsted taught there, and John Amos Comenius studied with him.

Ramism was built into the curriculum, with the professors required to give Ramist treatments of the trivium. Johannes Piscator anticipated the foundation in writing introductory Ramist texts, Johannes Althusius and Lazarus Schöner likewise wrote respectively on social science topics and mathematics, and Piscator later produced a Ramist theology text.

== In literature ==
Brian Vickers argues that the Ramist influence did add something to rhetoric: it concentrated more on the remaining aspect of elocutio or effective use of language, and emphasised the role of vernacular European languages (rather than Latin). The outcome was that rhetoric was applied in literature.

In 1588 Abraham Fraunce, a protégé of Philip Sidney, published Arcadian Rhetorike, a Ramist-style rhetoric book cut down largely to a discussion of figures of speech (in prose and verse), and referring by its title to Sidney's Arcadia. It was based on a translation of Talon's Rhetoricae, and was a companion to The Lawiers Logike of 1585, an adapted translation of the Dialecticae of Ramus. Through it, Sidney's usage of figures was disseminated as the Ramist "Arcadian rhetoric" of standard English literary components and ornaments, before the source Arcadia had been published. It quickly lent itself to floridity of style. William Wimsatt and Cleanth Brooks consider that the Ramist reform at least created a tension between the ornamented and the plain style (of preachers and scientific scholars), into the seventeenth century, and contributed to the emergence of the latter. With the previous work of Dudley Fenner (1584), and the later book of Charles Butler (1598), Ramist rhetoric in Elizabethan England accepts the reduction to elocutio and pronuntiatio, puts all the emphasis on the former, and reduces its scope to the trope.

Geoffrey Hill classified Robert Burton's Anatomy of Melancholy (1621) as a "post-Ramist anatomy". It is a work (he says against Ong) of a rooted scholar with a "method" but turning Ramism back on itself.

== Ramists ==
=== Danish ===
- Andreas Krag

=== Dutch ===
- Jacobus Arminius
- Isaac Beeckman, Rudolf Snellius, Willebrord Snellius
- Justus Lipsius, wrote his Politicorum sive Civilis doctrinae on a strict Ramist scheme.

=== Scottish ===
- Roland MacIlmaine (University of St Andrews) published The Logike of the Moste Excellent Philosopher P. Ramus, Martyr, and a Latin edition of this work in 1574.
- James Martin has been classified as a Ramist he was a writer against Aristotle, but the classification is disputed.
- Andrew Melville

=== English ===
- William Ames (1576–1633)
- John Barton (c. 1605-1675)
- Nathaniel Baxter
- Charles Butler
- George Downame
- Dudley Fenner
- Henry Finch, jurist, attempted in Nomotexnia to arrange common law along Ramist lines
- William Gouge
- Thomas Granger
- William Perkins (1558–1602)
- John Rainolds
- Alexander Richardson
- John Udall

=== French ===
- Guy de Brues
- Pierre Gassendi in writing on logic.

=== German ===
- Johann Heinrich Alsted, "the culmination of the Ramist tradition", but also a critic of naive Ramism
- Johannes Althusius organised his Politics in accordance with Ramist logic
- Bartholomäus Keckermann, constructed a modified Ramist logic.
- Johannes Piscator
- Caspar Schoppe

=== Hungarian ===
- János Apáczai Csere, encyclopedist.

=== Swedish ===
- Paulinus Gothus.

=== Swiss ===
- Johannes Wolleb

=== Welsh ===
- Henry Perri.

== Bibliography ==
- J. C. Adams, "Ramus, Illustrations, and the Puritan Movement," Journal of Medieval and Renaissance Studies, vol. 17, 1987, pp. 195–210
- N. Bruyere, Méthode et dialectique dans l'oeuvre de La Ramée, Paris: Vrin 1984
- N. Bruyere-Robinet, "Le statut de l'invention dans l'oeuvre de La Ramée," Revue des sciences philosophiques et theologiques, vol. 70, 1986, pp. 15–24
- S. J. G. Burton, Ramism and the Reformation of Method: The Franciscan Legacy in Early Modernity, USA: Oxford UP, 2023
- M. Feingold, J. S. Freedman, and W. Rother (editors), The Influence of Petrus Ramus: Studies in Sixteenth and Seventeenth Century Philosophy and Sciences, Basel, Schwabe & Co., 2001
- J. S. Freedman, "The Diffusion of the Writings of Petrus Ramus in Central Europe, c.1570–c.1630," Renaissance Quarterly, vol. 46, 1993, pp. 98–152
- F. P. Graves, Peter Ramus and the Educational Reformation of the Sixteenth Century, New York: Macmillan, 1912.*Howard Hotson, Commonplace Learning: Ramism and its German Ramifications, 1543–1630 (2007)
- H. Hotson, Commonplace Learning: Ramism and Its German Ramifications, 1543–1630, New York: Oxford University Press, 2007
- W. S. Howell, Logic and Rhetoric in England, 1500–1700, Princeton: Princeton UP, 1956.
- R. Kennedy and T. Knoles, "Increase Mather's 'Catechismus Logicus': A Translation and an Analysis of the Role of a Ramist Catechism at Harvard," Proceedings of the American Antiquarian Society, vol. 109, no. 1, 2001, pp. 183–223
- K. Meerhoff and J. Moisan, eds. Autour de Ramus: Texte, Theorie, Commentaire, Quebec: Nuit Blanche, 1997
- K. Meerhoff, Rhétorique et Poétique au XVle siècle en France, Leiden: Brill 1986, pp. 175–330
- J. J. Murphy, ed., Peter Ramus's Attack on Cicero: Text and Translation of Ramus's Brutinae Quaestiones, Davis, C. A.: Hermagoras Press, 1992
- W. J. Ong, A Ramus and Talon Inventory, Cambridge, MA: Harvard UP, 1958
- W. J. Ong, Ramus, Method and the Decay of Dialogue, Cambridge, MA: Harvard UP, 1958
- W. J. Ong, Introduction to Peter Ramus's Scholae in liberales artes, Hildesheim: Olms, 1970
- W. J. Ong, Introduction to Peter Ramus's Collectaneae praefationes, epistolae, orationes, Hildesheim: Olms, 1969
- S. J. Reid and E. A. Wilson (eds.), Ramus, Pedagogy and the Liberal Arts: Ramism in Britain and the Wider World, Burlington: Ashgate, 2011
- P. Sharratt, "The Present State of Studies on Ramus," Studi Francesi, vol. 47/48, 1972, pp. 201–203
- ———— (1987), "Recent Works on Peter Ramus (1970–1986)", Rhetorica, 5 (1): 7–58, doi:10.1525/rh.1987.5.1.7.
- ———— (1983), "The First French Logic", Mélanges a la mémoire de Franco Simone [Varieties in memory of Franco Simone], vol. IV, Geneva: Slatkine, pp. 205–19
- ———— (1976), "Peter Ramus and the Reform of the University", French Renaissance Studies, 1540–1570, Edinburgh: Edinburgh UP: 4–20.
- ———— (2000), "Ramus 2000", Rhetorica, 18 (4): 399–455, doi:10.1525/rh.2000.18.4.399, S2CID 257484517.
- ———— (1991), "Ramus", Argumentation, 5 (4): 335–446, doi:10.1007/BF00129135, S2CID 144442800
