= Herborn, Hesse =

Herborn
- Town
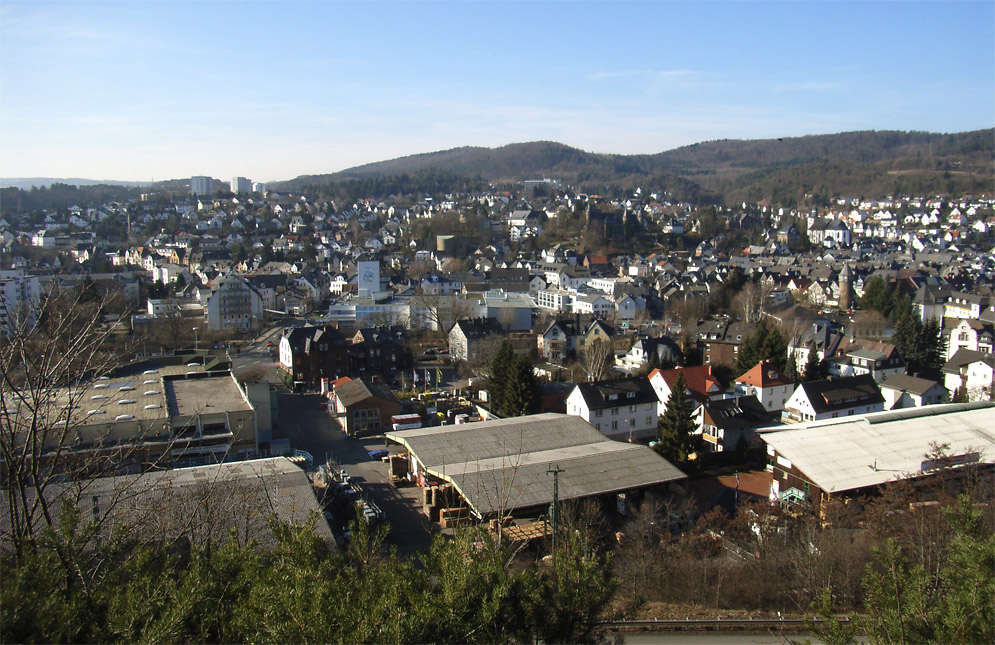
- A view of Herborn from the east

- Flag Coat of arms

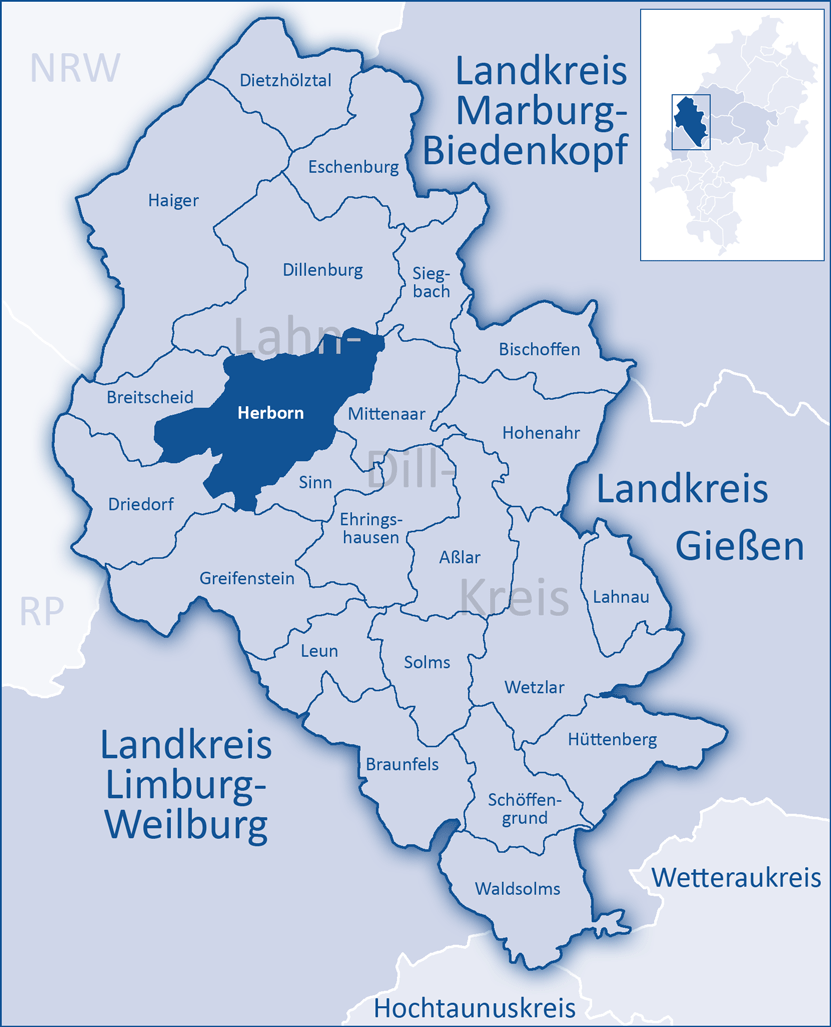
- Location of Herborn within Lahn-Dill-Kreis district
- Interactive map of Herborn
- Location within Germany Location within Hesse
- Coordinates: 50°40′57″N 8°18′22″E
- Country: Germany
- State: Hesse
- Admin. region: Gießen
- District: Lahn-Dill-Kreis

Government
  - Mayor (2019–25): Katja Gronau

Area
  - Total: 63.76 km^{2} (24.62 sq mi)
- Elevation: 287 m (942 ft)

Population (2025-12-31)
  - Total: 20,276
  - Density: 318.0/km^{2} (823.6/sq mi)
- Time zone: UTC+01:00 (CET)
  - Summer (DST): UTC+02:00 (CEST)
- Postal codes: 35745
- Dialling codes: 02772, 02777 (Schönbach)
- Vehicle registration: LDK, DIL, WZ
- Website: www.herborn.de

Herborn (German pronunciation: [ˈhɛʁbɔʁn]) is a historic town on the Dill in the Lahn-Dill district of Hesse in Germany. Before World War I, it was granted its own title as Nassauisches Rothenburg. The symbol or mascot of this town is a bear. Scenic attractions include its half-timbered houses; Herborn is located on the German Timber-Frame Road. Herborn hosted the 26th Hessentag state festival in 1986, and the 56th Hessentag in 2016.

== Geography ==
The town's coordinates are 50°41′4″N 8°18′15″E. It has an area of 64 km^{2} (25 sq mi), of which 28 km^{2} (11 sq mi) is forest. Herborn is connected by the A45 motorway (E40/E41) with Siegen, Wetzlar, and Gießen.

=== Neighbouring communities ===
Herborn is bordered on the north by the town of Dillenburg, on the northeast by the community of Siegbach, on the east by the community of Mittenaar, on the southeast by the community of Sinn, on the south by the community of Greifenstein, and on the west by the communities of Driedorf and Breitscheid (all in the Lahn-Dill-Kreis).

=== Constituent communities ===
Herborn is divided into the communities of Amdorf, Burg, Guntersdorf, Hirschberg, Hörbach, Merkenbach, Schönbach, Seelbach and Uckersdorf as well as the main town of Herborn.

=== Population ===
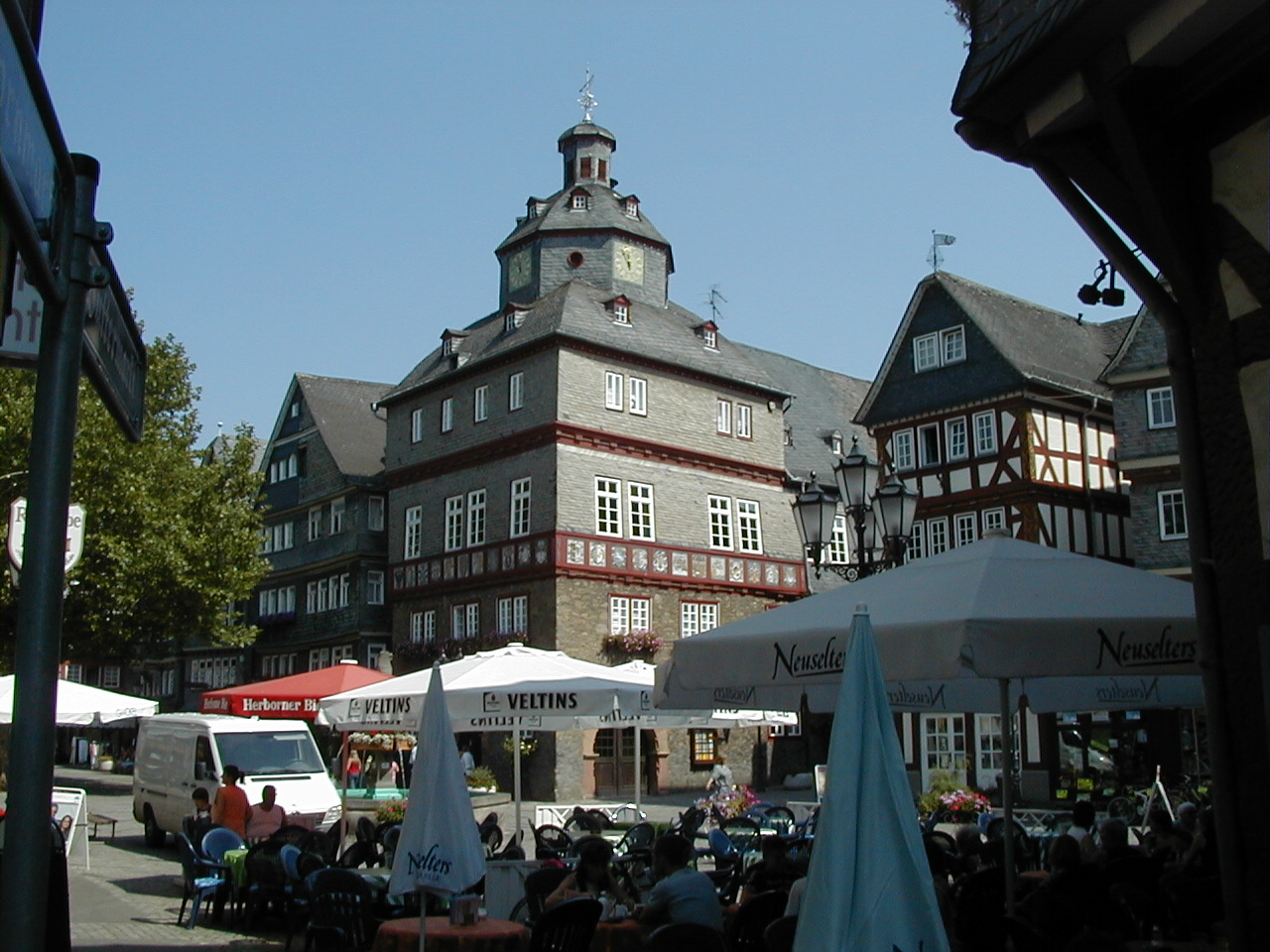
The town hall (Rathaus) of Herborn, seen in 2003.

(in each case on 31 December)

- 1998 - 21,334
- 1999 - 21,415
- 2000 - 21,380
- 2001 - 21,254
- 2002 - 21,304
- 2003 - 21,214
- 2004 - 21,158
- 2005 - 21,260
- 2006 - 20,810
- 2007 - 20,921
- 2008 - 20,962
- 2009 - 20,975

== History ==
Herborn had its first documentary mention in 1048, and was granted the privilege of a city in 1251 by the Counts of Nassau.

In 1584 the Herborn Academy, a Reformed (Calvinistic) institution, was founded by John VI of Nassau-Dillenburg, younger brother of William the Silent and namesake of today's Gymnasium Johanneum.

Herborn was where Johannes Piscator published the Reformed Church translation of the Bible into German, in 1602. This work has had a decisive effect in shaping church life among followers of the Reformed movement in Germany, the Netherlands, Switzerland and the United States. It was printed in Herborn in the akademische Druckerei von Corvinus, known today as the Corvinsche Druckerei or Paul's Hof, after the Paul family who own it.

In 1626, the town lost 214 houses in a fire started by accident in soldiers' quarters. Soon after, Herborn and the surrounding area were the scene of a number of witch trials.

Towards the end of the Thirty Years' War, the townsfolk were looking after 50 Swedish soldiers, which brought them protection by the Swedish Army, and thereby also a reputation as a "field hospital town" ("Lazarettstadt") that lasted until the end of the Second World War.

After the Congress of Vienna Herborn was in a border area next to Prussia, and its economy suffered due to import tariffs. Hesse-Nassau joined the Zollverein (Customs Union) only in 1836, and in 1866 it was completely annexed by Prussia.

In the Second World War, Herborn was mostly spared by the bombers, but its Jewish community was obliterated in 1942, and many of the patients of the psychiatric clinic were deported and murdered.

During much of the Cold War there was a small American military garrison in the community, district Seelbach.

The town became nationally known for a truck disaster that happened on 7 July 1987. After losing control because of faulty brakes, a tanker truck carrying about 34 000 L of fuel ran into a house containing an ice cream parlour and a pizzeria. The escaping fuel flowed into the sewers and exploded, setting several houses on fire. All together, six people lost their lives, and 40 were injured.

== Politics ==
=== Town council ===
The municipal elections on 26 March 2006 yielded the following results:

CDU	14 seats
SPD	14 seats
FWG	3 seats
FDP	2 seats
Greens	3 seats
WASG	1 seat

Note: FWG is a citizens' coalition.

== Twin towns – sister cities ==
Herborn is twinned with:

- Pertuis, France (1965)
- Guntersdorf, Austria (1970)
- Schönbach, Austria (1996)
- Iława, Poland (1998)
- Post Falls, United States

== Culture and sightseeing ==
=== Museums ===
- Museum Herborn in der Hohen Schule (Herborn Museum in the "High School")
- Heimatmuseum Herborn-Seelbach (local history)
- Heimat- und Industriemuseum Burg (local history and industry)
- Heimatstube Hörbach (local history)

=== Buildings ===
==== Town hall ====
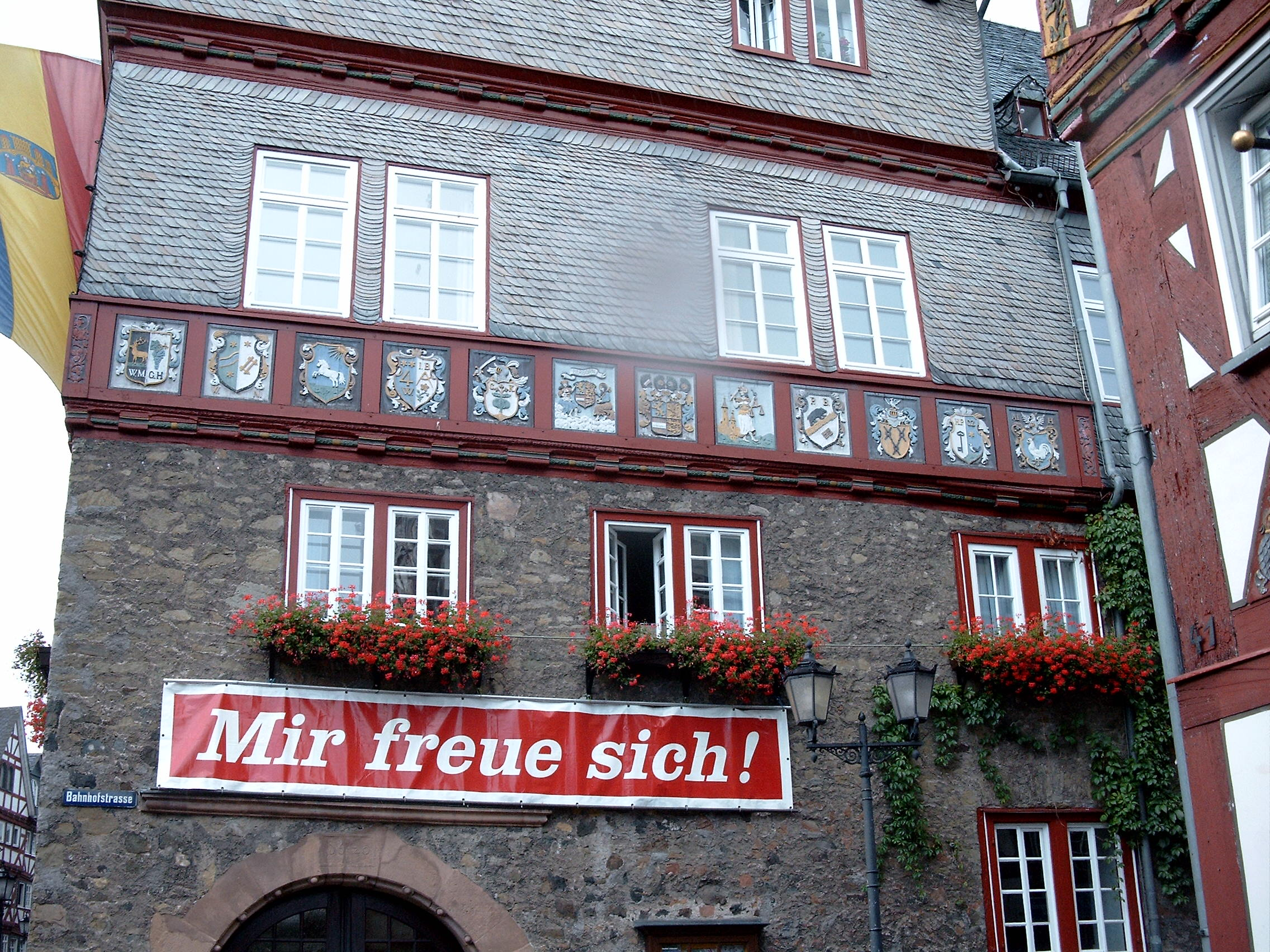
Town hall with arms frieze

This was built in the 16th century and built anew after a fire in the 17th century. Particularly worthy of note is the frieze around the building showing local family coats of arms.

==== Other buildings ====
- Evangelical historic town church dating back to at least 1219, even earlier, with many interesting building styles and features like a gothic choir with net-vault, romanic window, renaissance style in the main nave etc.
- Many half-timbered houses dating from the 15th (oldest house: built in 1445) to 18th century.
- Market fountain from 1730
- Paulshof the printing works from Corvin
- The "High School" (with the local history museum) founded 1584, remodelled in 1645
- Town wall with many preserved towers (Dill Tower, Speck Tower, Witch Tower, Burgher Tower, Hain Tower and Leonhards Tower) and gates like the Stone Gate (oldest entrance of the town dating back to the city privileges of 1251)
- Herborn Castle, the stately home (Schloss, inhabited castle).

=== Parks ===
The constituent community of Uckersdorf has a widely known attraction with its bird park. You find more information on the web-site

http://www.vogelpark-herborn.de

=== Natural monuments ===
The Old Town is not the only attraction in Herborn. The surrounding countryside features the low mountains of the Westerwald range.

=== Regular events ===
- Sommerfest (summer festival), last Saturday each July
- Rock in the city park (Saturday before Whitsun)
- Martinimarkt (market), November
- Ponyfest in Herborn/Schönbach (May/June)
- Strawberry Sunday (first Sunday in July)
- wine festival (Friday to Sunday, first weekend every July)

=== Holiday roads ===
Herborn lies on the Deutsche Fachwerkstraße, featuring many places with many half-timbered houses, and on the Solmser Straße, a scenic road leading through many historic and artistically important places in Hesse.

== Infrastructure ==
=== Transport ===
Herborn is served today by two railway stations and four more have been abandoned.

Herborn station was opened in 1862 on the Dill Railway. The current station building dates from 1908 and was designed by the church architect Ludwig Hoffmann. In the past the station was served by two other lines:

- services on the Aar-Salzböde railway from Niederwalgern started and ended here from 1902 to 2001,
- services on the Westerwaldquer Railway to Montabaur started and ended here from 1906 to 1980.

The station is served by Regional-Express trains on the Siegen–Gießen–Frankfurt route (Main-Sieg-Express, RE 40) and Stadt-Express services on the Dillenburg-Frankfurt route (Mittelhessen-Express, SE 40, running as stopping trains between Dillenburg and Gießen).

Burg (Dillkr) station was located on the Aar-Salzböde railway (Niederwalgern–Herborn) and had three platform tracks.

Burg (Dillkr) Nord station is the other station still in operation and is also located on the Dill Railway and is classified by Deutsche Bahn (DB) as a category 6 station. It is only served by the Mittelhessen-Express.

The three stations of Burg (Dillkr) West, Uckersdorf and Amdorf were located on the Cross Westerwald Railway are now closed.

== Notable people ==
- Nicolaus Ferber (1485–1534), Franciscan and controversialist
- Wilhelm Heun (1895–1986), WWII general
- Harald Weyel (born 1959), AfD politician, Bundestag member
- Paul Pöpperl (born 2003), professional footballer
