= Johannes Piscator =

German theologian (1546–1625)

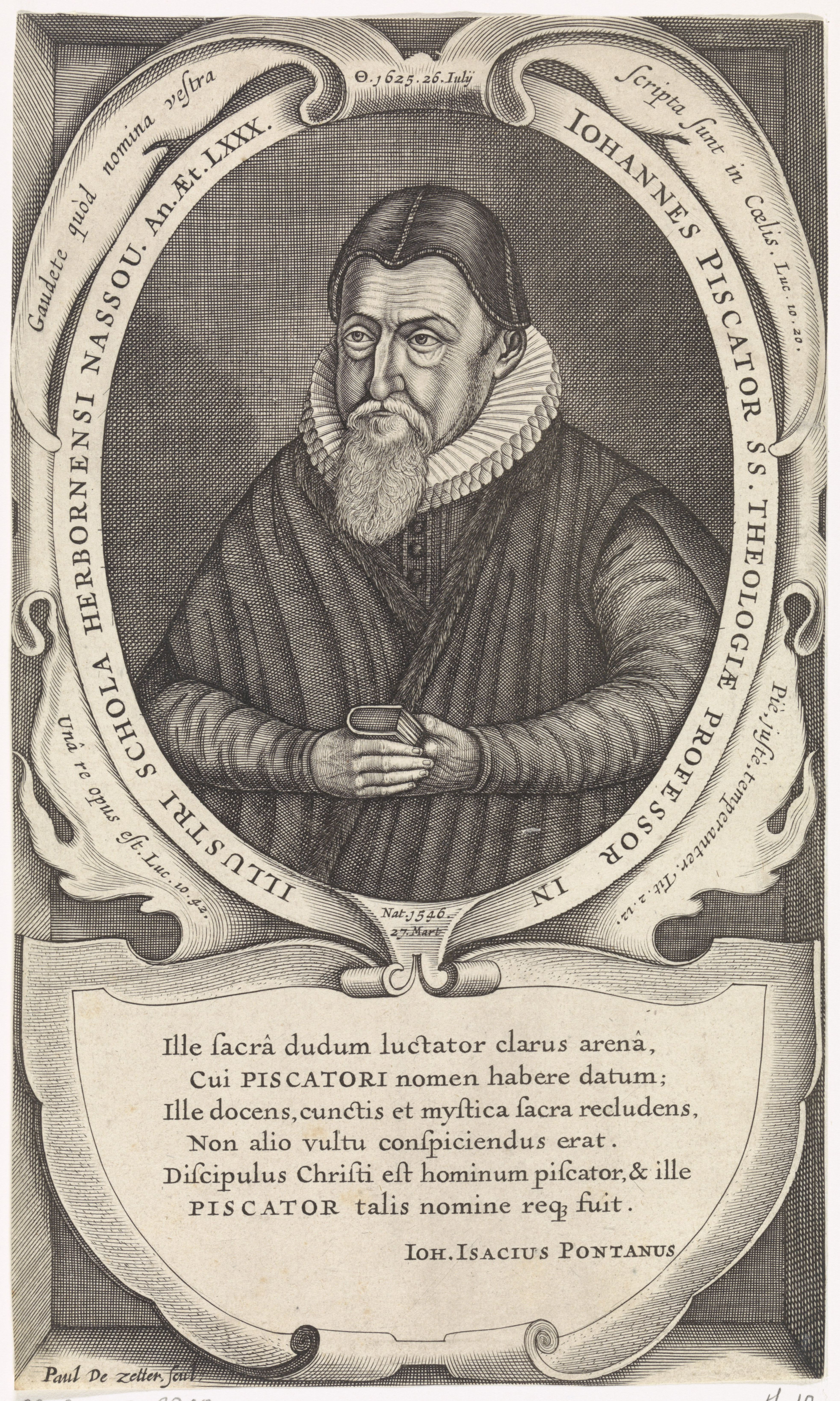

Johannes Piscator (/pɪˈskeɪtər, ˈpɪskə-/; German: Johannes Fischer; 27 March 1546 – 26 July 1625) was a German Reformed theologian, known as a Bible translator and textbook writer.

He was a prolific writer, and initially moved around as he held a number of positions. Some scholarly confusion as to whether there was more than one person of the name was addressed in a paper by Walter Ong.

== Life ==
Piscator was born at Strasbourg, and educated at the University of Tübingen. He became professor of theology at Strasbourg in 1573. Elector Frederick III experienced some resistance when he attempted to appoint him to the arts faculty at the University of Heidelberg in 1574, and Piscator eventually took a post at the preparatory Latin Paedagogium in Heidelberg.

After a confessional change in Heidelberg, he briefly served as deputy rector at the court school in Dillenburg in 1577 before being appointed professor of theology at the Casimirianum in Neustadt in 1578. He later served as rector at Moers in 1581 before settling into a productive career as professor at the Herborn Academy, from 1584 to 1625, where he was able to advance his Ramist pedagogy fully. He died at Herborn.

== Works ==
Piscator prepared Latin commentaries collectively of the New Testament (Herborn, 1595–1609) and the Old Testament (1612, 1618), and a German translation of the Bible (1605–19). He followed with Anhang des herbonischen biblischen Wercks (1610), noted for its wealth of archeological, historical, and theological material.

He left a multitude of text-books in philosophy, philology, and theology, of which Aphorismi doctrinæ christianæ (1596) was much used.

In 2010 Piscator's Appendix to his Commentary on Exodus 21 - 23 has been translated and published under the title of Disputations on the Judicial Laws of Moses.

== Theologian ==
His significance for theology was his opposition to the doctrine of the active obedience of Christ. "Whoever denies that Christ was subject to the law, denies that he was man." If the imputation of the active obedience were sufficient man would be free from obedience as well as from the curse.
