= Pansophism =

Educational system of universal knowledge

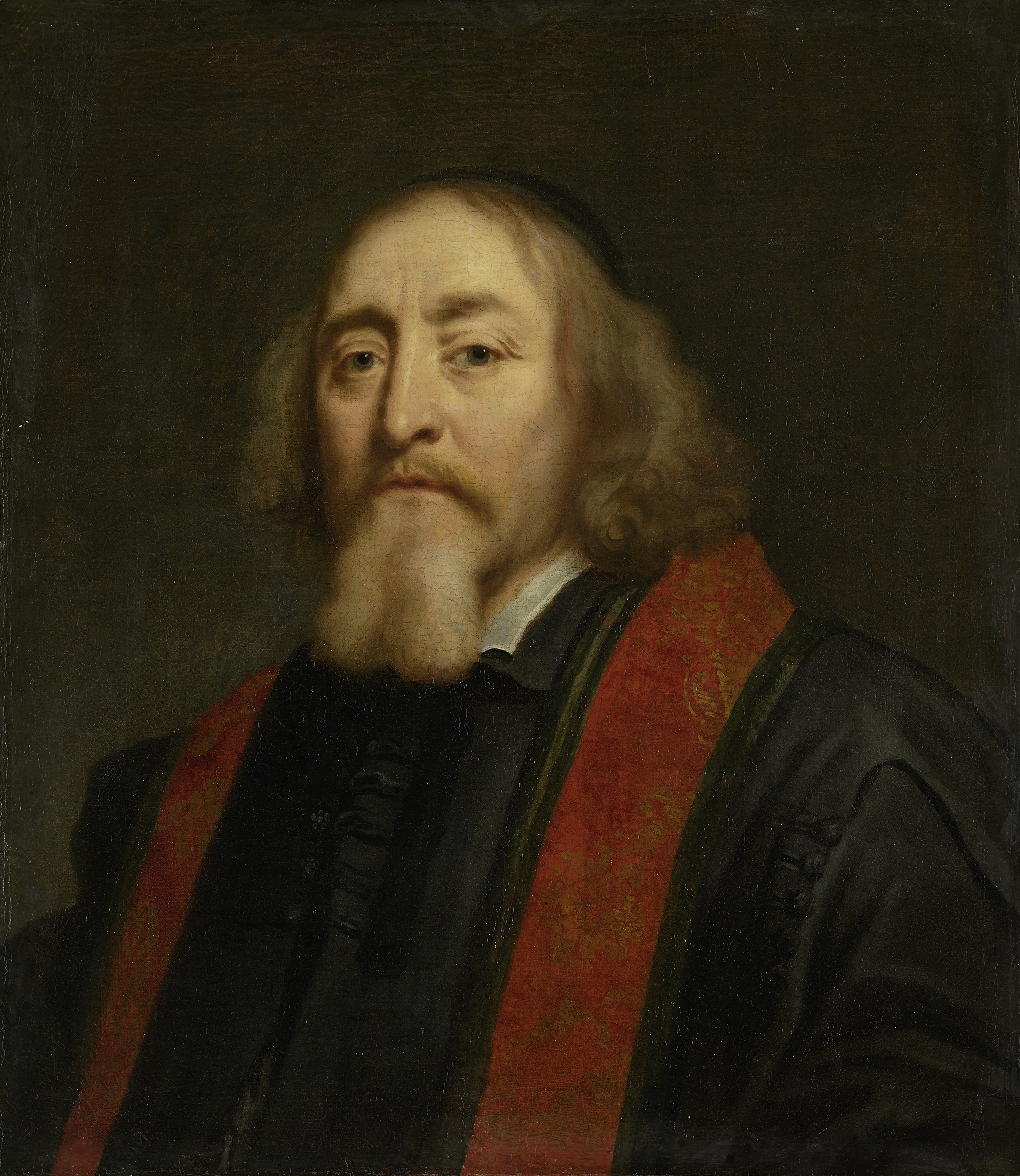
John Amos Comenius created the main concepts of Pansophism in the mid-1600s.

Pansophism (from Greek pansophos and English -ism,), also known as pansophy, is a pedagogical concept aimed to educate humanity to a complete understanding of everything. It was proposed by Czech philosopher John Amos Comenius in the mid-1600s.

"[Comenius's] second great interest was in furthering the Baconian attempt at the organization of all human knowledge. He became one of the leaders in the encyclopædic or pansophic movement of the seventeenth century".

== Etymology ==
The word pansophism comes from the Greek words pansophos plus the suffix -ism.

The word pansophy comes from the Neo-Latin word pansophia, derived from the Greek words πᾶν (pan) 'all' and σοφία (sophia) 'wisdom'.

The term was not originally created by Comenius, having been applied by Bartolomeo Barbaro of Padua in his De omni scibili libri quadraginta: seu Prodromus pansophiae, from the middle of the sixteenth century.

== Conceptions of pansophism ==
=== General conception ===
The pansophic principle is one of the important principles of Comenius: that everything must be taught to everyone, or in his words "to all men and from all points of view" (Great Didactic), as a guiding basis for education. This continues the idea of universal education (characteristica universalis). According to Comenius, pansophism

propoundeth to itself so to expand and lay open to the eyes of all the wholeness of things that everything might be pleasurable in itself and necessary for the expanding of the appetite.

The early concepts of pansophism included:

- Open schools for all
- Support for impoverished children
- Mixed gender classes
- Investment in schoolbooks
- Text and pictures in books
- Gradual complexity
- Lifelong learning

Pansophism was a term used generally by Comenius to describe his pedagogical philosophy. His book Pansophiae prodromus (1639) was published in London with the cooperation of Samuel Hartlib. It was followed by Pansophiae diatyposis. Pansophy in this sense has been defined as ‘full adult comprehension of the divine order of things’. He aimed to set up a Pansophic College, a precursor of later academic institutes He wrote his ideas for this in a tract Via lucis, written 1641/2 in London; he had to leave because the English Civil War was breaking out, and this work was eventually printed in 1668, in Amsterdam.

== History ==
=== Educational reform ===
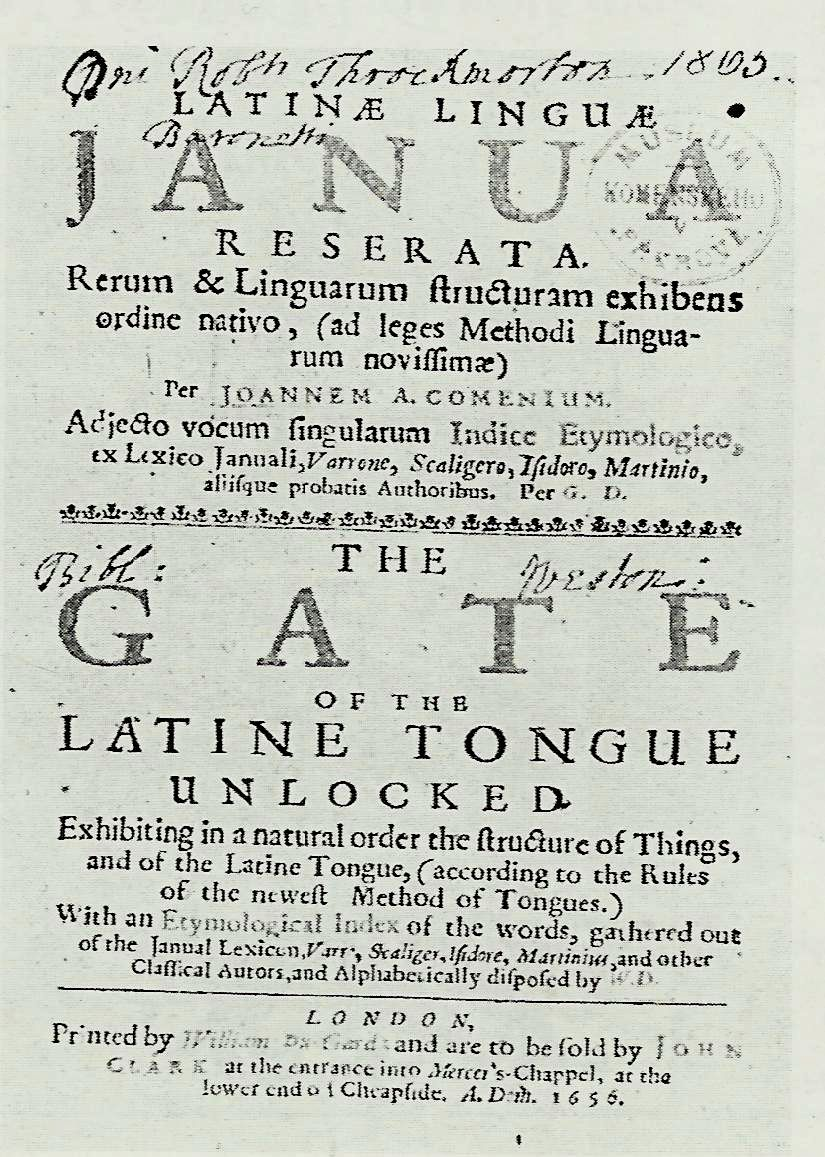
Janua Linguarum Reserata.

Believing that the Protestants would win and liberate Bohemia from the Habsburg Counter-Reformation, John Amos Comenius, then a minister, wrote a "Brief Proposal" advocating for full-time schooling for the youth of Bohemia and maintaining that they should be taught both their native culture and the culture of Europe whilst hiding in Leźno in 1628 with the Bohemian Brethren during the Thirty Years' War. Comenius wrote three books during this time: The Great Didactic, which focused on a reform on the education system, The School of Infancy, a book for mothers on the early years of childhood, and Janua Linguarum Reserata in 1629, which was then published in 1631. After being translated to German, the Janua became famous in Europe and was subsequently translated into a number of European and Asian languages. Comenius wrote that he was "encouraged beyond expectation" from the reception of the Janua.

In 1638, Comenius responded to a request by the government of Sweden and traveled there to draw up a scheme for the management of the country's schools and by writing a series of textbooks modeled on the Janua. Comenius interpreted the request as the Swedish government entitling him to base the textbooks on a system of pansophism, which he saw as an evolved form as philosophy.

Pansophism at the time was not influential during Comenius' lifetime or afterward.

=== Later esoteric reinterpretations ===
==== The Pansophic Lodges ====
In the early 1920s, Heinrich Tränker, a German occultist, founded multiple "Pansophic lodges" to promote his Rosicrucian interpretation of pansophism in Germany. They were intended as esoteric societies combining elements of Rosicrucianism, western esotericism, and mysticism. One of the lodges was located out of Berlin from 1924 to 1926 and was called the Pansophische Loge der lichtsuchenden Brüder Orient Berlin (English: Pansophic lodge of the light-seeking brethren Orient Berlin), which was founded and led by Eugen Grosche. The lodges generally studied gnosis, Kabbalah, philosophy, and mysticism in an attempt to cultivate pansophism. The Pansophische Gesellschaft was succeeded by the Fraternitas Saturni in 1926 due to the closing of the lodges and Grosche's dissatisfaction with the lack of guidance from Tränker on the lodges.

==== Pansophers.com ====
Pansophers.com is an online Rosicrucian blog created in 2015. According to the website, they claim to be the only non-denominational Rosicrucian blog.

==== Pansophic Freemasonry ====
A group within Freemasonry is called Pansophic Freemasonry.

== See also ==
- Free education
