= Daniel Strejc-Vetterus =

Czech priest (1592–1669)

Daniel Strejc Czech pronunciation: [strɛjts] (Autumn of 1592 – probably 1669) was a Czech priest of the Unity of the Brethren. He is known for the travelogue Islandia, about the journey to Iceland in 1613, first published in 1638. Strejc was also known under surnames Vetter or Vetterus.

Strejc was born in Autumn 1592, probably in Hranice na Moravě as the fourth son of Jiří Strejc, a writer, translator of religious texts and organizer of Unity of the Brethren in Židlochovice in southern Moravia. Young Strejc first studied in Herborn, later at the gymnasium in Bremen and then theology at the University of Heidelberg. In Heidelberg, in 1620, he became a Czech tutor for the oldest son of Elector Palatine Frederick V (shortly reigning as the Czech king). Later, Strejc studied at the academy in Leiden. In 1632 he joined the exiled community of Unity of the Brethren in Leszno, Poland and in the same year became priest and administrator of Unity's printing-shop. In Leszno he married Kristina Poniatowska, foster-daughter of Commenius famous for ecstatic prophecies. The couple had two sons and three daughters. In 1655, during the Northern War, Leszno was burned down and the community destroyed. Strejc and the remains of the Unity moved to Brzeg (Břeh) in Silesia, the new centre for the exile.

Strejc-Vetterus was considered the next senior (the highest religious official within the Unity of the Brethren), succeeding Commenius but being too old he was only named consenior in 1663. The last mention about Strejc comes from a letter written by Commenius in 1669.

== Travel to Iceland ==
The reason the Unity of the Brethren sent Strejc, accompanied by Jan Salmon, to Iceland is unknown. Salmon, a priest and literate, was born in village Podboří (now part of Lipník nad Bečvou) and studied in Bremen together with Strejc.

Both travelers left Bremen on 16 May 1613, and 23 days later, on 7 June, the ship landed in the western part of Iceland, in Nesvogur bay under the hill Helgafell. Two days later they visited the site of the Althing north of lake Thingvallavatn. On the invitation of bishop Oddur Einarsson they rode to his seat in Skálholt and after four days moved to Bessastadir in the Hvalfjörður. A local official arranged them a place on a ship to Hamburg. Strejc and Salmon thus became the first Czechs who visited Iceland.

Strejc published the account of the journey 25 years later, in 1638 in Polish under the name Islandia, álbo Krotkie opisanie Wyspy Islandiy. Only a single original print has been preserved, in Ossolineum in Wrocław.

The Czech-language edition was published shortly thereafter but all the prints are lost now. Only a very imprecise hand written copy has been preserved, currently located in the National Museum in Prague. The copy has 85 pages (each with 16-23 lines) size 11,5 x 18,5 cm and title Islandia, aneb krátké vypsání ostrova Islandu, v němž věci divné a zvláštní, v krajinách těchto našich nevídané, očitě spatřeny a některé od obyvatelův ostrovu tohoto hodnověmých slyšány i pravdivě poznamenány (Islandia, or a short description of the island of Iceland, where are found things curious and peculiar, without precedent in this our own country, eye-witnessed and faithfully recorded from the trustworthy inhabitants of the island)

A German translation was published in 1640 (a print is preserved in Copenhagen). The second Czech edition was published in 1673. This print has 32 pages, size 8.5 x 14 cm and uses Schwabacher typeface.

These three known prints are independent versions compiled from the original diaries and supplemented with details from the contemporary literature about Iceland. Strejc used description by of Iceland by Dithmar Blefken (1607), work of David Fabricius (1616) based on Blefken's work and the map and description from the 1590 atlas Theatrum Orbis Terrarum by Abraham Ortelius which was based a map by Iceland bishop Gudbrand Thórlaksson.

First mention about Vetterus' Islandia comes from the 1652 work Systema historico-chronologicum, ecclesiarum Slavonicarum per provincias varias by Adrian Regenvolscius (pseudonym of Andreas Wengerscius, a rector of the school in Leszno); page 337 reads: Edidit descriptionem insulae Islandiae.... This work also contains biographical information about Vetterus. Josef Dobrovský, in a work from 1827, mentioned the 1673 Czech edition - this became the first documented reference about the book in Czech.

In 1858 Islandia was translated into Danish by Edvin M. Thorson under the title Kortfattet Beskrivelse af den Islandia ved Daniel Streyc (Vetterus); fra Polsk oversat med en Inlending. Geographer Thorvaldur Thoroddsen commented the book as mostly realistic.

Čeněk Zíbrt, a Czech publisher, reprinted the 1673 edition (with commentary and literary references about Strejc) in journal Světozor in 1893 (scanned pages: , , , , , , , , , , , , and ). All three original versions were published as a book, with a commentary and analysis, in 1931 by Bohuslav František Horák (1881–1960), a historical geography professor from the Brno University.
