= Comeniology =

Study of life, views, contribution and works of Jan Amos Comenius

Comeniology or Comenius studies (Czech: Komeniologie) is the academic discipline dedicated to the comprehensive study of the life, contributions, and educational philosophy of John Amos Comenius (1592–1670).

== See also ==
- Orbis Pictus
- Great Didactic
- School of Infancy
- Janua linguarum reserata
- Labyrinth of the World and Paradise of the Heart
