= Gate to Languages =

Gate to Languages (Czech: Brána jazyků, IPA: [ˈbraːna ˈjazɪkuː]) is a project of lifelong education of teachers, organized in the Czech Republic by National Institute for Further Education (NIFE) since 17 October 2005. It is aimed at the development of foreign language skills and methodological competence of Czech teachers. The name of the project was inspired by the book Janua linguarum reserata (Gate to Languages Unlocked) by Jan Amos Comenius.

NIFE organizes the methodology and language courses for three target groups of teachers at Czech elementary and secondary schools and higher education institutions:

- Teachers without specialized qualification for teaching a foreign language, who, despite this fact, teach or are going to teach the language. This group involves mostly elementary school teachers of English, German and French language who partly speak the language, but who were originally qualified in teaching different subjects. The course consists of 200 lessons and focuses on both teaching the participants the foreign language and provide them with some methodology training.
- Teachers qualified in teaching a foreign language. This group involves qualified teachers of the above-mentioned languages, who want to improve their methodological competence. The course consists of 30 lessons.
- Teachers of other subjects or non-teaching experts working at a school. In this group participants of the courses have a possibility to learn a foreign language, but the courses are not designed to present the methodology of its teaching. The course consists of 150 lessons.

7,173 teachers from the Czech Republic take part in the project, among them 6,340 in the English courses, 700 in the German courses and 133 in the French courses. 75 per cent of the expenses are financed from the European Structural Funds and the rest by the Czech Republic Ministry of Education, Youth and Sports. The courses for qualified language teachers were finished in June 2006, the whole project is planned to finish in the end of June 2007.
