= Janua Linguarum Reserata =

Book by Jan Amos Comenius

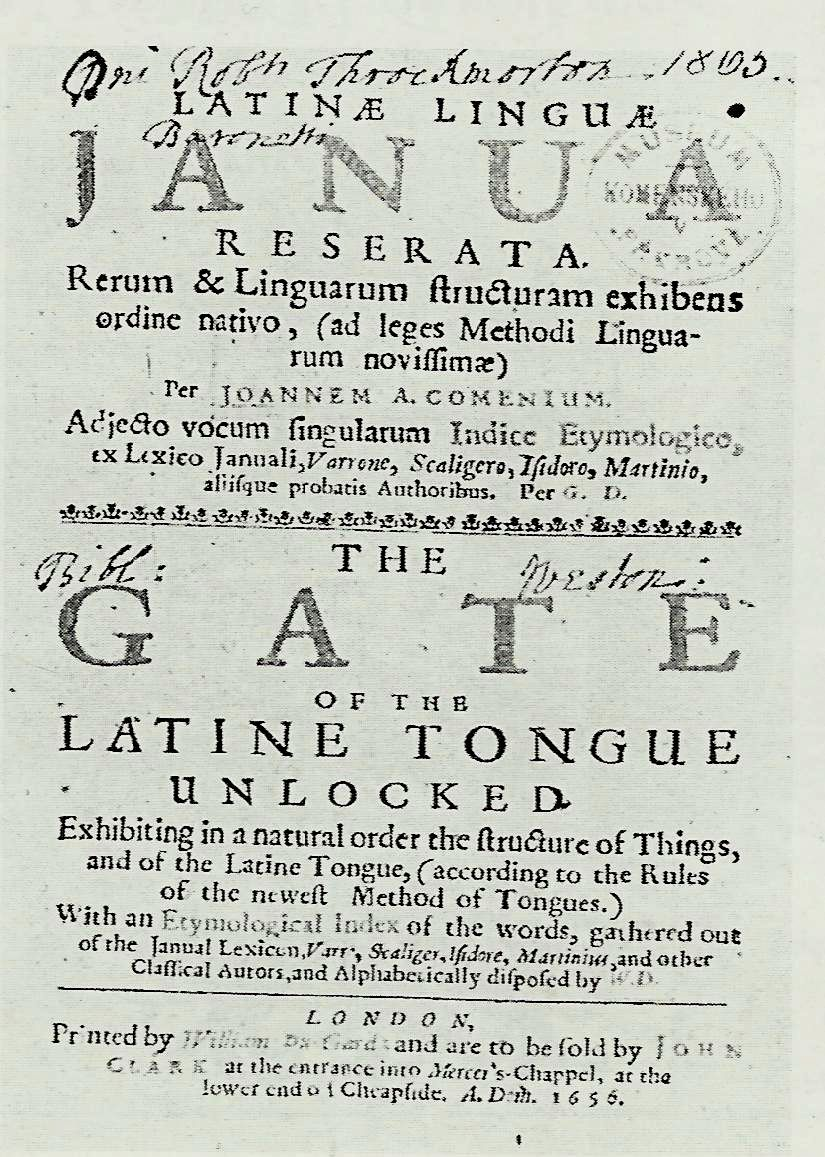
Title page of the 1656 English edition

Janua Linguarum Reserata (Latin for "The Door" or "Gate of Languages Unlocked") is a Latin textbook written by the Moravian pedagogue John Amos Comenius in 1629. It was published in 1631 in Leszno, Poland, and was soon translated into a number of European and several Asian languages.

== Background ==
In 1628, when the Habsburgs allowed only the Catholic religion in their monarchy, many Czech Brethren found exile in Leszno, in Catholic Poland, where Protestants were tolerated. Comenius formed the idea that language cannot be taught without relation to things. He also saw a narrow connection between language and knowledge, both of which he considered limited. His friends persuaded him to express these ideas in books, of which Janua Linguarum Reserata was the first. Comenius was inspired by a Latin–Spanish textbook called Janua Linguarum, published in Salamanca in 1611 by an Irish monk William Bathe (Latin: Bateus). The book was published in 1617 in London in four languages, the other two being English and French. This edition was probably shown to Comenius by John Jonston.

== Contents ==
The textbook consists of one thousand paragraphs, divided into one hundred chapters, each of which is a short sermon. Comenius discusses religious themes, nature, the human body, the human soul, crafts, housing, society, sciences, and behavior. These sermons were designed to use the most common vocabulary and grammatical features of Latin. The book uses about eight thousand words. Students were intended to the learn the Latin language by memorizing these sermons and their meaning.

== Publication history and variations ==
It was published under the full name Janua Linguarum Reserata sive Seminarium Linguarum et Scientiarum Omnium (Latin for "The Door of Languages Unlocked, or, The Seedbed of All the Languages and Sciences"). Approximately 8000 words are set in 1000 sentences which are divided into about 100 chapters. A simplified version of about 1000 words in 7 chapters for beginners was published under the name Vestibulum in 1932. The Janua was also adapted for the stage in 1953–54 and published in Sárospatak under the name Schola Ludus seu Encyclopaedia Viva. It is divided into eight plays and it takes place in Alexandria under Ptolemaeus Philadelphus. The main characters of the advisors from different ages are Plato, Eratosthenes, Apollonius of Rhodes, Plinius, and Socrates. The numbers of actors in the eight plays vary from 33 in the 6th up to 88 in the 3rd.

== Reception and translations ==
The new encyclopaedic and linguistic system brought fame to the book and its author so that he became name familiar to European scholars. Right after being published, the book was widely praised, re-published and translated so that it became the most widespread book in Europe of its time, except for the Bible. A Czech version was published by Comenius in Leszno in 1633 under the name Dveře jazyků otevřené. It was translated to 11 or 12 European languages: English (first anonymous "pirate" edition London 1631 by Johannes Anchoranus), Polish (Gdańsk 1633), German (Leipzig 1633), French (London 1633), Italian (Leiden 1640), Swedish (Stockholm 1641), Dutch (Amsterdam 1642), Greek (Amsterdam 1643), Hungarian (Bardejov 1643), Spanish (Amsterdam 1661), and Arabic (translated by Peter Golius, brother of Jacobus Golius, before 1642), and translations to other Asian languages (Turkish, Persian, Mongolian and Armenian) were prepared but no copy of them exists.

Comenius was surprised at the enthusiastic reception the book received. He wrote:

I could not have imagined ... that this childish book [would be] received with universal approbation by the learned world. This was shown me by the number of men who wished me hearty success with my new discovery and by the number of translations into foreign languages. For, not only was the book translated into twelve European languages, since I myself have seen these translations (Latin, Greek, Bohemian, Polish, German, Swedish, Dutch, English, French, Spanish, Italian, and Hungarian), but also into the Asiatic languages — Arabic, Turkish, and Persian — and even into the Mongolian, which is understood by all the East Indies.

There are 101 editions in Czech libraries published during Comenius's lifetime; 18 more editions were issued before the end of the 17th century. In the 18th century, interest weakened and it was published only ten times. In some editions it was called Janua Linguarum ... Aurea ("The Golden Door of Languages"); some others have Porta ("Door or Entrance") instead of Janua ("Door, Gate, or Entrance"). A simplified Januae Linguarum Reseratae Vestibulum was published more than 40 times during Comenius's life and translated to eight languages.

== See also ==
- Orbis Pictus
- Great Didactic
- Labyrinth of the World and Paradise of the Heart
