= Fraternitas Saturni =

German magical order founded in 1926

Symbol of the Fraternitas Saturni

Fraternitas Saturni (Latin: "Brotherhood of Saturn") is a German magical order, founded in 1926 by Eugen Grosche a.k.a. Gregor A. Gregorius and four others. It is one of the oldest continuously running magical groups in Germany. The lodge is, as Gregorius states, "concerned with the study of esotericism, mysticism, and magic in the cosmic sense". The FS adopts a system of degrees, ending with the 33rd as highest degree to reach this goal. The lodge claims further no political or economical objectives. It propagates ideals of freedom, tolerance and fraternity.

== History ==
=== Origins: Pansophia Lodge and the Weida Conference ===
The Fraternitas Saturni was founded in the wake of the so-called "Weida Conference" in 1925. It succeeded the "Collegium Pansophicum, Orient Berlin" (Pansophic Lodge), a Rosicrucian magical order founded by Heinrich Tränker, a notable German occultist of the time. The Weida Conference was meant to consolidate Aleister Crowley's claims to be the Outer Head of Ordo Templi Orientis and the expected World Teacher. The conference consisted of Crowley's entourage of Leah Hirsig, Dorothy Olsen, and Norman Mudd and the members of Tränker's "Pansophic Lodge". Tränker had served as a X° National Grand Master of the German O.T.O. under Theodor Reuss up until Reuss' death. Also attending the conference were the notable film pioneer Albin Grau and Gregor A. Gregorius.

The conference was not a smooth event and Tränker withdrew his support of Crowley. The differences between Tränker and Crowley led to a schism in the Pansophic Lodge between the brothers who disagreed with Crowley and those who accepted Crowley's Law of Thelema, including Gregorius and Grau. Following these differences the Pansophic Lodge would be officially closed in 1926. Those brothers of the Pansophic Lodge who accepted the teachings of Crowley would join Grosche in founding the Fraternitas Saturni - but without Albin Grau.

=== Founding ===
At Easter 1928, the Fraternitas Saturni was officially founded in Berlin. The Lodge made a formal acceptance of The Book of the Law but they would not answer to Crowley. The FS still thought of him as an important teacher and included the Law of Thelema in most of its teachings, while divorcing itself from direct contact with him. This resulted in the FS developing a different take on the idea of Thelema, which is reflected in the rituals and magical techniques of the brotherhood. The emphasis of the FS lies more on astrological and Luciferian teachings, rather than on Qabalah and Tarot compared to other western magical orders founded in the early 20th century. Because of its unique approach to modern occultism, the FS is considered by many modern authors to be the most influential German magical order.

In 1936, the Fraternitas Saturni was prohibited by the Nazi regime. Gregorius as well as other leaders of the lodge emigrated in order to avoid imprisonment, but in the course of the war Grosche was arrested for a year by the Nazi government.

=== After World War II ===
The end of World War II saw the reactivation of Fraternitas Saturni. First from Riesa in East Germany and later from Berlin, Gregorius tried to contact the Brothers and found lodges in several German cities. By 1957 lodges existed in Düsseldorf, Hamburg, Frankfurt and Stuttgart, with the Grand Lodge in Berlin. In 1960 the FS had, according to its membership list, about 100 members, but in 1962 internal problems led to the expulsion of several members. Following Grosche's death in 1964, the lodge experienced confusion concerning the position of Grandmaster. This resulted in a schism between the Frankfurt lodge and the main body of the Order. In 1969 the two separate groups of the Fraternitas Saturni were reunified, ending the former conflicts.

==== List of grandmasters ====
- Gregor A. Gregorius (1928–1964) (Eugen Grosche)
- Roxane (1964–1965)
- Daniel (1966–1969)
- Jananda (1969)
- Andrzey (1969–1977)
- Horus (1977–1978)
- Drakon (1978–1982)
- Hamupe (1983–1986)
- Babacan (1986–1990)
- Thot (1990–)

== Structure ==
=== Development ===
Originally, there existed eight degrees within the Fraternitas Saturni, not including the Novice, who was not a regular member but a candidate to the Order, and the Grandmaster, which was not a degree in those days but a position held by a single master of the highest degree, guiding the affairs of the lodge. A new member of the Pronaos held the degree of Neophyt (Apprentice), the second degree was called Gradus Mercurii (Journeyman), followed by the Gradus Solis (Master). The first degree in the second order of R + C was called the Gradus Pentalphae, followed by the Gradus Sigilli Salomonis and the Magus Heptagrammatos. The third order called the S. S. G., was formed by the degrees of Templarius, Gnosticus and Magister Aquarius.

The system of degrees was changed in 1960. After the reformation of the degree system and its expansion to 33 degrees, the Gradus Mercurii became 8°, Gradus Solis became 12° and the Gradus Pentalphae became 18°. The other Grades were repositioned as well. The Templarius were renamed Princeps Arcani (24°) and a new degree of Magister Templarius (31°) were installed.

==== Outline of degree system ====
Old and new system of degrees
Pronaos
Pre-1960	Label	Post-1960	Label
–	Novize	0°	Neophyt
0°	Neophyt	1°	Scholasticus Voluntatis
		2°	Scholasticus Verbi
		3°	Scholasticus Vitae
1°	Frater / Soror	4°	Frater / Soror
		5°	Servus Juris
		6°	Servus Templi
		7°	Servus Ritus
2°	Gradus Mercurii	8°	Gradus Mercurii
		9°	Servus Pentaculi
		10°	Servus Tabernaculi
		11°	Servus Mysterii
R + C
3°	Gradus Solis	12°	Gradus Solis
		13°	Servus Selectus Imaginationis
		14°	Servus Selectus Magicus
		15°	Servus Selectus Elementorum
		16°	Sacerdos Aiones
		17°	Sacerdos Maximus
4°	Gradus Pentalphae	18°	Magus Pentalphae
5°	Gradus Sigilii Salomonis	19°	Magus Sigilii Salomonis
6°	Magus Heptagrammatos	20°	Magus Heptagrammatos
S. S. G.
		21°	Magister Selectus Sapientiae
		22°	Magister perfectum Potestatum
		23°	Magister Magnificus Pneumaticos
7°	Templarius	24°	Princeps Arcani
8°	Gnosticus	25°	Magister Gnosticus
9°	Magister Aquarii	26°	Magister Aquarii
		Hochwürden
		27°	Groß-Komtur
		28°	Groß-Kanzler
		29°	Groß-Inspekteur
		Hochwürdengrade
		30°	Magister Maximus Cados
		31°	Magister Templarius
		32°	Princeps Illustris Tabernaculi
	"Meister vom Stuhl" / Grandmaster	33°	Gradus Ordinis Templi Orientis Saturni

=== Contents ===
In the 1950s, the first two degrees of the Fraternitas Saturni were of theoretical character. The first degree to be attained by work was the Gradus Mercurii (8°). The conditions centered on basic understanding of esoteric principles and a written essay. The second degree to be attained by work was the Gradus Solis (12°), which required a deeper understanding of lodge ritual and two essays. This degree qualified the Initiate to lead a lodge of the FS. Today these degrees require theoretical understanding as well as practical work in the field of occultism.

Another important degree was the Frater (4°), which contained an oath of lifelong commitment. This was later changed and the vow was made part of the attainment of the Gradus Solis. After 1960, the Gradus Solis marked the member as a part of the inner order, the so-called "Grand-Lodge Fraternitas Saturni".

Much speculation has been made around the content of the Gradus Pentalphae (18°), the degree of the pentagram or the five pointed star. As far as it is known, the work of the Gradus Pentalphae was centered on tantric mysticism and sex magic. As many faked documents have been published it is hard to verify the rumors about the contents of this degree.

The Initials of the degree of Gradus Ordinis Templi Orientis Saturni (33°) are similar to the name of the egregore of the lodge - GOTOS.

== Current lodges ==
=== Fraternitas Saturni ===
The Fraternitas Saturni became a legal organisation, registered as "Fraternitas Saturni, e.v." in 1957. The Fraternitas Saturni is, beside incorporating new attempts on magic, still working on its traditional roots and enhancing the concept of "Saturn-Magic" as the center of its work. On its 75th anniversary (2003), the lodge incorporated another order of the so-called "Immanuel-succession", the "Grand-Lodge Gregor A. Gregorius". This unification effectively doubled the size of its membership. The Fraternitas Saturni claims to have working lodges in Germany, Austria and Switzerland.

== See also ==
- Esotericism in Germany and Austria
