= School of Infancy =

Essay by Comenius on education of children until the age of 6

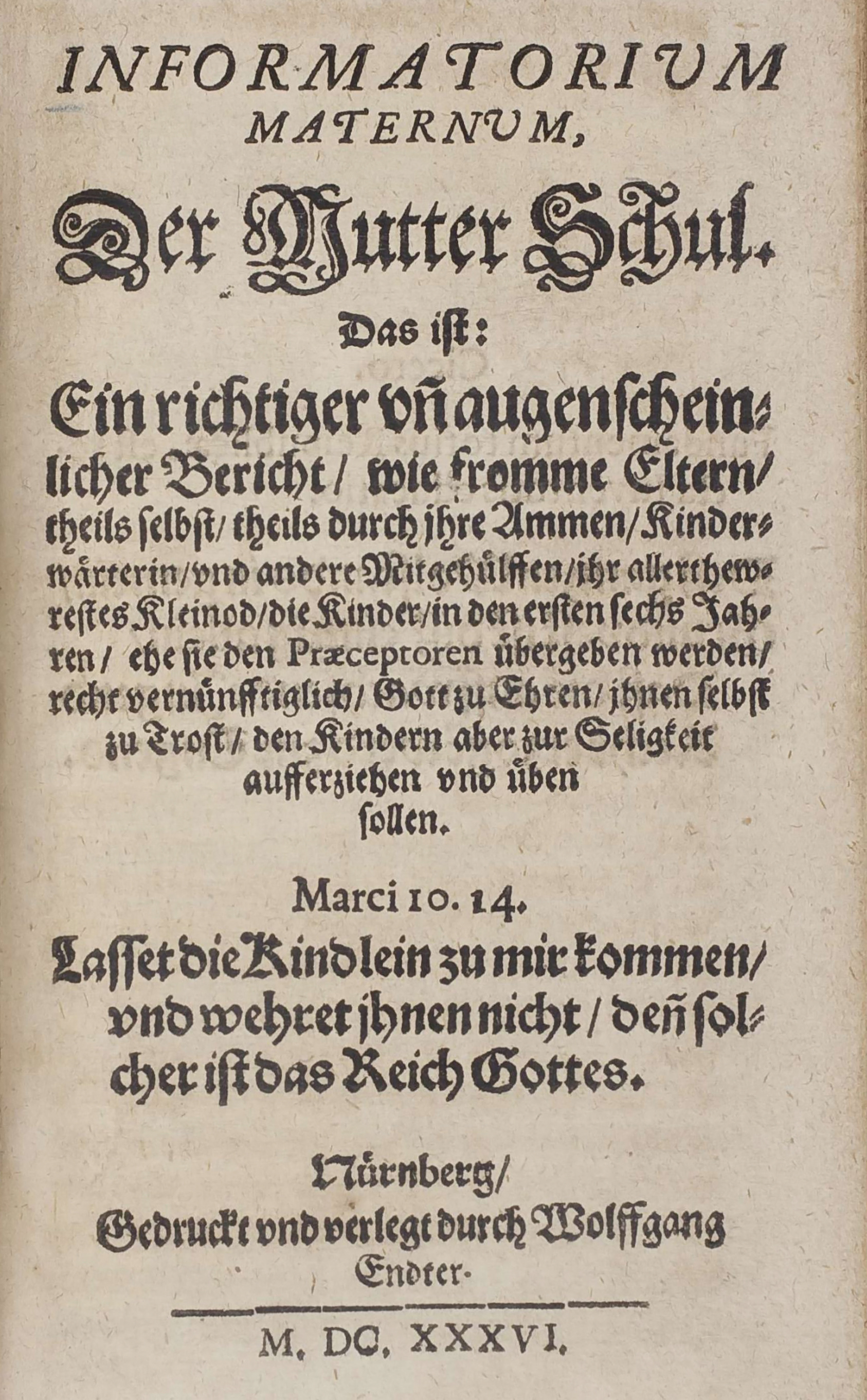
School of Infancy, in German: Informatorium Maternum (1636)

School of Infancy (Czech: Informatorium školy mateřské, full title:Soustavné pojednání o výchově předškolních dětí) is the first written work in the field of preschool education in world literature on pedagogy. It was written by Jan Amos Comenius in 1632 in the Polish town of Leszno. The work emerged as part of efforts to reform Czech education, with the Informatorium intended to be a component of a well-thought-out plan for lifelong education, as further elucidated in the Great Didactics.

== Overview ==
The manuscript of the work was discovered in Leszno in 1856 and was first published in print in 1858. Comenius translated this work into German in 1633, likely into Polish in 1636, and into Latin in 1653.

The book is divided into twelve chapters, serving as a guide for educators of young children, providing an analysis of all the crucial aspects of preschool education. Comenius aimed to make educators aware of how a child naturally acquaints themselves with the world, emphasizing that at this age, the foundation for further education is laid. According to him, the interaction of a child with objects and phenomena can be influenced to prepare them for formal schooling, for which preschool education serves as a natural preparation. The work emphasizes the necessity of nurturing care for the youngest children, focusing not only on maternal upbringing but also involving fathers and others in the child's upbringing.

The main goal of the Informatorium is an attempt to reform the educational system. This work is unique in that it is the first early modern systematic treatise on the upbringing of children in the youngest age group. The impact of the work was felt primarily in later times, not directly during the author's lifetime. It is the first work of its time (17th century) in which the necessity of caring for the youngest children is justified. The author emphasizes the importance of caring for a child from birth and describes the significance of this upbringing for the child's further development and future life. Despite the fact that the field of child psychology did not exist at that time, Comenius's ideas have not lost their relevance.

== See also ==
- Comeniology
