= Labyrinth of the World and Paradise of the Heart =

Book by Jan Amos Comenius

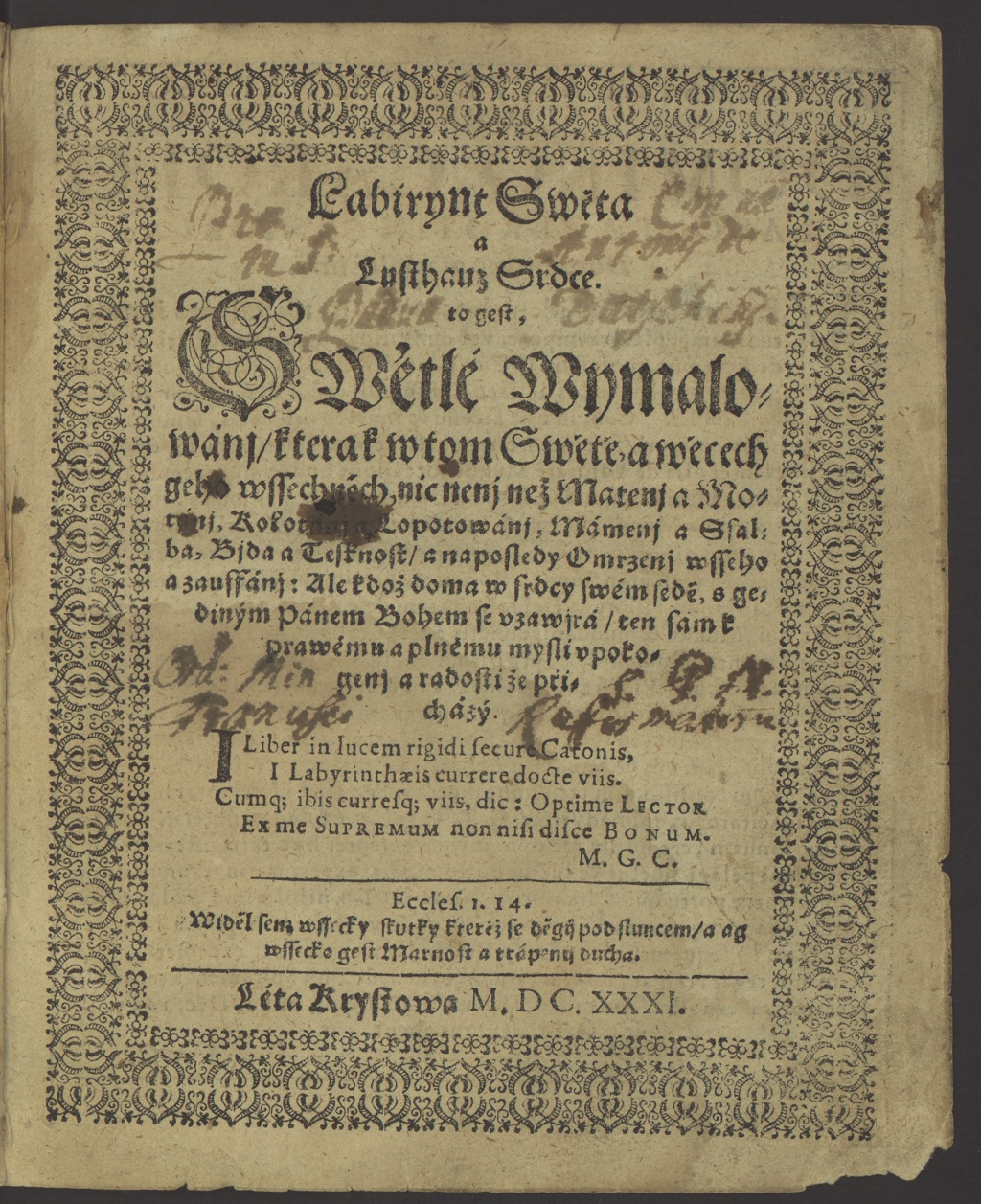
Titlepage of the first edition of the Labyrinth of the World and Paradise of the Heart, 1631

Labyrinth of the World and Paradise of the Heart is a book by John Amos Comenius. The book is a satirical allegory. Considered a jewel of Baroque literature, it is one of the author's most important works. Comenius finished the first version in 1623, but he rewrote the book several times, changing its concept and form. The book remains the most widely read work of older Czech literature.

== Summary ==
The world is portrayed as a city which resembles a labyrinth, entered by a pilgrim (the narrator and author himself). The city has The Gate of Entering, and The Gate of Separation; six main streets which represent the six classes of the world; The Castle of Fortune in its middle; and The Common Square.

In Part One of the book, Labyrinth of the World (Chapters 1–36), the pilgrim is joined by two guides, Searchall Ubiquitous (allegory of human curiosity and longing for knowledge), and Delusion (allegory of indolent adopting of conventional and shallow thoughts). He seeks a job for himself that would best suit both his body and soul. The guides, however, prevent the pilgrim from seeing reality by making him watch the world through pink-coloured glasses. He captures glimpses of the reality only seldom. That is why he cannot find the right choice; even in the Castle of Wisdom he sees Vanity.

He sees human life as meaningless, and is terrified by death; yet he finds salvation in Part Two of the book, Paradise of the Heart (Chapters 37–54), where he returns to his heart, being called there by God. There he is visited by Christ who tells him what the real meaning of the world is, so the pilgrim, now transformed, can join the Invisible Church and see it through new glasses which are the word or sound of God and the Holy Spirit. He finally beholds the Glory of God and is received among God's own. For this, he thanks with a prayer and a hymn that celebrates the Glory, Beauty and Love of God.

The book is written in an artistic language. It is a poetical vision, and Comenius doesn't just criticize society; he also tries to capture the progress of Man in general (and show the dualism of material and spiritual ways of life). He points at the vanity of human endeavour that focuses on the material world and tells the reader that one must follow the will of God, as it is revealed in the Bible.

As mentioned above, the book remains very popular and is still in print (so far the last two editions in the Czech Republic appeared in 2001, which was sold out very soon, and 2005). The new Moravian Library building which was opened in Brno on 2 April 2001 has a stone relief of the Labyrinth on its front wall. It is now available in an illustrated English edition.

== See also ==
- Orbis Pictus
- Comeniology
- Great Didactic
- John Amos Comenius
