= Nivnice =

- Municipality
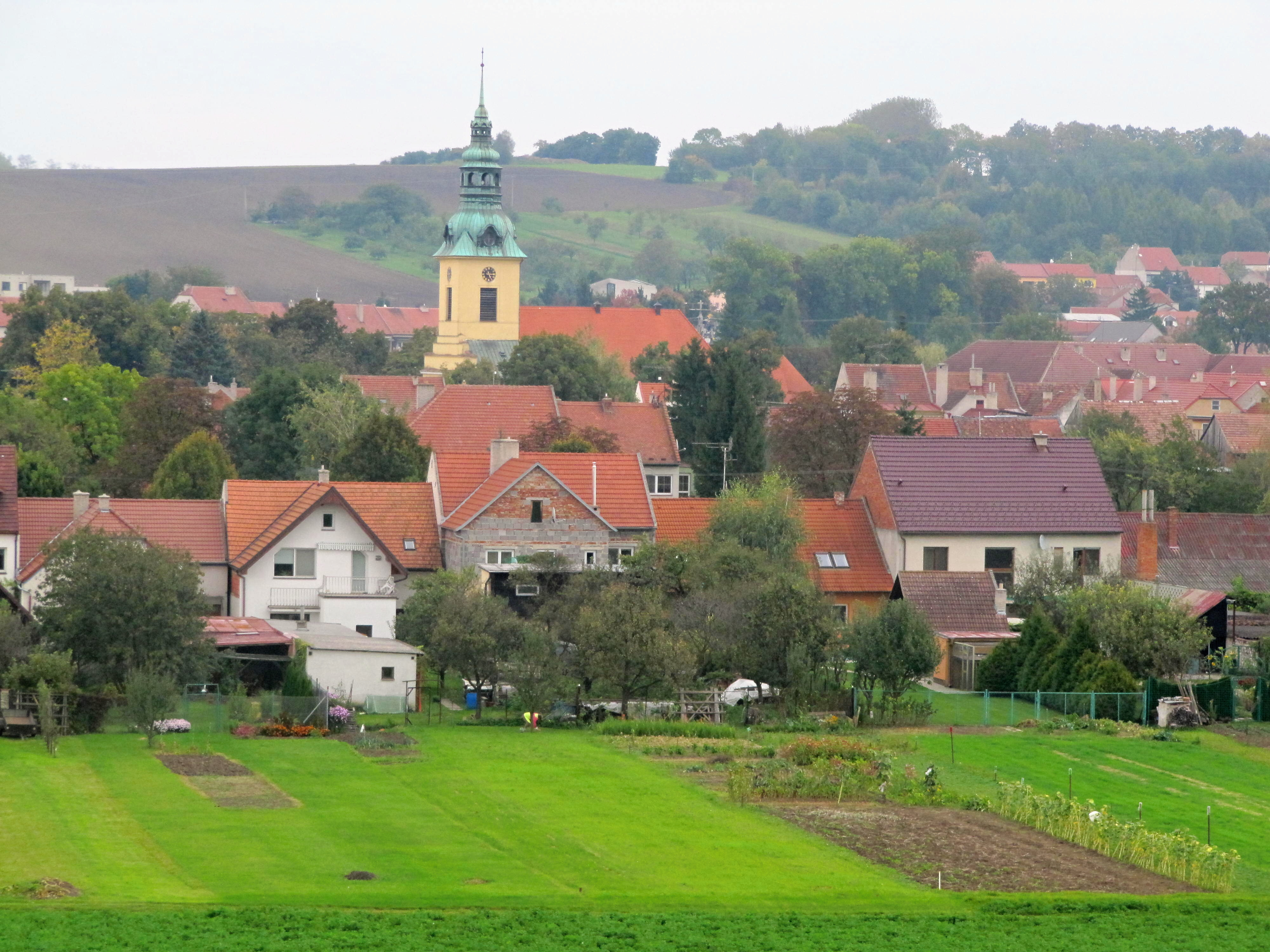
- View from the west

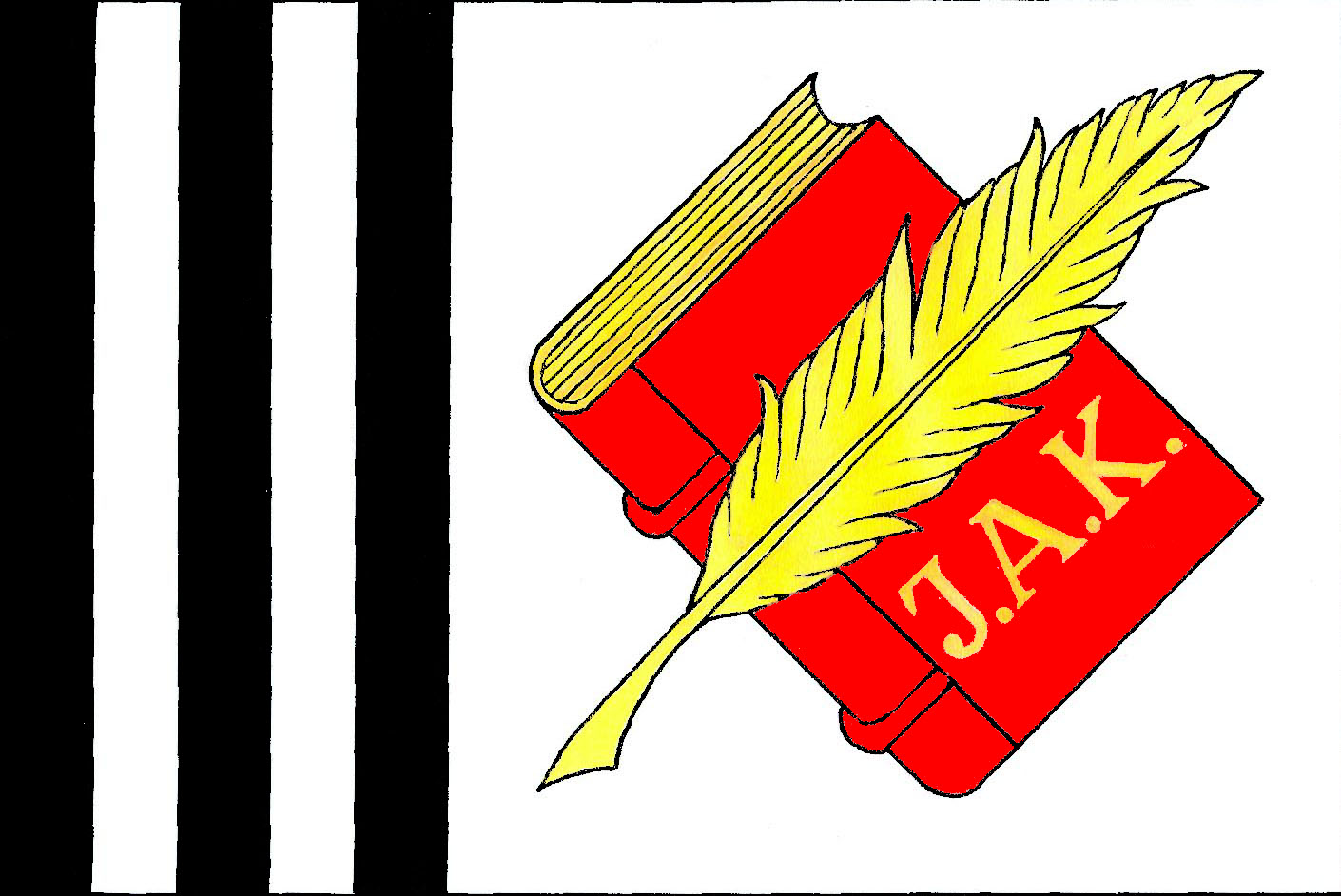
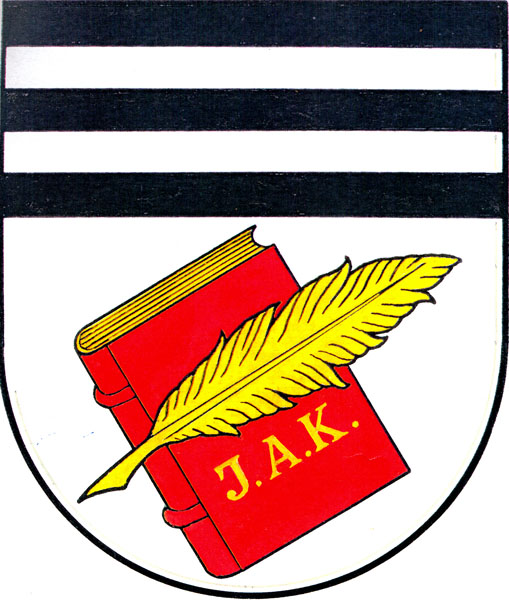
- Flag Coat of arms

- Location in the Czech Republic
- Coordinates: 48°58′29″N 17°38′51″E
- Country: Czech Republic
- Region: Zlín
- District: Uherské Hradiště
- First mentioned: 1261

Area
  - Total: 25.48 km^{2} (9.84 sq mi)
- Elevation: 247 m (810 ft)

Population (2026-01-01)
  - Total: 3,347
  - Density: 131.4/km^{2} (340.2/sq mi)
- Time zone: UTC+1 (CET)
  - Summer (DST): UTC+2 (CEST)
- Postal code: 687 51
- Website: www.nivnice.cz

Nivnice (Czech pronunciation: [ˈɲɪvɲɪtsɛ]) is a municipality and village in Uherské Hradiště District in the Zlín Region of the Czech Republic. It has about 3,300 inhabitants. It is known as the most probable birthplace of the philosopher and pedagogue John Amos Comenius.

== Geography ==
Nivnice is located about 16 kilometres (10 mi) southeast of Uherské Hradiště and 28 km (17 mi) south of Zlín. It lies in the Vizovice Highlands. The highest point is at 360 m (1,181 ft) above sea level. The Nivnička Stream flows through the municipality.

== History ==
The first written mention of Nivnice is from 1261.

== Demographics ==
Historical population

Year	Pop.	±%
1869	1,463	—
1880	1,644	+12.4%
1890	1,793	+9.1%
1900	2,228	+24.3%
1910	2,500	+12.2%

Year	Pop.	±%
1921	2,614	+4.6%
1930	2,596	−0.7%
1950	2,943	+13.4%
1961	3,283	+11.6%
1970	3,198	−2.6%

Year	Pop.	±%
1980	3,213	+0.5%
1991	3,259	+1.4%
2001	3,236	−0.7%
2011	3,277	+1.3%
2021	3,217	−1.8%

Source: Censuses

== Economy ==
Nivnice is the seat of a major beverage producer and the largest fruit processor in the country, the company Linea Nivnice.

== Transport ==
There are no railways or major roads passing through the municipality.

== Sights ==
The main landmark of Nivnice is the Church of the Holy Guardian Angels. It was built in 1741.

== Notable people ==
- John Amos Comenius (1592–1670), philosopher and pedagogue; most probable birthplace
- Pavel Soukeník (1962–1988), sport shooter
