= Albin Grau =

German architect (1884–1971)

Albin Grau

Albin Grau (December 22, 1884 in Leipzig-Schönefeld – March 27, 1971) was a German artist, architect and occultist, and the producer and production designer for F.W. Murnau's Nosferatu (1922). He was largely responsible for the look and spirit of the film, including the sets, costumes, storyboards and promotional materials.

A lifelong student of the occult and member of Fraternitas Saturni, under the magical name of Master Pacitius, Grau was able to imbue Nosferatu with hermetic and mystical undertones. One example in particular was the cryptic contract that Count Orlok and Knock exchanged, which was filled with Enochian, hermetic and alchemical symbols. Grau was also a strong influence on Orlok's verminous and emaciated look. Grau claimed to have originally gotten the idea of shooting a vampire film while serving in the German Army during World War I, when a Serbian farmer told him that his father was a vampire and one of the Undead, though this story may have been fabricated to promote the film.

Before Grau and Murnau collaborated on Nosferatu, which was shot in 1921, Grau was planning to create several movies devoted to the occult and supernatural through his studio, Prana Film. Since Nosferatu was a loose and unauthorized translation of Bram Stoker's Dracula Prana had to declare bankruptcy in order to evade infringement lawsuits. This made Nosferatu its one and only release.

== The Weida Conference ==
In 1925 Grau participated in the Weida Conference, an international meeting of occult leaders at Hohenleuben, along with his lodge secretary Eugen Grosche (Frater Gregorius), Master of the Danzig Lodge, Otto Gebhardi (Frater Ich will), Gebhardi's lover Martha Kuntzel (Soror Ich will es), Heinrich Tranker (as Frater Recnartus, head of the Rosicrucian occult lodge Collegium Pansophicum, a.k.a. Pansophic Orient Lodge, Berlin) and his wife Helen, and Aleister Crowley with his entourage of Leah Hirsig, Dorothy Olsen, and Norman Mudd. Grau shot a film of the conference, currently lost. The conference was not a smooth event and Traenker withdrew his support of Crowley. The differences between Traenker and Crowley led to a schism in the Pansophical Lodge between the brothers who disagreed with Crowley and those who accepted Crowley's Law of Thelema, including Gregorius and Grau. Following these differences the Pansophical Lodge would be officially closed in 1926. Those brothers of the Pansophia Lodge who accepted the teachings of Crowley would join Grosche in founding the Fraternitas Saturni.

Pacitius (Grau) gave up all his lodge titles, refusing the invitation to head the new order, and left the Master's Chair of the Fraternitas Saturni, Orient Berlin, to Eugen Grosche, who would lead it as Master Gregorius into the new Aquarian/Saturnian age. Grau contributed fascinating, if mathematically obscure, articles on sacred geometry to Saturn Gnosis, the periodical of the Fraternitas Saturni (five issues between July 1928 and March 1930).

== Later years ==
After Fraternitas Saturni was prohibited in 1936 by the Nazi regime, Albin Grau was threatened with persecution but managed to emigrate to Switzerland.

After the war, he returned to Germany and pursued a career in commercial art and lived in the Alpine village of Bayrischzell, Upper Bavaria, until his death in 1971. Bayrischzell honours him to this day.

== In popular culture ==
Albin Grau was one of the main characters in the fictionalized movie account of the filming of Nosferatu, titled Shadow of the Vampire (2000), directed by American filmmaker E. Elias Merhige. He was played by Udo Kier.

In the 2024 Nosferatu remake, the name of Professor Albin Eberhart von Franz (a counterpart to Van Helsing) is a reference to Grau.
