= Kristina Poniatowská =

German female visionary

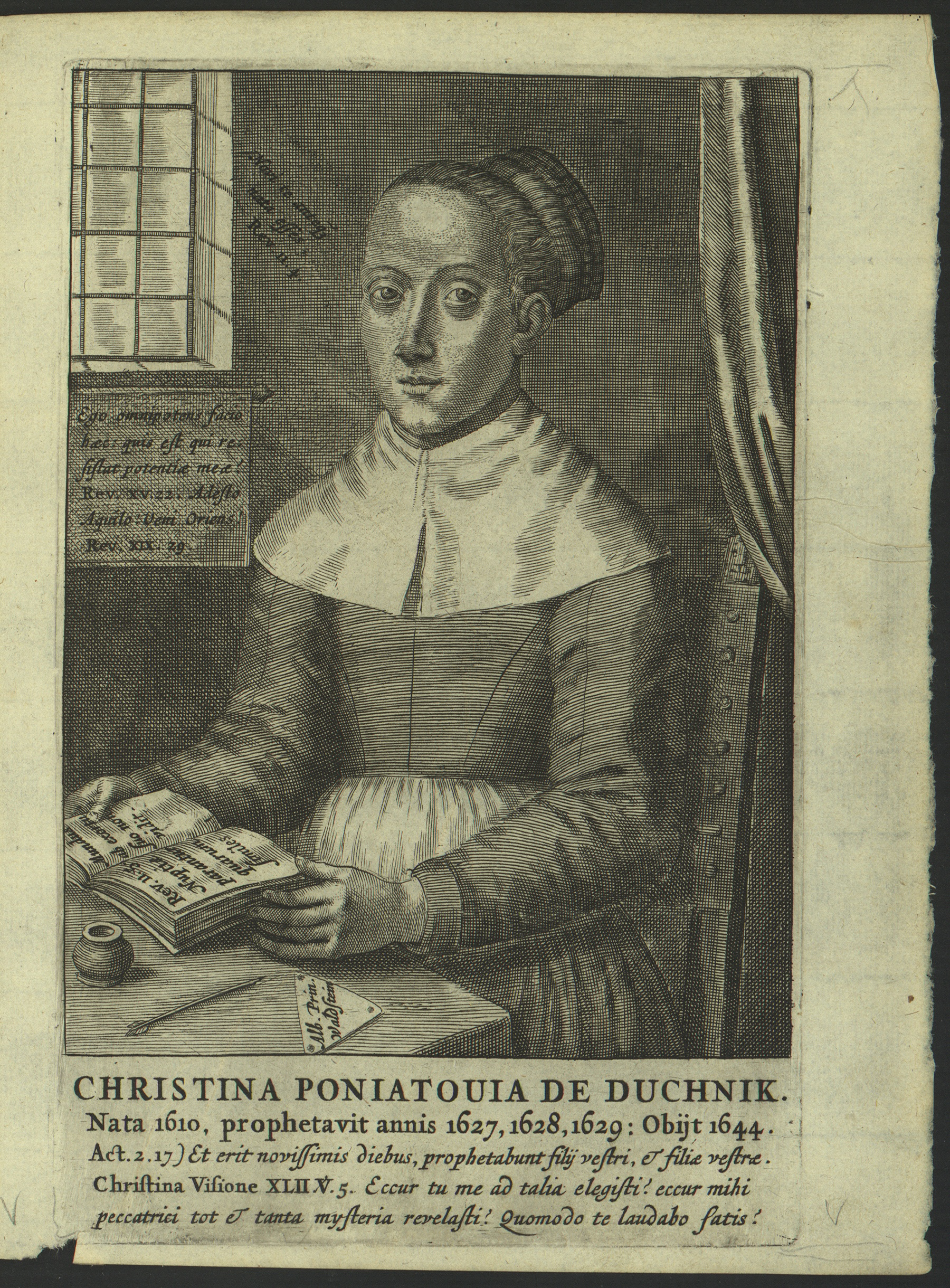
- Born: 1610; Łasin
- Died: 6 December 1644 (aged 33–34); Leszno
- Spouse(s): Daniel Strejc-Vetterus

Kristina Poniatowská (1610 – 6 December 1644) was a Polish noblewoman and visionary.

Poniatowská was born in 1610 in Łasin, Western Prussia. Her father, Julian Poniatowa, was a Polish gentleman who, having escaped from a monastery and embraced Protestantism, was at first minister at Duchnick, in Bohemia, then librarian of a nobleman. He probably brought up his daughter in mystical ideas, for he is said to be himself the author of a Latin dissertation on the knowledge which the angels may have of God. Christine had been entrusted to the care of the baroness of Zelking, who had taken a liking to her, when, on 12 November 1627, after severe pains, she fell into a trance, attended with visions and prophetic utterances relating to the future of the Reformed Church. This strange state returned at regular intervals for a whole year, always attended with the same phenomena, and a number of people testified to its genuineness. 27 January 1629, the young visionary fell into so heavy a lethargy that she passed for dead, but when she finally recovered her senses she declared that her mission was fulfilled, and that she should thenceforth have no more visions. In 1632 she was married to a Moravian minister, Daniel Strejc-Vetterus, and died on 6 December 1644, at Leszno, near Posen. Her revelations, written by herself, were translated into Latin, and published by John Amos Comenius, with those of Christopher Kotter and Nicolas Drabicki, under the title Lux in Tenebris (1657, 1659, 1665). They were retranslated into German by Benedict Balmsen (Amsterdam, 1664).
