= Eugen Grosche =

German occultist and astrologer

Eugen Grosche (11 March 1888, in Leipzig – 5 January 1964), also known as Gregor A. Gregorius, was a German occultist and author. He was founder and Grandmaster of the lodge Fraternitas Saturni from 1926 till 1964.

== Life and work ==
Most of his life Gregorius lived in Berlin. He was initially a member of an Evangelical church and was a member of the Weida Conference in 1925. In the wake of the Conference he founded the Fraternitas Saturni in 1926. Using his own book store and publishing house, he began publishing Magische Briefe (1926-1927), Saturn-Gnosis (1928-1933), and finally, fourteen Lectures of the Lodge-School.

The actual accomplishment of Gregorius and the FS was a more or less cohesive synthesis of Ancient and Accepted Scottish Rite Freemasonry, Luciferianism, astrological mythology, Crowleyanity (or Thelemism), sex-magical practices of the old O.T.O., various Indian yogic systems, and medieval and modern doctrines of alchemy and ritual magic.

During World War II he emigrated to Switzerland in order to avoid imprisonment, but in the course of the war he was arrested for a year by the Nazi government. After World War II Gregorius reformed Fraternitas Saturni. In 1954 he published Die magische Erweckung der Chakra, and in 1960 the novel Exorial. He died in 1964 after a heart attack.

== Published works ==
- Exorial (Selbstverlag, 1960)
- Magische Briefe, originally published 1926-1927, republished in Richard Schikowski, 1980.
- Saturn-Gnosis, 1928-1933.
- Pendelmagie (Richard Schikowski, 1980)
- Sympathiemagie (Richard Schikowski, 1980)
- Satanische Magie, the title of Magischer Brief 7 (1926), reprinted in: Richard Schikowski, 1983. ISBN 3-87702-057-7
- Die magische Erweckung der Chakra, 1954, (reprint Esoterischer Verlag, 2005)
- Logenschulvorträge (Esoterischer Verlag, 2006)
- Geheimnisse der Sexualmagie (Esoterischer Verlag, 2007)
- Magische Einweihung (Esoterischer Verlag, 2007)
