= Dithmar Blefken =

Dithmar Blefken was a German preacher and minor 17th century geographer. Little is known about his life. He was a preacher in Hessen (Germany) 1594, Zoelen (Holland) 1597-1598, Wijk bij Duurstede (Holland) 1598-1603, Giessen (Holland) 1603-1609, in 1614 he still lives in Giessen.

Blefken is known for Islandia (complete name Islandia, sive Populorum & mirabilium quae in ea Insula reperiuntur accuratior descriptio), a description of Iceland published first in 1607 in Leiden. He claimed it to be based on his journey to the island while accompanying merchants from Hamburg; this is, however, not certain. Arngrímur Jónsson, a contemporary Icelandic scholar, was a fierce critic of Blefken's work (as well as of other authors). Although the book contained many inaccuracies it was quite influential at the time, especially in northern parts of Europe.

== Literature ==
- Monique Mund-Dopchie (Université catholique de Louvain): A beau mentir qui vient de loin: défaillances de la mémoire et forgeries dans l´Islandia du voyageur Dithmar Blefken (1cre éd. 1607), in Neulateinisches Jahrbuch, 2004, ISBN 3-487-12724-5.
- Wolfgang Müller: Neue Nordwelt, 2005, ISBN 3-935843-22-4. The German language book summarizes descriptions of Iceland by several authors, including Blefken.
