= John Amos Comenius =

Czech teacher, educator, philosopher and writer (1592–1670)

The Right Reverend John Amos Comenius
- Bishop of the Unity of the Brethren
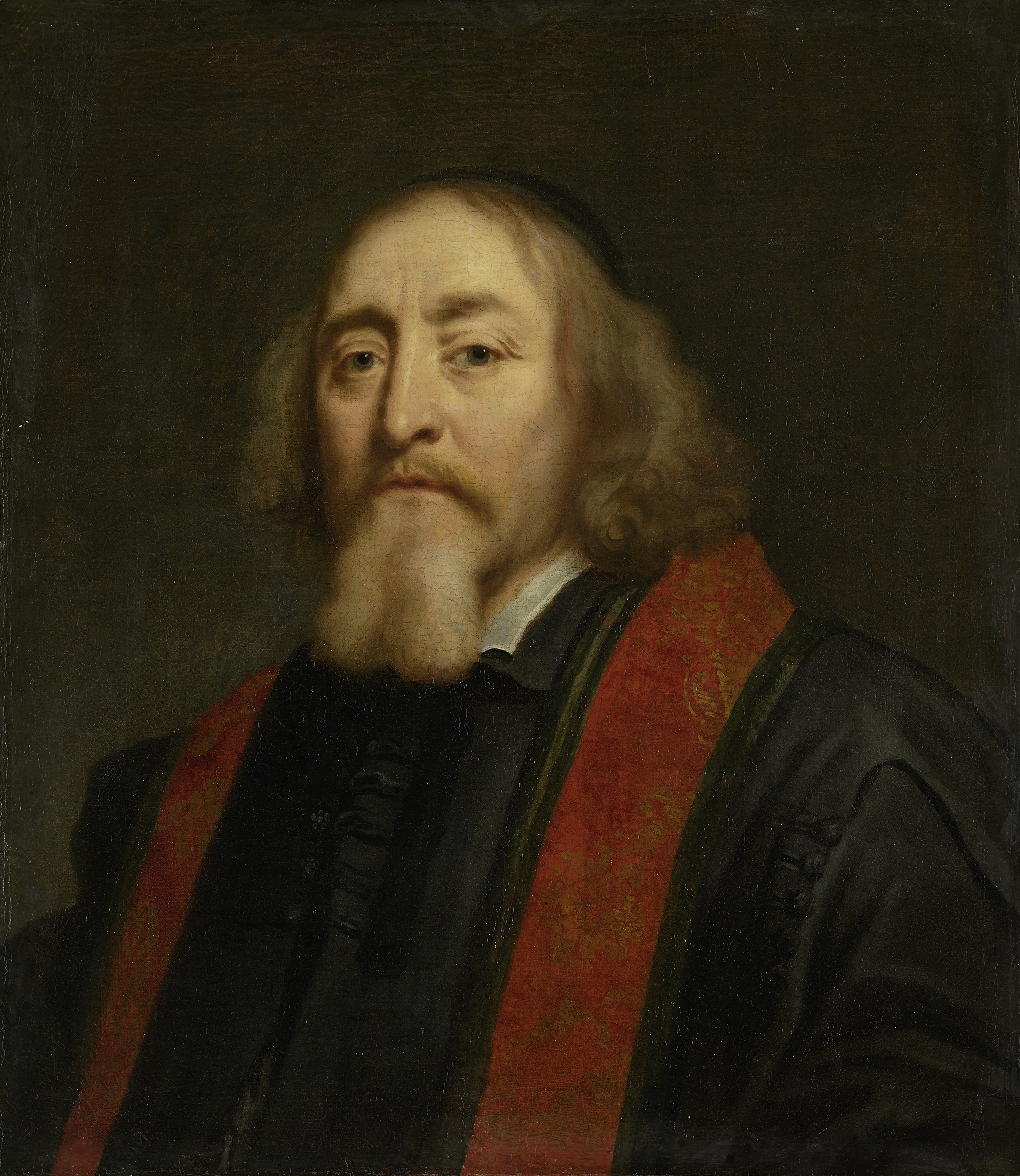
- Portrait, c. 1650–1670

Personal details
- Born: Jan Amos Komenský; Johann Amos Comenius; 28 March 1592 Nivnice, Moravia, Crown of Bohemia
- Died: 15 November 1670 (aged 78) Amsterdam, Holland, Dutch Republic
- Denomination: Unity of the Brethren (Bohemian Brethren)

Education
- Education: Herborn Academy (1611–1613); University of Heidelberg (1613–1614)

Philosophical work
- Main interests: Theology, philosophy of education
- Notable ideas: Pansophism

John Amos Comenius (/kəˈmiːniəs/; Czech: Jan Amos Komenský; German: Johann Amos Comenius; Polish: Jan Amos Komeński; Latinized: Ioannes Amos Comenius; 28 March 1592 – 15 November 1670) was a Czech philosopher, pedagogue and theologian who is considered the father of modern education. He served as the last bishop of the Unity of the Brethren (direct predecessor of the Moravian Church) before becoming a religious refugee and one of the earliest champions of universal education, a concept eventually set forth in his book Didactica Magna. As an educator and theologian, he led schools and advised governments across Protestant Europe through the middle of the seventeenth century and proposed the pedagogical concept of pansophism.

Comenius introduced a number of educational concepts and innovations including pictorial textbooks written in native languages instead of Latin, teaching based in gradual development from simple to more comprehensive concepts, lifelong learning with a focus on logical thinking over dull memorization, equal opportunity for impoverished children, education for women, and universal and practical instruction. He also believed heavily in the connection between nature, religion, and knowledge, in which he stated that knowledge is born from nature and nature from God.

A proud Moravian, he nevertheless for most of his life – mainly due to the difficult wartime circumstances in the homeland and fear from religious persecution – lived and worked as an exile in various regions of the Holy Roman Empire and other countries: Sweden, the Polish–Lithuanian Commonwealth, Transylvania, England, the Netherlands and Hungary. He turned down an offer to immigrate to the New England Colonies and take up the presidency of the newly founded Harvard University.

== Life and work ==
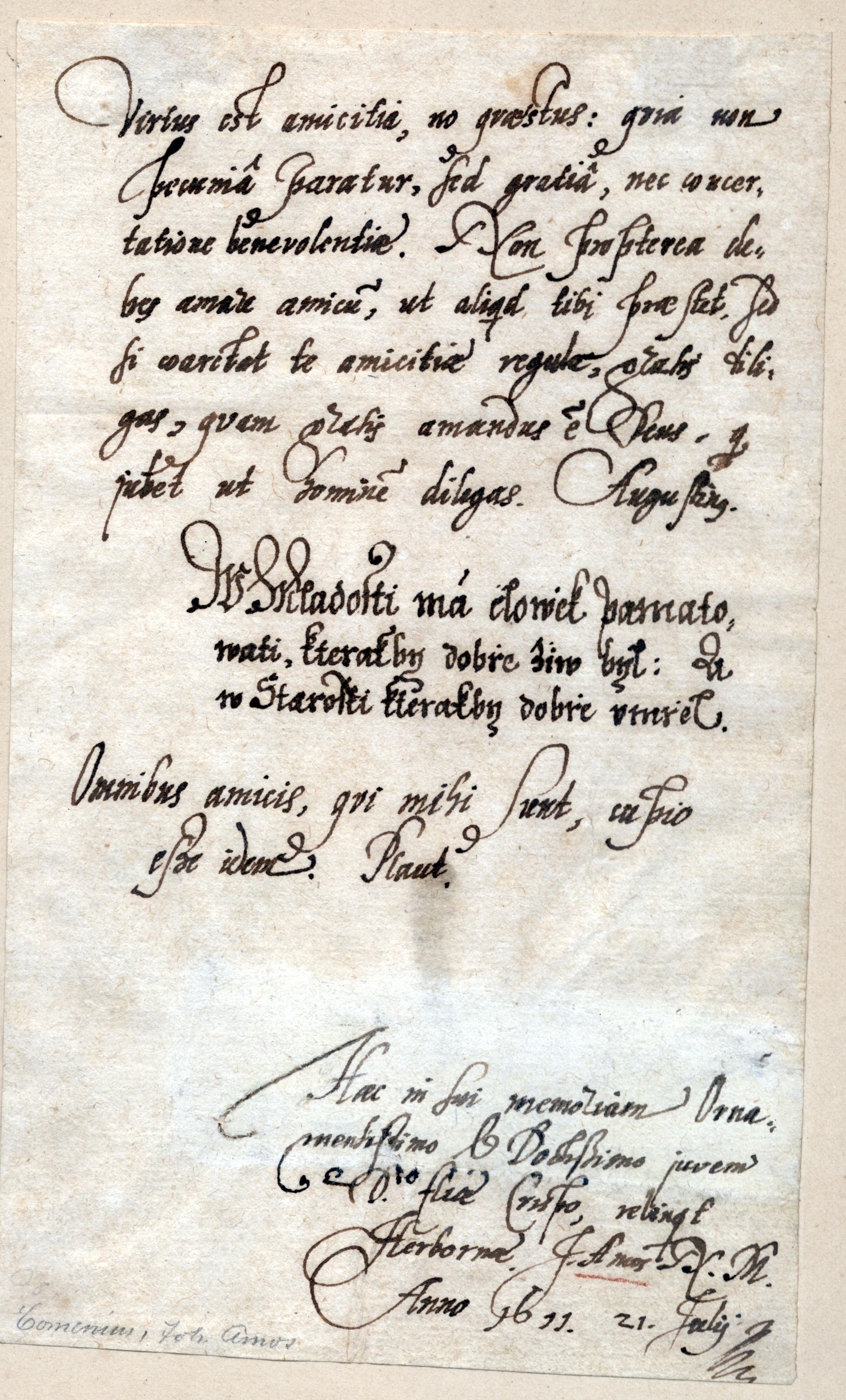
Oldest surviving manuscript by Comenius dated 1611; written in Latin and Czech

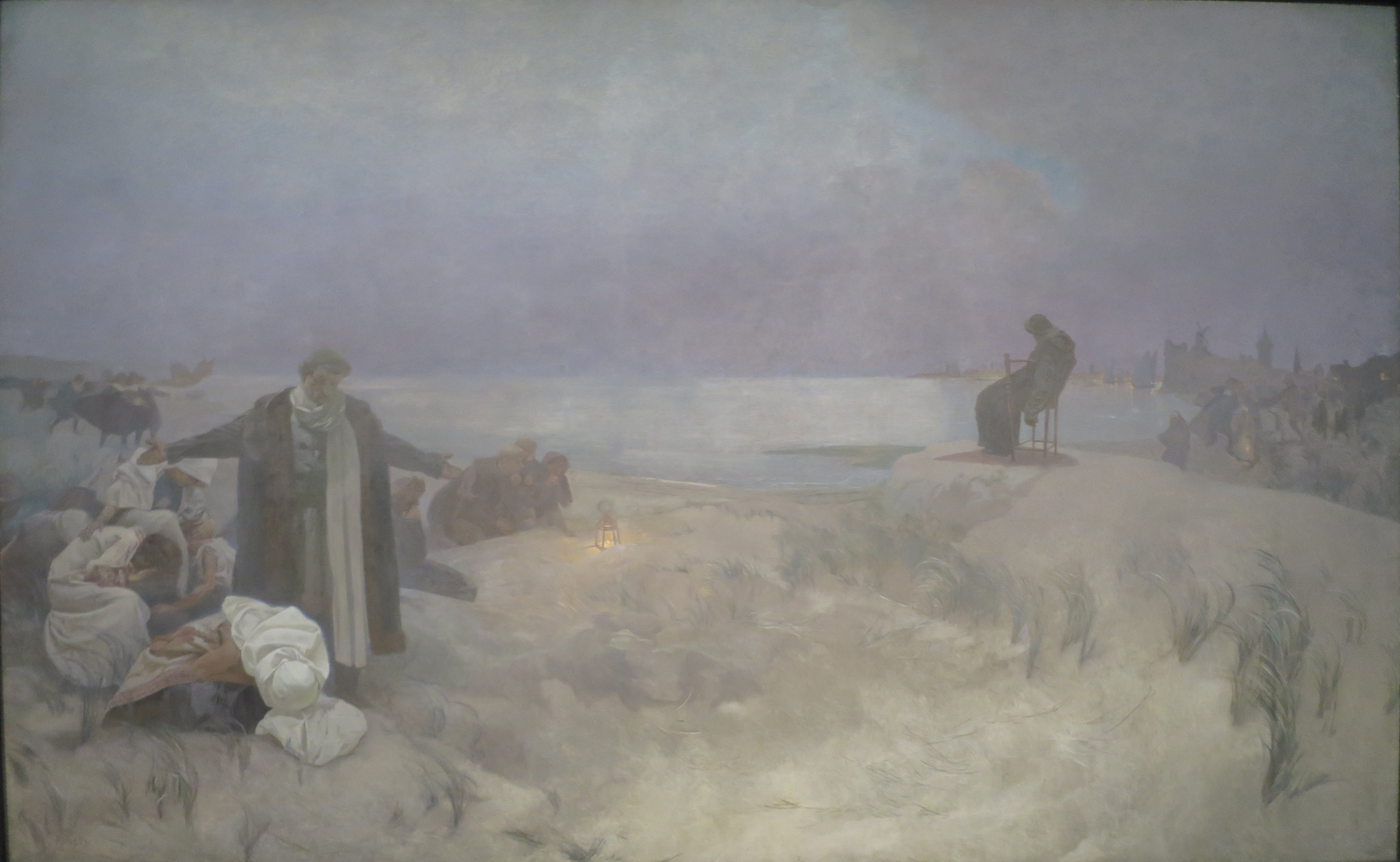
Alphonse Mucha's The Slav Epic cycle No.16: The Last days of Jan Amos Komenský in Naarden: A Flicker of Hope (1918)

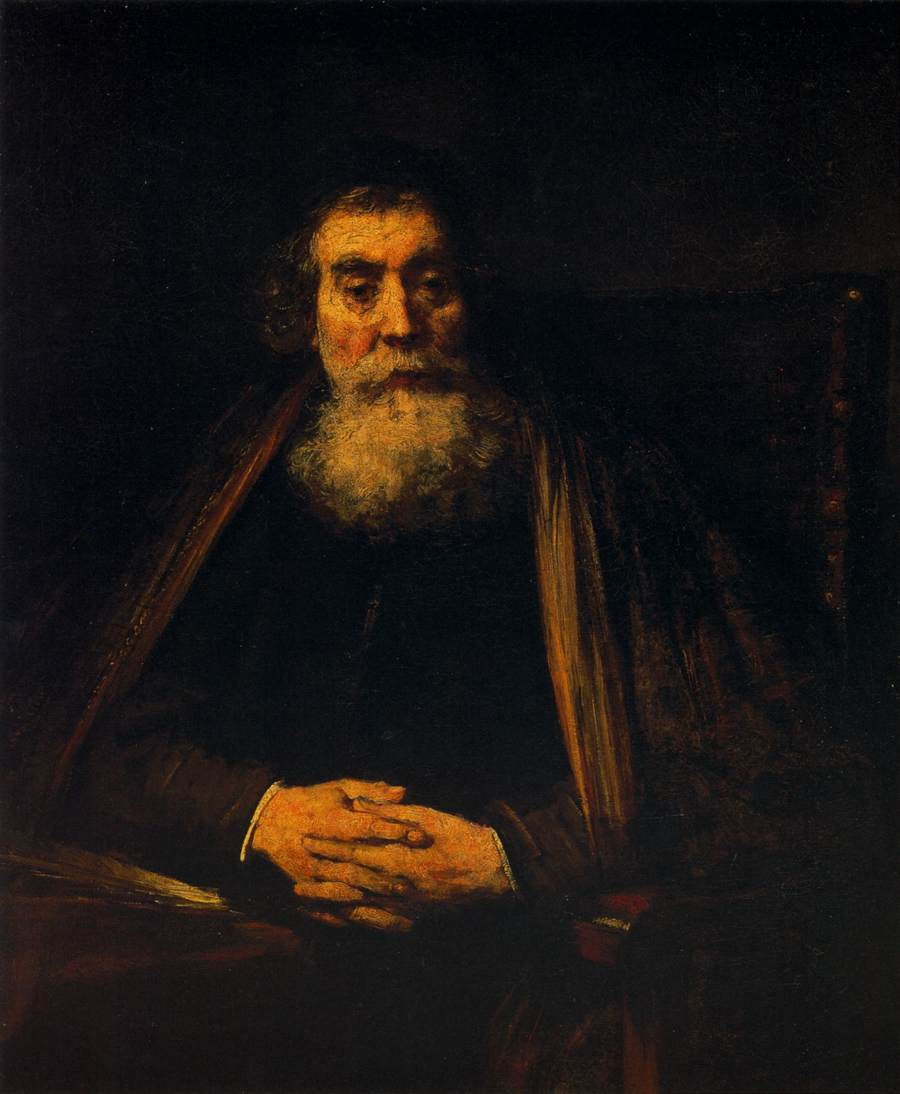
Portrait of an Old Man by Rembrandt, possibly a depiction of Comenius

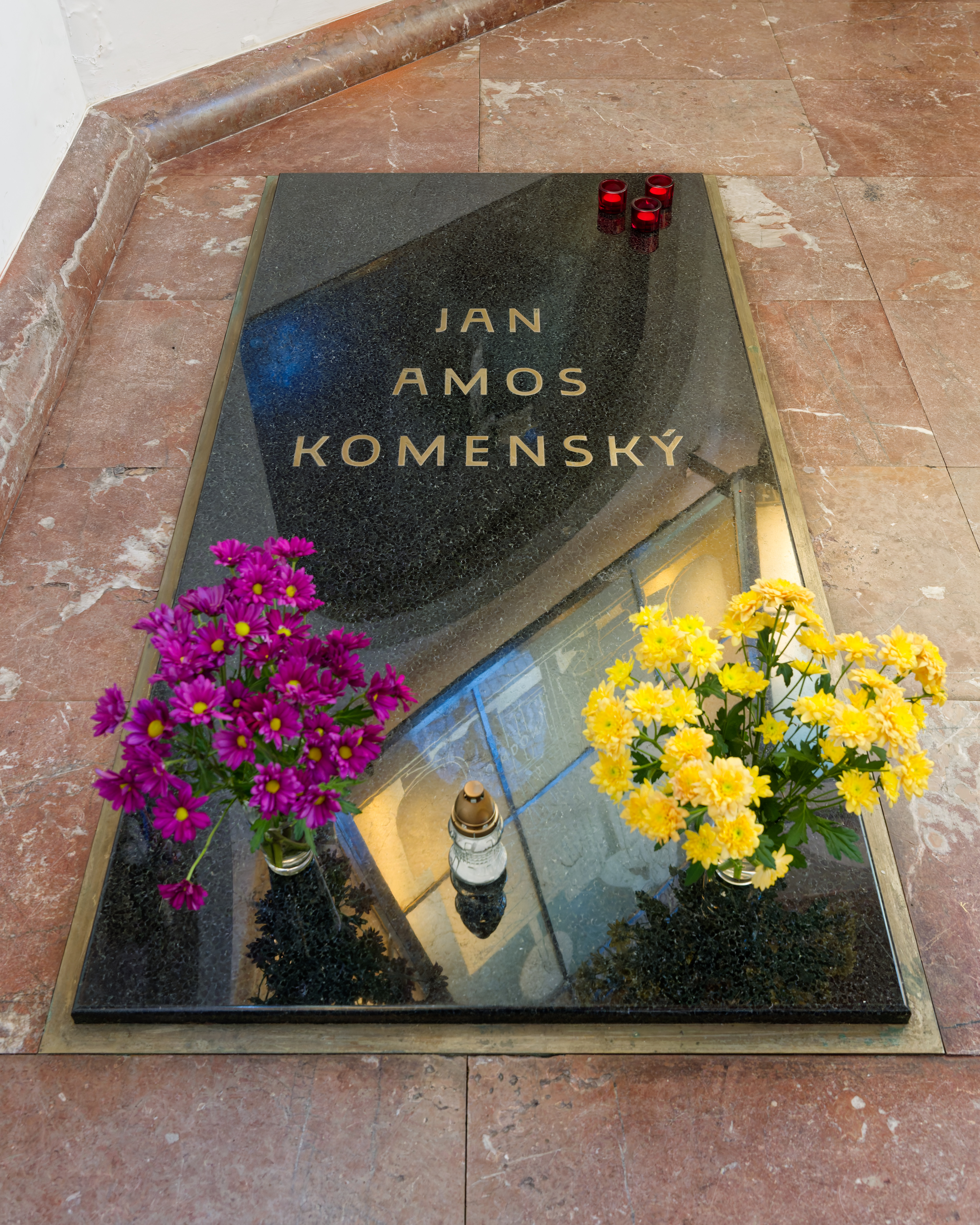
His grave in Naarden (the Netherlands)

John Amos Comenius was born in 1592 in the Margraviate of Moravia in the Bohemian Crown. His exact birthplace is uncertain and possibilities include Uherský Brod (as on his gravestone in Naarden), Nivnice, and Komňa (the village from which he took his surname, which means "man from Komňa"), all these localities being situated in the Uherské Hradiště District of today's Czech Republic. John was the youngest child and only son of Martin Komenský (died ca. 1602–1604) and his wife Anna Chmelová. His grandfather, whose name was Jan (János) Szeges, was of Hungarian origin. He began to use the surname Komenský after leaving Komňa to live in Uherský Brod. Martin and Anna Komenský belonged to the Bohemian Brethren, a pre-Reformation Protestant denomination, and Comenius later became one of its leaders. His parents and two of his four sisters died in 1604 and John, still a child, went to live with his aunt in Strážnice.

Owing to his impoverished circumstances he was unable to begin his formal education until his later teens. He was 16 when he entered the Latin school in Přerov, returning there later as a teacher 1614–1618. He continued his studies at the Herborn Academy (1611–1613) and at the University of Heidelberg (1613–1614). In 1612 he read the Rosicrucian manifesto Fama Fraternitatis. Comenius was also greatly influenced by the Irish Jesuit William Bathe as well as by his teachers Johann Piscator, Heinrich Gutberleth, and particularly Heinrich Alsted. The Herborn Academy maintained the principle that every theory has to be functional in practical use, therefore it has to be didactic (i.e. morally instructive). In the course of his studies, Comenius also became acquainted with the educational reforms of Ratichius and with the report of these reforms issued by the universities of Jena and Giessen.

Comenius became rector of a school in Přerov. In 1616 he was ordained into the ministry of the Bohemian Brethren and four years later became pastor and rector at Fulnek, one of the denomination's most flourishing churches. Throughout his life this pastoral activity was his most immediate concern. In consequence of the religious wars, in 1621 he lost all his property, including his writings. In 1627 he led the Brethren into exile when the Habsburg Counter-Reformation persecuted the Protestants in Bohemia. In 1628 he corresponded with Johann Valentin Andreae.

He produced the book Janua linguarum reserata, or The Gate of Languages Unlocked, which brought him to prominence. However, as the Unity became an important target of the Counter Reformation politics, he was forced into exile even as his fame grew across Europe. Comenius took refuge in Leszno (Lissa) in Poland, where he was head of the gymnasium school and was furthermore given charge of the Bohemian and Moravian churches.

In 1638 Comenius responded to a request by the government of Sweden and traveled there to draw up a scheme for the management of that country's schools.

After his religious duties, Comenius's second great interest was in furthering the Baconian attempt at the organization of all human knowledge. He became one of the leaders in the encyclopaedia or pansophic movement of the seventeenth century, and, in fact, was inclined to sacrifice his more practical educational interests and opportunities for these more imposing but somewhat visionary projects. In 1639, Comenius published his Pansophiae Prodromus, and in the following year his English friend Samuel Hartlib published, without his consent, the plan of the pansophic work as outlined by Comenius. These pansophic ideas find partial expression in the textbooks he produced from time to time. In these, he attempts to organize the entire field of human knowledge so as to bring it, in outline, within the grasp of every child. Comenius also attempted to design a language in which false statements could not be expressed.

In 1641, Comenius responded to a request from the English Long Parliament and joined a commission there established to reform the system of public education. The English Civil War interfered with the latter project. According to Cotton Mather, Comenius was asked by Winthrop to be the President of Harvard University. The Winthrop in question was more plausibly John Winthrop the Younger than his father, since Winthrop junior was in England. However, instead Comenius moved in 1642 to Sweden. to work with Queen Christina (reigned 1632–1654) and the chancellor Axel Oxenstierna (in office 1612–1654) at the task of reorganizing the Swedish schools. The same year he then moved to Elbląg (Elbing) in Poland and in 1648 to England, this time with the assistance of Samuel Hartlib, who came originally from Elbląg. In 1650 Zsuzsanna Lorántffy, widow of George I Rákóczi Prince of Transylvania invited Comenius to Sárospatak. There he remained as a professor at the first Hungarian Protestant College until 1654, writing some of his most important works in this period.

Comenius subsequently returned to Leszno. During the Deluge in 1655, he declared his support for the Protestant Swedish side, prompting Polish Catholic partisans in 1656 to burn his house, his manuscripts, and the school's printing press. The manuscript of Pansophia was destroyed in the fire. From Leszno he fled to take refuge in Amsterdam in the Netherlands. He lived in the Huis met de Hoofden and taught his grandson Johann Theodor Jablonski as well as the young patricians Pieter de Graeff and Nicolaas Witsen.

In 1659, Comenius produced a new edition of the 1618 Bohemian Brethren hymnal, Kancionál, to jest kniha žalmů a písní duchovních containing 606 texts and 406 melodies. In addition to addressing the psalms and hymns, his revision greatly expanded the number of hymns and added a new introduction. This edition was reissued several times into the nineteenth century. His texts in Czech were notable poetic compositions, but he used tunes from other sources. He also edited the German hymnal Kirchen-, Haus- und Hertzens-Musica (Amsterdam, 1661), which had been published under the title Kirchengesänge since 1566. In other writings, Comenius addresses both instrumental and vocal music in many places, although he dedicated no treatise to the topic. Sometimes he follows the medieval mathematical conception of music, but in other places he links music with grammar, rhetoric, and politics. Musical practice, both instrumental and vocal, played an important role in his system of education.

It was in Amsterdam that Comenius would die, in 1670. For unknown reasons he was buried in Naarden, where visitors can see his grave in the mausoleum, located in the Kloosterstraat, devoted to him. Next to the mausoleum is the Comenius Museum.

== Educational influence ==
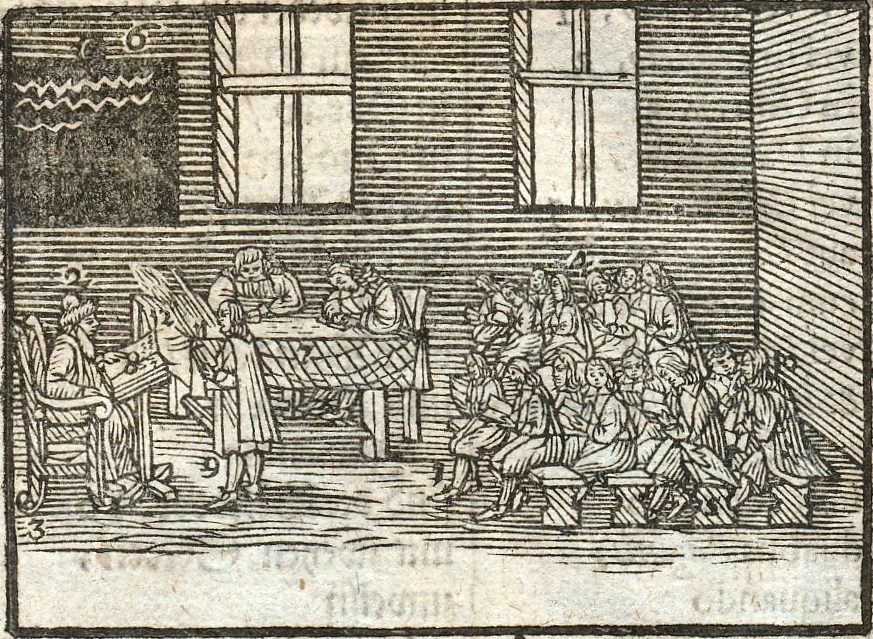
Latin class from Orbis Pictus

For the greater part of the eighteenth century and early part of the nineteenth, there was little recognition of his relationship to the advance in educational thought and practice. However, the importance of the Comenian influence in education has been recognized since the middle of the nineteenth century. The practical educational influence of Comenius was threefold.

He was first a teacher and an organizer of schools, not only among his own people, but later in Sweden, and to a slight extent in Holland. In his Didactica Magna (Great Didactic), he outlined a system of schools that is the exact counterpart of the existing American system of kindergarten, elementary school, secondary school, college, and university.

The second influence was in formulating the general theory of education. In this respect, he is the forerunner of Rousseau, Pestalozzi, Fröbel, etc., and is the first to formulate the idea of "education according to nature," which became consequential during the latter part of the eighteenth and early part of the nineteenth century. The influence of Comenius on education is comparable with that of his contemporaries, Bacon and Descartes, on science and philosophy. In fact, he was largely influenced by the works of these two men. This comparison is largely due to the fact that he first applied or attempted to apply in a systematic manner the principles of thought and investigation, newly formulated by those philosophers, to the organization of education in all its aspects. The summary of this attempt is given in the Didactica Magna, completed about 1631, though not published until several years later.

The third aspect of influence was on the subject matter and method of education, exerted through a series of textbooks of an entirely new nature. The first-published of these was the Janua Linguarum Reserata (The Gate of Tongues Unlocked), issued in 1631. This was followed by a more elementary text, the Vestibulum, a more advanced one, the Atrium, and others. The Orbis Pictus, published in 1658, became one of the most renowned and widely circulated school books over the next century. It was also the first successful application of illustrations to the work of teaching youth (though not the first illustrated book for children, per se).

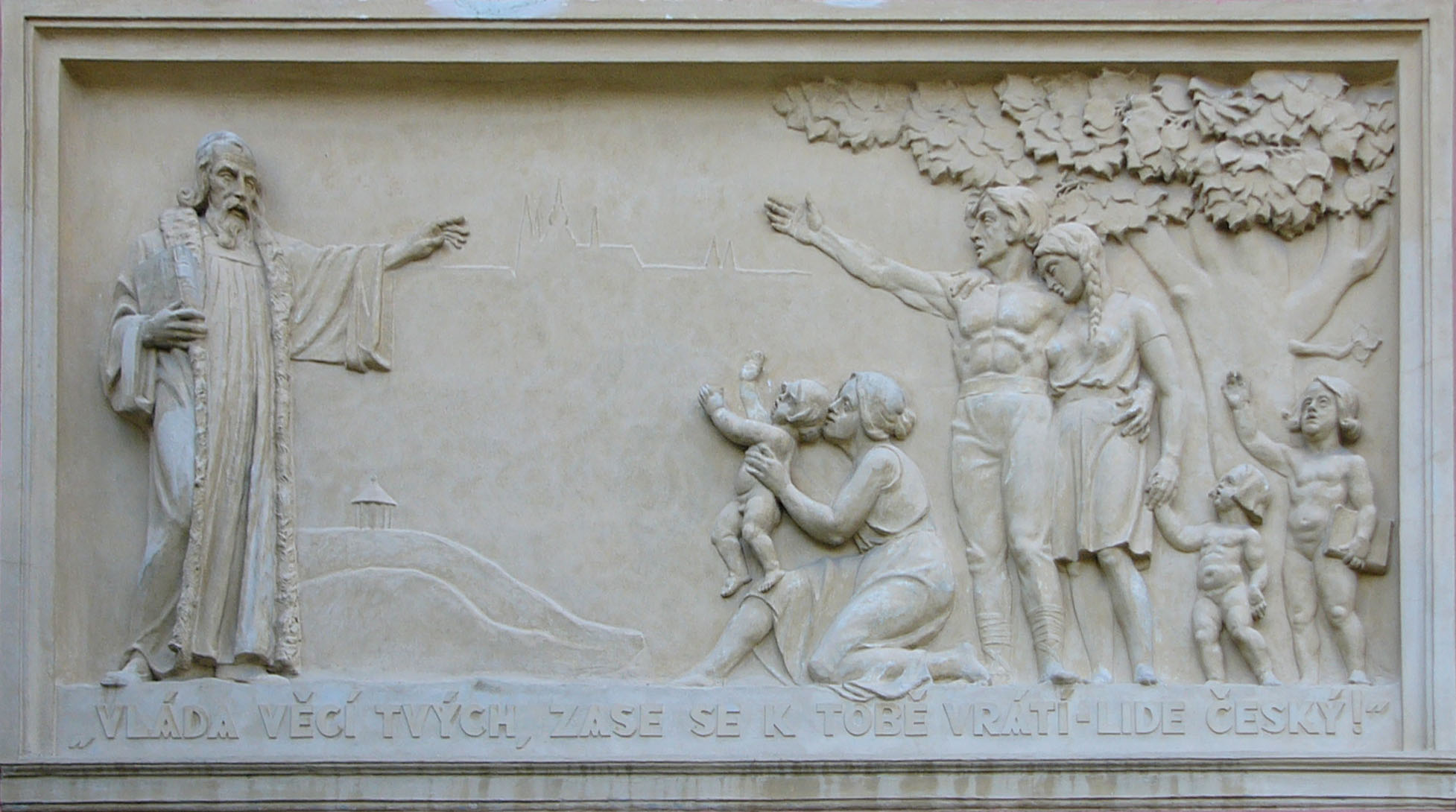
Relief of Comenius in Dolany, Czech Republic

The educational writings of Comenius comprise more than forty titles. These texts were all based on the same fundamental ideas: (1) learning foreign languages through the vernacular; (2) obtaining ideas through objects rather than words; (3) starting with objects most familiar to the child to introduce him to both the new language and the more remote world of objects; (4) giving the child a comprehensive knowledge of his environment, physical and social, as well as instruction in religious, moral, and classical subjects; (5) making this acquisition of a compendium of knowledge a pleasure rather than a task; and (6) making instruction universal "to all men and from all points of view".

== Theology ==
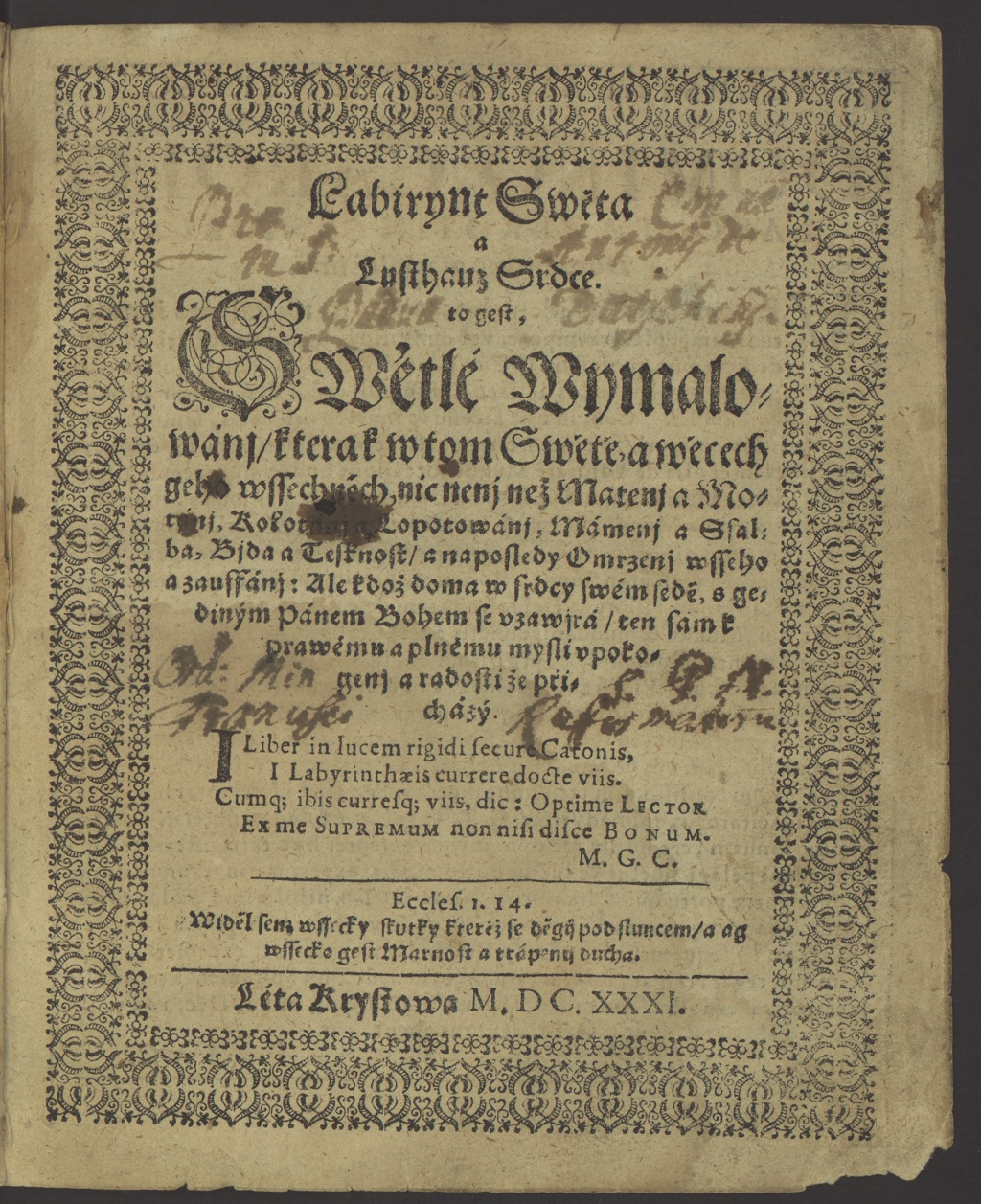
Labyrinth of the World and Paradise of the Heart by Comenius.

John Amos Comenius was a bishop of the Unity of the Brethren church that had its roots in the teaching of Czech reformer Jan Hus. One of his most famous theological works is the Labyrinth of the World and Paradise of the Heart. The book represents his thinking about the world being full of various useless things and complex labyrinths, and that the true peace of mind and soul can be found only in one's heart where Christ the Saviour should dwell and rule. This teaching is also repeated in one of his last works, Unum Necessarium (Only One is Needed), where he shows various labyrinths and problems in the world and provides simple solutions to various situations. In this book he also admits that his former believing in prophecies and revelations of those days was his personal labyrinth where he got lost many times. He was greatly influenced by Boehme.

In his Synopsis physicae ad lumen divinum reformatae, Comenius gives a physical theory of his own, said to be taken from the Book of Genesis. He was also famous for his prophecies and the support he gave to visionaries. In his Lux in tenebris he published the visions of Christopher Kotterus, Mikuláš Drabík (lat. Nicolaus Drabicius) and Kristina Poniatowska. Attempting to interpret the Book of Revelation, he promised the millennium in 1672 and guaranteed miraculous assistance to those who would undertake the destruction of the Pope and the house of Austria, even venturing to prophesy that Oliver Cromwell, Gustavus Adolphus, and George I Rákóczi, prince of Transylvania, would perform the task. He also wrote to Louis XIV of France, informing him that the empire of the world should be his reward if he would overthrow the enemies of God.But, paradoxically he is quoted as having said: "We are all citizens of the world, we are all of one blood. To hate a man because he was born in another country, because he speaks a different language, or because he takes a different view on this subject or that, is a great folly...let us put aside all selfishness in the consideration of language, nationality, or religion."

== Family ==
One of his daughters, Elisabeth, married Peter Figulus from Jablonné nad Orlicí. Their son, Daniel Ernst Jablonski (1660–1741), Comenius's grandson, later went to Berlin in 1693; there he became the highest official pastor at the court of King Frederick I of Prussia (reigned 1701–1713). There he became acquainted with Count Nicolaus Ludwig Zinzendorf (1700–1760). Zinzendorf was among the foremost successors to Comenius as a bishop (1737–1760) in the renewed Moravian Brethren's Church. His direct descendent, Jan Ferdinand Kallik (1939-____) was born in Prague and educated in South Africa. He now lives in California. All four of his children, Lynette, Peter, Alison, and Pamela are teachers.

== Legacy ==
The Comenius Medal, a UNESCO award honouring outstanding achievements in the fields of education research and innovation, commemorates Comenius. Peter Drucker hailed Comenius as the inventor of textbooks and primers.

=== Czech Republic ===
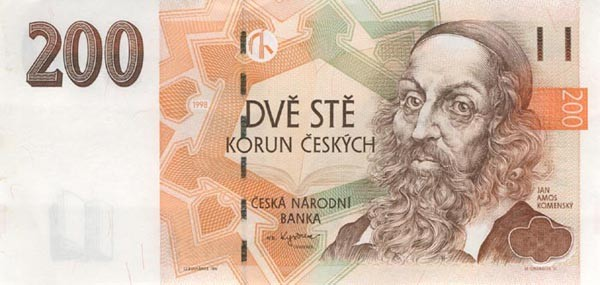
Czech koruna banknote depicting Comenius

During the 19th-century Czech National Revival, Czechs idealised Comenius as a symbol of the Czech nation. This image persists to the present day.

The Czech Republic celebrates 28 March, the birthday of Comenius, as Teachers' Day. The University of Jan Amos Komenský was founded in Prague in 2001, offering bachelor's, master's and graduate degree programmes. Gate to Languages, a project of lifelong education, taking place in the Czech Republic from October 2005 to June 2007 and aimed at language education of teachers, was named after his book Janua linguarum reserata (Gate to Languages Unlocked). Comenius is pictured on the 200 Czech koruna banknote.

Asteroid 1861 Komenský, discovered by Luboš Kohoutek, is named in his honor.

=== Elsewhere in Europe ===
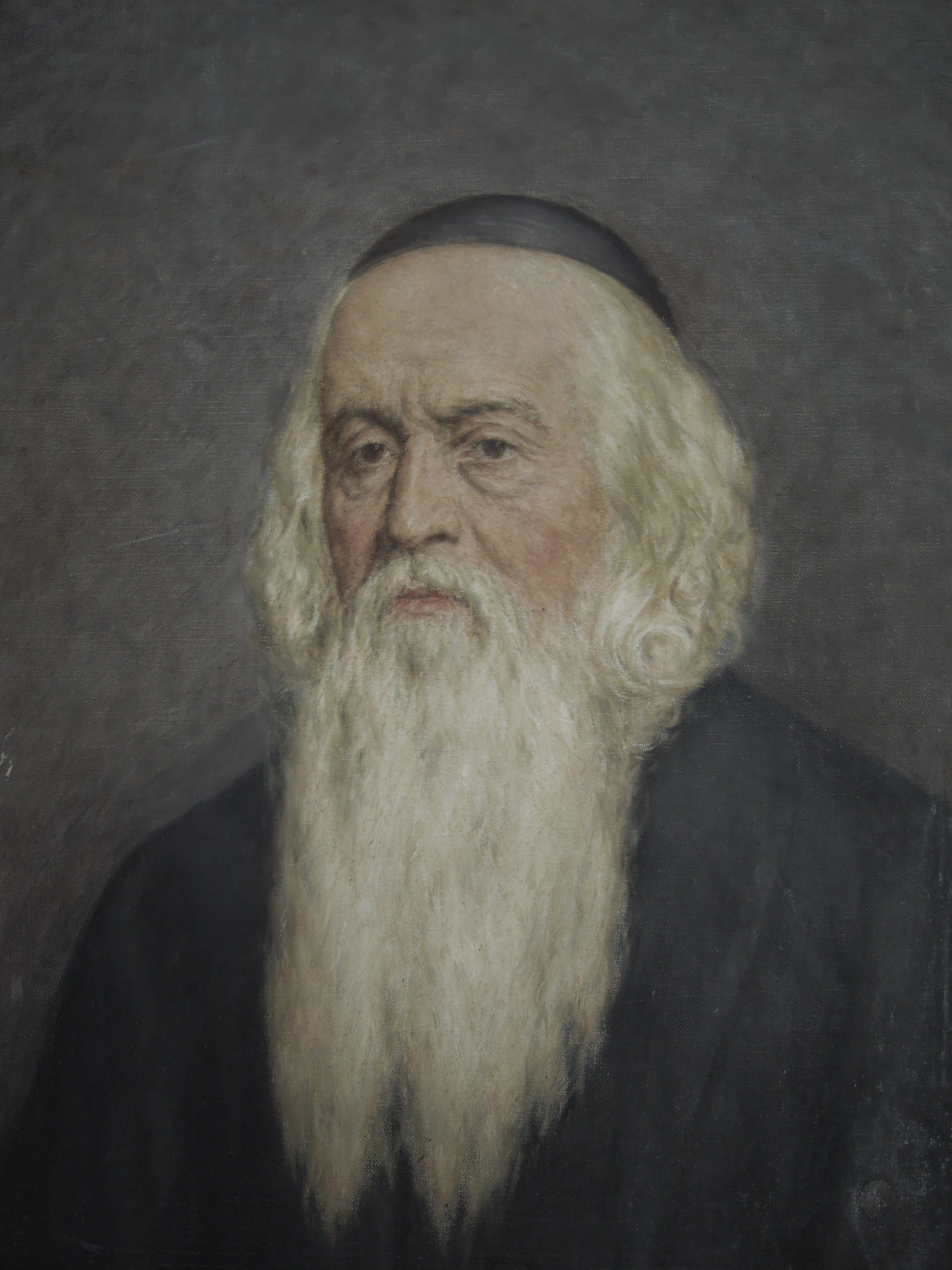
Portrait of Comenius by the Slovak painter Karol Miloslav Lehotský

In Leszno, Poland, a local college is named after him. There is also square of his name nearby post Unity's of the Brethren church. In Poland, the Comenius Foundation is a non-governmental organisation dedicated to the provision of equal opportunities to children under 10 years of age.

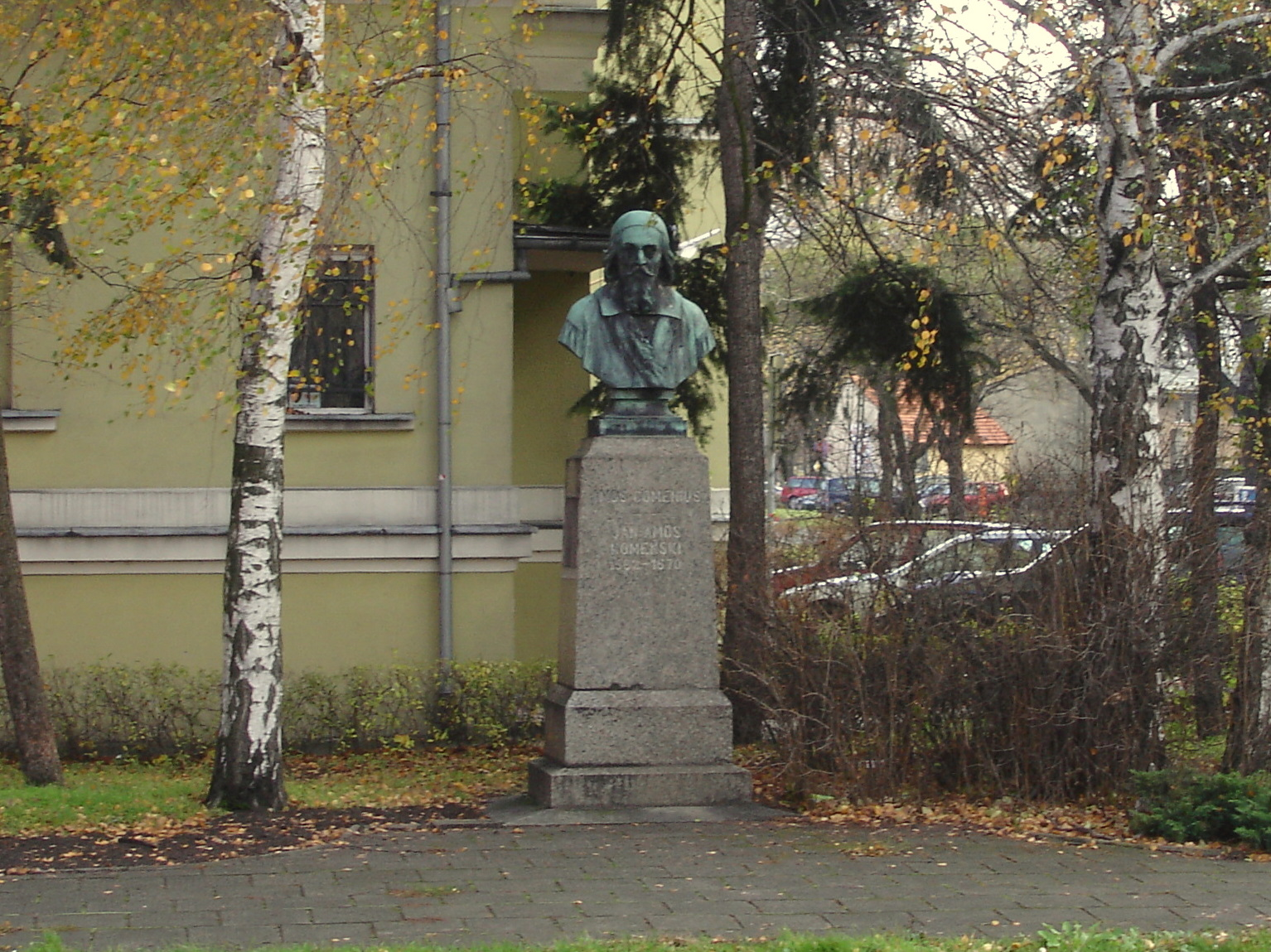
Monument of Comenius in Leszno on the square named after him.

In Sárospatak, Hungary, a teacher's college is named after him, which belongs to the University of Miskolc. Comenius' name has been given to primary schools in several German cities, including Bonn, Grafing, and Deggendorf. In Skopje, North Macedonia the Czechoslovak government built a school after a catastrophic 1963 earthquake and named it after Comenius (Jan Amos Komenski in Macedonian). In 1919 Comenius University was founded by an act of parliament in Bratislava, Czechoslovakia, now in Slovakia. It was the first university with courses in Slovak.

The Comenius tower in Luxembourg was completed in 2008 as an addition to the headquarters of the Court of Justice of the European Union. The building houses many of the institution's translation services.

The Italian film director Roberto Rossellini took Comenius, and especially his theory of "direct vision", as his model in the development of his didactic theories, which Rossellini hoped would usher the world into a utopian future.

Comenius is a European Union school partnership program. In the United Kingdom, the University of Sheffield's Western Bank Library holds the largest collection of Comenius manuscripts outside of the Czech Republic.

He is commemorated in the Calendar of Saints of the Evangelical Church in Germany on 16 November.

=== United States ===
In 1892, educators in many places celebrated the 300th anniversary of Comenius. Comenius Hall was built as the principal classroom and faculty office building on Moravian College's campus in Pennsylvania, and the Comenian Society for the study and publication of his works was formed. The education department at Salem College in North Carolina has an annual Comenius Symposium dedicated in his honor; the subjects usually deal with modern issues in education. The Comenius Foundation is a non-profit 501(c)(3) charity which uses film and documentary production to further faith, learning, and love. Many of his musical creations have been preserved within the Moravian music foundation in North Carolina.

== Works ==
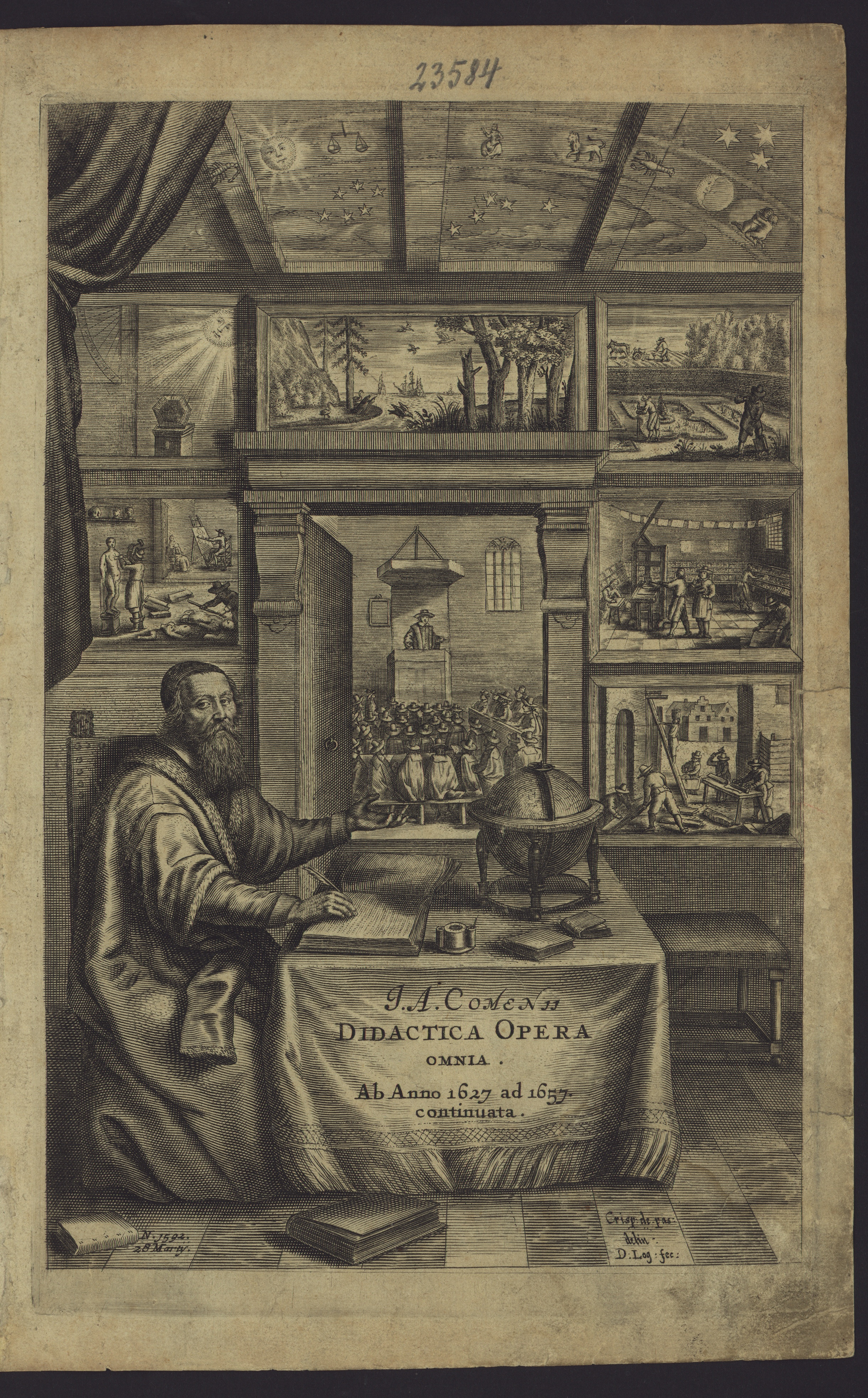
A collection of didactics, 1657

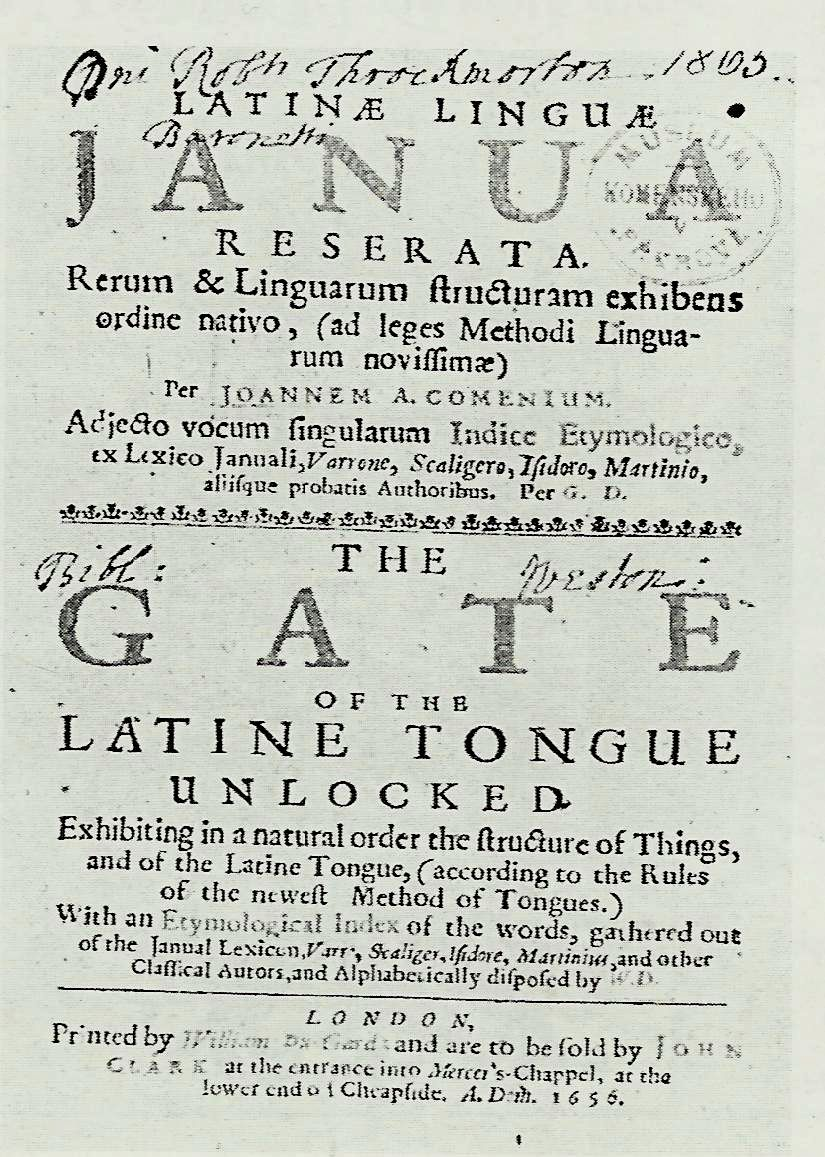
English edition of Janua linguarum reserata, 1631

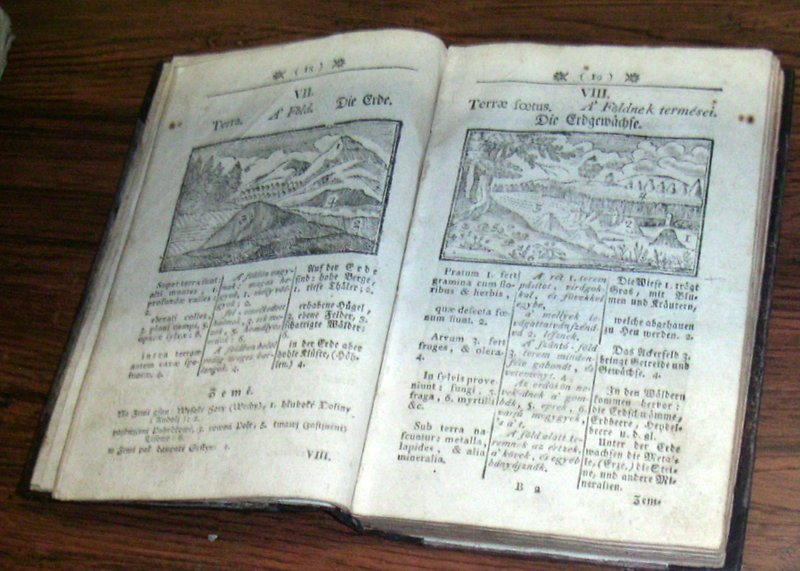
Orbis Pictus textbook for children, 1658

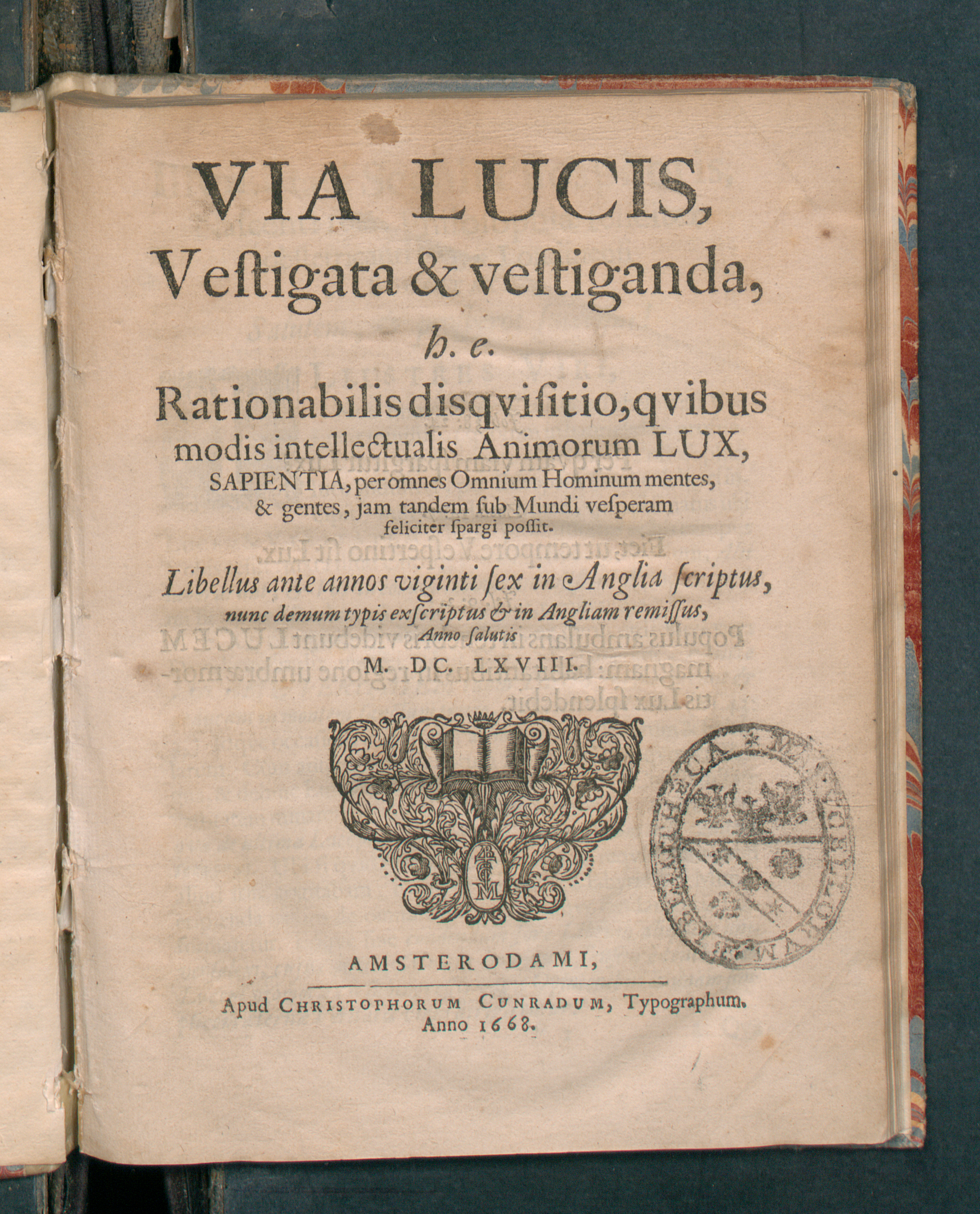
Via Lucis, 1668

=== Latin ===
- Linguae Bohemicae thesaurus, hoc est lexicon plenissimum, grammatica accurata, idiotismorum elegantiae et emphases adagiaque ("Treasure of the Czech language"), 1612–1656
- Problemata miscellanea ("Different Problems"), 1612, non-existent, perished in fire while being prepared for printing.
- Sylloge quaestionum controversarum, 1613
- Grammaticae facilioris praecepta, 1614–1616
- Theatrum universitatis rerum, 1616–1627
- Centrum securitatis ("The Center of Safety"), 1625
- Moraviae nova et post omnes priores accuratissima delineatio autore J. A. Comenio ("Map of Moravia"), 1618–1627
- Janua linguarum reserata, 1631
- Didactica magna ("The Great Didactic"), 1633–1638
- Via Lucis, Vestigata & Vestiganda ("The Way of Light"), 1641
- Januae Lingvarum Reseratae Aureae Vestibulum quo primus ad Latinam aditus Tyrunculis paratur ("Introduction to Latin"), 1648
- Schola pansophica ("School of Pansophy"), 1650–1651
- Primitiae laborum scholasticorum, 1650–1651
- Eruditionis scholasticae janua, rerum & linguarum structuram externam exhibens, 1656, doi:10.3931/e-rara-79809 (Digitized edition at e-rara).
- Opera didactica omnia ("Writing on All Learning"), 1657
- Orbis Pictus ("The Visible World in Pictures"), 1658
- Gentis Felicitas (1659)
- De bono unitatis et ordinis ("On Good Unity and Order"), 1660
- De rerum humanarum emendatione consultatio catholica ("General Consultation on an Improvement of All Things Human"), 1666
- Unum necessarium ("The One Thing Needful"), 1668
- Spicilegium Didacticum, 1680

=== Czech ===
- O andělích ("About Angels"), 1615
- Retuňk proti Antikristu a svodům jeho ("Utterance against the Antichrist and his temptations"), 1617
- O starožitnostech Moravy ("About Moravian Antiquities"), 1618–1621
- Spis o rodu Žerotínů (Script about the Zierotin family), 1618–1621
- Listové do nebe ("Letters to Heaven"), 1619
- Manuálník aneb jádro celé biblí svaté ("Manual or Core of the Whole Holy Bible"), 1620–1623
- Přemyšlování o dokonalosti kŕesťanské ("Thinking About Christian Perfection"), 1622
- Nedobytedlný hrad jméno Hospodinovo ("Unconqerable Fortress (is) Name of the God"), 1622
- Truchlivý, díl první ("The Mournful", volume I), 1623
- O poezí české ("About Czech Poetry"), 1623–1626
- Truchlivý, díl druhý ("The Mournful", volume II), 1624
- O sirobě ("About Poor People"), 1624
- Pres boží ("Press of God"), 1624
- Vidění a zjevení Kryštofa Kottera, souseda a jircháře sprotavského ("Seeing and Revelation of Kryštof Kotter, Neibourgh of Mine and Tanner from Sprotava"), 1625
- Překlad některých žalmů ("Translation of Some Psalms"), 1626
- Didaktika česká ("Czech Didactic"), 1628–1630
- Škola hrou (Schola Ludus, "School by Play") 1630
- Labyrint světa a ráj srdce ("Labyrinth of the World and Paradise of the Heart") 1631
- Trouba milostivého léta pro národ český ("The Horn of the Year of Jubilee for Czech Nation"), 1631–1632
- Informatorium školy mateřské (School of Infancy), 1632
- Brána jazyků otevřená (The Gate of Languages Unlocked) 1633
- Orbis Pictus, 1658

== See also ==
- Moravian College
- Didactic method
- Comeniology
