= Great Didactic =

Book by John Amos Comenius

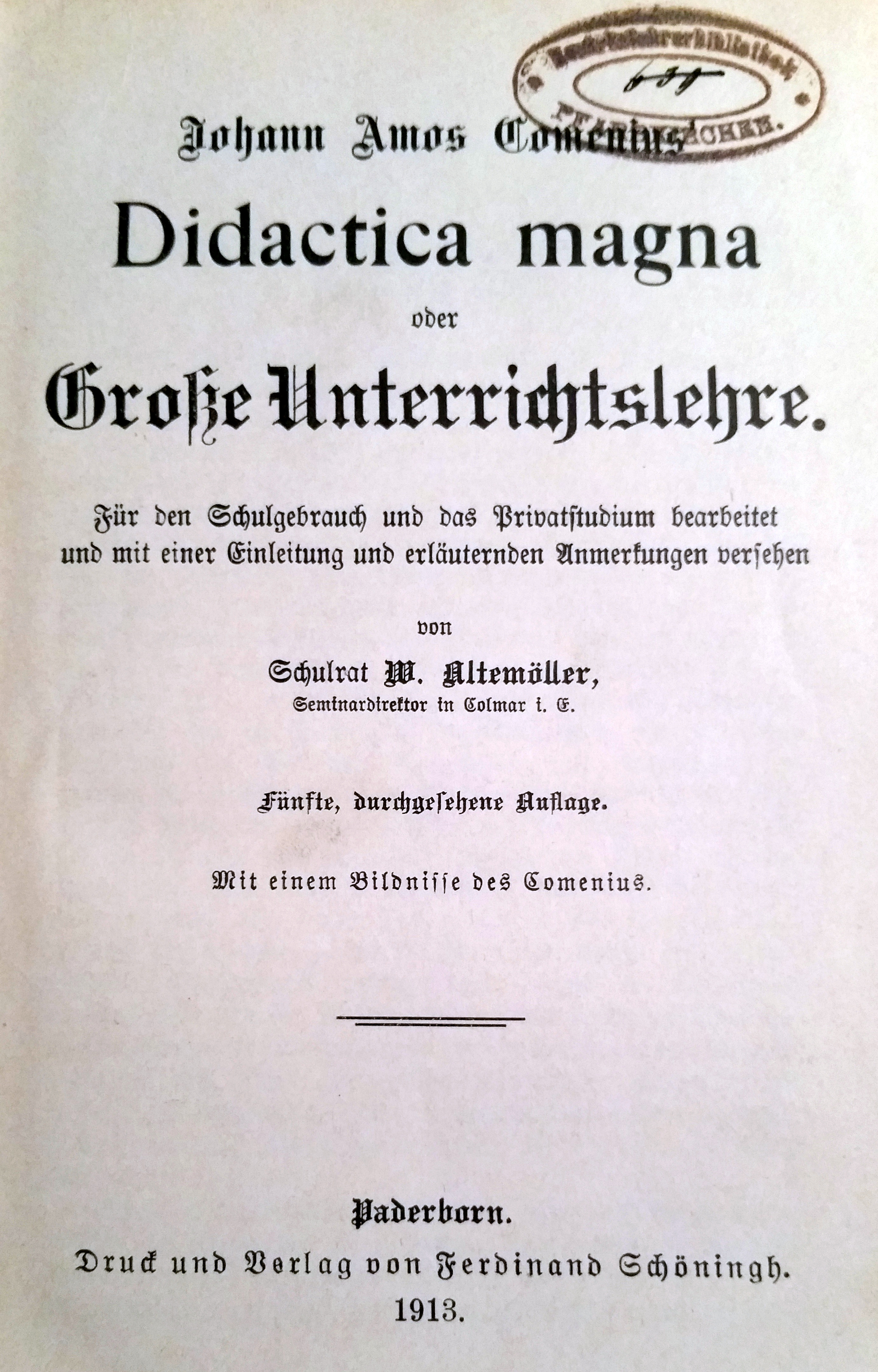
Didactica Magna - 1918

The Great Didactic or (Latin: Didactica Magna), full title (Latin: Didactica Magna, Universale Omnes Omnia Docendi Artificium Exhibens), The Great Didactic, The Whole Art of Teaching all Things to all Man, is a book written by Czech philosopher, pedagogue and theologian, John Amos Comenius between 1627 and 1638 and first published in 1657.

== Summary ==
The Great Didactic is commonly referred as the first great work of pedagogy (education) at all. Its author, John Amos Comenius, described his work as a "didactic of life", the aim of which was "to teach everyone everything completely" or "to teach everyone everything in consideration of the whole" (Latin: omnes omnia omnino excoli). The background to this high claim is the contemporary view that only an educated person is a human being. Comenius thus represented an approach of optimistic anthropology, which sees something good in every human being and generally considers this to be expandable (educational). Parallel to this, the Didactica Magna serve as a guide to achieve a high learning outcome for the students in a pleasant learning atmosphere.

John Amos Comenius in his Didactica Magna (Great Didactic), outlined a system of schools that is the exact counterpart of the existing American system of kindergarten, elementary school, secondary school, college, and university. The book forwards a philosophy of teaching called pansophism (universal knowledge) whose aim it is to teach all things to all people from all points of view. Comenius believed that humankind through pansophic teachings could live in harmony. He presumed that children have a natural craving for knowledge and goodness. In Comenius's words:

We venture to promise a Great Didactic ... the whole art of teaching all things to all men, and indeed of teaching them with certainty, so that the result cannot fail to follow… Lastly, we wish to prove all this a priori, that is to say, from the unalterable nature of the universal art of founding universal schools.

— Comenius (1896, p.157).

In the Great Didactic, he stated:

“ ... not the children of the rich or of the powerful only, but of all alike, boys and girls, both noble and ignoble, rich and poor, in all cities and towns, villages and hamlets, should be sent to school.”

— Comenius (1896, p.218).

In The Great Didactic Comenius recommended learning from nature too, outside school contexts. If a child is in a school, he argued that learning should extend beyond the classroom and take place in everyday life. He accomplished this acquisition of worldly knowledge by giving students contact with objects in the environment and systematizing knowledge to make it more accessible and relevant to the children's interests and life needs.

== See also ==
- Comeniology
- Moravian College
- Orbis Sensualum Pictus
- Janua linguarum reserata
- Labyrinth of the World and Paradise of the Heart
