= Orbis Pictus =

Book by Jan Amos Comenius

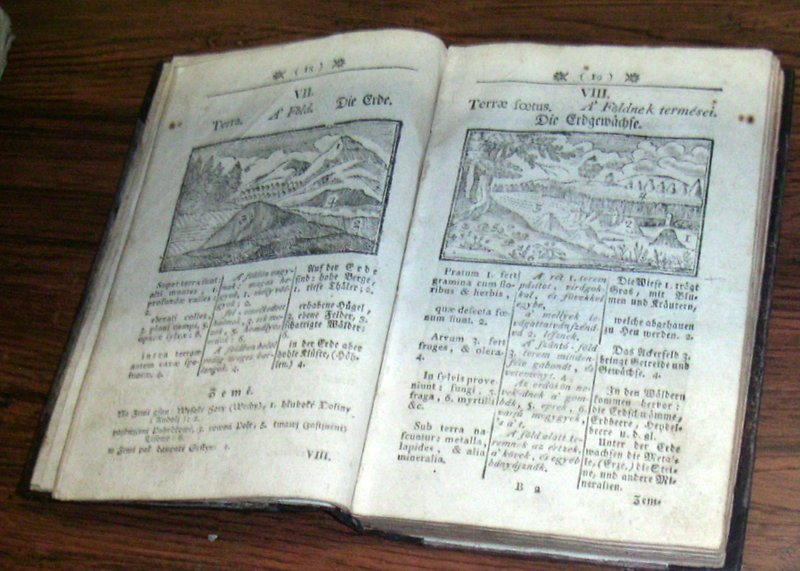
A late 18th-century reprint of Orbis Pictus, published in Pressburg/Pozsony, Kingdom of Hungary. This edition is in four languages: Latin, Hungarian, German and Czech)

Orbis Pictus, or Orbis Sensualium Pictus (Visible World in Pictures), is a textbook for children written by the Czech educator John Amos Comenius and published in 1658. It was the first widely used children's textbook with pictures, published first in Latin and German and later republished in many European languages. It has been described as "probably the first purpose-made children's picturebook". The revolutionary book quickly spread around Europe and became the defining children's textbook for centuries.

The book was published in Nuremberg and was initially used as a textbook for German schools. The first English translation was published in 1659, followed by French and Italian translations in 1666, and Czech and Hungarian translations in 1685. The textbook was a precursor of both audio-visual techniques and the lexical approach in language learning.

== Contents ==
The book is divided into chapters illustrated by copperplate prints, which are described in the accompanying text. In most editions, the text is given in both Latin and the child's native language. The book has 150 chapters and covers a wide range of subjects:

- inanimate nature
- botanics
- zoology
- religion
- humans and their activities

== History ==
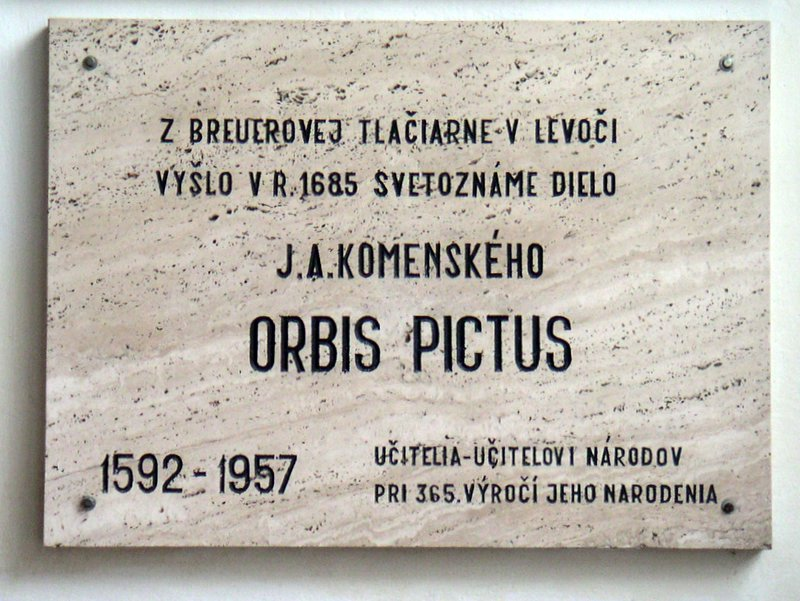
Plaque commemorating the publication of Orbis Pictus in Levoča

Originally published in Latin and German in 1658 in Nuremberg, the book soon spread to schools in Germany and other countries. The first English edition by Charles Hoole was published in 1659. The first quadrilingual edition (in Latin, German, Italian and French) was published in 1666. The first Czech translation was published in the 1685 quadrilingual edition (together with Latin, German and Hungarian), by the Breuer publishing house in Lőcse (today Levoča, Slovakia). In the years 1670 to 1780, new editions were published in various languages, with both the pictures and text content being improved.

Orbis Pictus had a long-lasting influence on children's education. It was a precursor of both audio-visual techniques and the lexical approach in language learning.

In 1930 Otto Neurath claimed that images in Gesellschaft und Wirtschaft constituted a new Orbis Pictus.

== See also ==
- Comenius
- Comeniology
- Great Didactic
