= William Weekly =

English bookseller (c.1629–1697)

William Weekly (c. 1629–1697) was a bookseller who settled in Ipswich in the seventeenth century after completing an apprenticeship in London.

He was originally from Great Addington, Northamptonshire. He served his apprenticeship from September 1638 to November 1646. In 1651 he gained the freedom of Ipswich. He served as Chamberlain for Ipswich Corporation with Richard Clopton, 1656-7.

His son, John Weekly (1663-1716) entered his apprenticeship of ten years in London with William Harris. He returned to Ipswich, residing in St Lawrence ward.

== Publications ==
Weekly published a number of books and other publications:

- (1650) The good masters plea, against the evill servants cavill by Nicholas Stanton, late preacher at St Margaret's Church, Ipswich
- (1657) The universal character, by which all the nations in the world may understand one anothers conceptions by Cave Beck, Ipswich Town Preacher, printed by Thomas Maxey
- (1657) Use and Practice of Faith by Matthew Lawrence printed by Anne Maxey, (widow of Thomas Maxey)
- (1657) Mishʻam A stay in trouble or The saints rest in the evil day by Alexander Pringle of Harwich, printed by Anne Maxey
- (1660) The Best Wisdome by Benjamin Brunning, Ipswich Town Preacher, printed by D. Maxwell
