= Town Library of Ipswich =

Municipal library in Ipswich, England

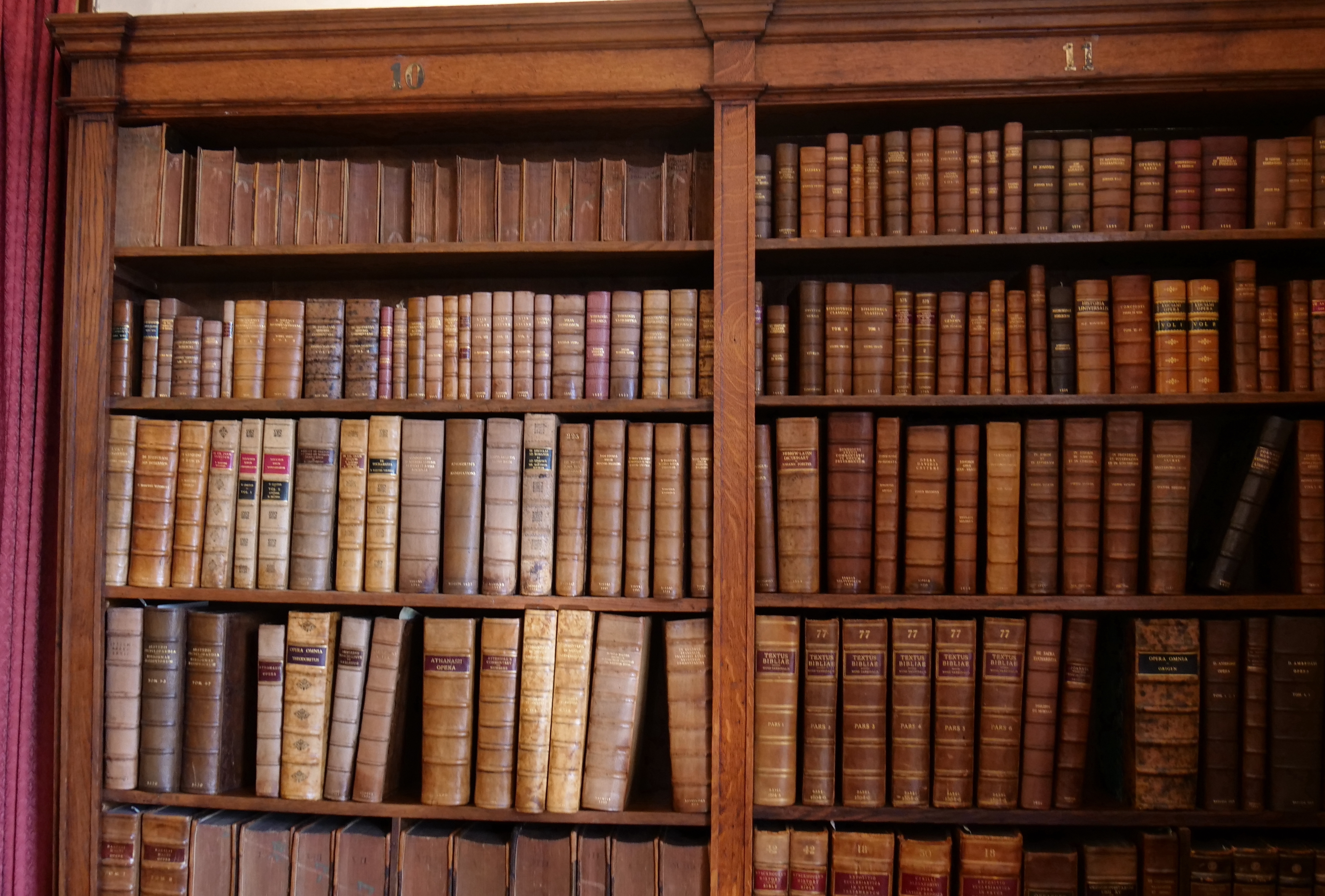
- Bookcases of the Town Library of Ipswich, 2023
- 52°03′51″N 1°09′06″E
- Location: Ipswich School, England
- Type: Parochial/Municipal
- Established: 1599

Collection
- Items collected: Books published from 1474 to 1760, plus 10 manuscripts. Originally to provide reading material for Town Preacher
- Size: 900

Access and use
- Population served: Historically freemen of Ipswich Corporation
- Parent organization: Ipswich Corporation

The Town Library of Ipswich is a collection of 871 titles organised in 944 volumes published between 1474 and 1760. In addition there are 10 manuscripts. This collection was made by the Ipswich Corporation to provide resources for the Ipswich Town Preacher. It is now located in the headmaster's study at Ipswich School, where they are cared for on behalf of the town. As distinct from the St James Library (now the St Edmundsbury Cathedral Library) which offered more limited access in nearby Bury St Edmunds, it was open to all freemen of the Ipswich Corporation.

== The William Smarte donation ==
The collection was started in 1599 but the first record of a corporation decision to support the library dates to 1610 when they decided to allocate some space in the Grammar School for this purpose. The Ipswich antiquarian Richard Canning wrote in 1747 that William Smarte might be consider the "accidental Founder" of the library as his Latin books were kept in a chest by the Ipswich Corporation until 1612 and then provided an impetus for the corporation to found the library.

== Cave Beck fore-edge shelfmarking system ==
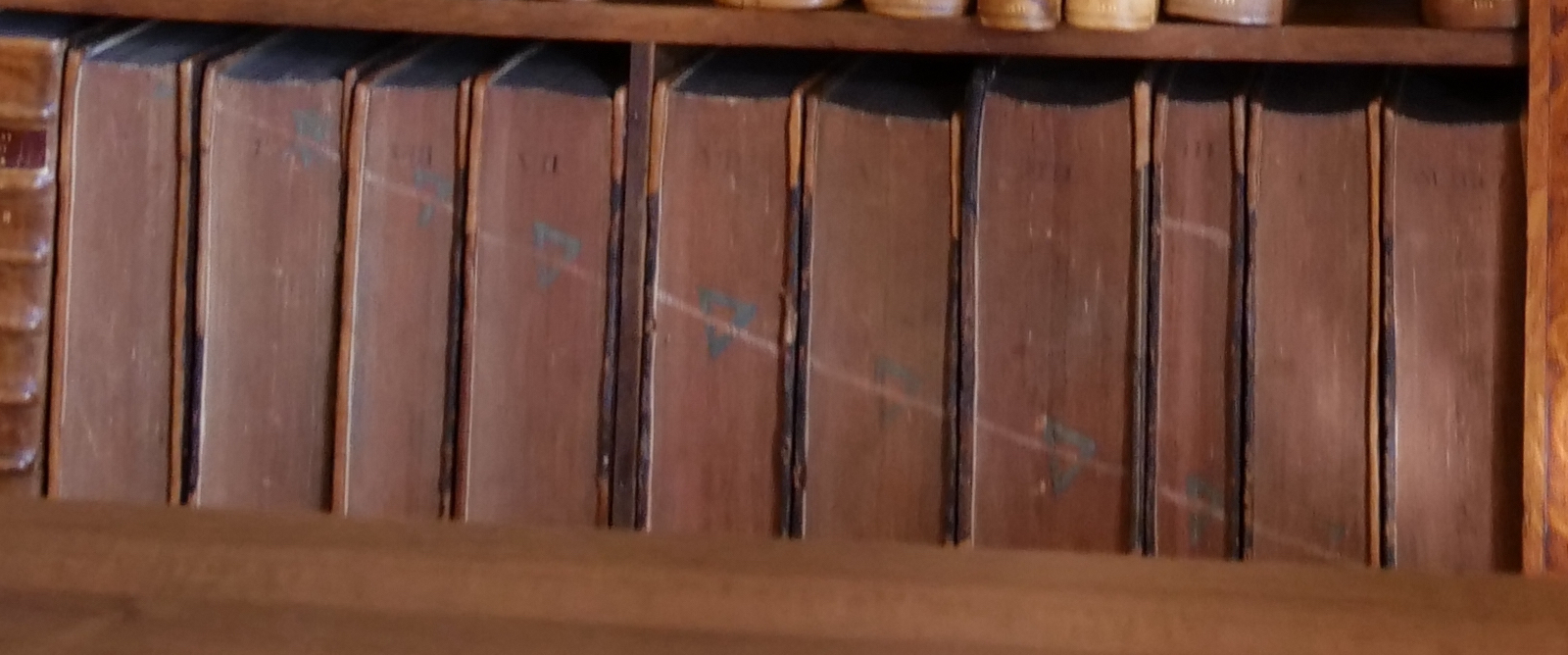
Cave Beck's fore-edge shelfmark system

Cave Beck was appointed Master of the Ipswich Grammar School in 1650. He introduced a fore-edge shelfmarking system and the corporation paid Basil Breame 3 shillings to draw these on many of the books held by the library in April 1651. A diagonal line was drawn across the fore-edge of the books with additional marks to indicate to which shelf the book belonged.

== Some of the books ==
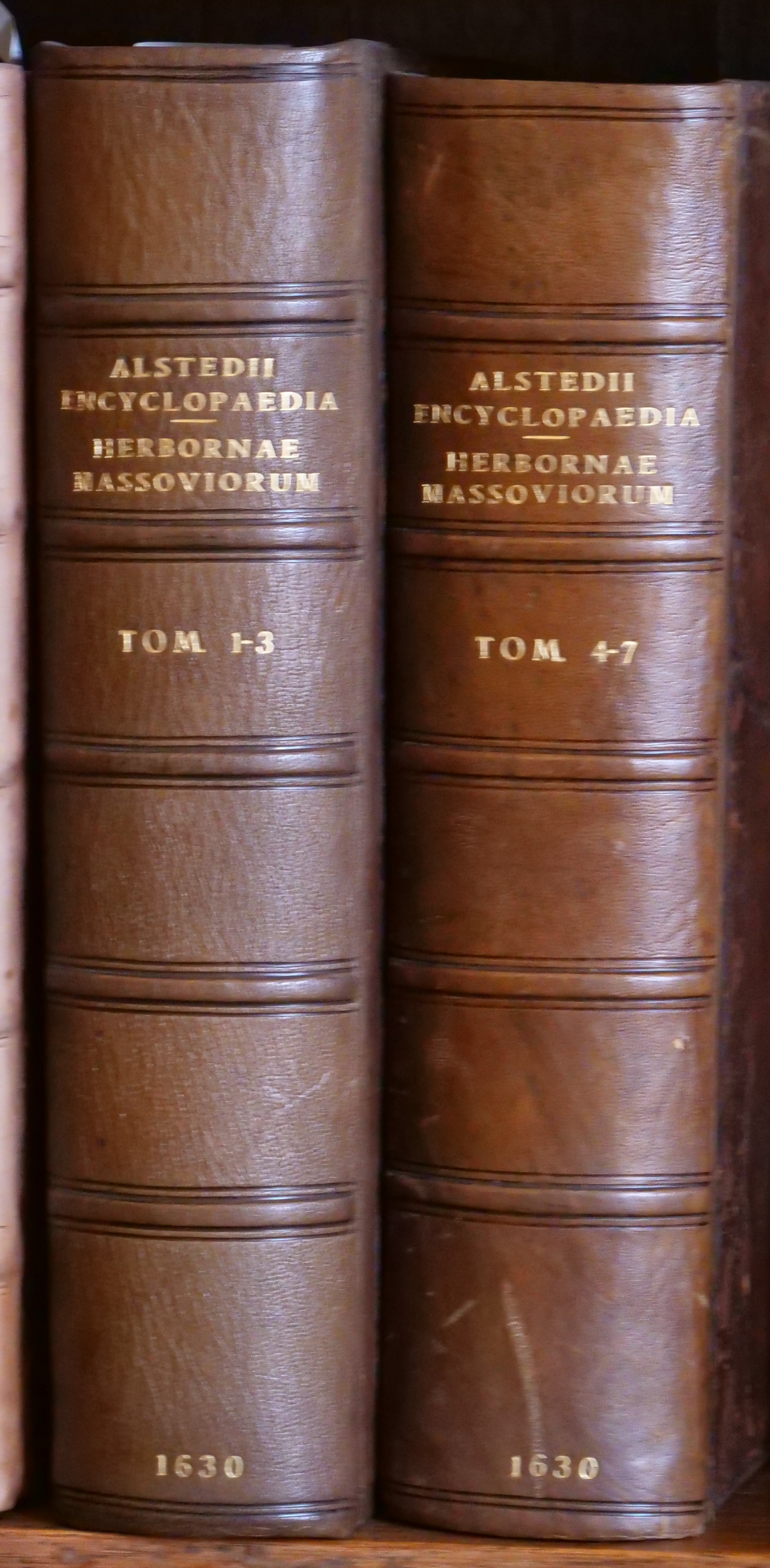
Alsted's Encyclopedia (1630)

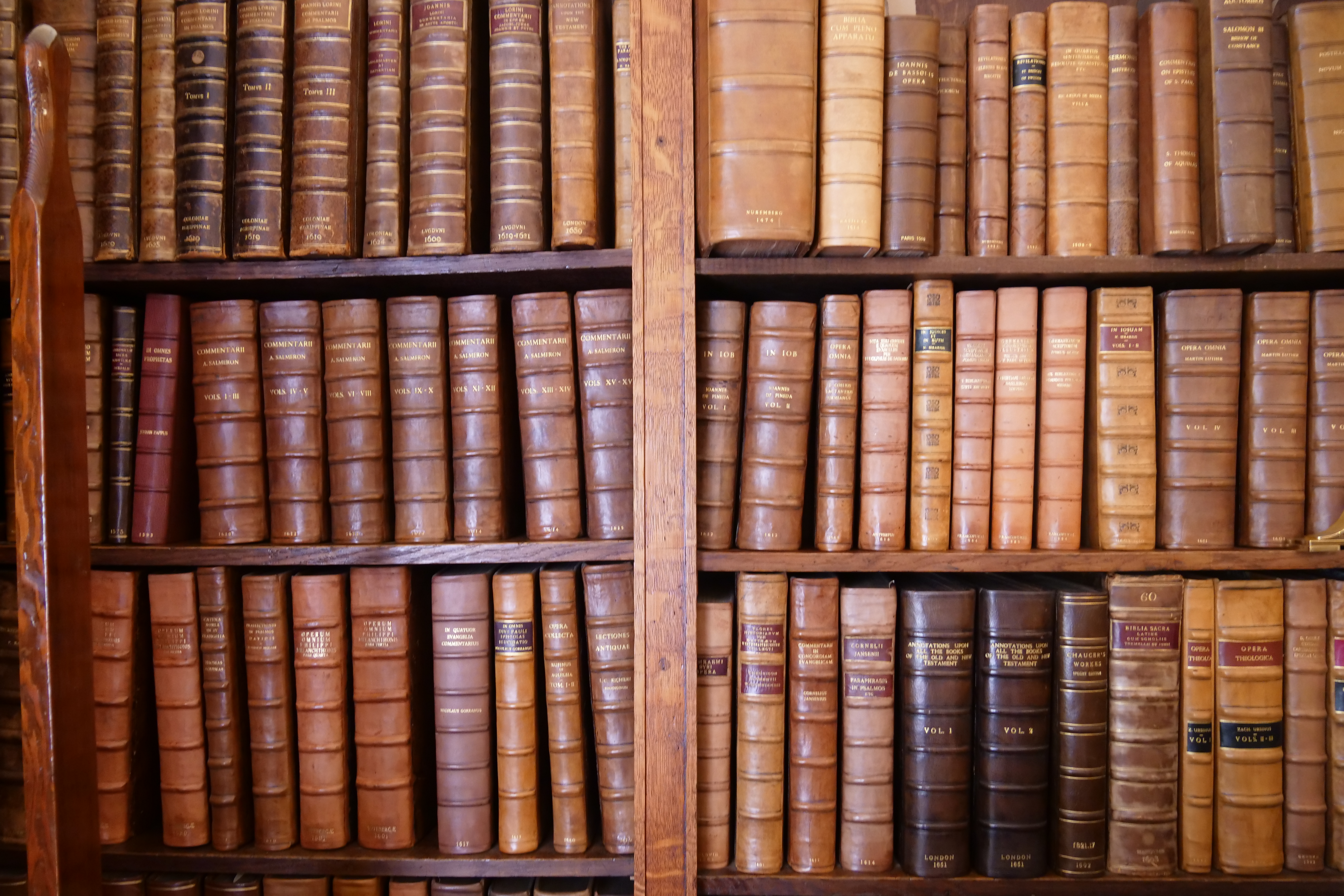
Books spines on shelves

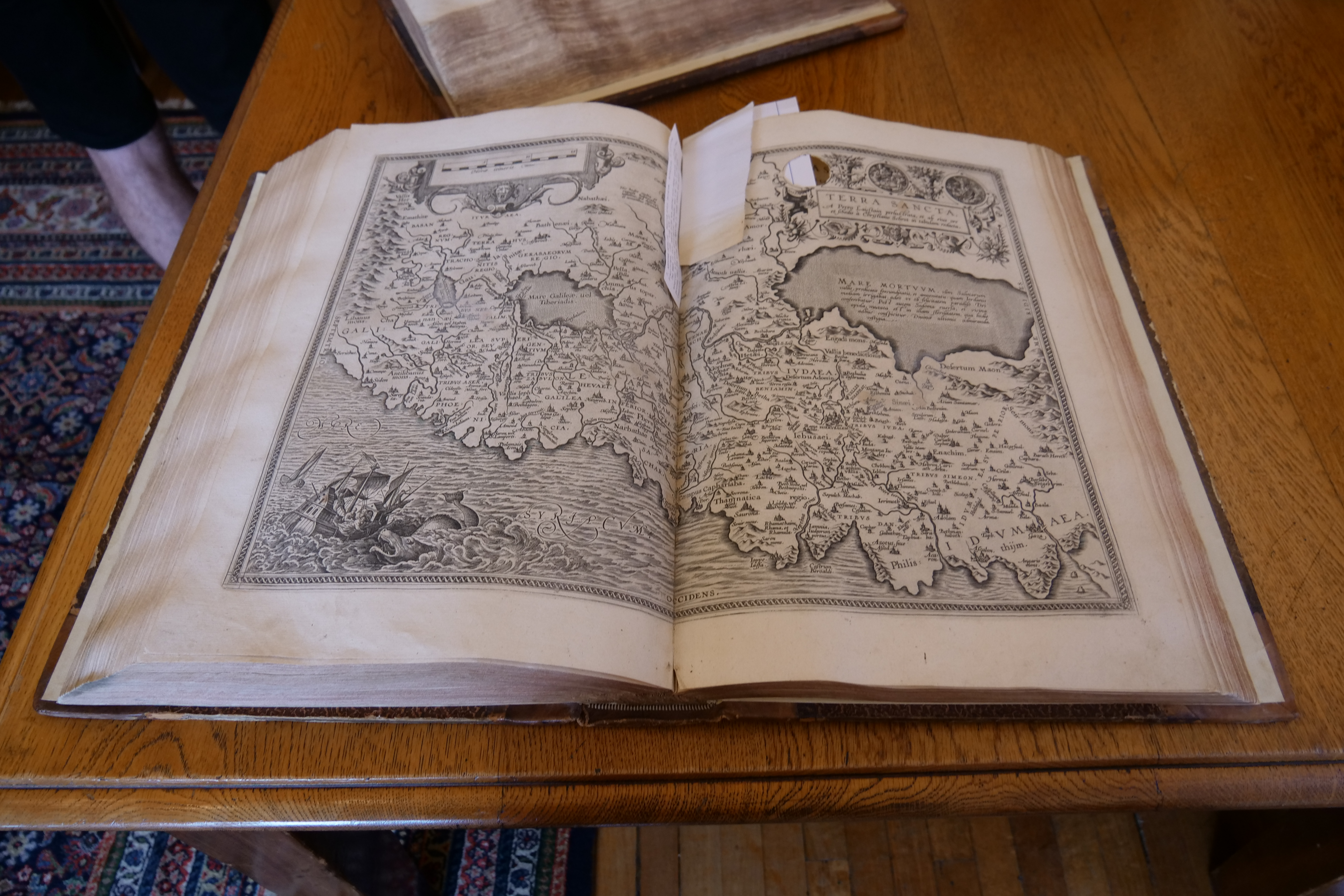
Terra Sancta, map on display

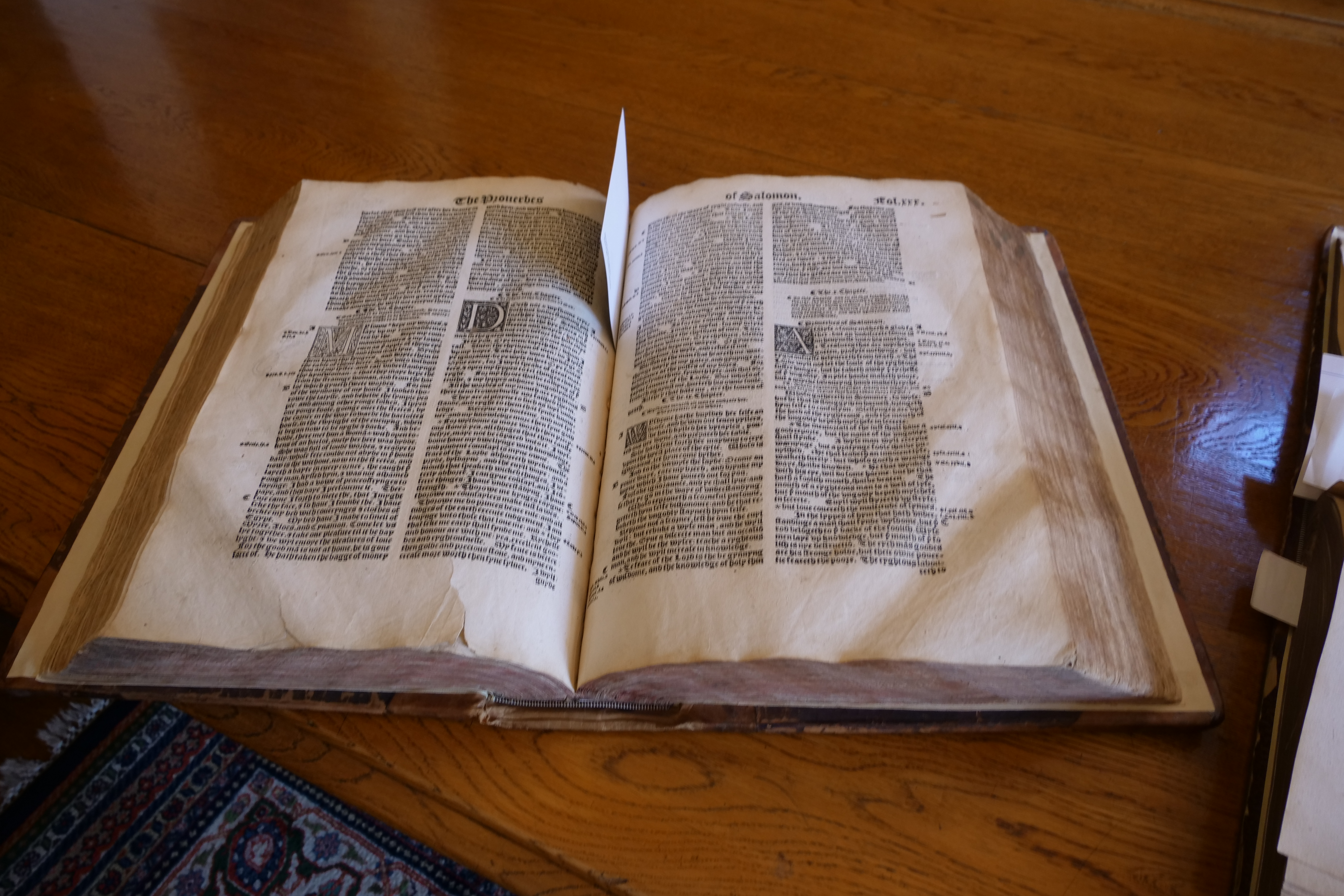
The Proverbs of Salomon
