= David Maxwell (printer) =

English printer

David Maxwell was a prominent English printer active in London in the seventeenth century. After serving his apprenticeship with Thomas Maxey he married Maxey's widow, Anne.

== Books with the David Maxwell imprint ==
- (1659) A True Relation of what passed between Dr. John Dee and some Spirits with Letters of sundry great men to the same, with a Preface by Meric Casaubon, Printed by D. Maxwell for T. Garthwait, and sold at the Little North door of St. Pauls, and by other Stationers.
- (1660) Mercurius veridicus, Weekly journal
  - No.1 29 May-5 June
  - No.2 5 June-12 June
  - No.3 12 June-19 June
- (1660) The Best Wisdome, by Benjamin Brunning, Ipswich Town Preacher, for William Weekly
