= Thomas Maxey =

Thomas Maxey may refer to:

- Thomas Maxey (printer)
- Thomas Sheldon Maxey (1846–1921), American jurist
