= Chilton, Suffolk =

Civil parish in Suffolk, England

Coordinates: 52.046°N 0.753°E

Chilton
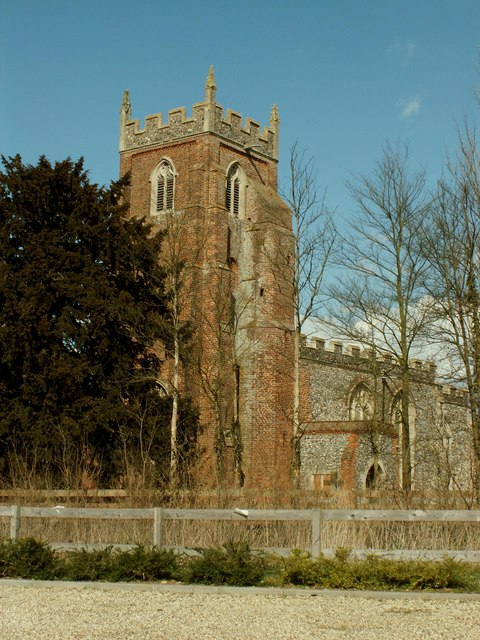
- St Mary's Church

- Location within Suffolk
- Area: 3.49 km^{2} (1.35 sq mi)
- Population: 367 (2011)
  - Density: 105/km^{2} (270/sq mi)
- OS grid reference: TL891429
- Civil parish: Chilton
- District: Babergh
- Shire county: Suffolk
- Region: East
- Country: England
- Sovereign state: United Kingdom
- Post town: Sudbury
- Postcode district: CO10

Chilton is a civil parish on the eastern outskirts of Sudbury, in the Babergh district, in the county of Suffolk, England. In 2011 the parish had a population of 367.

Once a normal village, Chilton today consists of scattered clusters of housing and an isolated Church of St Mary, and is a prime example of a deserted medieval village.

== History ==
Chilton's history dates back to the British Iron Age, when it was founded as a Celtic agricultural settlement. The name Chilton is Old English for "Child's Town". When the Domesday Book was produced in 1086, Robert Malet (a member of William the Conqueror's court) was the village's tenant-in-chief. It was located in Babergh Hundred.

It is unclear why the village was abandoned, though it is speculated that it may have been caused by the Black Death, the enclosure of Chilton Hall's deer park, or agricultural depression.

The William Andrews Clark Memorial Library (part of the University of California, Los Angeles) has a handwritten manuscript of wedding sermon preached at Chilton by Matthew Lawrence, Ipswich Town Preacher.

Until the 1960s a single house remained standing adjacent to the church. Although the church is redundant, services are still held three times a year.

During World War II an airfield was built largely within the parish. Initially called Airfield 174, it was later renamed RAF Sudbury. It was completed in 1943 and handed over to the USAAF on 23 March 1944. With three runways, the airfield was home to the USAAF 486th Bomber Group (now evolved into the 486th Air Expeditionary Wing). The hangars are now used largely for grain storage.

The hall, previously home to the grandmother of Robert Walpole (the first Prime Minister of Great Britain), is today home to Lord Hart of Chilton.
