= Lullism =

Esoteric philosophy originally developed by Ramon Llull

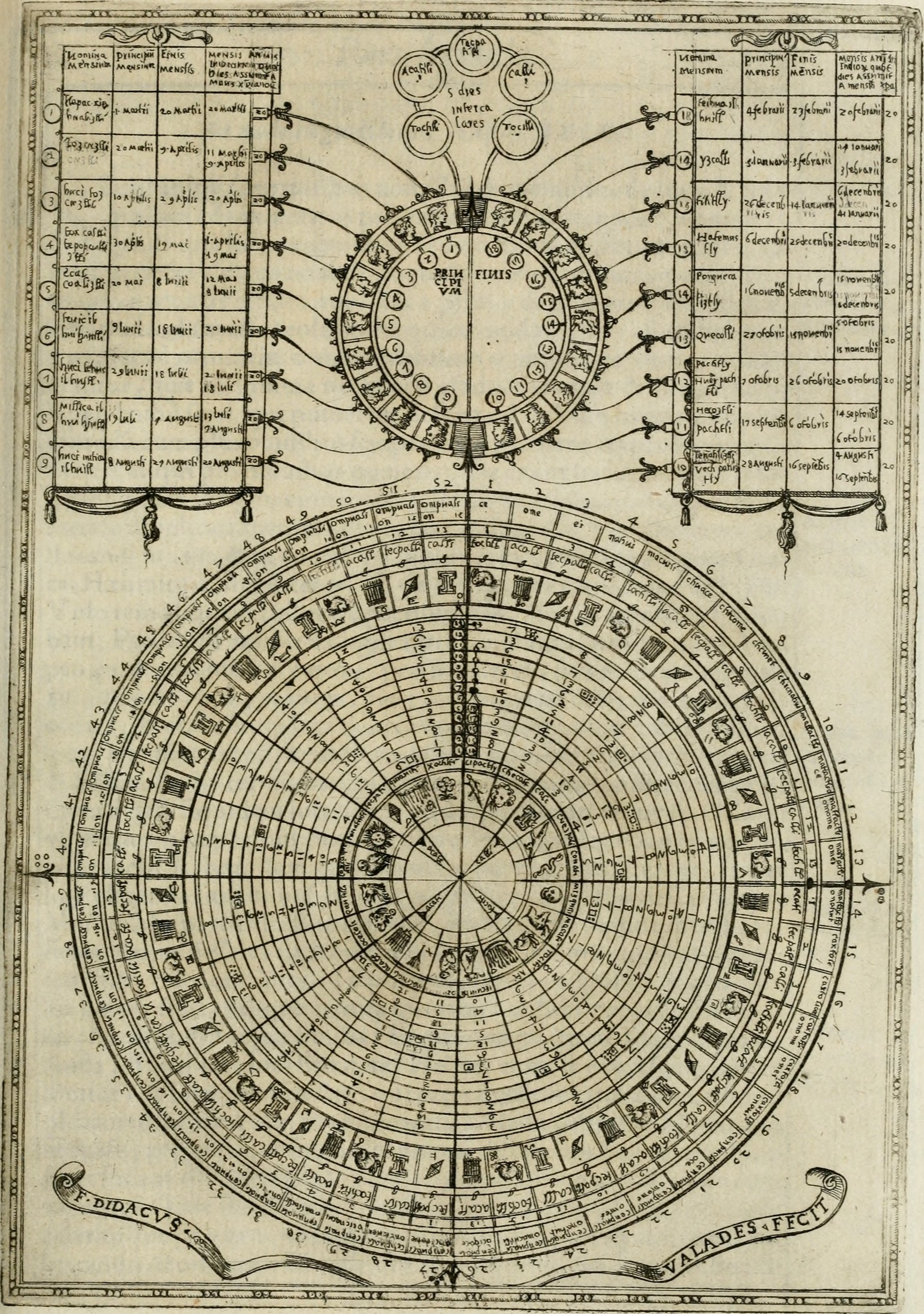
An image from the Rhetorica christiana by Diego Valadés

Lullism (Catalan: lul·lisme) is a term for the philosophical and theological currents related to the thought of Ramon Llull (ca. 1232–1315). Lullism also refers to the project of editing and disseminating Llull's works. The earliest centers of Lullism were in fourteenth-century France, Mallorca, and Italy.

Llull's early followers in France, for instance, were theologians at the University of Paris who believed that Llull's Art could provide a universal science to replace the traditional university curriculum.

Later forms of Lullism have been associated with mysticism, alchemy, encyclopaedism, and evangelism and have usually involved diagrammatic imagery. Notable Lullists were Nicholas of Cusa, Jacques Lefèvre d'Étaples, Francisco Jiménez de Cisneros, Gottfried Leibniz, Giordano Bruno, Johann Heinrich Alsted, Jožef Mislej, and Ivo Salzinger.

== Academic Lullism ==
Lullism in France started at the University of Paris after Ramon Llull visited Paris in the 1280s and his books became available to the academic world. Some scholastic theologians saw in Llull's Art a new scientific and demonstrative method for theology, given that Aristotelian logic was not sufficient for acquiring knowledge of God (or proving the truths of the faith). Collections of manuscripts of Llull's works at the Sorbonne and the Carthusian Monastery at Vauvert laid the foundation for the study of Llull both in France and further afield. Although Jean Gerson had forbidden Llull's works to be taught in the Arts Faculty in Paris at the end of the fourteenth century, the study of Llull increased in the fifteenth century. There was a Lullian school in Barcelona that produced academics who taught in Bologna, Venice, and Padua. Lullism only officially came back to Paris with Jacques Lefèvre d'Étaples who taught at the Collège du Cardinal Lemoine at the University of Paris at the beginning of the sixteenth century. Lefèvre also published eight of Llull's works and was active in circulating them internationally. He seems to have been interested in the Lullian Art, especially as a method of contemplation and sent copies of Llull's books to religious houses. Another Lullist very active in publishing was Bernard de Lavinheta who had come to Paris briefly in 1515 and continued to be active in Lyon and Cologne. Like Llull's early Parisian proponents, Lavinheta sought to show that the Lullian Art laid the foundation for a general science.

== Mystical theology ==
Other thinkers were attracted to the Lullian Art because its combinatorial, visual, and algebraic aspects allowed for new modes of theological language and imagery. Like his teacher Heymeric de Campo who had studied Llull's works in Paris before teaching at Cologne, Nicholas of Cusa possessed many of Llull's books. Nicholas of Cusa appropriated diagrammatic aspects of Llull's thought for his own mystical theology. Whereas Llull's use of figures and combinatorics had been literal and systematic, Nicholas of Cusa deployed geometrical figures as metaphors for seeing and not seeing, knowing and not knowing, oneness and otherness, etc., with respect to understanding God.

== Alchemy ==
A corpus of alchemical works became associated with his name after Llull’s death, probably not earlier than the 1370's. In many cases, these Pseudo-Lullian works are characterized by the use of alphabets or figures resembling Lull’s combinatory diagrams. The earliest of these works, known as the Testamentum, presents such devices as means of memorizing the alchemical opus.

== Evangelism and the New World ==
Llull originally formulated his Art to prove the truth of the Christian faith to all the people of the world starting from general principles. In this vein, many early Spanish missionaries to the New World were Lullists or familiar with Llull's thought. The Cardinal Francisco Jiménez de Cisneros who had spearheaded a reform in Spain had also mobilized an effort to edit many of Llull's works. He also was responsible for sending a group of Franciscan missionaries on Columbus's second expedition to the Americas. Some years later the missionary Diego de Valadés wrote one of the manuals most influenced by Lullism, the Rhetorica Christiana. In this work he explains how a preacher might ascend and descend through levels of causation based on a Lullian system of divine principles and subjects of being. He also included many images, both trees and other figures.

== Humanist encyclopaedism and rationalism ==
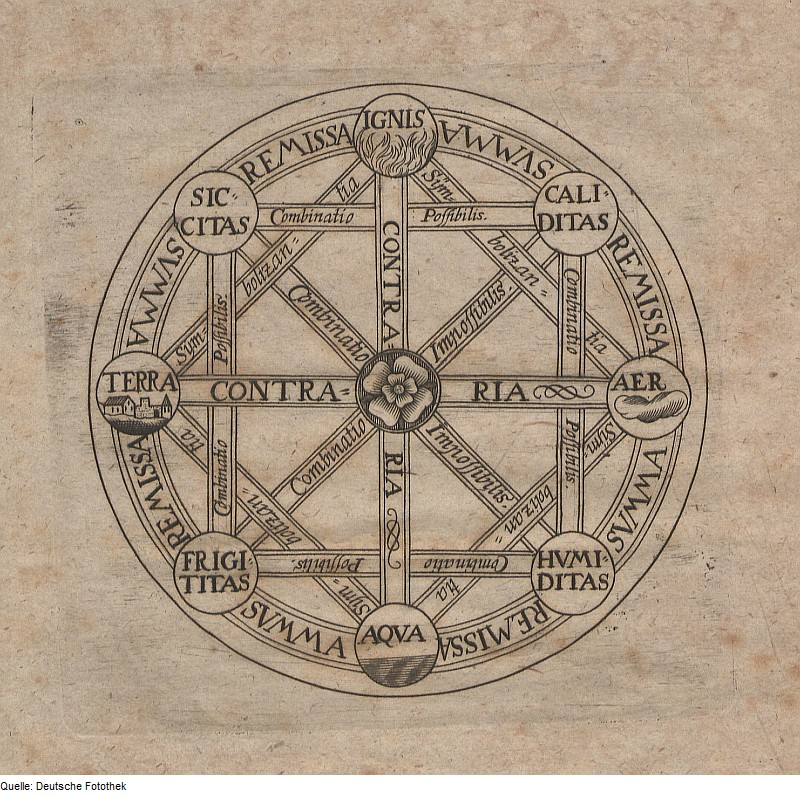
Frontispiece of De arte combinatoria printed in 1690

In the sixteenth century, Llull's works appeared increasingly in print. Lefèvre in France and Cardinal Cisneros in Spain embarked on projects to publish Llull's works. Bernard de Lavinheta also published his own Lullist-encyclopaedist works, notably the Explanatio compendiosaque applicatio artis Raymundi Lulli which explains how the Art is the introduction to all faculties: physics, mathematics, metaphysics, theology, ethics, medicine, and law. Heinrich Cornelius Agrippa’s commentary on the Lullian Art, on the other hand, marked a revival of its metaphysical dimension. Agrippa emphasizes that the structure of the method, or discourse, of the Art reflects the structure of the physical world. This commentary seems to have influenced Giordano Bruno, who commented on the Lullian Art as early as 1582 in the work De compendiosa architectura et complemento Artis Lullii, in his search for a philosophical discourse which reflected the physical, intellectual, and metaphysical order of the universe.

In 1598 the Strasbourg printer Lazarus Zetzner published an anthology of Llull’s works with commentaries on the Art by Agrippa and Bruno, reprinted in 1609 and 1617. This anthology is thought to have been highly influential in promoting the development of Lullism toward encyclopedic and pansophical schemes of the seventeenth century.

The seventeenth century, however, brought other approaches to systematic knowledge by Petrus Ramus and Descartes. Encyclopaedists such as Johann Heinrich Alsted wrote commentaries critically comparing the logics of Aristotle, Ramus, and Llull. It was in this milieu that Gottfried Wilhelm Leibniz probably became familiar with Llull. In 1666 Leibniz wrote the De arte combinatoria with the idea that all concepts can be generated through a combinatorial system.
