= Ferdinando Adams =

17th-century Anglican

Ferdinando Adams (fl. 1636-1637) was a shoemaker and churchwarden in Ipswich who was excommunicated from the Anglican Church in 1636. Clement Corbet, Chancellor of Diocese of Norwich complained to Matthew Wren, Bishop of Norwich (5 December 1635 - 24 April 1638) that “There be too many Adames in that towne, both Ecclesiasticks and Laickes”. Adams emigrated with his wife Ann to New England, settling in Dedham, Massachusetts. Adams settled in Dedham in 1637.

== Excommunication ==
Ferdinando Adams fulfilled the role of churchwarden - a lay official of the parish – at St Mary le Tower, Ipswich at a time when William Laud, as newly appointed Archbishop of Canterbury initiated the Laudian reforms in the organisation of church space - for which the churchwarden was responsible. These reforms were contentious amongst puritans, for many of whom Ipswich was their home. Samuel Ward had been Ipswich Town Preacher - the most highly paid official of Ipswich Corporation since 1605.
