= Cave Beck =

English schoolmaster and clergyman

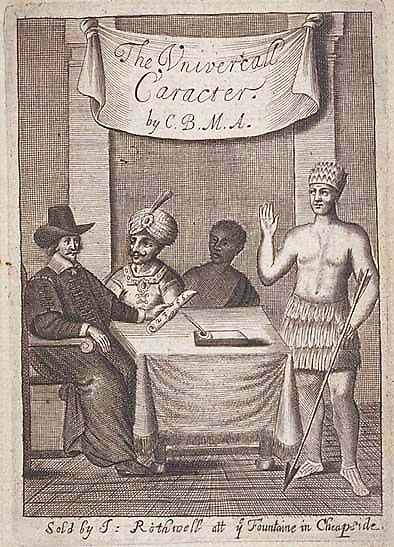
Frontispiece of Cave Beck's Universal Character.

Cave Beck (1623 – 1706) was an English schoolmaster and clergyman, the author of The Universal Character (published in London, 1657) in which he proposed a universal language based on a numerical system.

== Life ==
Beck was born in London in 1623, the son of John Beck, a baker (or perhaps an inn-keeper or brewer) in the parish of St. John, Clerkenwell. He was educated in a private school in London run by a Mr. Braithwayte, and on 13 June 1638 was admitted as a pensioner of St. John's College, Cambridge. He took the degree of B.A. in 1642, and then enrolled as a trainee lawyer at Gray's Inn, London on 1 August 1642, but does not appear to have gained any legal qualifications. In 1643, he was to be found in Oxford, where King Charles I had formed his headquarters during the English Civil War. As a result of royal patronage, he was awarded a degree as M.A., on 17 October 1643.

Beck was master of Ipswich School, Ipswich in Suffolk from 1650 to 1657 – Beck Street in that same town is named after him. His position involved looking after the Town Library of Ipswich. He introduced a fore-edge shelfmarking system.A diagonal line was drawn across the fore-edge of the books with additional marks to indicate to which shelf the book belonged. In 1657, he resigned and was replaced by former usher Robert Woodside; in 1659, after Woodside's death, he returned to the headmaster post for a further six months.

In 1655 he was appointed by the town corporation as Ipswich Town Preacher. In 1657 he became curate of St. Margaret, Ipswich. He had a long-term working relationship with a succession of Viscounts of Hereford, which began with Beck's appointment as tutor to the 5th Viscount's son, Leicester Devereux. In 1660, he accompanied Hereford to the Netherlands as part of a deputation to bring King Charles II back to England at the time of The Restoration. On his return, he was given the living of the parish of St Mary Witton, near Droitwich, and then also the living of St Helen's Church, Ipswich. Finally, in 1674, he was also appointed to the living of Monk Soham, near Ipswich. He appears to have held all three church appointments, all within the gift of Viscount Hereford, until his death.

Beck died in Ipswich in August or September 1706. He left everything to his wife Sarah. This may have been his second wife, another 'Sarah Becke' having died in Ipswich in 1666. No children benefited from his will, which was proven in July 1707, and it is likely there were none extant.

== Work ==
Beck is remembered for his book, The Universal Character, printed in London in 1657 by Thomas Maxey, on behalf of William Weekly, bookseller of Ipswich. The book's full title was The Universal Character, by which all Nations in the World may understand one another's Conceptions, Reading out of one Common Writing their own Mother Tongues. An Invention of General Use, the Practise whereof may be Attained in two Hours' space, Observing the Grammatical Directions. Which Character is so contrived, that it may be Spoken as well as Written. A French translation of the book (Le Charactere Universel) was published by Maxey's widow Anne in London in 1657.

In his book Beck drew up the rules for a universal language that could be understood and used by anyone in the world. It was based on a list of around 4,000 'radicals' - a basic vocabulary of essential words. Each radical was assigned a numerical value (from 1 to 3996) in strict English alphabetical order. Thus, abandon is 1, and zone is 3996. Each radical can then be turned into an impersonal noun, a personal noun, a verb, adverb, adjective, or the word's opposite, and so on, by certain prefixes. For example, r2518 = labour, p2518 = labourer, pf2518s = female labourers, t2518 = in a laboured manner, etc. Verbal tenses and persons were indicated by specific suffixes. For example: ad2518 = I have laboured, malf2518s = we should have laboured. In Beck's glossary, there are almost 8,000 entries, since synonyms were included, each referring to a radical.
Each language would have its own alphabetically ordered list of words for reference. But the number assigned to each radical was to be the same whatever the native language of the user.
Rules for pronunciation of the numbers were also set out, as follows: 1 = On, 2 = Too or To, 3 = Tre ('tray'), 4 = For ('fore') or Fo, 5 = Fi ('fie'), 6 = Sic, 7 = Sen, 8 = At, 9 = Nin ('neen'), 0 = o ('oh').

The system, though arousing interest amongst Beck's contemporaries, was not well received by those who studied it. However, a modern expert suggests that, 'though Beck's originality as a linguist cannot be rated highly, he should certainly be remembered as the creator of the first complete 'Universal Character' to be printed, not only in Britain but, in all likelihood, in the whole of Europe'.

On the frontispiece of Beck's The Universal Character is an engraving by William Faithorne, and the figure of the European is supposed, with great probability, to be the portrait of the author.

== See also ==
- Pasigraphy
- George Dalgarno (1635–1682) and John Wilkins (1614–72) who each devised a universal character.
- Joachim Becher proposed a numerically based universal language scheme in his book Character pro notitia linguarum universali in 1661.
- Athanasius Kircher (1601/2 – 1680) proposed a universal language in Polygraphia nova et universalis in 1663.
