= St Mary's Church, Chilton =

Coordinates: 52.0461°N 0.7542°E

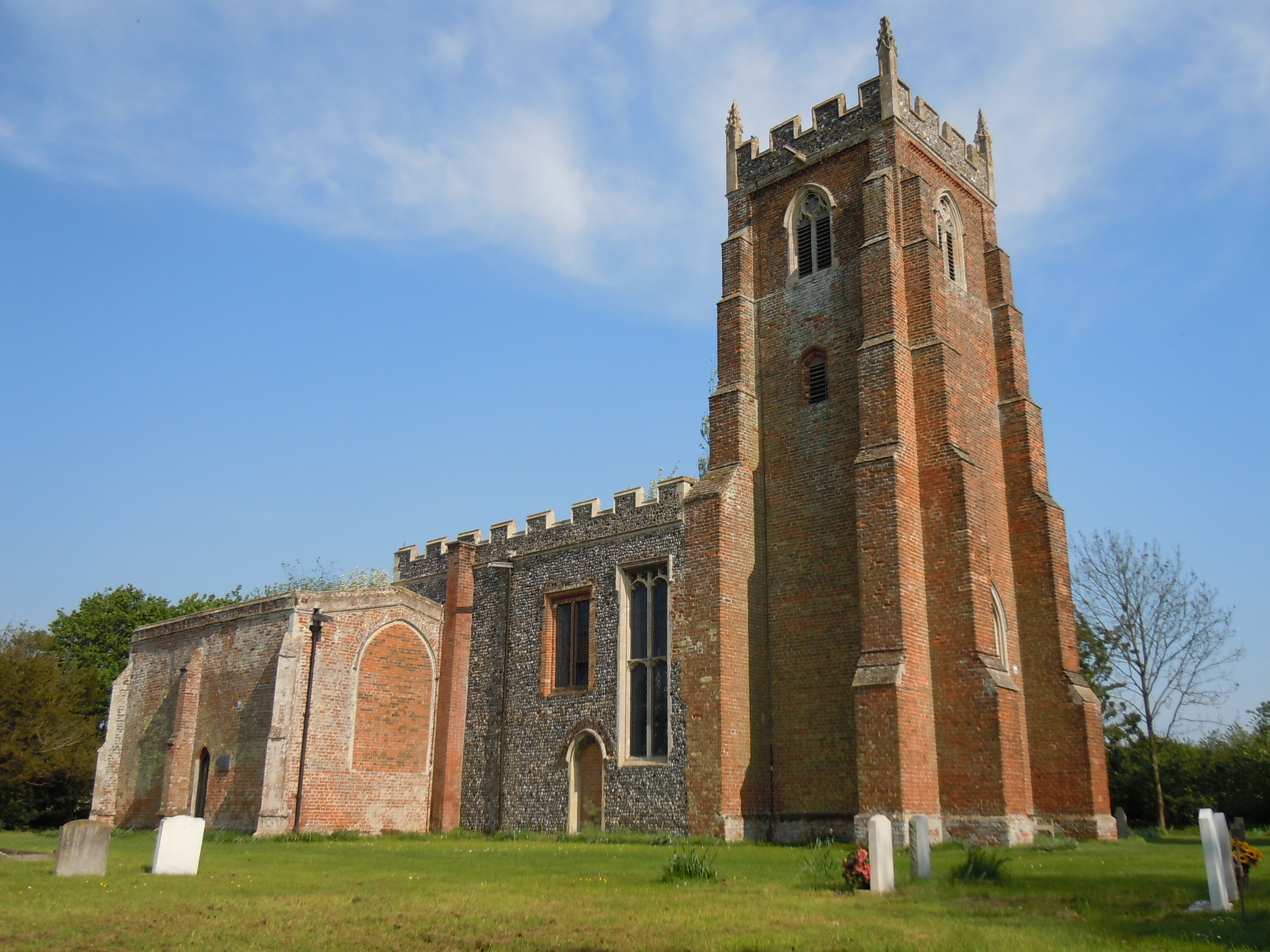
- St Mary's Church seen from the northwest

- Location in Suffolk
- OS grid reference: TL889423
- Location: Chilton, Suffolk
- Country: England
- Denomination: Church of England
- Website: St Mary's Church, Chilton, Suffolk

History
- Dedication: St Mary

Architecture
- Functional status: Redundant
- Heritage designation: Grade I listed
- Designated: 23 March 1961
- Architectural type: Church
- Style: Perpendicular Gothic

Specifications
- Materials: Flint nave, chancel and porch; brick tower and north chapel

St Mary's Church is a redundant Church of England parish church in the civil parish of Chilton, Suffolk, England. It is a Grade I listed building, and is in the care of the Churches Conservation Trust.

The church is about 550 yards (500 m) south of the Tudor Chilton Hall and 1 1/4 miles (2 km) east-northeast of the centre of Sudbury. To the north and east it is surrounded by farmland. To the south and west are the Sudbury eastern bypass and associated modern buildings on the outskirts of Sudbury.

== History ==
The nave and chancel of the church are Perpendicular Gothic, built of flint in the 15th century. The south porch is also flint, but with brick quoins.

In the 16th century the Crane chapel north of the chancel and the west tower were added, and a Tudor window was inserted in the nave over the north doorway. All the 16th-century additions are built of brick.

The Crane chapel was built as a chantry chapel housing the table tombs of George Crane, who died in 1491, and Robert Crane, who died in 1500, and his wife. There is an alabaster recumbent effigy of George Crane on his tomb. After the Reformation the chapel continued as the Crane family mausoleum with the addition of the wall-mounted monument to Sir Robert Crane, 1st Baronet and his two wives. Sir Robert died in 1643 but he had the monument carved in 1626 by Gerard Christmas.

The William Andrews Clark Memorial Library, part of the University of California, Los Angeles has a unique manuscript of a sermon preached at St Mary's by Matthew Lawrence at the time Ipswich Town Preacher. This was delivered at the marriage ceremony of Anne Crane, the daughter of Sir Robert Crane to Sir William Armine, 2nd Baronet on 28 August 1649. The handwritten book, which mimics the style of a printed book, was produced by John Raymond and was sponsored by Lawrence as a gift for the groom's father, Sir William Armine, 1st Baronet, who had requested a copy. He had been a patron of Matthew Lawrence for many years. The book was previously owned by the antiquarian, John Eglington Bailey and the designer, Richard Harding Watt.

By the 1970s the small population of the parish of Chilton could no longer support the church. The Diocese of St Edmundsbury and Ipswich merged the benefice with that of St Gregory's Church, Sudbury and declared St Mary's redundant. In the 1980s the church building was vested in the care of the Churches Conservation Trust.

== Architecture ==
The west tower has substantial brick angle buttresses. The tower and nave have flint battlements and the tower has crocketted pinnacles at the four corners. The Crane chapel is of two bays and its two northern corners have diagonal buttresses. The south porch has a moulded brick parapet.

== See also ==
- List of churches preserved by the Churches Conservation Trust in the East of England
