= The Compleat Angler =

1653 book by Izaak Walton

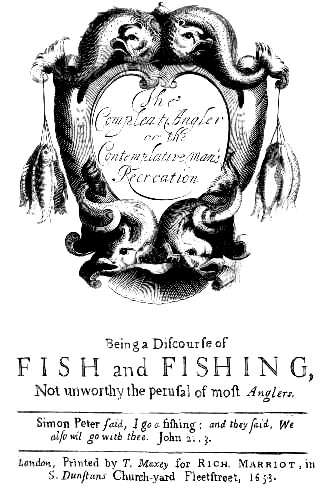
First edition

The Compleat Angler (often modernised to The Complete Angler) is a book by Izaak Walton, first published in 1653 by Richard Marriot in London. Walton continued to add to it for a quarter of a century. It is a celebration, in prose and verse, of the art and spirit of fishing. The book was illustrated by Arthur Rackham in 1931.

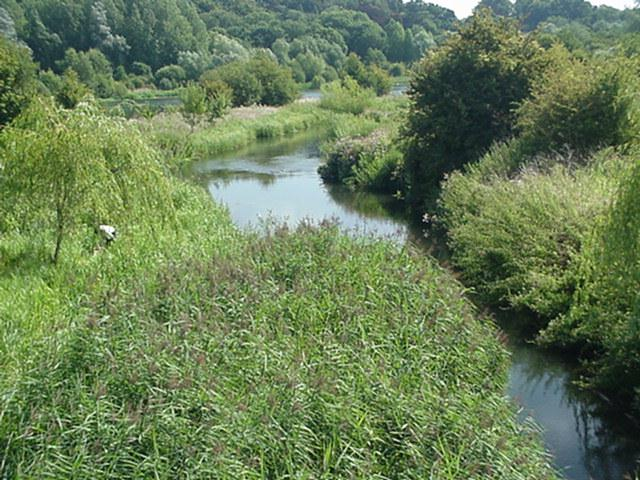
The River Lea at Great Amwell, Hertfordshire, where Izaak Walton used to fish

Walton had spent his early life in Stafford, before moving to London in his teens. While the book initially describes fishing trips up the Lea Valley in Hertfordshire, it is thought to reflect Walton's own experience with fishing in the River Dove on the border between Staffordshire and Derbyshire.

The book was published in the aftermath of the English Civil War, with Walton depicting "scenes of harmony" away from the political turbulence of his era. He disliked the Puritan regime of the 1650s, but the book contains only a "muted comment" on politics and war. The book's first publisher, Richard Marriot, had a personal connection to Walton because Walton was a personal friend of Marriot's then-retired father. The Angler was republished in new editions in 1655, 1661, 1668, and 1676. The last of these editions is an expanded version, with additional chapters written by Charles Cotton.

== Background ==
Walton was born in Stafford and moved to London in his teens to learn a trade. The Compleat Angler reflects the author's connections with these two locations, especially on the River Dove, central England, which forms the border between Staffordshire and Derbyshire in the Peak District. The book was dedicated to John Offley of Madeley, Staffordshire, and there are references in it to fishing in the English Midlands. However, the work begins with Londoners making a fishing trip up the Lea Valley in Hertfordshire, starting at Tottenham.

Walton was not sympathetic to the Puritan regime of the 1650s and the work has been seen as a reaction to the turbulence of the English Civil War and its aftermath; "the disorder of the present times received muted comment in the work's scenes of harmony", is the view of the Oxford Dictionary of National Biography. "Study to be Quiet" was one of Walton's favourite mottos.

=== Sources ===
Walton's sources included earlier publications on fishing, such as the Treatyse of Fysshynge with an Angle included in the Book of Saint Albans. Six verses were quoted from John Dennys's 1613 work The Secrets of Angling.

== Editions ==
The Compleat Angler was first published by the bookseller Richard Marriot, whose business was based in Fleet Street near where Walton had a shop. Walton was a friend of Marriott's father, John, who had started the business, but was in retirement by the time the book appeared. The book was printed by Thomas Maxey of Paul's Wharf.

The first edition featured dialogue between veteran angler Piscator and student Viator, while later editions changed Viator to hunter Venator and added falconer Auceps.

There were several editions during the author's lifetime. There was a second edition in 1655, a third in 1661 (identical with that of 1664), a fourth in 1668, and a fifth in 1676. In this last edition, the thirteen chapters of the original had grown to twenty-one; a second part was added by his friend and brother angler Charles Cotton, who took up Venator where Walton had left him and completed his instruction in fly fishing and the making of flies.

== Illustrations ==
Starting with the first edition, which featured anonymous illustrations, the work has inspired numerous artists, including Arthur Rackham (1931).

== Sources ==
- Martin, Jessica (2004). "Walton, Izaak (1593–1683), author and biographer". Oxford Dictionary of National Biography. (subscription or member of UK public library required)
- "This Obscure Fishing Book is One of the Most Reprinted English Books Ever", Smithsonian.com, US, 2017
