= Anne Maxwell =

Anne Maxwell may refer to:

- Anne Fitzalan-Howard, Duchess of Norfolk (1927–2013), née Anne Maxwell
- Ann Maxwell (born 1944), author
- Anne Maxwell (printer), English printer
