= Sarah Morduck =

Sarah Morduck (died 1713) was an Englishwoman accused of being a malevolent witch in 1701. When she was acquitted in court, the man who had originally accused her of the crime, a blacksmith's apprentice named Richard Hathaway, was charged with making false claims.

Morduck's case subsequently became "cited frequently" by historians studying the English witch trials, in particular to highlight both judicial skepticism toward witchcraft and the continued popular belief in it. The first in-depth historical examination of the case was produced by William Renwick Riddell in an academic paper published in 1928. The first reassessment of the historical sources pertaining to the trial was produced by Lara Apps in an academic paper of hers published in the journal Preternature.

Morduck lived for several years after the ordeal, dying in early 1713; she was buried on 8 January 1713 in the churchyard of Saint Benet and Saint Peter, Paul's Wharf.
