= Encyclopaedia Cursus Philosophici =

1620 encyclopaedia by Johann Heinrich Alsted

The Encyclopaedia Cursus Philosophici is an encyclopedia of Johann Heinrich Alsted (1588–1638).

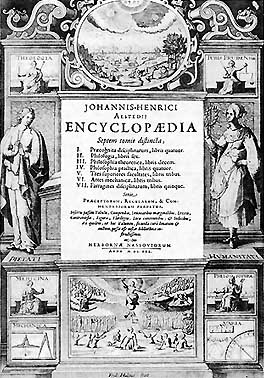
Frontispiece to the Encyclopaedia of Johann Heinrich Alsted (Herborn 1630)

Johann Heinrich Alsted published the Encyclopaedia in seven volumes in 1620 in Herborn. It is often argued that this is the first work to bear the title "encyclopedia", though Joachim Sterck van Ringelbergh's Lucubrationes vel potius absolutissima kyklopaideia was published in 1588, and Paul Scalich published Encyclopediae seu orbis disciplinarum tam sacrarum quam profanarum epistemon in 1559.

Alsted was attempting with his Encyclopaedia to emulate the combination system of Ramon Llull as set out in Llull's 1308 Ars Magna, and thus to formulate a system of universal knowledge and a Llullian method for systematising the sciences. The scheme includes categorisations such as:

- generic - specific;
- peripheral - central;
- internal - external;
- communal - individual;
- quantum ad locum - ad conditionem ad aetatem;
- preparatorius - elaboratorius.

Alsted's approach influenced, among others, the pedagogue Johann Amos Comenius and the Hungarian encyclopedist Apáczai Csere János (1625–1659). Alsted's vision was that with the right methodologies of teaching and application, any person could have access to a perfect knowledge of all sciences.

== Extant copies ==
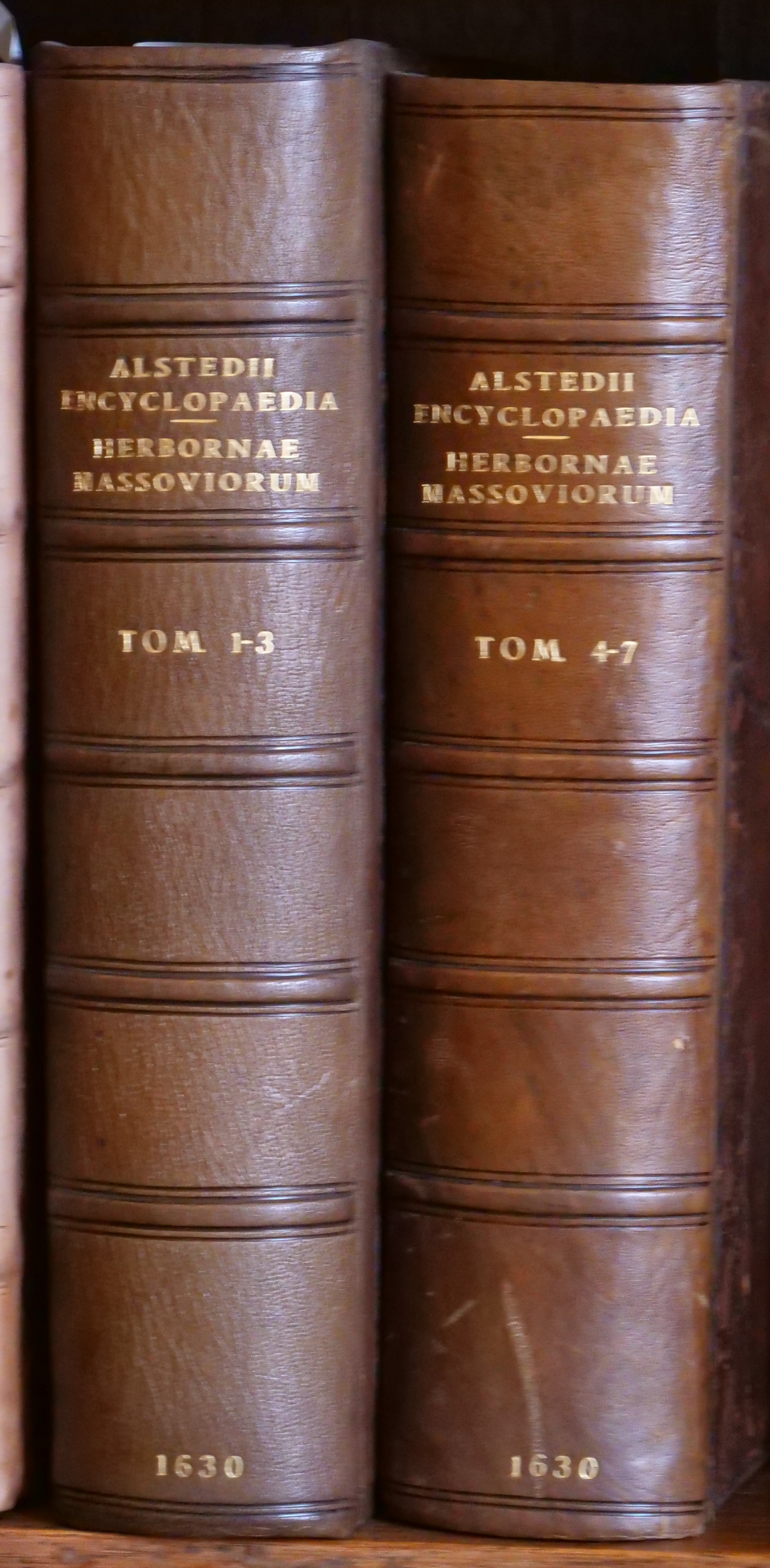

- There is a copy of the 1630 edition in the Town Library of Ipswich, Suffolk
