= Shelfmark =

Term in library science

A shelfmark is a mark in a book or manuscript that denotes the cupboard or bookcase where it is kept as well as the shelf and possibly even its location on the shelf. The closely related term pressmark (from press, meaning cupboard) denotes only the cupboard or case. It is distinct from a call number, which is the code under which a book or manuscript is registered and which is used to identify it when ordering it. Sometimes a shelfmark or pressmark may be used as a call number, but in other cases the call number contains no information about the book's physical location. In certain American institutions, shelfmark and call number are combined to create a long code containing information on location, classification, size, binding, author and date. Shelfmarks and pressmarks were usually written, inscribed or stamped on the pastedowns. When a book was moved, the old shelfmark was usually crossed out and a new one added. Old shelfmarks can sometimes provide valuable information about a manuscript's provenance.

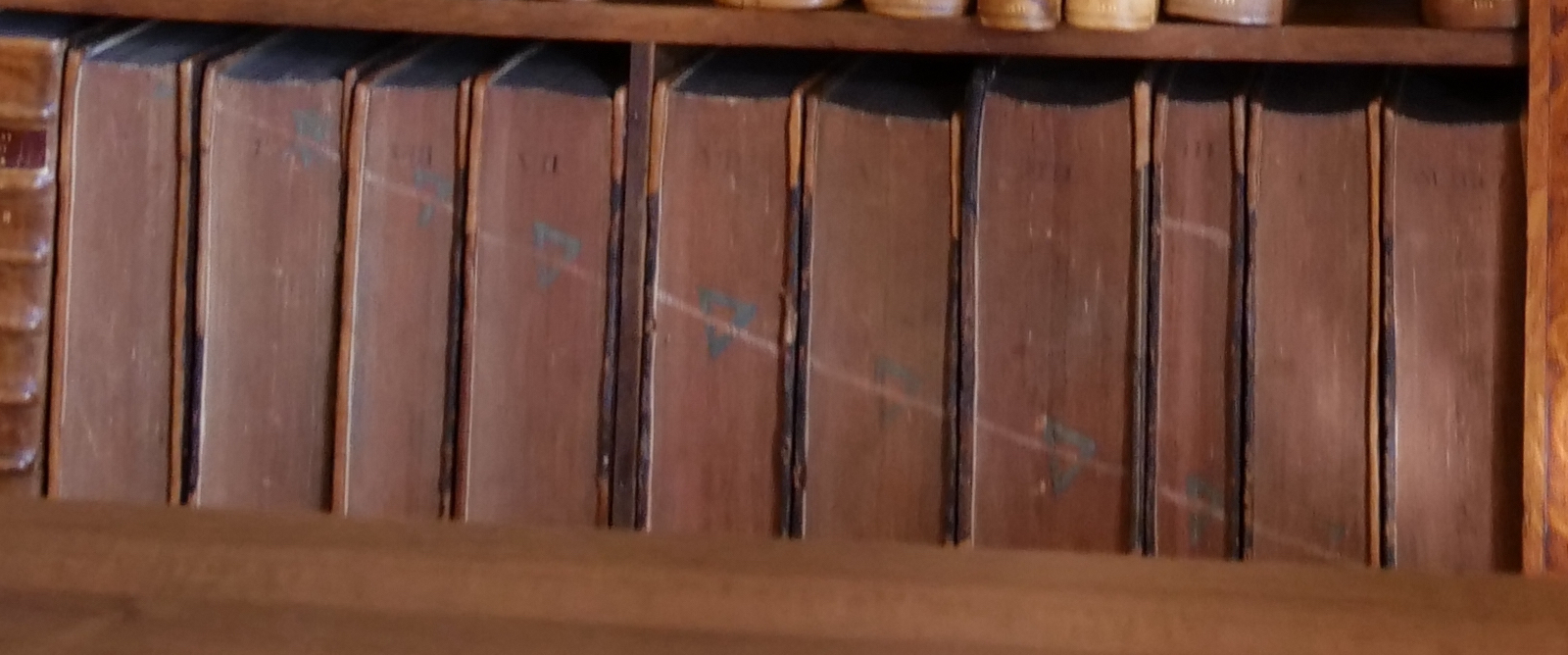
Cave Beck's fore-edge shelfmark system

Shelfmarks originated in the early Middle Ages, usually as combinations of numbers and letters, probably indicating the cupboard and shelf. Letters later came to be assigned to specific batch acquisitions. In the modern period, university libraries often organized their collections by subject and indicated the faculty in the shelfmark. As libraries grew larger, alphanumeric shelfmarks were augmented with Greek letters and the symbols of the zodiac. By the seventeenth century the Cotton library incorporates the names of Roman emperors in it shelfmarks, based on the location of imperial busts in Robert Cotton's original library.

Cave Beck introduced a fore-edge shelfmark system for the Town Library of Ipswich in 1651. A diagonal line was drawn across the fore-edge of the books with an additional pressmark to indicate to which shelf of which press the book belonged.

Shelfmarking declined in the 19th century with the rise of classification schemes like Dewey Decimal Classification.

== See also ==
- Accession number (library science)
