= Samuel Garratt =

Samuel Garratt (20 February 1817, London – 21 March 1906, Ipswich) was an English clergyman active in the Evangelical Party of the Church of England.

Garratt was appointed the minister of Trinity Church in St Giles in the Fields in 1850. His parish included the St Giles Rookery, a notorious slum occupied by a community of Irish Catholics. He attracted a broad range of Evangelical Anglicans to his church where he preached about "prophetical questions" having closely studied the Book of Revelation. This included his speculations that the Roman Catholic Church would unite with the Eastern Orthodox Church and the Anglo-Catholic wing of the Church of England to become the Antichrist.

In 1867 he left London for Ipswich where he was appointed the minister for St Margaret's Church by the Simeon's Trustees, an Evangelical Anglican organisation.

In 1881 he was appointed as an honorary canon at Norwich Cathedral.

He gave up his benefice in 1895, but remained active, sharing his understanding of the prophetical aspects of the Christian scriptures with the readers of The Times of London until shortly before his death.

His daughter, Evelyn Garratt published Life and Personal Recollections of Samuel Garratt in 1908.

The Garratt Memorial Hall, Ipswich, is named after Samuel.

== Works ==
- 1881: What shall we do ? or True Evangelical Policy
