= Matthew Lawrence (preacher) =

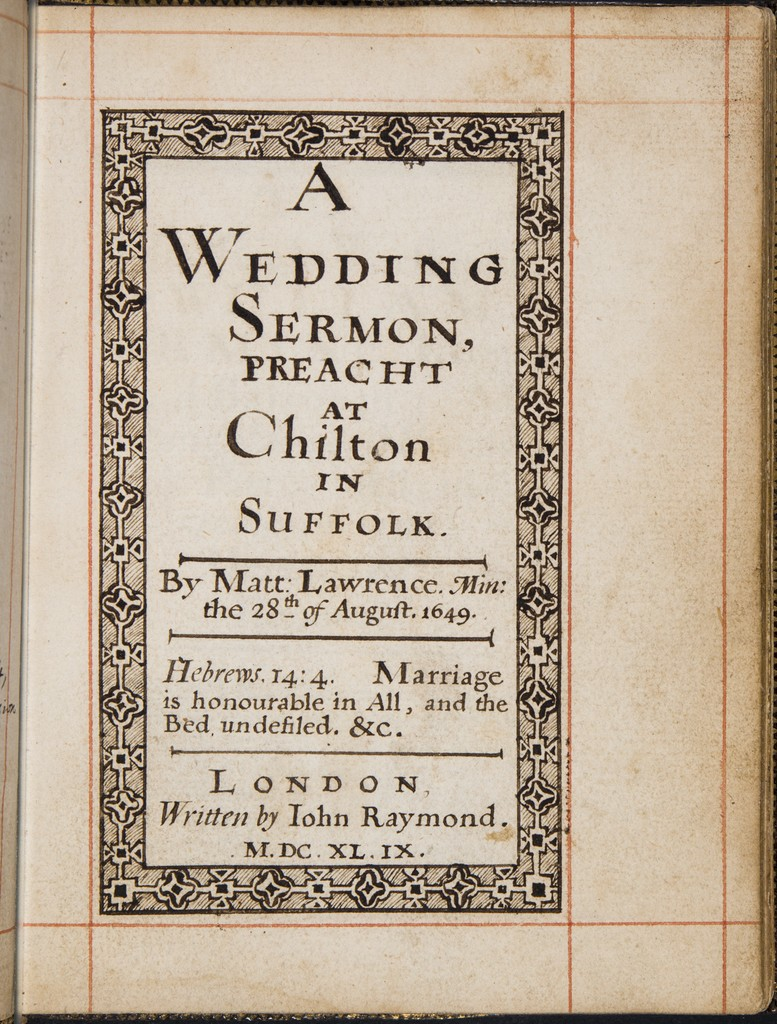
Title page of Matthew Lawrence's Wedding Sermon

Matthew Lawrence (1596–1651/52) was the Ipswich Town Preacher in Ipswich from 1643 to 1652.

Matthew was the son of William Lawrence and was Matthew was christened at Saxby All Saints, North Lincolnshire on February 1596.

Lawrence was buried in St Mary le Tower, Ipswich and there remains a monument to him where it was reset at the west end of the nave.

In 1657 Use and Practice of Faith was printed by Anne Maxwell (as A.Maxey) and published by William Weekly of Ipswich. The book runs to 624 pages, and contained a preface written by John Ward, Nathaniel Smart and Joseph Waite.

The William Andrews Clark Memorial Library, part of the University of California, Los Angeles has a unique manuscript of a sermon preached by Matthew Lawrence. The sermon was delivered at the marriage ceremony of Anne Crane, the daughter of Sir Robert Crane, 1st Baronet to Sir William Armine, 2nd Baronet on 28 August 1649 in St Mary's Church Chilton, Suffolk. The handwritten book, which mimics the style of a printed book, was produced by John Raymond and was sponsored by Lawrence as a gift for the groom's father, Sir William Armine, 1st Baronet, who had requested a copy. He had been a patron of Matthew Lawrence for many years. The book was previously owned by the antiquarian, John Eglington Bailey and the designer, Richard Harding Watt.
