= Roger Kelke =

English churchman and academic

Roger Kelke (1524–1576) was an English churchman and academic, a Marian exile and Master of Magdalene College, Cambridge from 1558 and Archdeacon of Stow from 1563.

== Early life ==
Roger was the son of Christopher Kelke of Barnetby, Lincolnshire. His father died shortly after Roger was born, and his mother, Isabel Girlington subsequently married William Tyrwhit. Amongst her subsequent children Roger had some notable half-brothers who were Members of Parliament: Robert Tyrwitt, Tristram Tyrwhitt and Marmaduke Tyrwhitt.

Kelke was a student at St John's College, Cambridge, graduating B.A. in 1544, M.A. in 1547. He was elected a fellow of St John's around 1545, a preacher there on 25 April 1552, and a senior fellow the following October.

== Career ==
On the accession of Mary I of England, Kelke left the country, and his name appears in the list of exiles at Zürich on 23 October 1554. He returned to Cambridge on the accession of Elizabeth I; in August 1558 was nominated Lady Margaret preacher in the university, and on 1 November that year was appointed master of Magdalene College. He was re-elected to his senior fellowship at St John's a few days later (9 November) The conditions of the Lady Margaret preachership, a post he continued to hold until 1565, required that the preacher should deliver annually six sermons at places in Lincolnshire and Cambridgeshire.

In 1560 Kelke was appointed by the corporation of Ipswich, sympathetic his evangelical doctrines, as Ipswich Town Preacher or lecturer. He was not fully accepted there: on 9 July 1565 he was unsuccessfully denounced to a court of the corporation as "a liar" and "a preacher of noe trewe doctrine". The Ipswich connection brought students to Magdalene, via Ipswich grammar school and John Dawes installed as master there with Kelke's help. They included Adam Winthrop, father of John Winthrop.

Kelke continued to fill the office of master at Magdalene College until his death; during that time he was twice a candidate for the mastership of St John's College, in 1563 and again in 1569. On the former occasion he was actually elected, having been strongly recommended to William Cecil; but Cecil favoured another candidate, Richard Longworth. On 15 May 1563 he was collated to the archdeaconry of Stow, and in the following year he proceeded D.D.

The opposition at Cambridge during the vestiarian controversy to Archbishop Matthew Parker's Advertisements included Kelke. With Whitgift and three others, he represented to Cecil that its requirements on clerical dress would be divisive.

Kelke twice filled the university post of vice-chancellor; in 1567, for a few months only, on the death of Robert Beaumont, and again for the academic year 1571–2. On 8 August 1572 he was collated to the rectory of Teversham in Cambridgeshire. During all this time Kelke was living mostly in Ipswich,. During his second tenure of the vice-chancellorship the common council of Ipswich on 6 December 1571 had a preacher named Keyes to fill his place. Subsequently he accepted a salary from the corporation, on condition that he became resident, and preached every Sunday, Wednesday, and Friday, and also visited the sick and afflicted. He continued there until late in life.

In 1564, on the occasion of a royal visit to Cambridge, Kelke obtained from the Duke of Norfolk a contribution towards the completion of the buildings of Magdalene College. His time in Ipswich, depressed the repution and credit of the college.

== Death and aftermath ==
Kelke died on 6 January 1576, and was buried in the chancel of Great St Mary's Church, Cambridge. His epitaph mentioned his preaching and religious convictions.

On 13 December 1574 a grant in perpetuity was made by the college to the crown, at a fixed rent, of an estate in London with which the society had been endowed by its founder Thomas Audley, 1st Baron Audley of Walden. The act was unlawful. Kelke, on his own account, induced the Fellows to agree to the transaction, which also stipulated that the transfer should be void unless, by a given day, the queen regranted it to Benedict Spinola, a Genoese merchant, and his heirs.

== Family ==
Kelke's will, dated 12 December 1575, mentions his wife Rose, his daughter Abigail, his brother Francis, and his nephew Christopher, the son of Francis. Abigail married Nicholas Farrer of Pinner, or Nicholas Faunt.

== Notes ==
Attribution

This article incorporates text from a publication now in the public domain: Lee, Sidney, ed. (1892). "Kelke, Roger". Dictionary of National Biography. Vol. 30. London: Smith, Elder & Co.
