= Samuel Ward (minister) =

English Puritan minister (1577–1640)

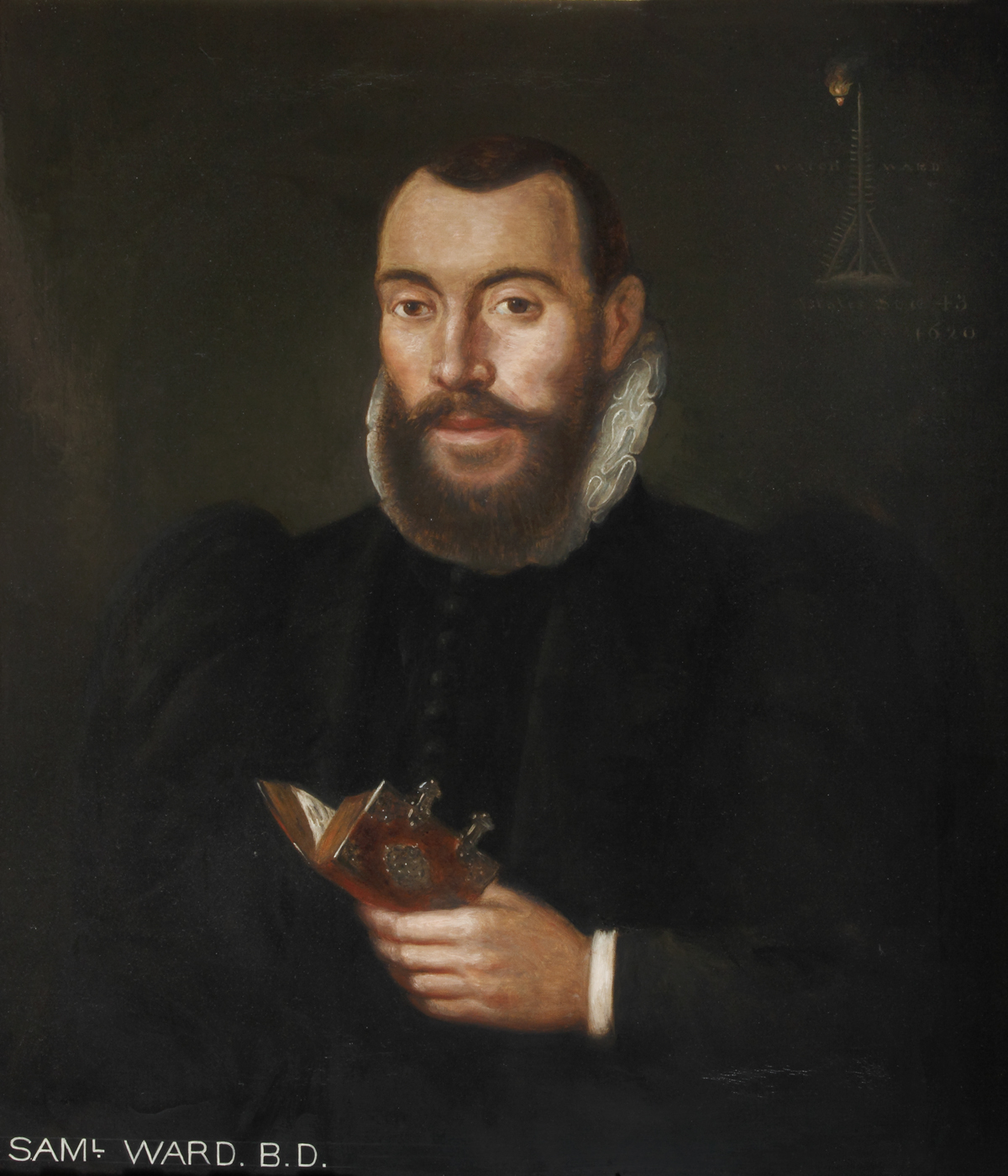

Samuel Ward (1577–1640) was an English Puritan minister of Ipswich.

== Life ==
Born in Suffolk, he was a son of John Ward, minister of Haverhill, and his wife, Susan. Nathaniel Ward was his younger brother. Another brother, John, was rector of St. Clement's, Ipswich. On the nomination of Lord Burghley, Samuel was admitted a scholar of St. John's College, Cambridge on 6 November 1594 – a college established in 1511 thanks to a foundation from Lady Margaret Beaufort. He graduated with a BA in 1596–7, was appointed one of the first fellows of Sidney Sussex College, Cambridge in 1599, and commenced there with an MA in 1600. Having finished his studies at the university, he became a lecturer at Haverhill, where he was a successful evangelical and became the 'spiritual father' of Samuel Fairclough.

On 1 November 1603 he was elected by the corporation of Ipswich to the office of Town Preacher, and he occupied the pulpit of St. Mary-le-Tower with little intermission for about thirty years. In 1604 he vacated his fellowship at Sidney College by his marriage to Deborah Bolton, widow, of Isleham, Cambridgeshire, and in 1607 he proceeded to the degree of BD He was one of the preachers at St Paul's Cross, London, in 1616.

In 1621 he designed an engraving, the Double Deliverance, with an anti-Catholic and anti-Spanish message, showing the Spanish Armada and Gunpowder Plot. Count Gondomar, the Spanish ambassador in London, represented it as an insult to his royal master. On one side was to be seen the wreck of the armada, driven in wild confusion by the storm; on the other side was the detection of the plot; and in the centre the pope and the cardinals appeared in consultation with the king of Spain and the devil.

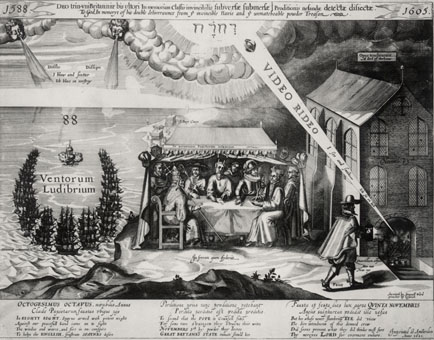
The Double Deliverance of England from the Spanish Armada and Gunpowder Plot, 1621.

Ward, whose name was engraved upon the print as the designer, was sent to and examined by the Privy Council, and was committed to prison. After a brief detention he was permitted to return to Ipswich, and he subsequently confined his talents as a designer to the ornamentation of the title-pages of his published sermons.

In 1622 Bishop Samuel Harsnett prosecuted Ward for nonconformity in the consistory court of Norwich. Ward appealed to the king, who referred the articles exhibited against him to the examination of Lord-keeper John Williams. Williams decided that Ward, though not altogether blameless, was a man easily to be won by fair dealing, and he persuaded the bishop to accept Ward's submission and not to remove him from the lectureship. He was accordingly released from the prosecution, but the king wrote to the Ipswich council to deter them. In 1624 Ward and Yates, another Ipswich clergyman, complained to a committee of the House of Commons about the Arminian tenets broached in A New Gag for an Old Goose by Richard Montagu. The session was drawing to a close, and the Commons referred the complaint to the Archbishop of Canterbury.

Ward subsequently incurred the displeasure of Archbishop William Laud. On 2 November 1635 he was censured in the high commission at Lambeth for preaching against bowing at the name of Jesus and against the Book of Sports on the Lord's day, and for saying that religion and the gospel were in imminent danger. He was suspended from his ministry, enjoined to make a public submission and recantation, condemned in costs of suit, and committed to prison. His fellow-townsmen declined to ask the Bishop of Norwich to appoint another preacher, as they hoped to have Ward reappointed in spite of all censures.

Ferdinando Adams, a shoe-maker and churchwarden for St Mary-le-Tower inscribed the words “Is it not written My house shall be called of all nations a house of prayer, but ye have made it a den of thieves” on the south aisle of the church. Written in large black writing, this is a quote from the Gospel of Mark XI:17

Having at last obtained his release, Ward retired to Holland, where he first became a member of William Bridge's church at Rotterdam, and afterwards his colleague in pastoral work. Ward did not remain long in Holland, for in April 1638 he purchased the house which had been provided for him by the town of Ipswich in 1610. He died in March 1640, and was buried on the 8th of that month in the church of St. Mary-le-Tower, Ipswich.

A school, Samuel Ward Academy, is named in his honour in his home town of Haverhill.

== Works ==
Samuel Ward's works are:

- A Coal from the Altar to kindle the Holy Fire of Zeal, edited by Ambrose Wood, London, 1615; 3rd edit. 1618; 4th edit. 1622.
- Balme from Gilead: to recover Conscience, edited by Thomas Gataker, London, 1617, 1618.
- Jethro's Justice of Peace, edited by Nathaniel Ward, London, 1618, 1621, 1623.
- The Happiness of Practice, London, 1621, 1622, 1627.
- The Life of Faith in Death: exemplified in the living speeches of dying Christians, 2nd edit., London, 1621, 1622, 1625.
- All in All (Christ is all in all), London, 1622.
- Woe to Drunkards: a Sermon, London, 1622, 1624, 1627.
- A Peace-offering to God for the blessings we enjoy under his Majesties reign, with a Thanksgiving for the Princes safe return, London, 1624.
- The wonders of the load-stone, or, The load-stone newly reduc't into a divine and morall use, London, 1640.
- A most elegant and Religious Rapture [in verse] composed by Mr. Ward during his episcopal imprisonment. . . . Englished by John Vicars, Latin and English, London, 1649.

A collection of his Sermons and Treatises, in nine parts, was published at London in 1627–8, and again in 1636. They were reprinted at Edinburgh in 1862, edited by John Charles Ryle.
