= Johann Heinrich Alsted =

German Calvinist academic, 1588–1638

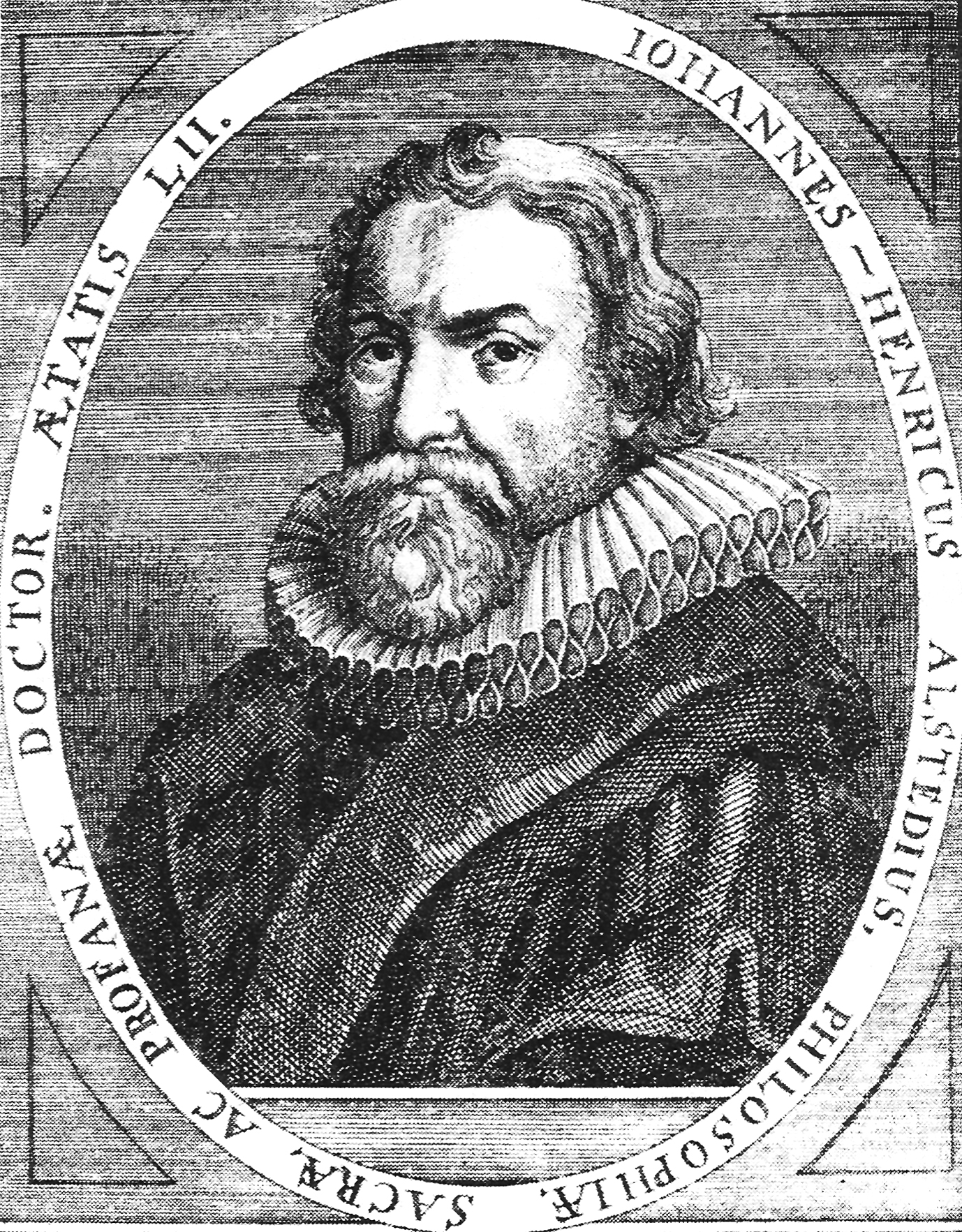
- 1610 drawing of Alsted
- Born: March 1588; Mittenaar, Holy Roman Empire
- Died: 9 November 1638 (aged 50); Gyulafehérvár, Principality of Transylvania

Philosophical work
- Era: Baroque philosophy
- Region: Western philosophy: German philosophy; Hungarian philosophy
- Notable students: János Apáczai Csere
- Main interests: Pedagogy, encyclopaedia writing
- Notable works: Encyclopaedia Cursus Philosophici

Johann Heinrich Alsted (March 1588 – November 9, 1638), "the true parent of all the Encyclopædias", was a German-born Transylvanian Saxon Calvinist minister and academic, known for his varied interests: in Ramism and Lullism, pedagogy and encyclopedias, theology and millenarianism. His contemporaries noted that an anagram of Alstedius was sedulitas, meaning "hard work" in Latin.

== Life ==
Alsted was born in Mittenaar. He was educated at Herborn Academy in the state of Hesse, studying under Johannes Piscator. From 1606 he was at the University of Marburg, taught by Rudolf Goclenius, Gregorius Schönfeld and Raphaël Egli. The following year he went to Basel, where his teachers were Leonhardt Zubler for mathematics, Amandus Polanus von Polansdorf for theology, and Johann Buxtorf. From about 1608 he returned to the Herborn Academy to teach as professor of philosophy and theology.

Alsted was later in exile from the Thirty Years' War in Transylvania, where he remained for the rest of his life. In 1629 he left war-torn Germany for Weißenburg (now Alba Iulia in Romania) to found a Calvinist Academy: the context was that the Transylvanian royal family had just returned from Unitarianism to Calvinism, and Alsted and Johannes Bisterfeld were German professors brought in to improve standards. Among the students there was János Apáczai Csere.

Alsted died in Alba Iulia in 1638.

== Works ==
=== Encyclopedist ===
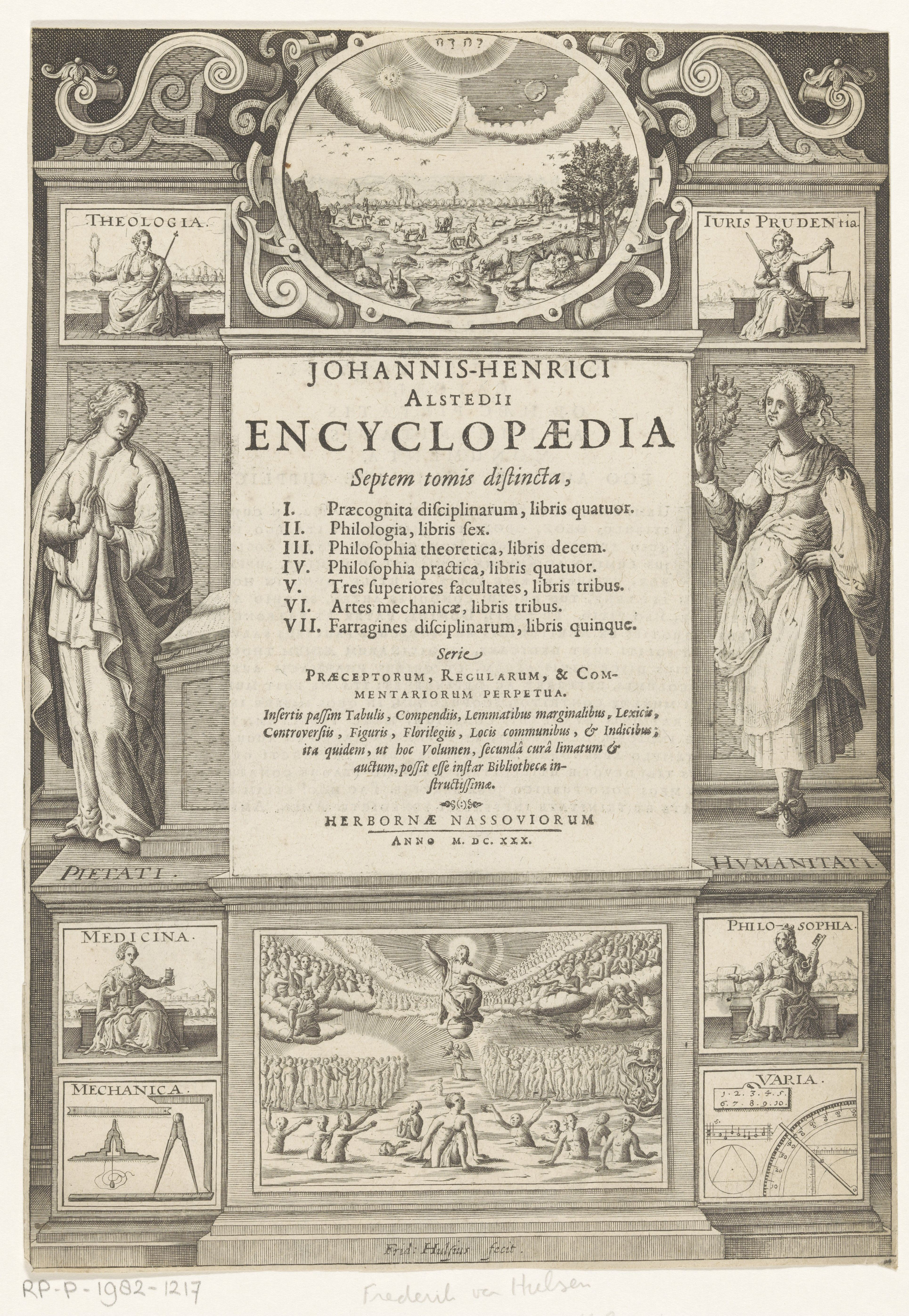
Johann Heinrich Alsted. Encyclopaedia Septem tomis distincta. Herborn: S.n., 1630

Alsted has been called 'one of the most important encyclopedists of all time'. He was a prolific writer, and his Encyclopaedia (1630) long had a high reputation. It was preceded by shorter works, including the 1608 Encyclopaedia cursus philosophici. His major encyclopedia of 1630, the Encyclopaedia, Septem Tomis Distincta, was divided into 35 books, and had 48 synoptical tables as well as an index. Alsted described it as "a methodical systemization of all things which ought to be learned by men in this life. In short, it is the totality of knowledge." In its time it was praised by Bernard Lamy and Cotton Mather, and it informed the work of Alsted's student John Amos Comenius. An unfinished encyclopedic project by Gottfried Wilhelm Leibniz began as a plan to expand and modernize it, and the famous diarist Samuel Pepys purchased a copy in 1660—thirty years after its initial publication. Although Jacob Thomasius criticised it for plagiarism for verbatim copying without acknowledgment, Augustus De Morgan later called it "the true parent of all the Encyclopædias, or collections of treatises, or works in which that character predominates".

The Cambridge History of Renaissance Philosophy, p. 632, in the context of Calvinist metaphysics, states

"In the works of authors like Clemens Timpler of Heidelberg and Steinfurt, Bartolomaeus Keckermann of Heidelberg and Danzig, and Johann Heinrich Alsted of Herborn there appeared a new, unified vision of the encyclopaedia of the scientific disciplines in which ontology had the role of assigning to each of the particular sciences its proper domain."

In his The New England Mind, Perry Miller writes about the Encyclopaedia:

"It was indeed nothing short of a summary, in sequential and numbered paragraphs, of everything that the mind of European man had yet conceived or discovered. The works of over five hundred authors, from Aristotle to James I, were digested and methodized, including those of Aquinas, Scotus, and medieval theology, as also those of medieval science, such as De Natura Rerum."

It was reissued as a 4-volume facsimile reprint, edited by W. Schmidt-Biggemann (Fromann-Holzboog Press, Stuttgart-Bad Cannstatt, 1989–1990).

==== Alstedius' Encyclopedia Biblica ====
In 1610, Alstedius published the first edition of his Encyclopedia. In 1630, he published a second edition in a much more comprehensive form, in two large folio volumes. In the second edition, he professes to reduce the several branches of art and science then known and studied into a system. In this work, and his Encyclopedia Biblica, he tries to prove that the foundation and materials of the whole can be found in the Sacred Scriptures. The first four books contain an exposition of the various subjects to be discussed. He devotes six books to philology, ten to speculative philosophy, and four to practical matters. Then follow three on theology, jurisprudence, and medicine; three on mechanical arts, and five on history, chronology, and miscellanies. This work exhibited a great improvement on other published works that purported to be encyclopedias in the latter half of the 16th and the first half of the 17th centuries.

=== Logician ===
Alsted published Logicae Systema Harmonicum (1614). In writing a semi-Ramist encyclopedia, he then applied his conception of logic to the sum of human knowledge. To do that, he added the Lullist topical art of memory to Ramist topical logic, indeed reversing one of the original conceptions of Ramus. He had a reputation in his own time as a distinctive methodologist. John Prideaux in 1639 asked:

Q. Is it true that the seven dialectical theories of method in use today, to wit, i) the Aristotelian, 2) the Lullian, 3) the Ramistic, 4) the Mixt, whether indeed in the manner of Keckermann or of Alsted, 5) the Forensic of Hotman, 6) the Jesuitic, and 7) the Socinian, differ mostly in respect to manner of treatment, not in respect to purpose?

To which the pupil's answer was to be "yes"; as it was to be to the question "Is it true that a Mixt ought to be preferred to a Peripatetic, a Ramist, a Lullian, and the others?" A "Mixt" took elements from both Aristotle and Ramus; Philippo-Ramists, who blended Melanchthon with Ramus, were a type of "Mixt"; "Systematics" were "Mixts" who followed Keckermann in a belief in system, as Alsted did.

=== Theologian ===
From his Transylvanian period dates Alsted's Prodromus (printed 1641, but dated 1635). The Prodromus was a Calvinist refutation of one of the most influential anti-Trinitarian works, De vera religione of Johannes Völkel. This work was a compendium of the arguments of Völkel's teacher Fausto Sozzini, figurehead of the Polish Unitarian movement.

== Publications ==
Alsted is now remembered as an encyclopedist, and for his millenarian views. His approach to the encyclopedia took two decades of preliminaries, and was an effort of integration of tools and theories to hand.

Sedulus in libris scribendis atque legendi	Alstedius nomen Sedulitatis habet	(Encyclopaedia Scientiarum Omnium, Leyden 1649, ad init.)

In 1609 Alsted published Clavis artis Lullianae. In 1610 he published the Artificium perorandi of Giordano Bruno; and in the same year the Panacea philosophica, an attempt to find the common ground in the work of Aristotle, Raymond Lull, and Petrus Ramus. In 1612 Alsted edited the Explanatio of Bernard de Lavinheta, a Lullist work. In 1613 he published an edition of the Systema systematum of Bartholomäus Keckermann. Theologia naturalis (1615) was an apologetical work of natural theology.

- Clavis artis lullianae (1609).
- Panacea philosophica (1610).
- Metaphysica, tribus libris tractata (1613).
- Methodus admirandorum mathematicorum completens novem libris matheseos universae (1613) Herbornae Nassoviarum:Johann Heinrich Alsted
- Logicae Systema Harmonicum (1614).
- Theologia naturalis (1615).
- Cursus Philosophici Encyclopediae Libris XXVII, 1620.
- Methodus sacrosanctae theologiae octo libris tradita in Quorum Hanau:Konrad Eifried
- Encyclopaedia septem tomis distincta: 1. Praecognita disciplinarum; 2. Philologia; 3. Philosophia theoretica; 4. Philosophia practica; 5. Tres superiores facultates; 6. Artes mechanicae; 7. Farragines disciplinarum (1630).
- Templum musicum (1664), OCLC 1070907097, 93 pp.

== See also ==
- Encyclopaedia Cursus Philosophici
