= Thomas Maxey (printer) =

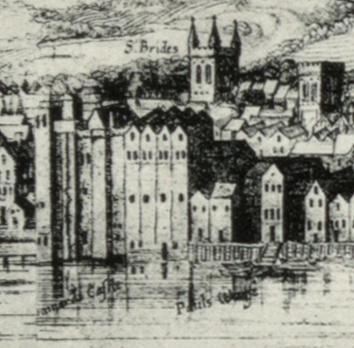
St Paul's Wharf in 1616, where Maxey's printshop was located

Thomas Maxey (died January 1657) was a prominent English printer active in seventeenth century London.

Maxey took up his Freedom of the City of London on 2 October 1637 and issued his first book 23 June 1640. His printshop was located at Paul's Wharf at that time in Castle Baynard Ward.

When he died in January 1657 he left his printshop to Anne Maxey.

== Books printed ==
He printed a number of significant books including:

- (1651) Reliquiae Wottonianae by Henry Wotton published by Richard Marriot
- (1652) Self-Deniall, opened and applyed in a sermon before the reverend assembly of Divines, on a day of their private humiliation by Edward Reynolds for Robert Bostock
- (1653) The Compleat Angler by Izaak Walton published by Richard Marriot
- (1657) The universal character, by which all the nations in the world may understand one anothers conceptions by Cave Beck published by William Weekly
- (1657) Mish?am A stay in trouble or The saints rest in the evil day, by Alexander Pringle of Harwich for William Weekly at Ipswich, and are to be sold by John Rothwel, at the Fountain in Goldsmiths-Row in Cheap-side, 1657
