= Bernard de Lavinheta =

- Died: c. 1530
- Education: Toulouse
- Occupations: Franciscan friar, scholar
- Era: Renaissance
- Known for: Teaching the methods of Raymond Lull
- Notable work: Explanatio compendiosaque applicatio artis Raymundi Lulli

Bernard de Lavinheta (died c. 1530) was a Basque Franciscan from Béarn, known as a teacher of the methods of Raymond Lull.

== Life ==
He studied at Toulouse and taught at Salamanca. Later he came to Paris.

== Works ==
His Explanatio compendiosaque applicatio artis Raymundi Lulli was published in 1523 in Lyon. It combined the theories of Lull with alchemy and an encyclopedic theory. Lavinheta also argues in it that the ars generalis of Lull is a memory technique that goes beyond the method of loci.

A new edition of his works was published in 1612 by Johann Heinrich Alsted, for Lazarus Zetzner.
