= Anne Maxwell (printer) =

English printer (??–1684)

Anne Maxwell (died 1684) was a prominent printer in seventeenth century London. She inherited a printing house from her husband, David, who died in 1665. She successfully ran this, producing at least 122 texts between 1665 and 1675.

== Anne Maxey ==
Anne married Thomas Maxey, who had printed his first book in 1640. Anne inherited his printshop located at Paul's Wharf, in the ward of Castle Baynard when he died in 1657. She was sufficiently proficient at running a printshop to print a number of books under the imprint A. Maxey., A.M.

- (1657) The Use and Practice of Faith by Matthew Lawrence published by William Weekly
- (1657) Mish'am A stay in trouble or The saints rest in the evil day, by Alexander Pringle of Harwich for William Weekly at Ipswich, and are to be sold by John Rothwel, at the Fountain in Goldsmiths-Row in Cheap-side, 1657

== Anne Maxwell ==
At some stage she married David Maxwell who had been apprenticed to her father. When he in turn died in 1664, she started publishing under the name Anne Maxwell, continuing to do so until 1684.
