= St Margaret's Church, Ipswich =

Coordinates: 52.06318°N 1.15742°E

- St Margaret's Church, Ipswich
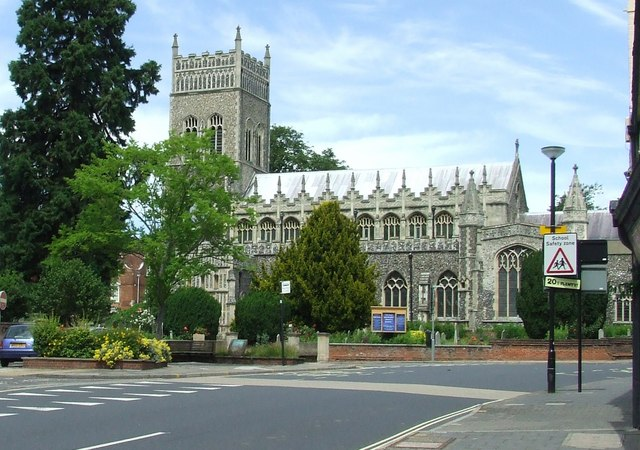
- St Margaret's Church as seen from St Margaret's Green

- Location in Suffolk
- OS grid reference: TM 166 441
- Location: Ipswich, Suffolk
- Country: England
- Denomination: Anglican
- Website: stmargaretsipswich.org.uk

History
- Founded: c.1300
- Dedication: St Margaret of Antioch

Architecture
- Heritage designation: Grade I
- Designated: 19 December 1951
- Architectural type: Church
- Style: Perpendicular Gothic

Specifications
- Materials: Flint with stone dressings

St Margaret's Church is a medieval church in Ipswich, Suffolk, England. It was built in around 1300 by the Augustinian canons of the adjacent Priory of the Holy Trinity to cater for the increasing population. The building and much of the congregation was located just outside the ramparts to the north of medieval Ipswich.

The building dates from the 15th century, but the tower was rebuilt in the 19th century.

== Architectural features ==
=== Roof ===
The hammerbeam roof dates from the fifteenth century, but a number of paintings were added in the late seventeenth century following the Glorious Revolution.

=== Church organ ===
The organ was bought in 1981. It had previously been installed in Holy Trinity Church, Bedford, but this church had become redundant in 1974. It was originally installed J. W. Walker & Sons Ltd in 1859. The organ was originally tuned to the Old Philharmonic pitch (A452.5). However this was deflated to the current ISO 16 Stuttgart pitch when the organ was cleaned and repaired in 2012–3.

== Gallery ==
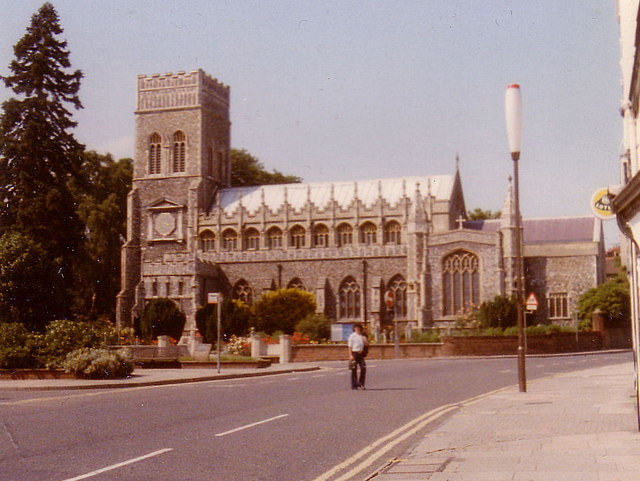
St. Margaret's Church, 1977

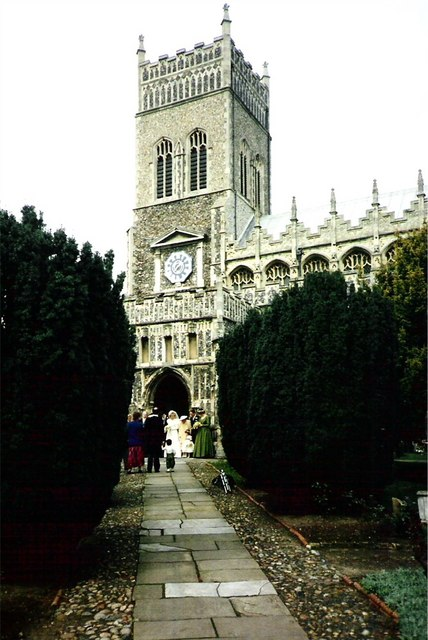
Wedding in 1989

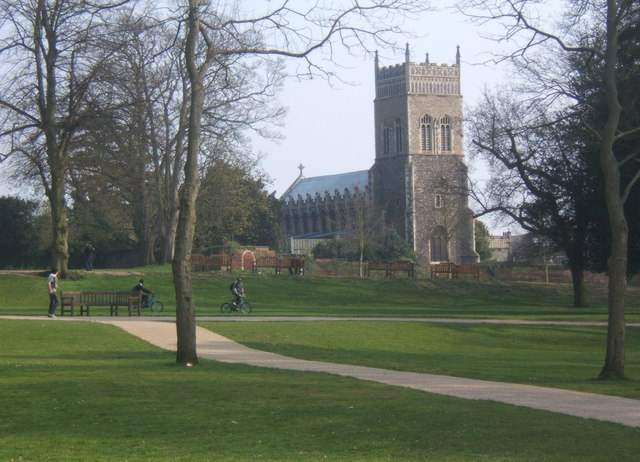
View from Christchurch Park, 2009

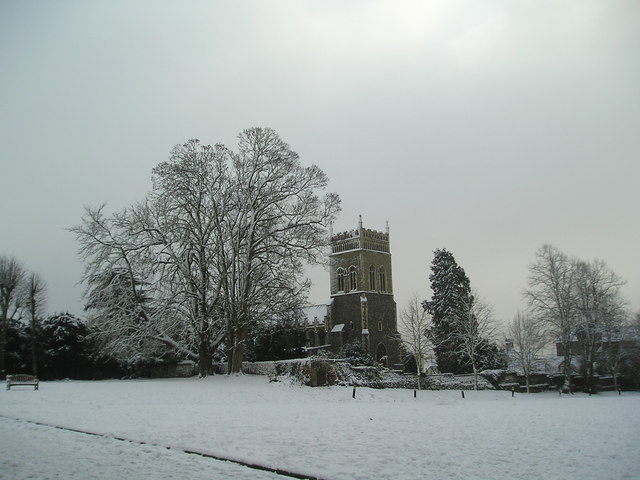
Winter view later that year

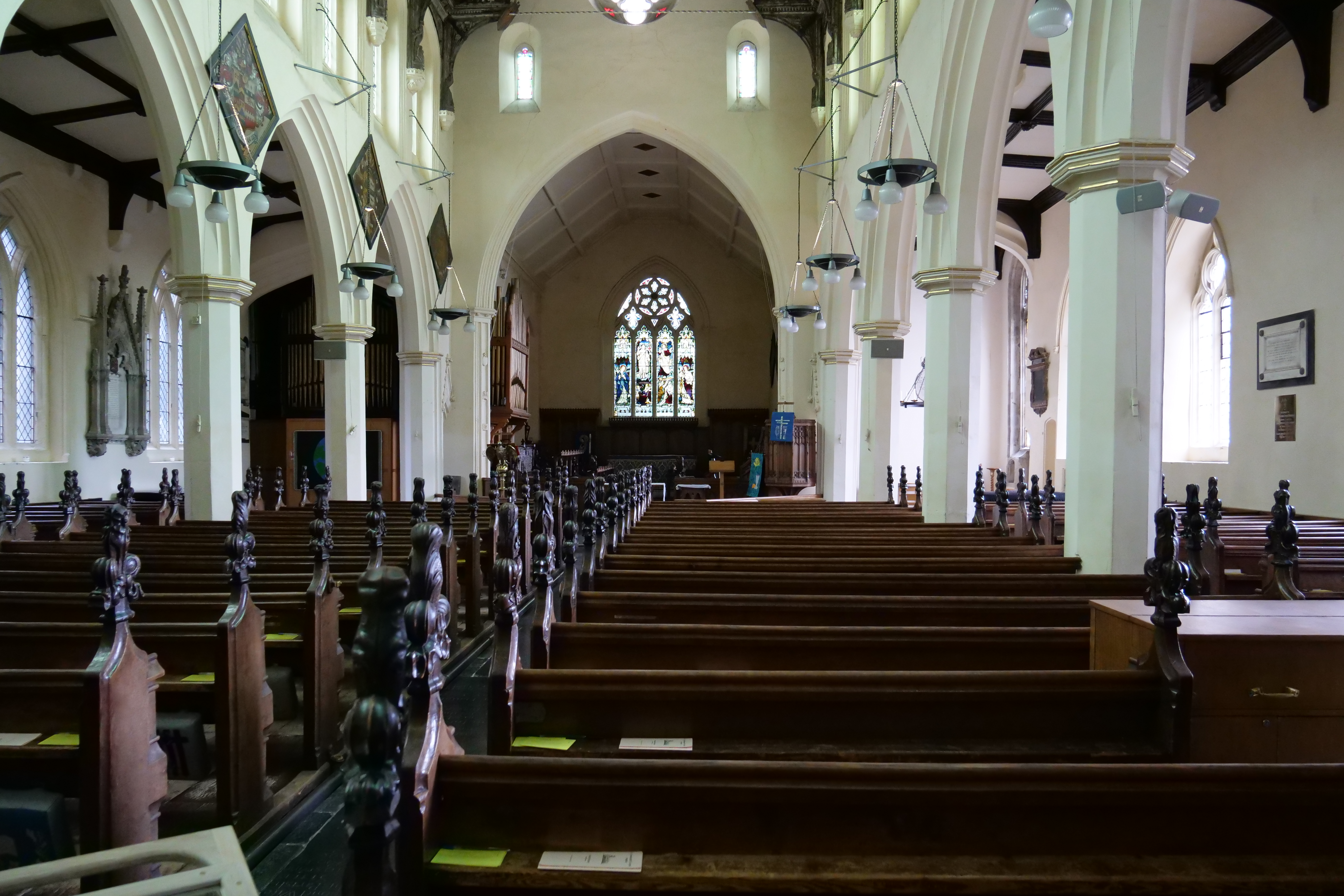
The nave in 2020

== Patronage ==
The Simeon Trustees have held the patronage of St Margaret's for a number of years. In 1867 they appointed Samuel Garratt as minister of the church.

=== Incumbents ===
The following people were incumbents of St Margarets since the abolition of the Priory of the Holy Trinity until 1994.

- 1547 John Slough
- 1547 William Swarston
- 1552 Thomas Pyknot
- 1555 Lawrence Wayterwarde
- 1557 John Goffe or Gough
- 1561 Thomas Bakelar
- 1581 Robert Norton, DD
- 1587 Thomas Carew
- 1592 John Baldwin
- 1595 John Gleson
- 1598 Edmund Galaway
- 1603 Thomas Carter
- 1621 Richard Burch
- 1624 George Turnbull
- 1633 William Geast
- 1649 Nicholas Stanton
- 1652 Tristram Rose
- 1652 Joseph Waite
- 1658 Cave Beck
- 1707 Edmund Beeston
- 1716 William Mathews
- 1725 John Gaudy
- 1726 Richard Brome
- 1763 William Cornwallis
- 1786 Charles Cornwallis
- 1798 Claude William Fonnereau
- 1805 Charles William Fonnereau LLB
- 1840 George Murray
- 1854 John Owen
- 1867 Samuel Garratt, MA
- 1895 Percival Smith
- 1899 Arthur Lillingston MA
- 1905 Henry Williamson MA
- 1923 George Irwin BD
- 1923 Robert KnoxMA
- 1929 Frederick Millar MA
- 1939 Thomas Battersby MA
- 1959 Howard Marks MA
- 1971 Christopher Gane MA
- 1988 John Mockford MA
- 1994 David Cutts, BSc BA
