= Paul's Wharf =

Coordinates: 51.51069963912706°N 0.09844650770857967°W

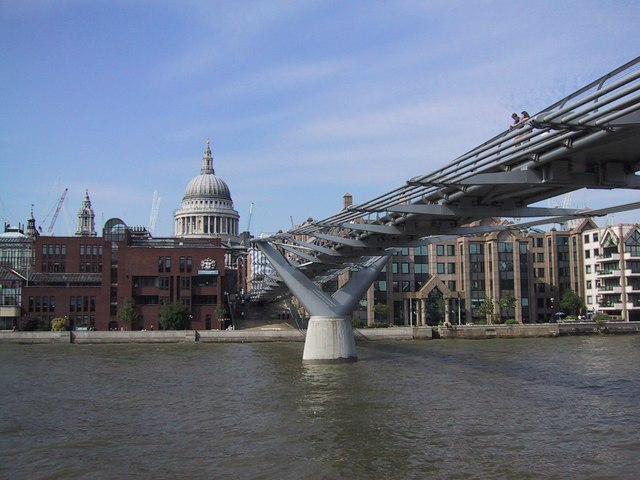
Paul's Wharf viewed from across the Thames

Paul's Wharf is a waterside hythe in the City of London historically located between Upper Thames Street and the River Thames. Originally part of Castle Baynard ward, Paul's Wharf is now located in Queenhithe. It constitutes the northern river bank underneath the Millennium Bridge.
