= Ipswich Town Preacher =

The Ipswich Town Preacher, sometimes called the Town Lecturer, was an appointment made by the bailiffs, burgesses and commonality of the Ipswich Corporation, England. The post was created in 1560, the second year of Queen Elizabeth I's reign. The first Town Preacher was Roger Kelke who had been a Marian exile, spending some time in Zurich, returning to Cambridge in 1558. Kelke was appointed Lady Margaret Preacher in August, a post which required him to annually deliver six sermons at certain specified places in Lincolnshire and Cambridgeshire. James Bass Mullinger suggests that "it was perhaps owing to the reputation he thus acquired that in 1560 he was appointed by the corporation of Ipswich, where the doctrines which he favoured largely prevailed, town preacher or lecturer." Nevertheless, on 9 July 1565 he faced an unsuccessful challenge when he was denounced by a group of burgesses at a court of the corporation as "a liar" and "a preacher of noe trewe doctrine".

== List of Ipswich Town Preachers ==
G. R Clarke provides a list of Ipswich Town Preachers prior to Samuel Ward taking the role: John Blatchly provides a further list up until 1663.

- 1560 Dr Colse (i.e. Kelke)
- 1576 Dr Norton
- 1582 Mr Pemberton
- 1585 Mr Wright
- 1591 Dr John Burges(s)
- 1602 Dr Reeves
- 1604 Mr John Askewe
- 1605 Samuel Ward
- 1640 Nathaniel Smart
- 1643 Matthew Lawrence
- 1652 Stephen Marshall
- 1655 Cave Beck
- 1656 Benjamin Brunning
