= Sidrach Simpson =

English Independent minister

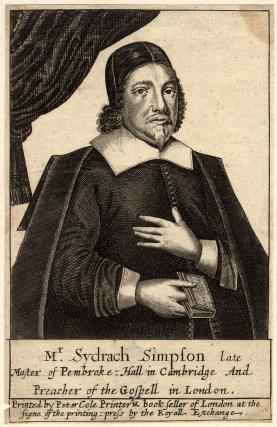
Sidrach Simpson

Sidrach Simpson (c.1600-1655) was an English Independent minister, one of the leaders of the Independent faction in the Westminster Assembly.

== Life ==
Sidrach Simpson came from Lincolnshire. He was educated as a sizar at Emmanuel College and Queens' College, Cambridge.

After losing his Church of England status under William Laud, he spent time as a minister in the Netherlands. In the Westminster Assembly he was one of the "Five Dissenting Brethren" putting their names to the An Apologeticall Narration presented to Parliament on 3 January 1644. The others in the group were William Bridge, Jeremiah Burroughs, Thomas Goodwin and Philip Nye, all with a comparable Dutch background as ministers (Burroughs and Simpson both in Rotterdam), and united in a form of Congregationalism He was also in the group of ten, dominated by Independents, condemning in 1652 the Racovian Catechism, with Nye and Bridge, six further Independents, John Dury, and Adoniram Byfield.

He became Master of Pembroke Hall, Cambridge in 1650, but was drifting in his last years to the outer extremes in his positions. He was preoccupied with his concurrent post as rector in London, at St Mary Abchurch, and then from 1653 at St Bartholomew-by-the-Exchange. Oliver Cromwell had him imprisoned for aggressive preaching.

== Notes ==
Academic offices
Preceded by Richard Vines	Master of Pembroke College, Cambridge; 1650–1655	Succeeded by William Moses
