= Adam Steuart =

Scottish philosopher and controversialist

Adam Steuart (Stuart, Stewart) (1591–1654) was a Scottish philosopher and controversialist.

== Life ==
He became professor at the Academy of Saumur in 1617. In 1644, he was in London, where he engaged in propaganda for the Presbyterians against the Independents. The first attack on the Apologeticall Narration of the Five Dissenting Brethren was Steuart's. The Second Part of the Duply to M. S. alias Two Brethren addressed the issue of religious tolerance, which he classed with depravity. It was answered by John Goodwin. Steuart is mentioned (as A. S.) in John Milton's poem On the New Forcers of Conscience under the Long Parliament, a caudate sonnet, along with Samuel Rutherford and Thomas Edwards (and, implicitly, Robert Baillie).

In 1644 he took up a position as Professor of Physics at the University of Leiden . With Jacobus Triglandius and Jacobus Revius he attacked Cartesianism there. In what is now known as the Leiden Crisis, coming to a head in 1647, he opposed Adriaan Heereboord, over whom he had been brought in, and presided at a rowdy debate with the Leiden Cartesian Johannes de Raey. René Descartes himself commented on Steuart, in Notae in Programma Quoddam (1648), to which Steuart replied in Notae in notas nobilissimi cujusdam viri in ipsius theses de Deo (1648). Steuart's party, the proponents of continuing to teach along the lines of Aristotelian philosophy, won a temporary victory.

He was attacked by the theologian Samuel Maresius, during further controversy, as heterodox. He died in Leiden.
