= Elizabeth Penington =

- Born: 1604/5; Essex
- Died: 1642-1645
- Education: no formal education
- Occupations: letter writer and patron
- Known for: her letters
- Spouse: Daniel Penington

Elizabeth Penington born Elizabeth Rizby (1604/5 – 1642-1645) was an English pious laywoman and letter writer (bap. 1604/5, d. 1642x5). Patron of Johann Heinrich Hummel

== Life ==
Penington was probably born in Essex as she was baptised in 1604 or 1605 in All Saints' Church in Stock, Essex. Her parents were very probably Elizabeth (born Bridges) and William Risby. Her father was rich enough to arrange for £1,000 to be distributed to good people and causes.

She married Daniel Penington who came from a well connected family. Her husband's elder brother, Isaac, would be Lord Mayor of London and die a traitor. Isaac's descendants were notable Quakers. Daniel and Isaac were both shareholders in the East India Company and members of the Worshipful Company of Fishmongers. More particularly Daniel also received £150 a year in rents from property he owned.

She and her husband became patrons of Johann Heinrich Hummel after they met him at church in 1634. Hummel could read English and he had already preached at Clapham in English. He moved into their household where he was informally adopted into the family of daughters. Elizabeth and her husband looked after him and paid for visits that he made to Oxford and Cambridge.

Hummel returned to Switzerland but he kept in close contact with the Peningtons. Elizabeth would send letters and books. She sent books by leadsing puritan writers and in some cases books that had only recently been published to Hummel. English theologians were very well regarded in Switzerland. Hummel received works by writers including William Gouge and Jeremiah Burroughes. In time Hummel would be amongst those who translated the influential works like these into German.

== Private life ==
She and Daniel had at least nine children, but only one daughter survived to be an adult.
