= An Apologeticall Narration =

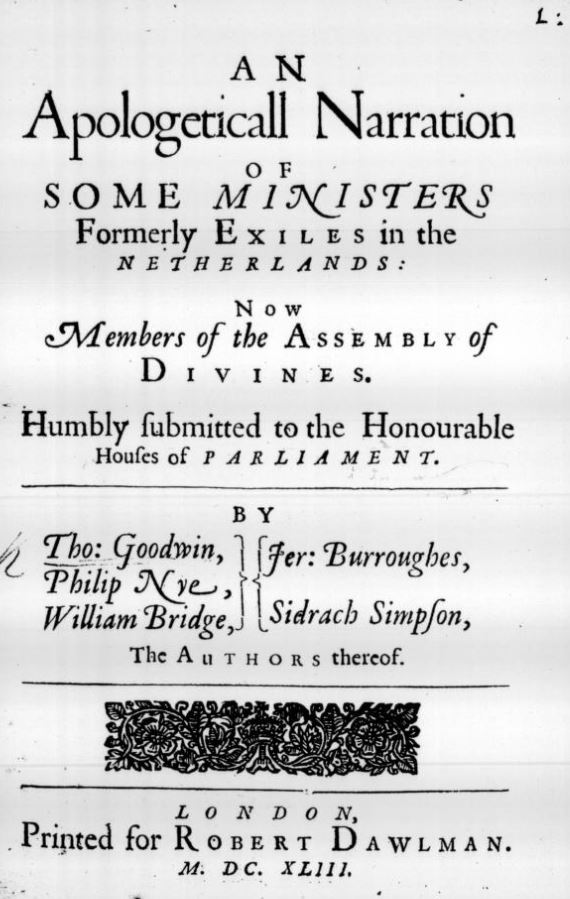
Title page, "An Apologeticall Narration"

An Apologeticall Narration, Hvmbly svbmitted to the Honourable Houses of Parliament. By Tho: Goodwin, Philip Nye, Sidrach Simpson, Jer: Burroughes, William Bridge. London, Printed for Robert Dawlman, M.DC.XLIII. [1643] was a theological tract submitted by five Independent preachers to the English Parliament on 3 January 1644 as a part of the debates taking place during the Westminster Assembly.

An Apologeticall Narration was written by Thomas Goodwin, Philip Nye, Sidrach Simpson, Jeremiah Burroughs, and William Bridge, sometimes referred to collectively as the "Five Dissenting Brethren." The five authors had all been exiled in Holland in the 1630s and had links to the New England churches.

The pamphlet can be seen as a manifesto of congregationalism, under which churches would be independently organised, although maintaining fraternal links. The two biggest evils for these Congregationalists (or Independents) were sectarianism and intolerance (although there were some limits to tolerance). But while arguing for some measure of congregationalist independence, the pamphlet also aimed to reassure the presbyterian majority that the gathering of independent churches would not create ecclesiastical disorder. Thus, the authors maintained, it was not necessary to secure uniformity in the new constitution of the Church of England. This conciliatory tone accounts for the harsh judgements on the separatists and the Brownists.

== Impact ==
Despite the book deliberately seeking a moderate, indeed "apologeticall," tone, it launched an enormous amount of printed debate that definitively split the godly community into the presbyterian and independent factions. This included a rebuttal by Adam Steuart, published in February, and a longer Antapologia by Thomas Edwards the same year.

English historian Veronica Wedgwood argues that submitting the tract directly to Parliament, rather than the Westminster Assembly, was an effective way of bringing the authors' point of view to a wider public without exposing it to contest in the Assembly, where it would have faced being out-argued and they themselves would have been outnumbered.

== See also ==
- Savoy Declaration
