= Joseph Symonds (pastor) =

English pastor and puritan

Joseph Symonds (d. 1652) was an English Pastor and puritan.

== Career ==
When Joseph Symonds was a young man he was assistant to Thomas Gataker at Rotherhithe. He was appointed rector of St. Martin's Ironmonger-lane, London, in 1632. He was persecuted by Archbishop Laud for adopting the church government views of the Independents. Symonds took refuge in the Netherlands in 1639, where he along with William Bridge and Jeremiah Burroughs was appointed pastor of an English-speaking congregation at Rotterdam.

Symonds returned to England in 1647 and was appointed as a minister in John Goodwin's congregation on 1 March. On the same year he became the vice president and fellow of Eton College which office he held until his death in 1652.
