= Joseph Symonds (disambiguation) =

Joseph Symonds might refers to the following individuals:

- Joseph Symonds (pastor) (died 1652), British pastor and Puritan
- Joseph W. Symonds (1840-1918), American judge and a justice of Maine Supreme Judicial Court
- Joseph B. Symonds (1900-1985), British politician and Member of Parliament
