= The Reasonableness of Christianity =

The Reasonableness of Christianity is an influential book written in 1695 by John Locke arguing in part for the use of empiricism to the Bible.

== Background ==
The Reasonableness of Christianity, as delivered in the Scriptures is a thoughtful step by step review of how human reason can highlight through God's Word in the Bible, a firm understanding of what The Word means. In the book Locke highlights how he is in agreement with both Augustine and Aquinas in the role that miracles can play in the discovery of deeper meaning. Locke further wrote about his views on miracles in the essay A Discourse on Miracles.

Locke's argument originates with the idea that through Revelation, humanity can discover self-evident truths such as Natural Law which governs how men should conduct themselves in a civil society.

Upon publication, the book was controversial for its stance on the Trinity which is omitted, and the book drew significant criticism from other leading theologians such as Edward Stillingfleet, Jonas Proast, and John Edwards, even though Locke is not known to have ever publicly denied the Trinity. Conversely the book had many supporters and defenders, such as John Tillotson, Samuel Clarke, and John Leland.
