= William Gouge =

English clergyman and author (1575–1653)

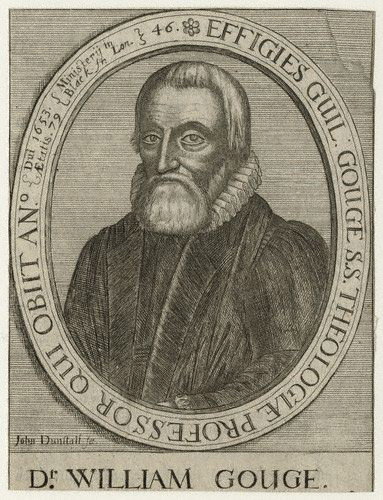
William Gouge, 1654 engraving by John Dunstall.

William Gouge (1575–1653) was an English Puritan clergyman and author. He was a minister and preacher at St Ann Blackfriars for 45 years, from 1608, and a member of the Westminster Assembly from 1643.

== Life ==
He was born in Stratford-le-Bow, Middlesex, and baptised on 6 November 1575. He was educated at Felsted, St. Paul's School, Eton College, and King's College, Cambridge. He graduated B.A. in 1598 and M.A. in 1601.

Before moving to London, he was a Fellow and lecturer at Cambridge, where he caused a near-riot by his advocacy of Ramism over the traditional methods of Aristotle. (This story about Gouge, who lectured on logic, is related in Wilbur Samuel Howell's Logic and Rhetoric in England 1500–1700 (1956) as an account from Samuel Clarke, and is not reliably dated.)

At Blackfriars, he was initially assistant to Stephen Egerton (c.1554–1622), taking over as lecturer.

He proposed an early dispensational scheme. He took an interest in Sir Henry Finch's Calling of the Jews, and published it under his own name; this led to a spell of imprisonment in 1621, since the publication displeased James I of England.

Already nearly 70 years old, he attended the Westminster Assembly regularly, and was made chairman in 1644 of the committee set up to draft the Westminster Confession. The other original members of the committee were John Arrowsmith, Cornelius Burges, Jeremiah Burroughs, Thomas Gataker, Thomas Goodwin, Joshua Hoyle, Thomas Temple, and Richard Vines He was appointed as an Assessor on 26 November 1647. He was appointed prolocutor of the Provincial Assembly of London on 3 May 1647.

== Of Domesticall Duties and the family ==
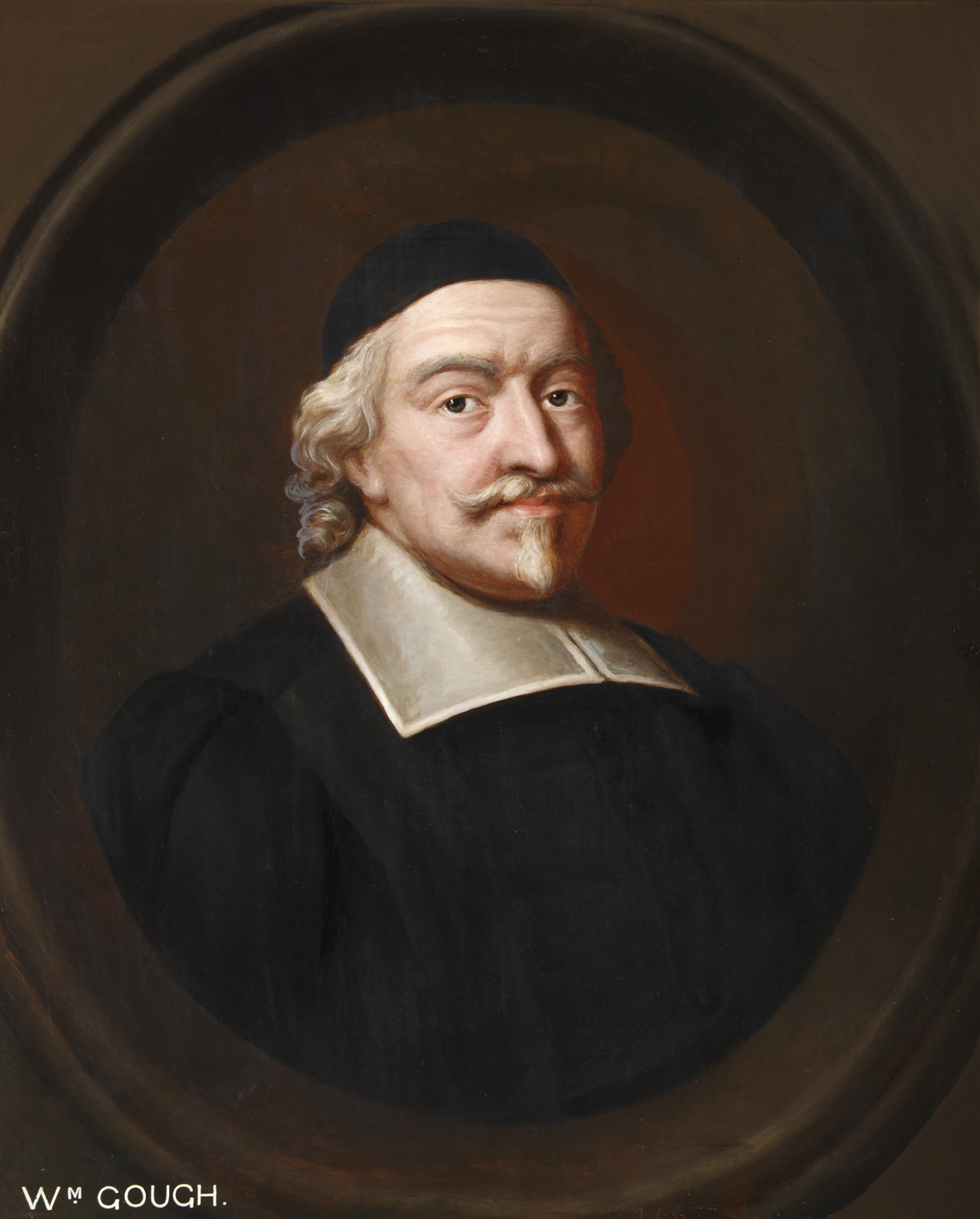

Of Domesticall Duties (1622) was a popular and thorough text of its time discussing family life. It argued that the wife although above the children is below the husband and the father figure "is a king in his owne house", and was an important conduct book of its period, running to later editions. He considered adultery equally bad in both genders, and encouraged love matches.

Gouge himself was father to 13 children. His wife Elizabeth, née Calton, died shortly after the birth of the last of them. They had married in the early 17th century, in effect by arrangement, when Gouge was put under pressure by his family. Elizabeth had been brought up by the wife of an Essex minister, John Huckle, and was eulogised after her death.

== Other writings ==
According to Ann Thompson, The Whole Armor of God (1616) illustrates the shift from "transcendent faith" in William Perkins and Samuel Ward, to "immanent faith" in a succeeding generation of Puritan writers.

In God's Three Arrows: Plague, Famine, Sword (1625 and 1631), he mentioned the idea that plague finds victims in poorer people, because they are more easily spared. They should not be allowed to flee affected areas, and nor should magistrates and the aged; but others may properly do so. In common with other Protestant theologians of the time, he supported the idea of holy war.

His massive Commentary on the Whole Epistle to the Hebrews appeared in 1655 in three volumes, replete with detail and sermon outlines. It was seen into print by his eldest son, Thomas Gouge (c.1605–1681), It was reprinted by James Nichol of Edinburgh in 1866.

== Works ==
- The Whole Armor of God (1616)
- Of Domestical Duties (1622)
- A Guide to Goe to God: or, an Explanation of the Perfect Patterne of Prayer, the Lords prayer. (1626)
- The dignitie of chiualrie (1626) sermon to the Artillery Company of London
- A Short Catechism (1635)
- A Recovery from Apostacy (1639)
- The Sabbath's Sanctification (1641)
- The Saint's Support (1642) fast sermon in Parliament
- The Progress of Divine Providence (1645)
- Commentary on the Whole Epistle to the Hebrews (1655)

== Family ==
Five of his uncles were noted Puritans: Laurence Chaderton and William Whitaker married sisters of his mother, while Nathaniel, Samuel and Ezekiel Culverwell were her brothers. His cousin, Mary Culverwell, married Ezekiel Cheever.
