= John Edwards (divine) =

English Calvinistic divine (1637–1716)

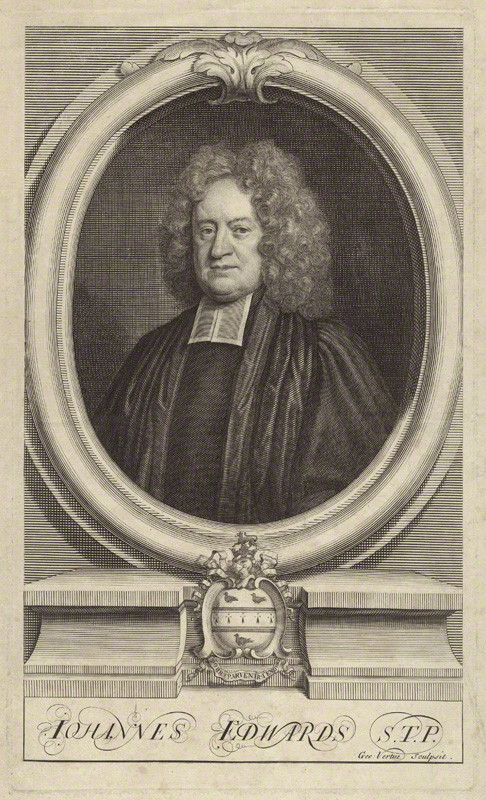

John Edwards (1637–1716) was an English Calvinistic divine.

== Early life ==
Edwards was the second son of Thomas Edwards, author of Gangræna. He was born at Hertford 26 February 1637, and admitted into Merchant Taylors' School at the age of ten.

Having spent seven years there under Mr. Dugard's care, he was appointed (10 March 1653-4) sizar of St. John's College, Cambridge, which at that time was under the presidency of Anthony Tuckney, a presbyterian. Edwards's conduct and proficiency secured him a scholarship, and before (as well as after) graduating he was appointed a moderator in the schools. In 1657 he was admitted B.A., elected fellow 23 March 1658-9, and proceeded to the degree of M.A. in 1661.

== Church life ==
Soon afterwards he was ordained deacon by Robert Sanderson, bishop of Lincoln, who at the same time engaged him to preach a sermon at the next ordination. In 1664 he took the charge of Trinity Church, Cambridge, where his preaching - plain, practical, and temperate - attracted notice, and he won the good opinion of his parishioners during an outbreak of plague.

A few years later, having taken the degree of B.D., he was chosen lecturer of Bury St. Edmunds, but retained the office only twelve months, preferring college life. His position, however, at St. John's became untenable on account of his Calvinistic views. As he met no sympathy from the master, he resigned his fellowship and entered Trinity Hall as a fellow commoner, performing the regular exercises in civil law. But the parishioners of St. Sepulchre's, Cambridge having invited him to be their minister, he resumed his clerical functions, and about the same time married the widow of Alderman Lane, who had been a successful attorney in the town. After declining other preferment he was presented (1683) to the vicarage of St. Peter's, Colchester, a benefice which he retained some three years until declining health and waning popularity induced him to seek retirement in a Cambridgeshire village, and to make the press, rather than the pulpit the means of diffusing his opinions.

In 1697 he was once more in Cambridge. In 1699 he took the degree of D.D., and until the close of his long life, which occurred on 16 April 1716, devoted himself to study and to the publication of theological works. He was left a widower in 1701, and soon afterwards married Catherine Lane (niece of his first wife's husband), who survived until 1745.

== Bibliography ==
His Socinians' Creed was intended to controvert John Locke's 'The Reasonableness of Christianity, as declared in the Scriptures'. Thomas Hearne alleged that Edwards tried to take credit as the author of "The Preservative against Socinianism," written by Dr. Jonathan Edwards, principal of Jesus College.

- 'The Plague of the Heart,' a sermon, Cambridge, 1665, 4to.
- 'Cometomantia: a Discourse of Comets [by J. E.?],' 1684, 8vo.
- 'A Demonstration of the Existence and Providence of God, from the Contemplation of the Visible Structure of the Greater and Lesser World,' 1600, 8vo.
- 'An Inquiry into Four Remarkable Texts of the New Testament [Matt. ii. 23, 1 Cor. xi. 14, xv. 29, 1 Peter iii. 19, 20],' Cambridge, 1692, 8vo.
- 'A Further Inquiry into certain Remarkable Texts,' London, 1692, 8vo.
- 'A Discourse on the Authority, Stile, and Perfection of the Books of the Old and New Testament,' 3 vols. 1693-5, 8vo.
- 'Some Thoughts concerning the several Causes and Occasions of Atheism, especially in the Present Age, with some brief Reflections on Sociniunism and on a late Book entituled The Reasonableness of Christianity as delivered in the Scriptures, ' London, 1695, 4to.
- 'Socinianism Unmask'd,' London, 1696, 8vo.
- 'The Socinian Creed,' London, 1697, 8 vo.
- 'Brief Remarks on Mr. Whiston's new Theory of the Earth,' 1697, 8vo.
- 'A Brief Vindication of the Fundamental Articles of the Christian Faith,... from Mr. Lock's Reflections upon them in his Book of Education,' &c., 1697, 8vo.
- 'Sermons on Special Occasions and Subjects,' 1698, 8vo.
- 'πηλυποικλος εοψια, a Compleat History of all Dispensations and Methods of Religion,' 2 vols. London, 1699, 8vo.
- 'The Eternal and Intrinsick Reasons of Good and Evil,' a sermon, Cambridge, 1699, 4to.
- 'A Free but Modest Censure on the late Controversial Writings and Debates of Mr. Edwards and Mr. Locke,' 1698, 4to.
- 'A Plea for the late Mr. Baxter, in Answer to Mr. Lobb's Charge of Socinianism,' 1699, 8vo.
- 'Concio et Determinatio pro gradu Doctoratus in Sacra Theologia,' Cantab., 1700, 12mo.
- 'A Free Discourse concerning Truth and Error, especially in matters of Religion,' 1701, 8vo.
- 'Exercitations... on several Important Places ... of the Old and New Testaments,' 1702, 8vo.
- 'The Preacher, a discourse showing what are the particular Offices and Employments of those of that character in the Church,' 3 parts, London, 1705-7, 8vo.
- 'The Heinousness of England's Sins,' a sermon, 1707, 8vo.
- 'One Nation; one King,' sermon on the union of England and Scotland, 1707, 8vo.
- 'Veritas Redux: Evangelical Truths Restored,' 3 vols. London, 1707-8, 1725–6, fol. and 8vo.
- Sermon on War, 1708, 8vo.
- 'Four Discourses,... being a Vindication of my Annotations from the Doctor's [Whitby] Cavils,' 1710, 8vo.
- 'The Divine Perfections Vindicated,' 1710, 8vo.
- 'Great Things done for our Ancestors,' a sermon, 1710, 8vo.
- 'The Arminian Doctrines condemn'd by the Holy Scripture, in Answer to Dr. Whitby,' 1711, 8vo.
- 'A Brief Discourse [on Rev. ii. 4–5],' 1711, 8vo.
- 'Some Brief Observations on Mr. Whiston's late Writings,' 1712, 8vo.
- 'Some Animadversions on Dr. Clarke's Scripture-Doctrine of the Trinity,' 1712, 8vo.
- A supplement to the above, 1713, 8vo.
- 'Theologia Reformata,' 2 vols. 1713, fol.
- 'How to judge aright of the Former and Present Times,' accession sermon, 17 14, 4to.
- 'Some Brief Critical Remarks on Dr. Clarke's last papers,' 1714, 8vo.
- 'Some New Discoveries of Uncertainty, Deficiency, and Corruptions of Human Knowledge, &c., 1714, 8vo.
- 'The Doctrines controverted between Papists and Protestants... Considered,' 1724, 8vo.
- 'A Discourse concerning the True Import of the words Election and Reprobation,' 1735, 8vo.
