= Adriaan Heereboord =

Dutch philosopher (1613–1661)

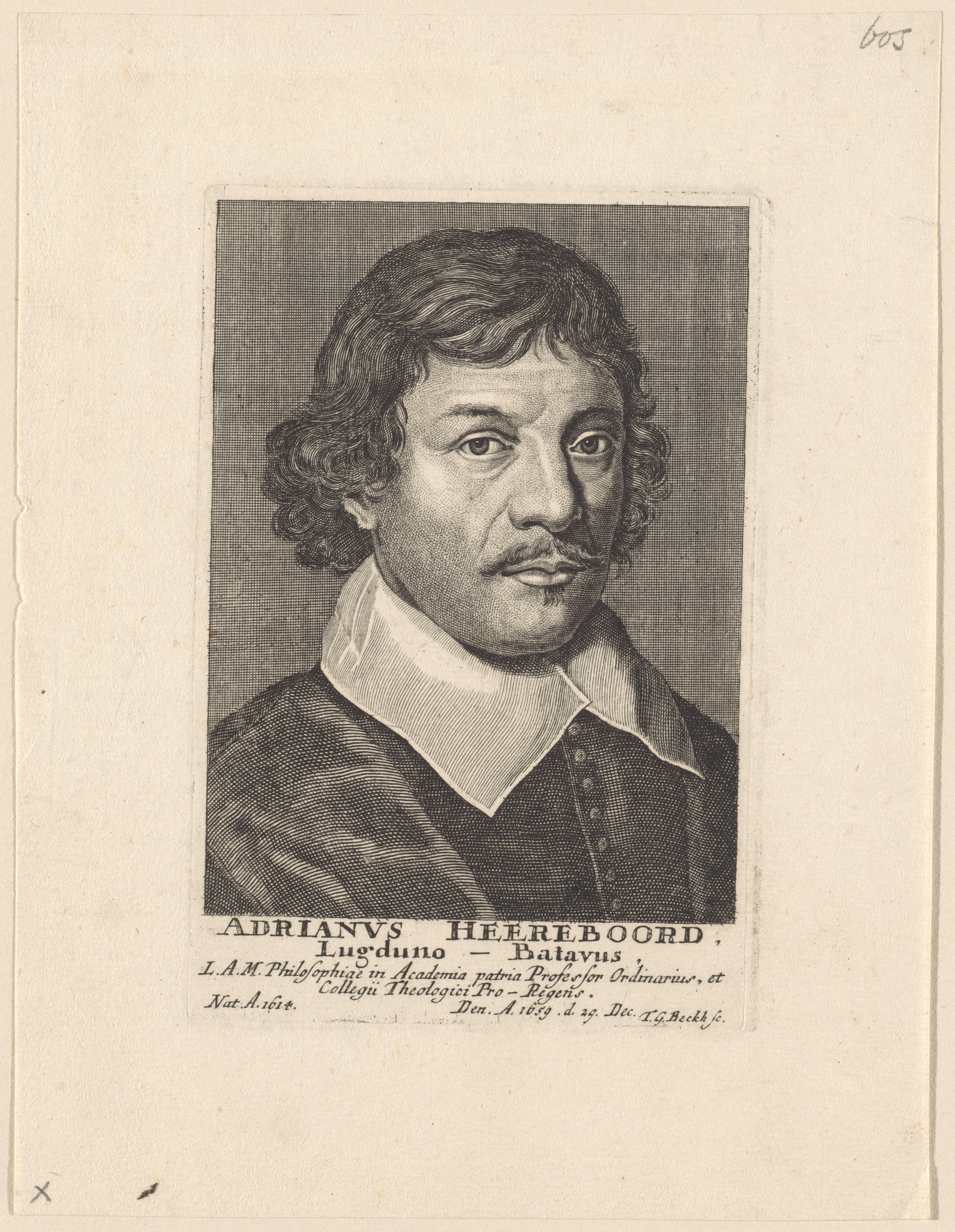
Adriaan Heereboord

Adriaan Heereboord (13 October 1613 in Leiden – 7 July 1661 in Leiden) was a Dutch philosopher and logician.

== Life ==
He was born in Leiden and graduated from the University of Leiden, where he had the chair of philosophy from 1643.

Heereboord sympathised with the new thinking of René Descartes, but was also influenced by Petrus Ramus and Francis Bacon. He clashed almost immediately at Leiden with Jacobus Revius and Adam Steuart, standing respectively for traditional metaphysics and theology. A combative drinker, Heereboord became an embattled figure in the university, with his private life the subject of pamphlets, and in the end dropped out of his duties.

== Works ==
His major works include:

- Collegium ethicum (Leiden, 1648)
- Sermo extemporaneus, de recta philosophice disputandi ratione (Leiden, 1648)
- Collegium logicum (Leiden, 1649)
- Collegium physicum (Leiden, 1649)
- Hermeneia logica: Seu explicatio ... Synopseos logicae Burgersdicianae (London, 1651 and possibly earlier)
- Meletemata philosophica (Leiden, 1654) at Gallica
- Philosophia naturalis, moralis, rationalis (Leiden, 1654)
- Philosophia naturalis, cum commentariis (Oxford, 1665)
- Pneumatica, tum theorematibus, tum commentariis (n.pl., 1659)

Heereboord also produced an edition of Jan Makowski's Metaphysica (Leiden, 1651). Among his other works is said to be a Parallelismus Aristotelicae et Cartesianae Philosophiae naturalis (1643; not traced).
