= Jerusalem Chamber =

Room in Westminster Abbey

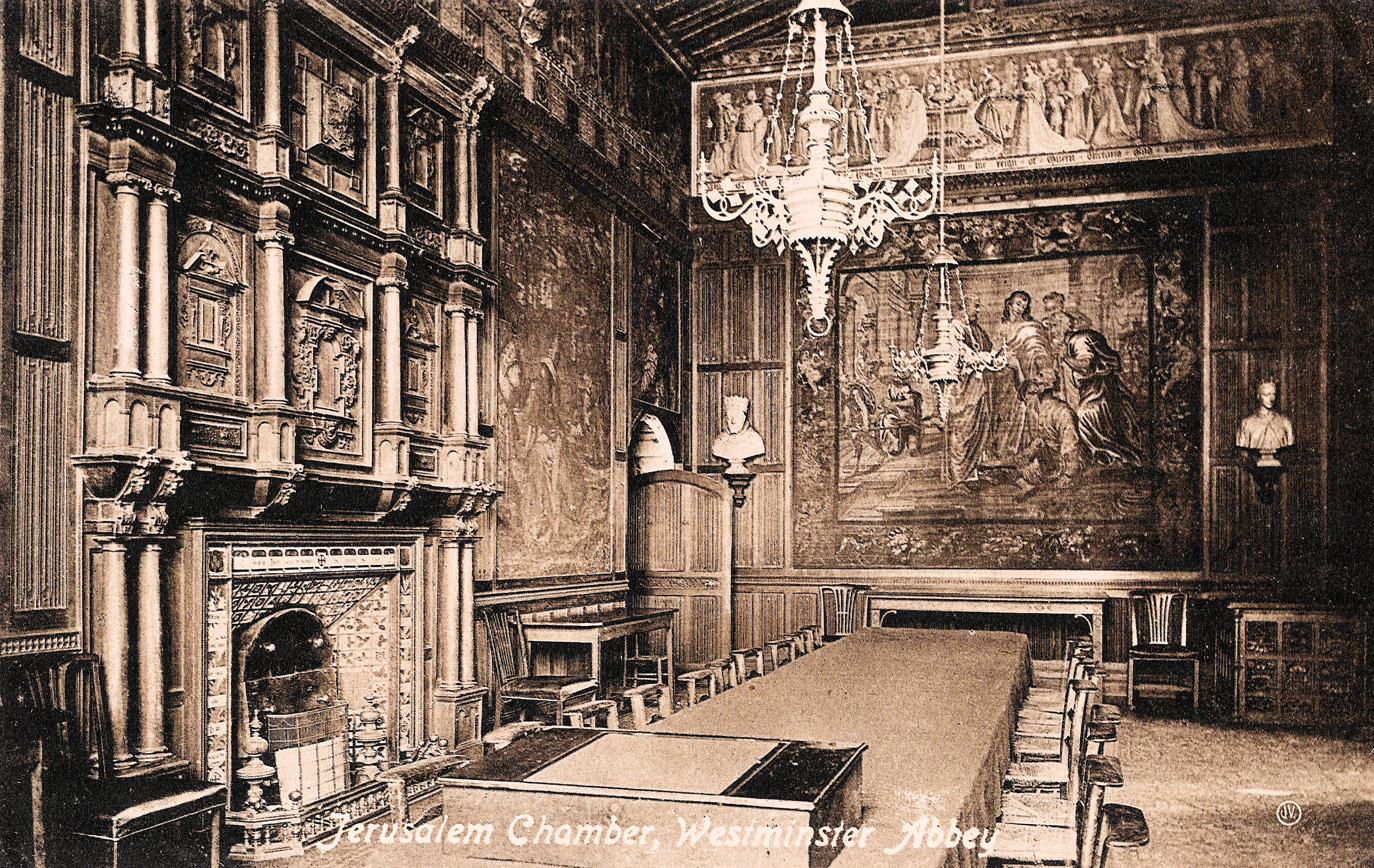
Photograph of the Jerusalem Chamber circa 1914

The Jerusalem Chamber is a room in what was formerly the abbot's house of Westminster Abbey. The room overlooks the main west door of the abbey. It was added in the fourteenth century. The abbot's house was made the deanery when the monastery was dissolved in 1540.

Henry IV of England died in the Jerusalem Chamber on 20 March 1413, and the Committee to write the King James Version of the Bible met there in 1611. The Upper House of Convocation often met there, and the Westminster Assembly met there from the Winter of 1643 until its dissolution.

The Jerusalem Chamber is referenced in act IV of William Shakespeare’s play Henry IV, Part 2.
