= Gangraena =

1646 book by Thomas Edwards

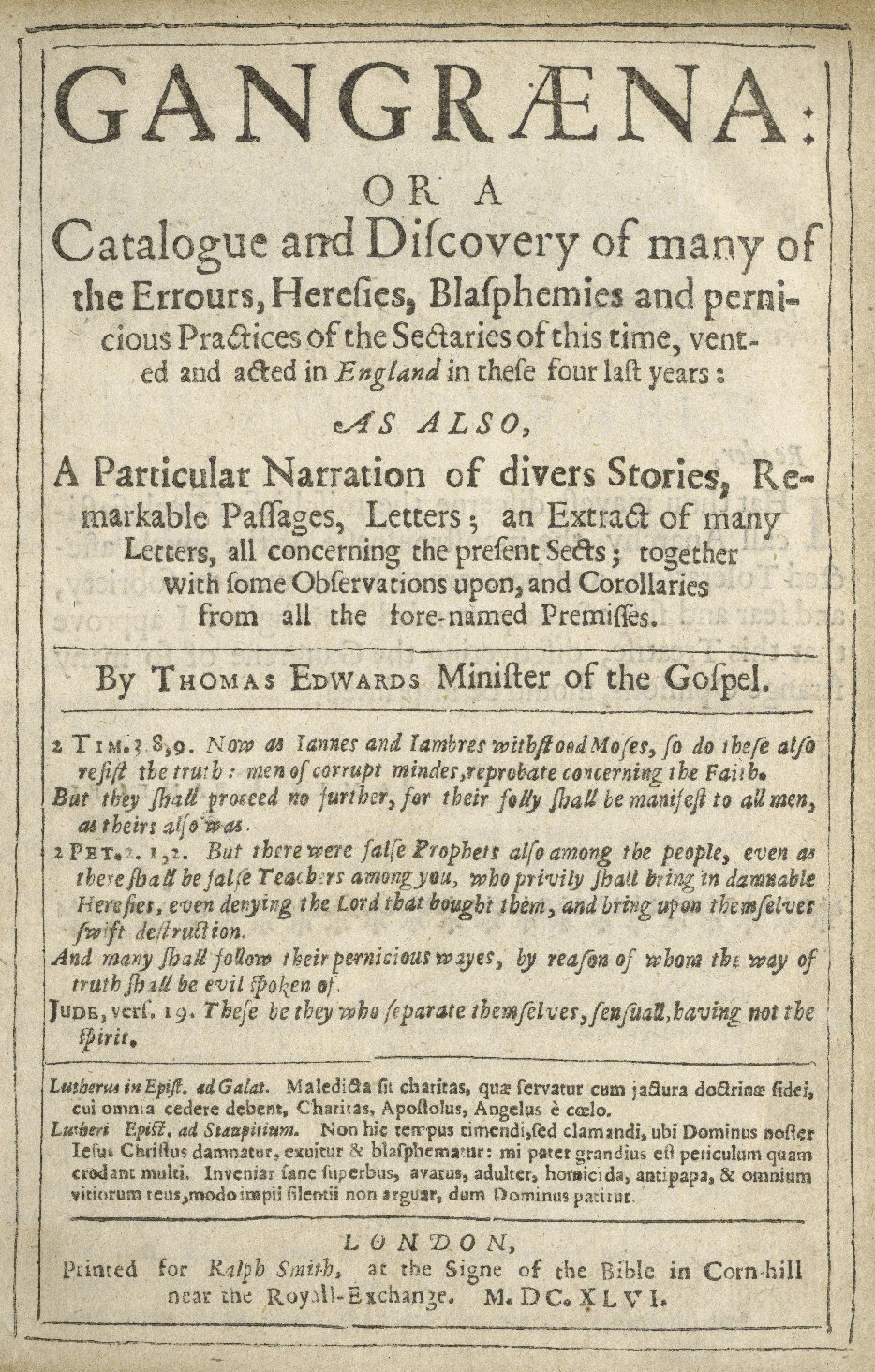
Gangræna, 1st edition

Gangraena is a book by English puritan clergyman Thomas Edwards, published in 1646. A notorious work of heresiography, it appeared the year after Ephraim Pagitt's Heresiography. These two books attempted to catalogue the fissiparous Protestant congregations of the time, in England particularly, into recognised sects or beliefs. Pagitt worked with 40 to 50 categories, Edwards went further with around three times as many, compiling a list of the practices of the Independents and more extreme radicals:

Thomas Edwards, in his Gangraena (1645), enumerated, with uncritical exaggeration, no less than sixteen sects and one hundred and seventy-six miscellaneous "errors, heresies and blasphemies," exclusive of popery and deism.

== Nature of Gangraena ==
Gangraena is generally described as an alarmist work, deducing a collapse of national polity from the ramification of different religious creeds. Typically, the Baptist Hanserd Knollys was accused of being an Anabaptist. Heresy is foregrounded, and the analogy suggested that heresy is to the soul as witchcraft to the body. Edwards was an unsparing writer and Gangraena is described as "monumentally vituperative". The title itself refers to 2 Timothy 2:17, and "canker" in the King James version.

It is not really a unified work, called a "complex, ramshackle text" by Nicholas Tyacke. It appeared in three volumes, with information added from correspondents, and Richard Baxter in particular was also a contributor. Scholarly opinions on it are now mixed, having in the past been somewhat dismissive of the work as paranoid and probably counter-productive in the way of providing and circulating a menu of "heretical" options. Some scholars now see it as made more coherent by its inferences from and to the diabolical element, and more readable casually for the audience of the times, than it has in the past been allowed credit.

== Influence ==
In the work, as the first ideological identification of Levellers, Edwards summed up Levellers' views and attacked their radical political egalitarianism that showed no respect for the constitution. The prime targets in part III of his work were the men who were to be recognized as the leaders of the Leveller party.

== Reception ==
Gangraena provoked over 30 pamphlet responses in the period 1646–7, mostly hostile. Among them were works by Jeremiah Burroughes, John Goodwin, John Lilburne, John Saltmarsh and William Walwyn.
