= John Wilkinson (Hebraist) =

English churchman and academic

John Wilkinson (1588–1650) was an English churchman and academic; principal of Magdalen Hall, Oxford, but expelled in 1643; one of the parliamentary visitors of Oxford; and president of Magdalen College, Oxford, from 1648 to 1650.

== Life ==
He was born in Yorkshire, and matriculated at Merton College in October 1588. He graduated with a B.A. on 3 February 1592, an M.A. on 30 June 1595, a B.D. on 4 July 1605 and a D.D. in December 1613. He was praelector in Hebrew from 1596 to 1620, and tutor to Henry Frederick, Prince of Wales. He was formally principal of Magdalen Hall from 1605. He stood for election as president of Magdalen College in 1607, when William Langton was elected. He was appointed a visitor by Parliament in May 1647, and took part in the expulsion of fellows of Magdalen who would not submit. He was elected president on 12 April 1648.

Academic offices
Preceded by John Oliver	President of Magdalen College, Oxford; 1648–1650	Succeeded by Thomas Goodwin
