= John Leland =

John Leland may refer to:

- John Leland (antiquary) (c. 1503–1552), English antiquary
- John Leland (Baptist) (1754–1841), United States Baptist minister
- John Leland (journalist) (born 1959), New York Times reporter, columnist, and book author
- John Leland (British Army officer) (died 1808), British Army general and English member of parliament for Stamford, 1796–1808
- John Leland (Presbyterian) (1691–1766), English Presbyterian minister
- John E. Leland, American engineer and director of the University of Dayton Research Institute

== See also ==
- John Leland Atwood (1904–1999), American aerospace engineer
- John Leland Center for Theological Studies in Virginia, United States
- John Leland Champe (1895–1978), American archaeologist
