= John Oliver (Dean of Worcester) =

English royalist churchman

John Oliver (1601–1661) was an English royalist churchman, President of Magdalen College, Oxford, and Dean of Worcester.

== Life ==
He was born in Kent, and matriculated from Merton College, Oxford, on 26 January 1616. He became a demy of Magdalen College on 7 April 1619, graduated B.A. on 11 December 1619, and became fellow in 1620. He also proceeded M.A. on 3 July 1622, B.D. on 18 May 1631, D.D. on 29 April 1639. He was tutor to Edward Hyde, when he was at Oxford, became vice-president of his college in 1634, held several livings and was made canon of Winchester in 1638, chaplain to William Laud in 1640. Laud left him one of his watches by his will.

In 1643 he took refuge after the unsuccessful royalist rising near Tonbridge with Dr. Buckner, who had been a tutor at Magdalen. There he found Henry Hammond, who had a price on his head, and was escaping in disguise. They made together for Winchester, then still in royalist hands. A messenger found them there, with the news that Oliver had been nominated President of Magdalen College; they both travelled to Oxford, and Oliver took up the post in 1644.

He was ejected from Magdalen in 1647 by the parliamentary visitation, but was restored to his preferments at the Restoration. By the influence of Hyde, he was made dean of Worcester on 13 September 1660. He died 27 October 1661, and was buried in Magdalen College antechapel.

== Notes ==
Academic offices
Preceded by Accepted Frewen	President of Magdalen College, Oxford; 1644–1647	Succeeded by John Wilkinson
Preceded by Thomas Goodwin	President of Magdalen College, Oxford; 1660–1661	Succeeded by Thomas Pierce
