= John E. Leland =

John E. Leland is vice president for Research and Executive Director of the University of Dayton Research Institute. He previously served as the institute's director of operations and a division head and as the University of Dayton's director for technology partnerships. Before working at the University of Dayton, Leland worked for the United States Air Force. During the 2002–2003 term, Leland was named a Fellow of the American Society of Mechanical Engineers.

Leland received a Ph.D. in mechanical engineering from the University of Kentucky in 1994.
