= William Bridge =

English Independent minister, preacher and writer

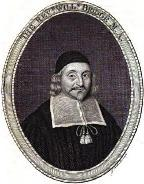
William Bridge.

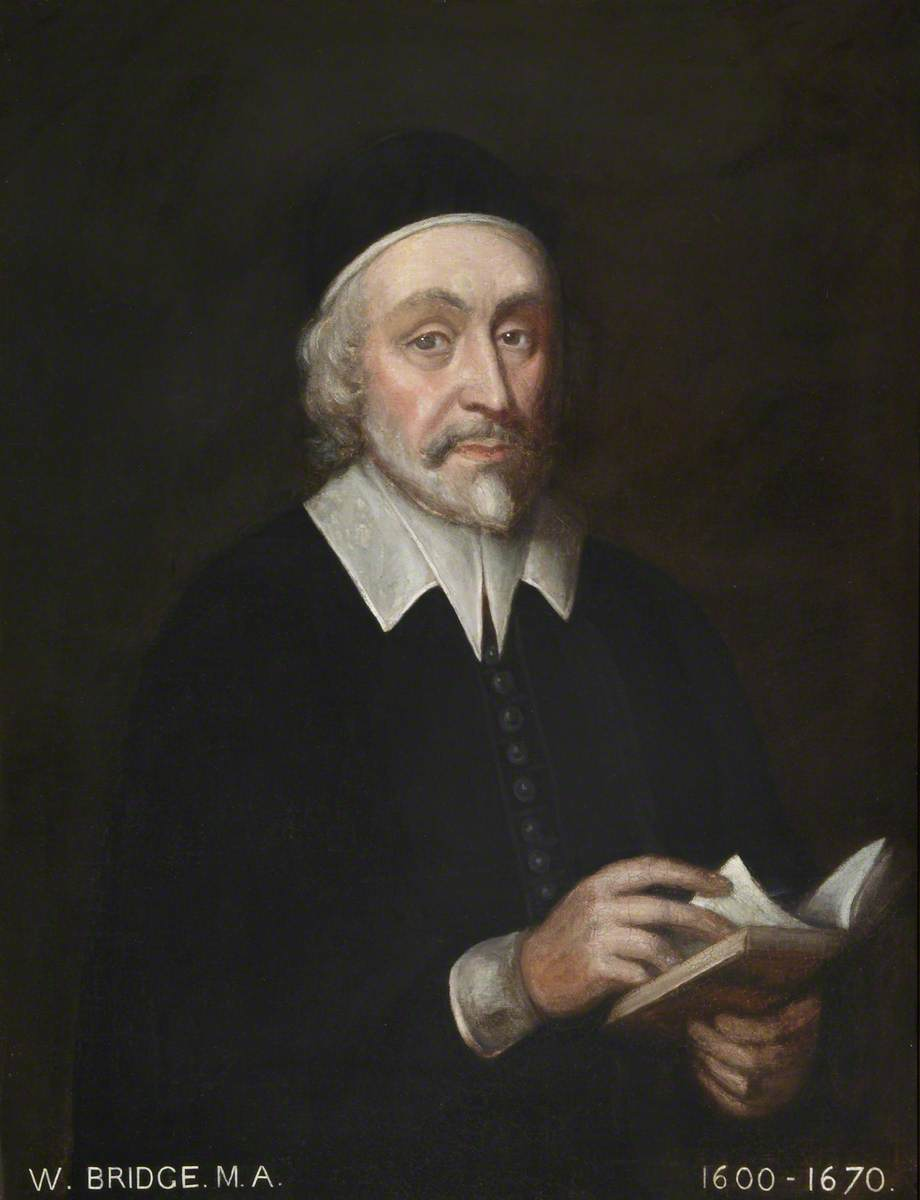

William Bridge (c. 1600 – 1670) was a leading English Independent minister, preacher, and religious and political writer.

== Life ==
A native of Cambridgeshire, the Rev. William Bridge was probably born in or around the year 1600. He studied at Emmanuel College, Cambridge, receiving an M.A. in 1626.

For a short time in 1631, he was a lecturer (preacher) at Colchester, put in place by Harbottle Grimstone and Robert Rich, 2nd Earl of Warwick; this was very much against the wishes of William Laud, then Bishop of London, who complained of the influence then held by Richard Sibbes and William Gouge, clerical leaders of the Feoffees for Impropriations. From 1637, he lived in Norwich as Rector of St Peter Hungate, Norwich and St George's Church, Tombland, Norwich. He came into conflict with Matthew Wren, bishop of Norwich, for Nonconformity. He went into exile in Rotterdam, taking the position left vacant by Hugh Peters. Charles I of England upon hearing from Archbishop Laud that Rev. Bridge had "gone to Holland", "...rather than [that] he will conform" replied, "Let him go: we are well rid of him."

He returned to Great Yarmouth and became a member of the Westminster Assembly. There he was one of the Five Dissenting Brethren, the small group of leading churchmen who emerged at the head of the Independent faction, opposing the Presbyterian majority, and who composed An Apollegeticall Narration in 1643.

In 1643, he preached in front of Charles I of England, making a direct attack on the Queen.

He was Minister at the Old Meeting House Norwich for several years right up until his death.

== Works ==
- A Lifting Up for the Downcast, reprinted by the Banner of Truth Trust

His main point here is that faith is the help against all discouragements, and that Christ's blood is the object of faith, and faith brings peace. When believers are discouraged, they are to exercise their faith in Christ's blood and righteousness.

- The Wounded Conscience Cured, the Weak One Strengthened and the Doubting Satisfied by Way of Answer to Doctor Ferne (1642)
- Ioabs covnsell and King Davids seasonable hearing it (1643), Fast Sermon for February 22
- The truth of the times vindicated (1643)
- The righteous man's habitation in the time of plague and pestilence : being a brief exposition of the XCI. Psalm (1835)
  - https://archive.org/details/righteousmanshab00brid OL 19369755M
- The refuge : containing the righteous man's habitation in the time of plague and pestilence : being a brief exposition of the 91st Psalm (1832)
  - https://archive.org/details/refugecontaining00brid OL 19369761M
- The works of the Rev. William Bridge (Volume 1)
  - https://archive.org/details/worksofrevwillia01bridiala OL 7027234M
  - https://archive.org/details/theworksofrevbri00briduoft
- The works of the Rev. William Bridge (Volume 2)
  - https://archive.org/details/worksofrevwillia02bridiala OL 7027234M
  - https://archive.org/details/theworksoftherev02briduoft
- The works of the Rev. William Bridge (Volume 3)
  - https://archive.org/details/worksofrevwillia03bridiala OL 7027234M
  - https://archive.org/details/theworksoftherev03briduoft
- The works of the Rev. William Bridge (Volume 4)
  - https://archive.org/details/worksofrevwillia04bridiala OL 7027234M
  - https://archive.org/details/bridgesworks04briduoft
- The works of the Rev. William Bridge (Volume 5)
  - https://archive.org/details/worksofrevwillia05bridiala OL 7027234M
  - https://archive.org/details/bridgesworks05briduoft

A large collected Works of the Rev. William Bridge was published in 1845, and reprinted in 1989 in five hardback volumes by Soli Deo Gloria Publications.
