= Philip Nye =

English Independent theologian (c. 1595–1672)

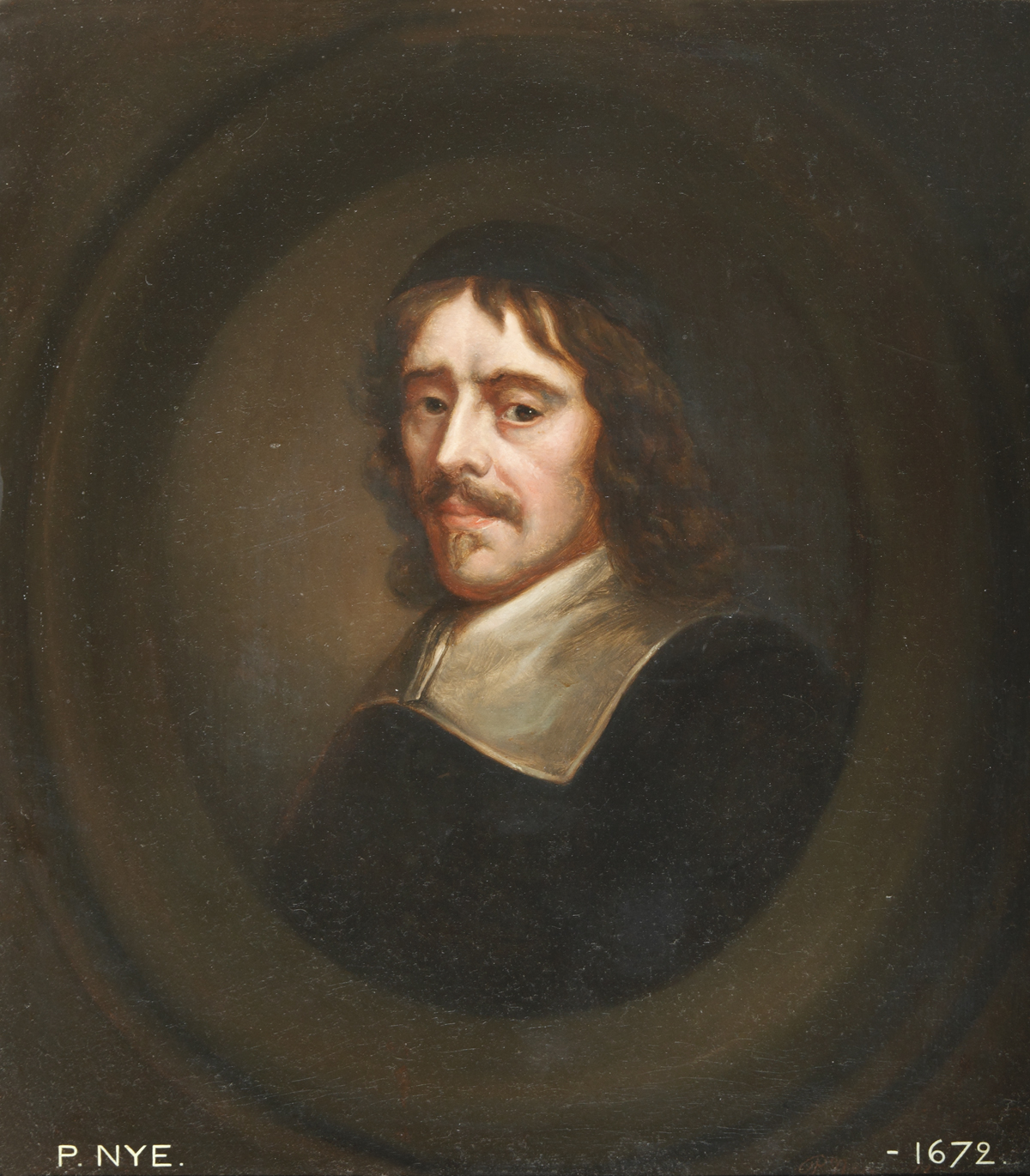
Philip Nye

Philip Nye (c. 1595–1672) was a leading English Independent theologian and a member of the Westminster Assembly of Divines. He was the key adviser to Oliver Cromwell on matters of religion and regulation of the Church.

== Life ==
Philip Nye was born into a middle-class family in Sussex, in about 1595. He entered Brasenose College, Oxford as a commoner on July 21, 1615. Afterwards he went to Magdalen Hall, Oxford where he studied under a Puritan tutor. He graduated from Magdalen Hall with an Arts degree in 1619 and an M.A. in 1622. He then entered holy orders and became curate of St Michael's Church, Cornhill, near London. He fell foul of the episcopal court and fled to Holland, spending the years 1633–1640 in exile.

He later held the parish of Acton, and was sent by Parliament on a mission to the imprisoned King Charles I.

He was one of the Five Dissenting Brethren in the Westminster Assembly, and a leader of the group alongside Thomas Goodwin. With support from Lord Kimbolton he had influential connections with the Parliamentary Army, and also had the living of Kimbolton, then in Huntingdonshire. According to Ivan Roots, the eventual ecclesiastical settlement under the Protectorate followed closely proposals from 1652, outlined by Nye with John Owen and others.

Nye co-wrote and promoted the Solemn League and Covenant. Nye along with Stephen Marshall "were sent with the commissioners who went from the English Parliament into Scotland, in order to obtain and establish an agreement with the Scottish nation, and to desire their assistance."

He was a member of the parliamentary subcommittee that created the 1644 Directory for Public Worship and largely wrote it himself.

In 1647, he was one of the preachers who went from the Parliament to Charles I on the Isle of Wight, in order to save his soul and build a political settlement.

Samuel Butler wrote a poem about him, "Upon Philip Nye's Thanksgiving Beard", and mentioned him in Hudibras.

When the monarchy was restored in 1660, Nye was initially excluded from the general pardon. That should have meant being hung, drawn and quartered. However, he was included afterwards in the Bill of Indemnity on the condition that he did not accept any ecclesiastical, civil, military or public office. Instead he worked for an independent church as a doctor of theology, until his death in 1672.

== On toleration ==
Nye and Goodwin co-authored An Apologeticall Narration, pleading for toleration of Calvinist congregations outside a proposed Presbyterian national church. Their text presented to Parliament on 3 January 1644 argued that Congregational churches were closer to the practice of early Christians and more suited to the changeability of the times. It meant they could avoid having their views debated at the Westminster Assembly, where they would have been outnumbered and perhaps outvoted. In the Whitehall Debates of 1648, however, Nye backed Henry Ireton's view that toleration should be limited by the state and joined in opposing the Racovian Catechism.

== Views ==
Nye was famous for supporting religious freedom and independence. He opposed "a presbytery with a civil state", but otherwise liked Presbyterianism for its staunch scriptural views.

Nye along with Thomas Goodwin pleaded forcefully for allowing Jews to return to England. Their plea had Cromwell's direct encouragement, although wild antisemitic rumours and general public antipathy made readmission politically impossible.

He was strong an opponent of astrology, Christmas and superstition in general.

== Publications ==
- Philip Nye (1643), Two speeches delivered before the subscribing of the Covenant, the 25. of September, at St. Margarets in Westminster, Edinburgh: Printed by Robert Bryson, OL 16714330M
- Philip Nye (1643), An exhortation to the taking of the Solemne League and Covenant for reformation and defence of religion, the honour and happinesse of the King, and the peace and safety of the three kingdomes of England, Scotland, and Ireland, London: s.n., OL 15044211M
- Philip Nye (1644), An exhortation to the taking of the Solemne league and covenant for reformation and defence of religion, the hononr [sic] and happinesse of the king, and the peace and safety of the three kingdomes of England, Scotland, and Ireland, Printed at London: For Ralph Smith ..., OL 15040272M
- Philip Nye (1646), The Excellency and Lawfulnesse of the Solemne League and Covenant, London: Printed by W. Wilson, OL 19935206M
- Philip Nye (1658), A declaration of the faith and order owned and practised in the Congregational Churches of England; agreed upon and consented unto by their elders and messengers in their meeting at the Savoy, October 12. 1658, London: Printed by John Field, OL 13914168M
- Philip Nye (1660), Beames of former light, discovering how evil it is to impose doubtfull and disputable formes or practises, upon ministers, London: Printed by R.I. for A. Byfield, OL 18960457M
- Philip Nye (1662), The lawfulnes of the oath of supremacy and power of the civil magistrate in ecclesiastical affairs: and subordination of churches thereunto, London: printed by Peter Cole at the Printing-press in Cornhil neer the Royal Exchange, OL 15428961M
- Philip Nye (1677), A case of great and present use, London: [s.n.], OL 3665216M
- Philip Nye (1683), The lawfulnes of hearing the publick ministers of the Church of England proved, London: Printed for Jonathan Robinson ..., OL 3664844M
- Philip Nye (1683), The lawfulnes of the oath of supremacy, and power of the King in ecclesiastical affairs, London: Printed for Jonathan Robinson ..., and Samuel Crowch ..., OL 15040344M
- Philip Nye (1687), The King's authority in dispensing with ecclesiastical laws asserted and vindicated, London: Printed for H.N. and Nathanael Ranew ..., OL 1678319M
