= Westminster Assembly =

1643–1653 English church reform council

Coordinates: 51.4994°N 0.1286°W

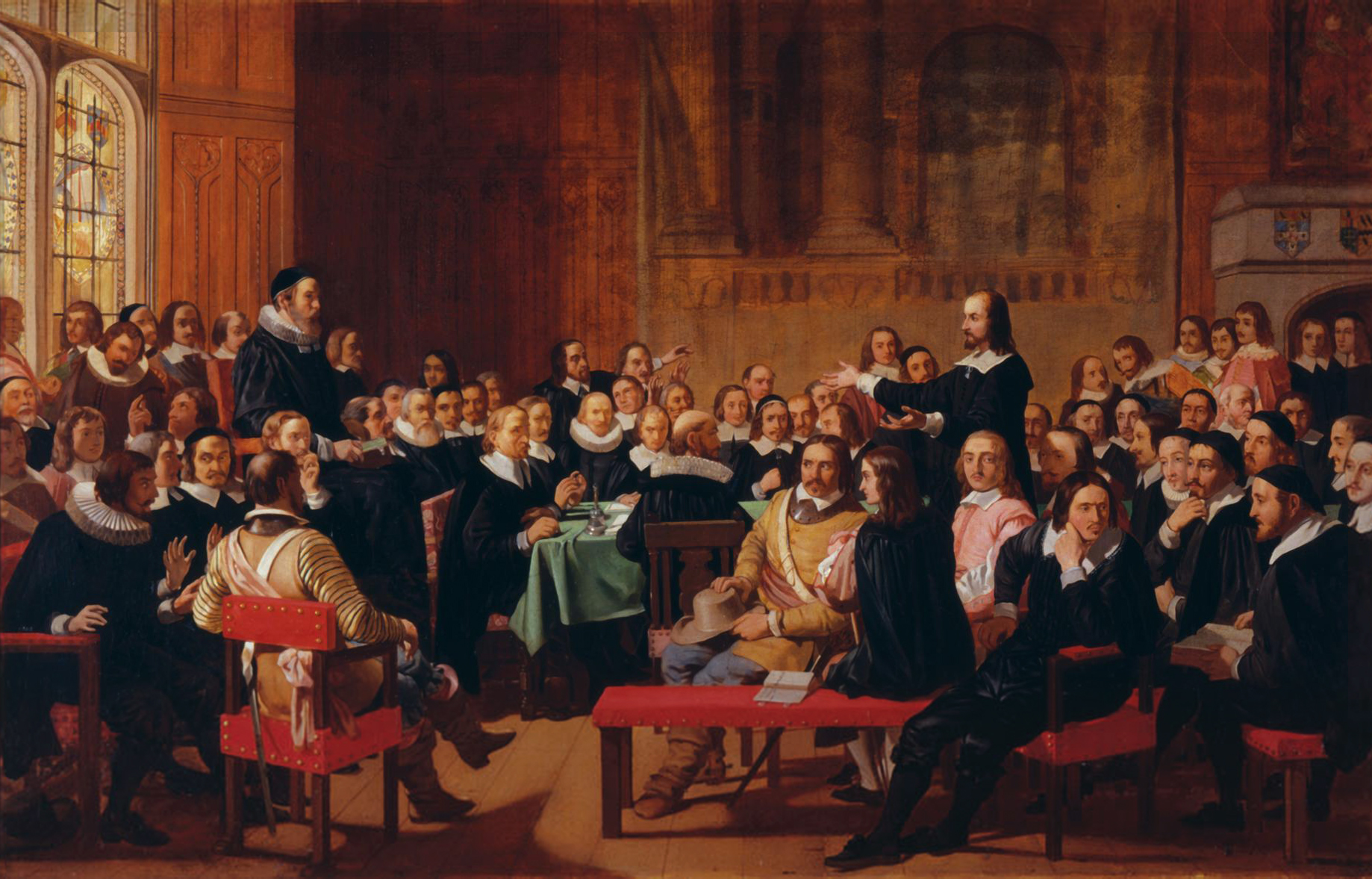
This painting by John Rogers Herbert depicts a particularly controversial speech before the Assembly by Philip Nye against presbyterian church government.

The Westminster Assembly of Divines was a council of divines (theologians) and members of the English Parliament appointed from 1643 to 1653 to restructure the Church of England. Several Scots also attended, and the Assembly's work was adopted by the Church of Scotland. As many as 121 ministers were called to the Assembly, with nineteen others added later to replace those who did not attend or could no longer attend. It produced a new Form of Church Government, a Confession of Faith or statement of belief, two catechisms or manuals for religious instruction (Shorter and Larger), and a liturgical manual, the Directory for Public Worship, for the Churches of England and Scotland. The Confession and catechisms were adopted as doctrinal standards in the Church of Scotland and other Presbyterian churches, where they remain normative. Amended versions of the Confession were also adopted in Congregational and Baptist churches in England and New England in the seventeenth and eighteenth centuries. The Confession became influential throughout the English-speaking world, but especially in American Protestant theology.

The Assembly was called by the Long Parliament before and during the beginning of the First English Civil War. The Long Parliament was influenced by Puritanism, a religious movement which sought further reform of the church. They were opposed to the religious policies of King Charles I and William Laud, Archbishop of Canterbury. As part of a military alliance with Scotland, Parliament agreed that the outcome of the Assembly would bring the English Church into closer conformity with the Church of Scotland. The Scottish Church was governed by a system of elected assemblies of elders called presbyterianism, rather than rule by bishops, called episcopalianism, which was used in the English church. Scottish commissioners attended and advised the Assembly as part of the agreement. Disagreements over church government caused open division in the Assembly, despite attempts to maintain unity. The party of divines who favoured presbyterianism was in the majority, but the congregationalist party, which held greater influence in the military, favoured autonomy for individual congregations rather than the subjection of congregations to regional and national assemblies entailed in presbyterianism. Parliament eventually adopted a presbyterian form of government but lacked the power to implement it. During the Restoration of the monarchy in 1660, all of the documents of the Assembly were repudiated and episcopal church government was reinstated in England.

The Assembly worked in the Reformed Protestant theological tradition, also known as Calvinism. It took the Bible as the authoritative word of God, from which all theological reflection must be based. The divines were committed to the Reformed doctrine of predestination—that God chooses certain men to be saved and enjoy eternal life rather than eternal punishment. There was some disagreement at the Assembly over the doctrine of particular redemption—that Christ died only for those chosen for salvation. The Assembly also held to Reformed covenant theology, a framework for interpreting the Bible. The Assembly's Confession is the first of the Reformed confessions to teach a doctrine called the covenant of works, which teaches that before the fall of man, God promised eternal life to Adam on condition that he perfectly obeyed God.

== Background ==
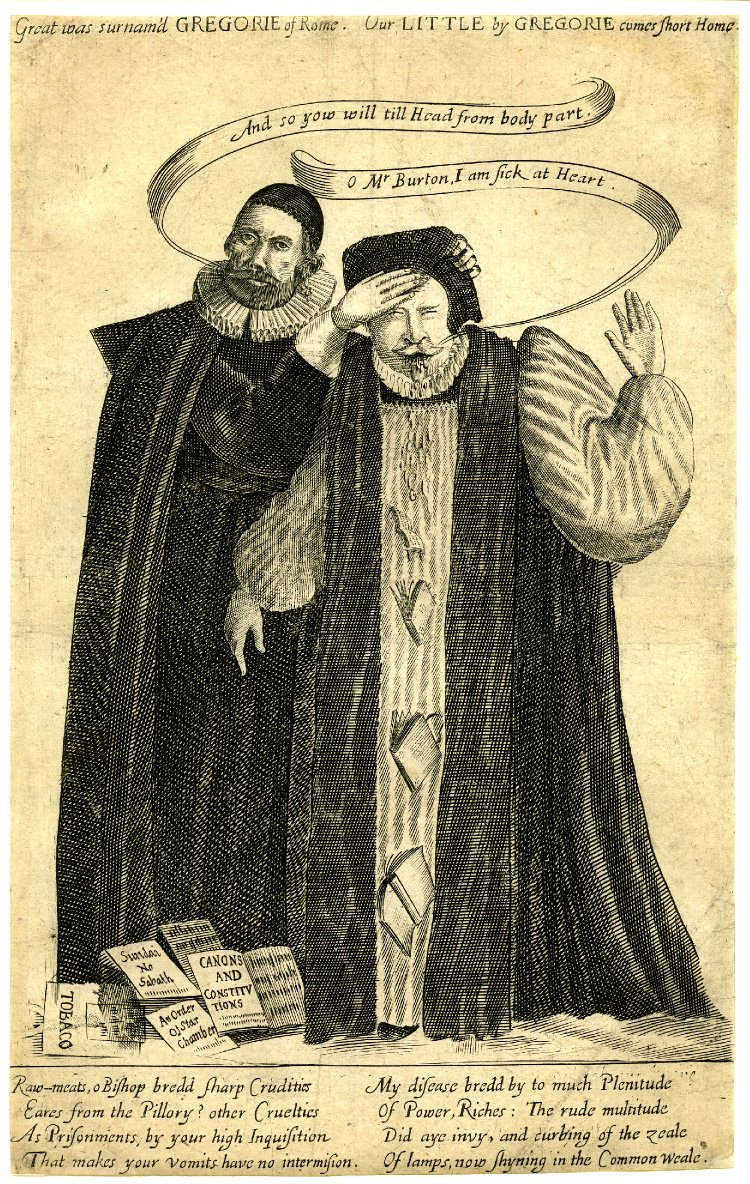
This 1645 satirical print depicts Archbishop William Laud and Puritan Henry Burton. Burton's ears have been cut off as punishment for criticizing Laud. Their dialogue references Laud's impending beheading following his trial by Parliament.

The Parliament called the Westminster Assembly during a time of increasing hostility between Charles I, monarch of England and Scotland, and the Puritans. Puritans could be distinguished by their insistence that worship practices be supported implicitly or explicitly by the Bible, while their opponents gave greater authority to traditional customs. They believed the Church of England, which had separated itself from the Roman communion during the English Reformation, was still too heavily influenced by medieval Catholicism. They sought to rid the church and nation of any of these remaining influences. This included the Church's episcopal polity, or rule by a hierarchy of bishops. Non-separating Puritans, unlike Separatist Puritans, did not leave the established church. Under Charles, the Puritans' opponents were placed in high positions of authority, most notably William Laud who was made Archbishop of Canterbury in 1633, even though these "high churchmen" were in the minority. Puritans were forced to keep their views private or face fines and imprisonment. Laud promoted advocates of Arminianism, a theological perspective opposed to the Reformed theology of the Puritans. Worship practices such as kneeling at communion, bowing at the name of Christ, and the placement of communion tables at the East end of churches were also reinstated. To the Puritans, these seemed to be a step in the direction of Catholicism.

There were also conflicts between the king and the Scots, whose church was ruled by a system known as presbyterianism, which features elected assemblies. James, Charles's predecessor as King of Scotland, made it clear that he intended to impose elements of episcopal church government and the Book of Common Prayer on the Scots beginning in 1604. The Scots considered this a reversion to Roman Catholicism. Charles furthered English impositions on the Church of Scotland in 1636 and 1637. This led to the First Bishops' War between Charles and the Scots in 1639. Charles called what came to be known as the Short Parliament to raise funds for the war, but he soon dissolved it when it began voicing opposition to his policies. Following the Second Bishops' War with the Scots in 1640, Charles was forced to call another parliament to raise additional funds.

What came to be known as the Long Parliament also began to voice vague grievances against Charles, many of which were religious in nature. Parliament had many Puritans and Puritan-sympathizing members, who generally opposed the existing episcopal system, but there was little agreement over what shape the church should take. Later in 1640, the Root and Branch petition was presented to the House of Commons, the lower house of Parliament. It was signed by about 15,000 Londoners and called for total elimination of the episcopal system. Committees were organized in the House of Commons to enact religious reforms, leading to the imprisonment of Archbishop Laud and his supporters in the Tower of London as retaliation for their repression of Puritans. The Court of High Commission and the Star Chamber, courts which had inflicted severe punishments on Nonconformist Puritans, were also abolished.

== Calling the assembly ==
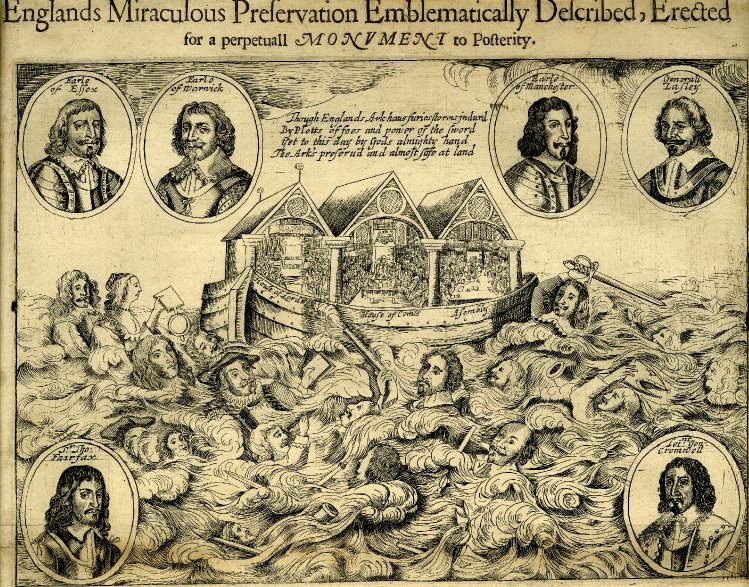
This 1646 allegorical broadside shows the two houses of Parliament and the Westminster Assembly on an ark on a sea in which royalists drown. An accompanying poem calls the three the "Trinity of State".

The idea of a national assembly of theologians to advise Parliament on further church reforms was first presented to the House of Commons in 1641. Such a proposal was also included in the Grand Remonstrance, a list of grievances which Parliament presented to Charles on 1 December that year. Charles responded on 23 December that the church required no reforms. Undeterred, Parliament passed three bills in 1642 appointing an assembly and stipulating that its members would be chosen by Parliament. Charles, whose royal assent was required for the bills to become law, was only willing to consider such an assembly if the members were chosen by the clergy. This was the practice for selection of members of Convocation, the assembly of clergy of the Church of England.

Defying the king, between 12 February and 20 April 1642, each county delegation of England in the Commons chose two divines, in addition to two for each county of Wales, four for London, and two for each University (Oxford and Cambridge). County delegations often chose divines from their own county, but not always. Commons chose the members in this way to ensure that their local constituencies were represented in the decision. The House of Lords, Parliament's upper house, added another fourteen names on 14 May, to which the Commons agreed. Meanwhile, relations continued to deteriorate between the king and Parliament. Charles raised the royal standard at Nottingham on 22 August, marking the beginning of the First English Civil War. The start of the war lent support to the cause of the Assembly in Parliament, because holding it would convince the Scots that Parliament was serious about reforming the church and induce the Scots to come to their aid. On the other hand, the war added strain to the already busy Parliament.

Parliament finally passed an ordinance to hold the assembly on its own authority without Charles's assent on 12 June 1643. It named as many as 121 ministers (Note: The version of the ordinance in the Journal of the House of Lords (probably least reliable) has 119 ministers, the engrossed ordinance has 121, and early printed copies have 120. Josias Shute was included in early copies until the Lords realized he was recently deceased and replaced him with Simeon Ashe.) and thirty non-voting parliamentary observers: twenty from the Commons, and ten from the House of Lords. The Assembly was almost entirely English; Parliament appointed Englishmen for the counties of Wales, but the French stranger churches (churches of Protestant refugees from Catholic France) sent two ministers in place of any from the Channel Islands. Many of the divines were internationally recognized scholars of the Bible, ancient languages, patristics, and scholastic theology. Many were also famous preachers. Most of these theologians had retained their positions in the Church during the tenure of William Laud. Some had been ejected from their churches or cited by ecclesiastical courts for their views. Some had fled to the Continent, and one to the American colonies. Nonetheless, they all considered themselves members of the Church of England and had received episcopal ordination. Most were conformists, meaning they agreed to follow the Act of Uniformity 1558 and the Book of Common Prayer.

The Assembly was strictly under the control of Parliament, and was only to debate topics which Parliament directed. Assembly members were not permitted to state their disagreements with majority opinions or share any information about the proceedings, except in writing to Parliament. Parliament chose William Twisse, an internationally respected theologian, to be the Assembly's prolocutor (Note: Parliament chose this term because it was that of the leader of Convocation, the assembly of English bishops, rather than "moderator", the term used by the Scots for the leader of their General Assembly.) or chairman. Due to Twisse's ill health, Cornelius Burges, whom Parliament appointed as one of several assessors, served as prolocutor pro tempore for most of the Assembly. Twenty-two appointed members of the Assembly died before 1649, and they along with those who did not attend for other reasons were replaced by another nineteen members. Three non-voting scribes were also added in 1643.

== Revising the Thirty-Nine Articles ==
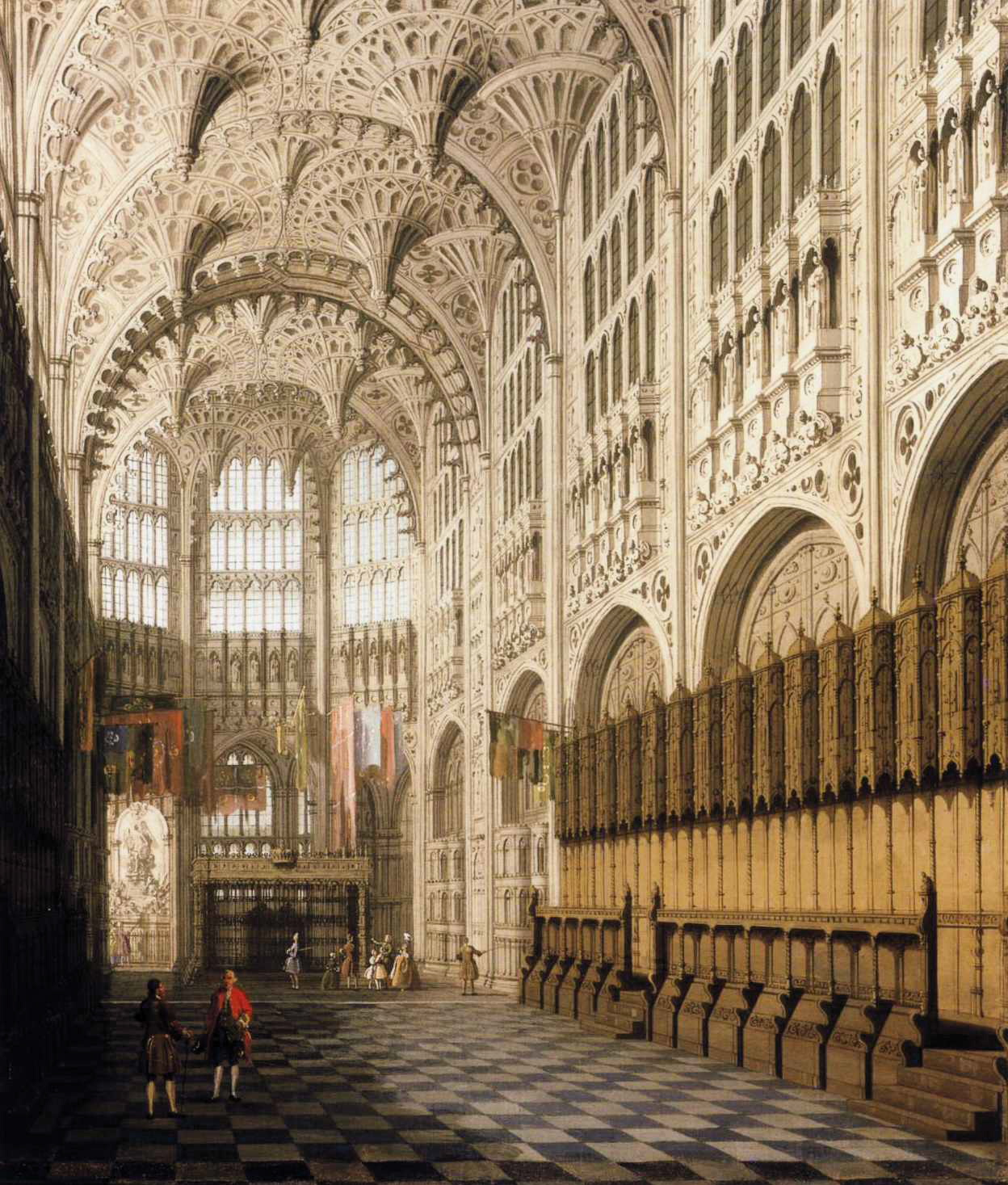
The Henry VII Chapel in Westminster Abbey, the Assembly's first meeting place, in a painting by Canaletto

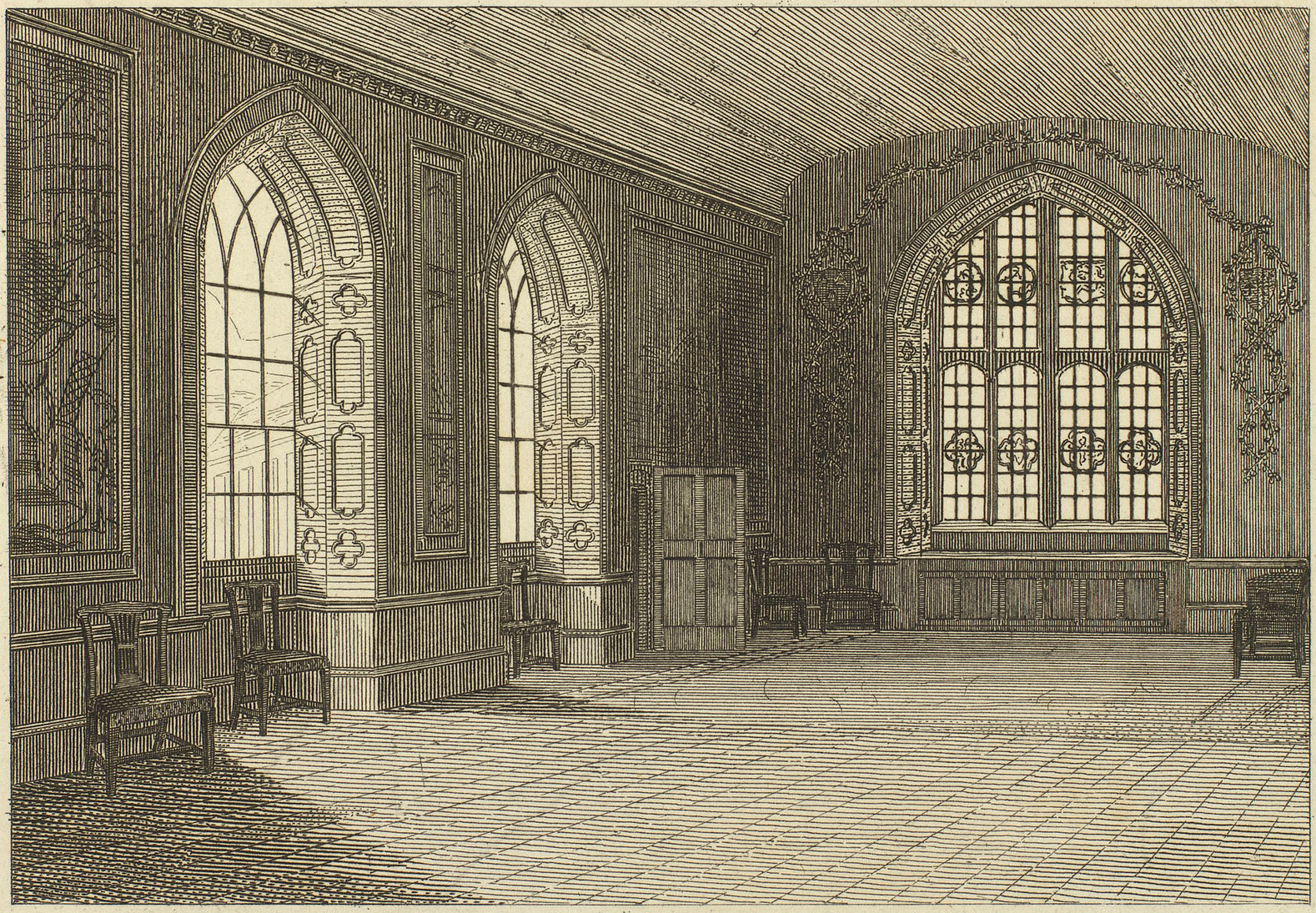
The Assembly moved to the Jerusalem Chamber adjoining Westminster Abbey in October 1643.

The Assembly's first meeting began with a sermon by William Twisse in the nave of Westminster Abbey on 1 July 1643. The nave was so full that the House of Commons had to send members ahead to secure seats. Following the sermon, the divines processed to the Henry VII Chapel, which would be their place of meeting until 2 October when they moved to the warmer and more private Jerusalem Chamber. After their initial meeting they adjourned for about a week, as Parliament had not yet given specific instructions.

On 6 July, they received a set of rules from Parliament and were ordered to examine the first ten of the Thirty-Nine Articles, the current doctrinal standard of the Church of England, and "to free and vindicate the Doctrine of them from all Aspersions of false Interpretations". After a day of fasting, the Assembly took a vow, as directed by Parliament, to "not maintain any thing in Matters of Doctrine, but what I think, in my conscience, to be truth". The divines organized themselves into three standing committees, though each committee was open to any member of the Assembly. The committees would be assigned topics and prepare propositions for debate in the full Assembly following each morning of committee meetings. In addition, over 200 ad hoc committees were appointed for tasks such as examination of candidate preachers, college fellows, and suspected heretics.

The Assembly resolved, after some debate, that all the doctrines of the Thirty-Nine articles would need to be proven from the Bible. Assembly members were prone to long speeches and they made slow progress, frustrating the leadership. The eighth of the Thirty-Nine Articles recommended the Apostles' Creed, Nicene Creed, and Athanasian Creed, considered to be basic statements of orthodoxy, to be received and believed. The Assembly was unable to resolve conflicts between those who would not be bound by creeds and those who wished to retain the existing language that the creeds be "thoroughly received and believed". The "excepters", who took the former position, argued that the articles only require the "matter" of the creeds be believed. On 25 August the article was put off until the rest of the articles could be dealt with. This early disagreement on fundamental issues revealed deep rifts between different factions of the assembly.

== Debating church government ==
From the beginning of the First Civil War, the Long Parliament recognized that they would need assistance from the Scots. In return for a military alliance, the Scottish Parliament required the English to sign the Solemn League and Covenant in 1643, which stipulated that the English would bring their church into greater conformity with the Church of Scotland. The Scottish Parliament sent commissioners to London to represent Scotland's interests to the English Parliament. Eleven of these, four theologians and seven members of Parliament, were also invited to the Assembly. The commissioners were given the opportunity to become full voting members of the Assembly but declined, preferring to maintain their independence as commissioners of their own nation and church. Samuel Rutherford, George Gillespie, and Alexander Henderson were the most outspoken of the commissioners.

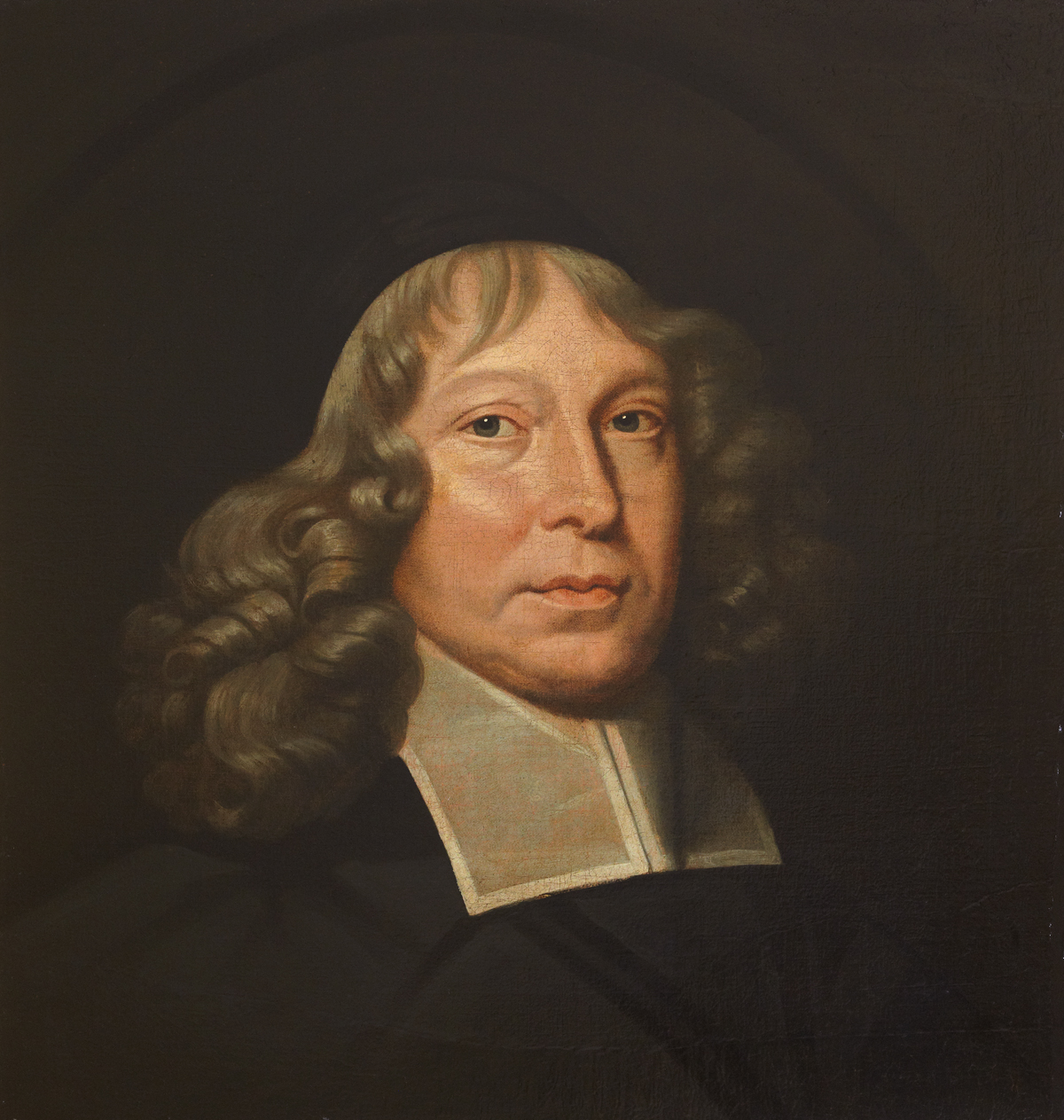
Samuel Rutherford was one of the most prominent of the Scottish commissioners.

On 12 October 1643, Parliament ordered the Assembly to cease work on the Thirty-Nine Articles and to begin to frame a common form of church government for the two nations. The Assembly would spend a quarter of its full sessions on the subject of church government. The majority of the Assembly members supported presbyterian polity, or church government by elected assemblies of lay and clerical representatives, though many were not dogmatically committed to it. Several members of this group, numbering about twenty and including William Twisse, favoured a "primitive" episcopacy, which would include elements of presbyterianism and a reduced role for bishops.

There were also several congregationalists, who favoured autonomy for individual local churches. Their most influential divines were Thomas Goodwin, Philip Nye, Sidrach Simpson, Jeremiah Burroughs, and William Bridge. They were often called the "dissenting brethren" in the Assembly. They have sometimes been labelled "Independents", but they rejected this term. The Assembly members for the most part reserved the label "Independent" for separatists who left the established church. The congregationalist divines cannot be equated with separatists and Brownists, as they had accepted episcopal ordination and remained in the Church of England. Their influence was assisted by the success of Oliver Cromwell and his New Model Army in the ongoing civil war. Cromwell and many others in the army supported congregationalism.

A third group of divines were known as Erastians, a term for those who believed that the state should have significant power over the church. The entire Assembly was Erastian in the sense that the body had been called by Parliament and was completely under state control. Those labelled "Erastian" at the Assembly believed the civil authority, rather than church officers, should hold the power of church discipline. This included the power to withhold communion from unrepentant sinners. They did not see any particular form of church government as divinely mandated, and because of this the dissenting brethren allied with them when it became clear that a presbyterian establishment would be much less tolerant of congregationalism than Parliament. There were only two divines at the Assembly who held the Erastian view, John Lightfoot and Thomas Coleman, but the presence of members of Parliament, especially John Selden, as well as the fact of parliamentary oversight of the Assembly, gave Erastian views disproportional influence.

Several episcopalians, supporters of the existing system of bishops, were also included in the summoning ordinance, but Parliament may have nominated them to lend greater legitimacy to the Assembly and not have expected them to attend because Charles had not approved of the Assembly. Only one, Daniel Featley, participated, and he only until his arrest for treason in October 1643.

Debate on church officers began on 19 October. The Assembly began with the issue of ordination, as many of the divines were concerned about the rise of various sectarian movements and the lack of any mechanism for ordination of ministers of the established church. While some members did not seem to think ordination necessary for preachers (though they should not administer the sacraments without it), a majority of the divines thought any regular preaching without ordination unacceptable and wished to erect a provisional presbytery for purposes of ordination. There was also debate at this early stage over the nature of the visible church. The congregationalists considered a church to be a single local congregation, while the majority considered the national church to be a unity and were alarmed at the prospect of a disintegrated English church. Despite these debates, up until the end of 1643 there was hope that a common church government could be framed that would be satisfactory to all parties involved.

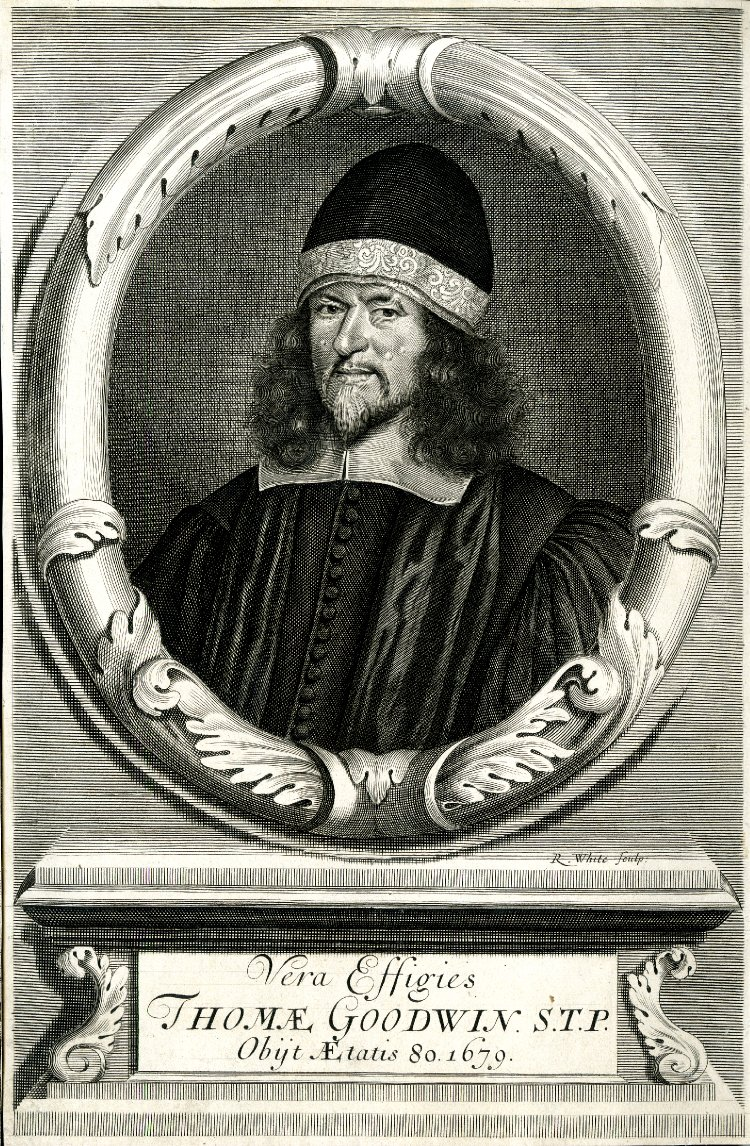
Thomas Goodwin was one of the dissenting brethren.

On 3 or 4 January 1644, the five leading dissenting brethren signalled a break with the rest of the Assembly when they published An Apologeticall Narration, a polemical pamphlet appealing to Parliament. It argued that the congregational system was more amenable to state control of religious matters than that of the presbyterians because they did not desire the church to retain any real power except to withdraw fellowship from aberrant congregations. By 17 January, the majority of the Assembly had become convinced that the best way forward was a presbyterian system similar to that of the Scots, but the dissenting brethren were allowed to continue to state their case in hope that they could eventually be reconciled. It was hoped that by avoiding asserting that presbyterianism was established by divine right, the congregationalists could be accommodated.

Despite these efforts, on 21 February it became clear just how fundamentally opposed the groups were. Philip Nye, one of the dissenting brethren, asserted in a speech that a presbytery set over local congregations would become as powerful as the state and was dangerous to the commonwealth, provoking vigorous opposition from presbyterians. The next day, the Assembly finally began to establish a prescription for presbyterian government. Owing to a strong belief in the unity of the church, the Assembly continued to try to find ways to reconcile the dissenting brethren with the majority throughout 1644, including the establishment of a special committee for that purpose in March. However, on 15 November, the dissenting brethren presented their reasons for disagreement with the rest of the Assembly to Parliament, and on 11 December the majority submitted a draft of a presbyterian form of government.

== Conflicts with Parliament ==
Relations between the Assembly and Parliament were already deteriorating in 1644, when Parliament ignored the Assembly's request that "grossly ignorant and notoriously profane" individuals be barred from communion. While members of Parliament agreed that the sacrament should be kept pure, many of them disagreed with the presbyterian majority in the Assembly over who had the final power of excommunication, taking the Erastian view that it was the state. Also, by 1646, Oliver Cromwell's New Model Army had won the war on behalf of Parliament. Cromwell, along with a majority of the army, was strongly in favour of religious toleration for all sorts of Christians even if the national church was to be presbyterian. His rise to power as a result of his military victories made the idea of a strictly presbyterian settlement without freedom of worship for others very unlikely. Parliament at least wanted to know which sins in particular were grave enough to trigger excommunication by the church; the Assembly was reticent to provide such information, as the majority considered the power of the church in this area to be absolute.

In May 1645, Parliament passed an ordinance allowing excommunicants to appeal the church's sentences to Parliament. Another ordinance on 20 October contained a list of sins to which the church would be limited in its power to excommunicate. To the majority of the divines' dismay, an even more Erastian ordinance was proposed in March 1646. The Assembly published a protest, provoking the Commons to charge it with breach of privilege and to submit nine questions to the divines on the matter. Votes were to be included with the answers, an attempt to force the divines associated with the protest petition to reveal themselves.

The Nine Queries, as they came to be called, focused on the divine right (jure divino) of church government. While the presbyterian divines were capable of defending their vision for church government as established by divine right in the Bible, they were unwilling to answer the queries because doing so would further expose the disunity of the Assembly and weaken their case in Parliament. In July 1647, the New Model Army invaded London and conservative members of Parliament were forced out. Parliament passed an ordinance establishing religious tolerance and ensuring that the Assembly's vision of a national, compulsory presbyterian church would never come to fruition. In London, where support for presbyterianism was greatest, presbyteries were established in only sixty-four of 108 city parishes, and regional presbyterian classes were only formed in fourteen of England's forty counties. A planned national general assembly never met. Many presbyterians did, however, establish voluntary presbyteries in what was a de facto free church situation until the Restoration in 1660, when a compulsory episcopal system was reinstated.

The new Form of Government was much more acceptable to the General Assembly of the Church of Scotland. They passed it on 10 February 1645, contingent on some particularities of presbyterian government which were expected to be worked out in a forthcoming Directory for Church Government. At the same time they announced their desire to formally unite the two churches. Following the rise of Cromwell and the secret Engagement of some Scots with Charles this hope was abandoned, and the documents were never formally adopted. The General Assembly ceased to function under Cromwell and the kings who succeeded him from 1649 to 1690.

== Confession, catechisms, and the Directory for Public Worship ==
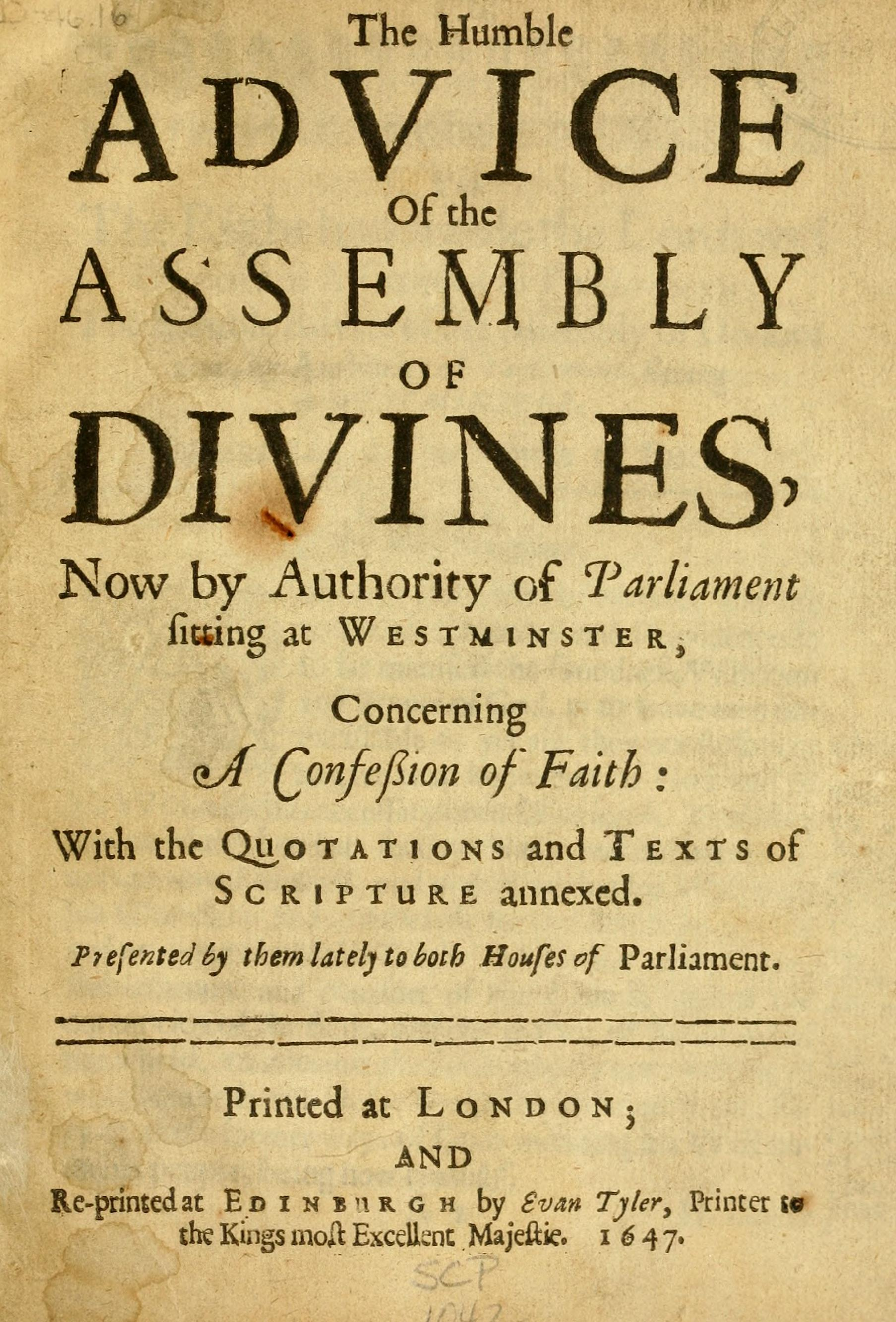
Title page of the first published edition of the Westminster Confession of Faith, printed after the General Assembly of the Church of Scotland approved it in 1647

During and after the debates over church government, the Assembly framed other documents which did not cause open rifts. The Directory for Public Worship, which was to replace the Book of Common Prayer, was swiftly written in 1644 and passed by Parliament on 3 January 1645. The Directory, accepted by the Scots as well, took a middle course between the presbyterians and congregationalists. The presbyterians for the most part preferred a fixed liturgy while congregationalists favoured extemporaneous prayer. The Directory consisted of an order for services with sample prayers. The Assembly also recommended a psalter, translated by Francis Rous for use in worship.

A Confession of Faith to replace the Thirty-Nine Articles was begun in August 1646. While there is little record of the actions of the Assembly during the writing of the Confession, it is clear that there were significant debates in the Assembly over almost every doctrine found in it. The Confession was printed and sent to Parliament in December. The House of Commons requested scripture citations be added to the Confession, which were provided in April 1648. Parliament approved the Confession with revisions to the chapters on church censures, synods and councils, and marriage on 20 June 1648. The General Assembly of the Church of Scotland had already adopted the Confession without revision in 1647. The restoration of Charles II in 1660 effectively made this legislation a nullity.

The Assembly had already done significant work on a catechism between December 1643 and January 1647 containing fifty-five questions, before it decided to create two catechisms rather than one. The Larger Catechism was intended to assist ministers in teaching the Reformed faith to their congregations. The Shorter Catechism was based on the Larger Catechism but intended for use in teaching the faith to children. Parliament demanded scripture proofs for the catechisms as well. The Scots General Assembly approved both catechisms in 1648.

The Assembly understood its mandate under the Solemn League and Covenant to have been fulfilled on 14 April 1648 when it delivered the scripture citations to Parliament, and the Scottish Commissioners had already left by the end of 1647. The Assembly continued to meet primarily for the purpose of examination of ministers for ordination. Most of the divines were unhappy with the republican Commonwealth that emerged after Colonel Pride's Purge of the Long Parliament in 1648. As a result, a majority stopped attending rather than agree to the oath of Engagement to the Commonwealth that was imposed in 1649. Newspapers continued to report on the meetings of the Assembly as late as March 1653. The Assembly must have stopped meeting sometime between then and Cromwell's dissolution of the Rump Parliament on 20 April 1653.

== Theology ==
The Assembly was a product of the British Reformed tradition, taking as a major source the Thirty-Nine Articles as well as the theology of James Ussher and his Irish Articles of 1615. The divines also considered themselves to be within the broader European Reformed tradition. They were in frequent correspondence with continental Reformed theologians, and sought their approval. They also drew upon the pre-Reformation British theological tradition, which emphasized biblical knowledge and was influenced by the Augustinian theological tradition exemplified by Anselm, Thomas Bradwardine, and John Wycliffe. The recorded debates of the Assembly are full of citations of church fathers and medieval scholastic theologians.

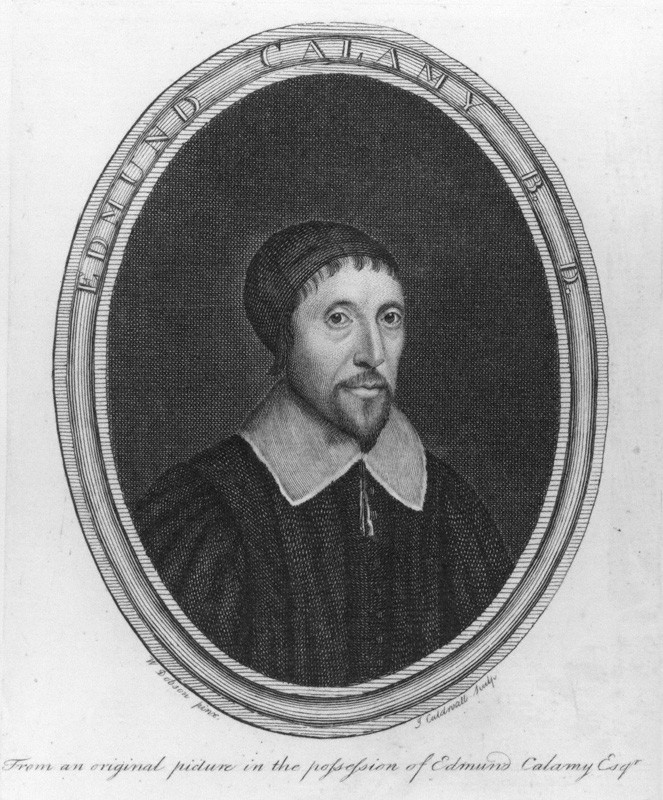
Edmund Calamy argued for hypothetical universalism at the Assembly.

The Confession starts with the doctrine of revelation, or how people can know about God. The divines believed knowledge of God was available to people through nature as well as the Bible, but they also believed that the Bible, or Scripture, is the only way in which people attain saving knowledge of God. The doctrine of Scripture was also a particularly important area of debate at the time. Scholars had begun to argue that the Hebrew vowel points, marks added to the text to aid in pronunciation, of the Old Testament were probably not part of the original. This caused significant debate between Reformed polemicists and Roman Catholics. Catholics argued that such a discovery demonstrated the need for an authoritative magisterium to interpret the Bible as opposed to the Protestant doctrine of perspicuity, that the essential teachings of the Bible could be interpreted by anyone. English Reformed writers in particular took up the work of defending the Reformed doctrine. The divines had a strong view of the inspiration of the Bible, and believed that God revealed himself in the propositions found in Scripture. While the issue of biblical inerrancy, the belief that there are no errors in the Bible, did not arise until the eighteenth century, the divines clearly did not believe the Bible to contain any errors. Many of the divines held a rather mechanical view of biblical inspiration, believing that not only the words and ideas but also the letters and vowel points of the Hebrew text were inspired by God. On the other hand, they acknowledged that the text was written by humans in their own styles. They did not make any distinction between essential and incidental matters with respect to biblical inspiration.

Puritans believed that God is sovereign over all of history and nature and that none of what were called his decrees would be frustrated. There was significant debate in the Assembly over the relationship of God's decree of predestination to the redemption purchased by Christ's death. Many of the Reformed during this period taught that Christ died with the purpose only to save those who were eternally chosen to be saved, a doctrine called particular redemption. A vocal minority of the divines of the Assembly argued for a position known as hypothetical universalism. Edmund Calamy held such a view, and he argued that Christ's death, as well as saving those who had been chosen, offered salvation to all people on condition that they believe. The Assembly's Confession did not teach such a view, and its language is much more amenable to a particular redemption interpretation, but there is a general agreement among scholars that the Confession's language allows an hypothetical universalist interpretation. (Note: Lee Gatiss cites Richard Muller as holding that the Confession intentionally allows for hypothetical universalist views. Jonathan Moore believes the Confession's language can be easily adopted by an hypothetical universalist, and points out that it could have been easily written to be much more clearly exclusive of such a view. J. V. Fesko argues that the Standards lean toward a particularist view, but that they do not exclude non-Amyraldian hypothetical universalist views. Robert Letham believes that the Confession at least intends to exclude hypothetical universalism, though he points out that hypothetical universalist divines were not excluded from the Assembly. A. Craig Troxel writes that the Confession excludes Amyraldism, but does not discuss the other, more moderate forms of hypothetical universalism presented at Westminster.)

Covenant theology is an interpretive framework used by Reformed theologians which was significantly developed during the seventeenth century. Under this scheme, as articulated by the Assembly, God's dealings with men are described in terms of two covenants: the covenant of works and covenant of grace. The Westminster Confession was the first major Reformed symbol to explicitly mention the covenant of works (sometimes called the covenant of life), in which God offered Adam eternal life on condition of perfect obedience. In the fall of man, Adam broke the covenant of works by eating of the tree of knowledge of good and evil. To remedy this, God offered salvation apart from human initiative in what was called the covenant of grace. This covenant allowed man to enjoy eternal life despite his inability to obey God's law perfectly. The idea of the covenant of grace was a much more common feature of orthodox Reformed theology. The Westminster divines set these two covenants against each other as the two major ways in which God deals with people.

The divines associated William Laud and his followers with Catholicism, which they were even more strongly opposed to. Before the civil war, the divines saw these two groups as the greatest threat to the church. With the rise of radical sectarian movements during the war, the divines became much more concerned with these groups than polemics against Catholicism. The divines were particularly concerned with those they labeled antinomians. This was a loose term for those who saw the moral law as no longer relevant for Christians. The divines saw these groups as more immediately threatening than Catholicism.

== Legacy ==
The work of the Westminster Assembly was repudiated by the Church of England during the Restoration in 1660. The Act of Uniformity 1662, a law requiring even greater adherence to the Book of Common Prayer and support for episcopalianism than had previously been required, forced Puritan ministers to leave the Church. Though some presbyterians continued to desire to be readmitted to the established church, restrictions on worship for non-conformists led to presbyterians putting aside differences with congregationalists and adopting congregational church orders.

The Civil War brought with it the end of the consensus among English Protestants that there should be a single church imposed by the state, though there was still not complete freedom of religion. The ideals of the dissenting brethren of the Assembly were significant in the rise of denominationalism, the doctrine that the church is found in several institutions rather than a single one in a given location. Though Protestants already commonly recognized the validity of churches in different territories, the outcome of the Assembly's debates marks the wider acceptance of the idea that several true churches may be found in the same territory.

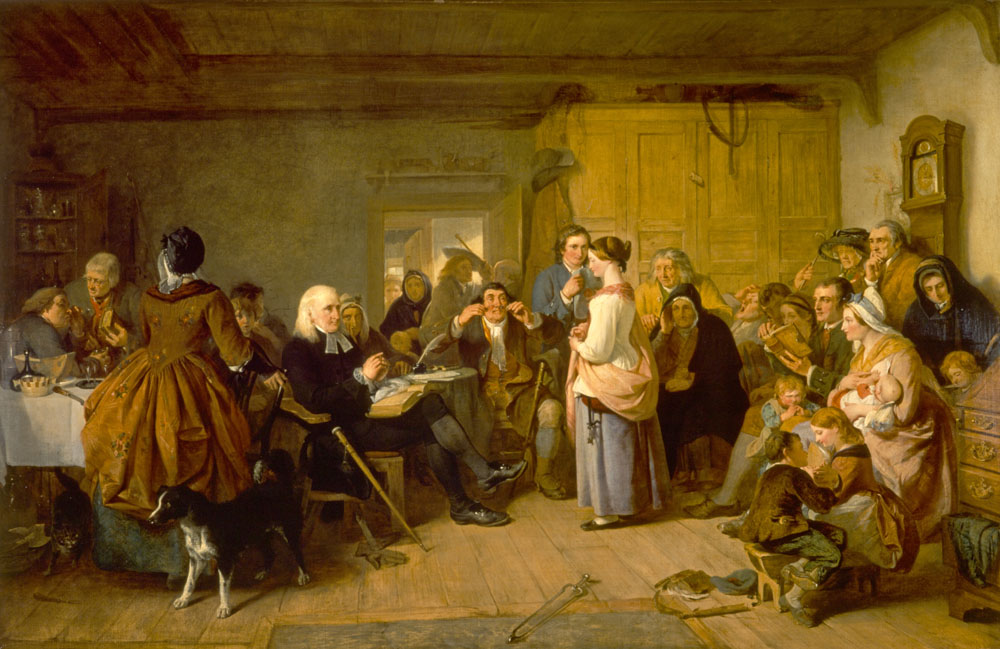
This painting by the Scottish artist John Phillip, entitled Presbyterian Catechising, depicts a minister examining a young woman in her knowledge of the catechism. The Westminster Shorter Catechism is a common catechism for Presbyterians.

The Confession produced by the Assembly was adopted with amendments by Congregationalists in England in the form of the 1658 Savoy Declaration, as well as by Particular Baptists in the form of the 1689 Baptist Confession. When the General Assembly of the Church of Scotland was reestablished in 1690 following the Glorious Revolution, it ratified the Westminster Confession, but not any other document produced at Westminster. The Confession remains, according to the 1929 Declaratory Articles, the Church of Scotland's "principal subordinate standard", subordinate to the Bible. Memorization of the Shorter Catechism has been made a requirement for children in many Presbyterian churches.

The migrations and missionary efforts of each of these groups lead to the widespread significance of the Westminster Assembly throughout the English-speaking world. The Assembly's Confession was particularly influential in American Protestant theology. It was included with congregationalist changes as part of the 1648 Cambridge Platform, a statement produced by ministers of colonial Massachusetts and the surrounding region, and again in colonial Connecticut as part of the 1708 Saybrook Platform. The Confession was modified for American Baptists in the 1707 Philadelphia Confession. The Adopting Act of 1729 required American Presbyterians to agree to the theology of the Assembly's Confession, and the Confession remains a part of the Presbyterian Church (USA)'s Book of Confessions. The Confession has been called "by far the most influential doctrinal symbol in American Protestant history" by the historian of religion Sydney E. Ahlstrom.

== Bibliography ==
- Benedict, Philip (2002). Christ's Churches Purely Reformed: A Social History of Calvinism. New Haven: Yale University Press. ISBN 978-0-300-10507-0.
- Bradbury, John P. (2013). Perpetually Reforming: A Theology of Church Reform and Renewal. London: T&T Clark. ISBN 978-0-567-64409-1.
- Barker, William S. (1994). "The Men and Parties of the Assembly". In Carlson, John L.; Hall, David W. (eds.). To Glorify and Enjoy God: A Commemoration of the 350th Anniversary of the Westminster Assembly. Edinburgh: Banner of Truth Trust. ISBN 978-0-85151-668-4.
- Bradley, Rosemary D. (1982). "The failure of accommodation: Religious Conflicts Between Presbyterians and Independents in the Westminster Assembly 1643–1646". Church History. 12: 23–47.
- Bremmer, Francis J. (2008). "The Puritan experiment in New England, 1630–60". In Coffey, John; Lim, Paul C. H. (eds.). The Cambridge Companion to Puritanism. ISBN 978-0-521-67800-1.
- Crowley, Weldon S. (Winter 1973). "Erastianism in the Westminster Assembly". Journal of Church and State. 15: 49–64. doi:10.1093/jcs/15.1.49.
- Fesko, J. V. (2014). The Theology of the Westminster Assembly. Wheaton, IL: Crossway. ISBN 978-1-4335-3311-2.
- Gatiss, Lee (December 2010). "A Deceptive Clarity? Particular Redemption in the Westminster Standards" (PDF). Reformed Theological Review. 69 (3): 180–196.
- Godfrey, W. Robert (1994). "The Westminster Larger Catechism". In Carlson, John L.; Hall, David W. (eds.). To Glorify and Enjoy God: A Commemoration of the 350th Anniversary of the Westminster Assembly. Edinburgh: Banner of Truth Trust. ISBN 978-0-85151-668-4.
- Holley, Larry Jackson (1979). The Divines of the Westminster Assembly: A Study of Puritanism and Parliament (PhD thesis). Yale University. OCLC 10169345.
- Hudson, Winthrop S. (March 1955). "Denominationalism as a Basis for Ecumenicity: A Seventeenth-Century Conception". Church History. 24 (1): 32–50. doi:10.2307/3161508. JSTOR 3161508. S2CID 162042515.
- Jones, Mark (2011). "The 'Old' Covenant". In Haykin, Michael A.G.; Jones, Mark (eds.). Drawn into Controversie: Reformed Theological Diversity and Debates Within Seventeenth-Century British Puritanism (PDF). Göttingen, Germany: Vandenhoeck & Ruprecht. ISBN 978-3-525-56945-0. Archived from the original (PDF) on 7 March 2016.
- Keeble, N. H. (2014). "Introduction: Attempting Uniformity". In Keeble, N. H. (ed.). 'Settling the Peace of the Church': 1662 Revisited. Oxford: Oxford University Press – via Oxford Scholarship Online.
- Kelly, Douglas F. (1994). "The Westminster Shorter Catechism". In Carlson, John L.; Hall, David W. (eds.). To Glorify and Enjoy God: A Commemoration of the 350th Anniversary of the Westminster Assembly. Edinburgh: Banner of Truth Trust. ISBN 978-0-85151-668-4.
- Leith, John H. (1973). Assembly at Westminster: Reformed Theology in the Making. Richmond, VA: John Knox Press. ISBN 978-0-8042-0885-7.
- Letham, Robert (2009). The Westminster Assembly: Reading Its Theology in Historical Context. The Westminster Assembly and the Reformed Faith. Phillipsburg, NJ: P&R Publishing. ISBN 978-0-87552-612-6.
- —————— (2010). "Catholicity Global and Historical: Constantinople, Westminster, and the Church in the Twenty-First Century" (PDF). Westminster Theological Journal. 72: 43–57. Archived from the original (PDF) on 2 May 2012.
- Logan, Samuel T. Jr. (1994). "The Context and Work of the Assembly". In Carlson, John L.; Hall, David W. (eds.). To Glorify and Enjoy God: A Commemoration of the 350th Anniversary of the Westminster Assembly. Edinburgh: Banner of Truth Trust. ISBN 978-0-85151-668-4.
- Moore, Jonathan D. (2011). "The Extent of the Atonement: English Hypothetical Universalism versus Particular Redemption". In Haykin, Michael A.G.; Jones, Mark (eds.). Drawn into Controversie: Reformed Theological Diversity and Debates Within Seventeenth-Century British Puritanism (PDF). Göttingen, Germany: Vandenhoeck & Ruprecht. ISBN 978-3-525-56945-0. Archived from the original (PDF) on 7 March 2016.
- Muller, Richard A. (2003a). After Calvin: Studies in the Development of a Theological Tradition. New York: Oxford University Press. doi:10.1093/acprof:oso/9780195157017.001.0001. ISBN 978-0-19-515701-7 – via Oxford Scholarship Online.
- —————— (2003b). Post-Reformation Reformed Dogmatics: Prolegomena to Theology. Vol. 1. Grand Rapids, MI: Baker. ISBN 978-0-8010-2617-1.
- Paul, Robert S. (1985). The Assembly of the Lord: Politics and Religion in the Westminster Assembly and the 'Grand Debate'. Edinburgh: T&T Clark. ISBN 978-0-567-09341-7.
- Rogers, Jack (1985). Presbyterian Creeds: A Guide to the Book of Confessions. Louisville, KY: Westminster John Knox. ISBN 978-0-664-25496-4.
- Spear, Wayne R. (2013) [1976]. Covenanted Uniformity in Religion: the Influence of the Scottish Commissioners on the Ecclesiology of the Westminster Assembly. Grand Rapids, MI: Reformation Heritage Books. ISBN 978-1-60178-244-1.
- ———————— (1994). "The Unfinished Westminster Catechism". In Carlson, John L.; Hall, David W. (eds.). To Glorify and Enjoy God: A Commemoration of the 350th Anniversary of the Westminster Assembly. Edinburgh: Banner of Truth Trust. ISBN 978-0-85151-668-4.
- ———————— (1993). "A Brief History of the Westminster Assembly". Evangel. 11 (3): 73–76.
- Troxel, A. Craig (1996). "Amyraut 'at' the Assembly: The Westminster Confession of Faith and the Extent of the Atonement". Presbyterion. 22 (1): 43–55.
- Van Dixhoorn, Chad (2015). "Westminster assembly (act. 1643–1652)". Oxford Dictionary of National Biography (online ed.). Oxford University Press. doi:10.1093/ref:odnb/92780. (Subscription, Wikipedia Library access or UK public library membership required.)
- ————————, ed. (2012). The Minutes and Papers of the Westminster Assembly, 1643–1652. Vol. 1. Oxford: Oxford University Press. ISBN 978-0-19-920683-4.
- ———————— (2009). "The Strange Silence of Prolocutor Twisse: Predestination and Politics in the Westminster Assembly's Debate over Justification". Sixteenth Century Journal. 40 (2): 395–41.
- ———————— (Summer 2001). "Unity and Disunity at the Westminster Assembly (1643–1649): A Commemorative Essay". Journal of Presbyterian History. 79 (2): 103–117.
- ———————— (2004). "New Taxonomies Of The Westminster Assembly (1643–52): The Creedal Controversy As Case Study". Reformation and Renaissance Review. 6 (1): 82–106. doi:10.1558/rarr.6.1.82.52510. S2CID 218621194.
- de Witt, John Richard (1969). Jus Divinum: The Westminster Assembly and the Divine Right of Church Government (Th.D. thesis). Kampen, the Netherlands: J. H. Kok. OCLC 31994.
- ————————— (1994). "The Form of Church Government". In Carlson, John L.; Hall, David W. (eds.). To Glorify and Enjoy God: A Commemoration of the 350th Anniversary of the Westminster Assembly. Edinburgh: Banner of Truth Trust. ISBN 978-0-85151-668-4.
- Yule, George (May–August 1974). "English Presbyterianism and the Westminster Assembly". The Reformed Theological Review. 33 (2): 33–44.
