= Jacobus Revius =

Dutch poet

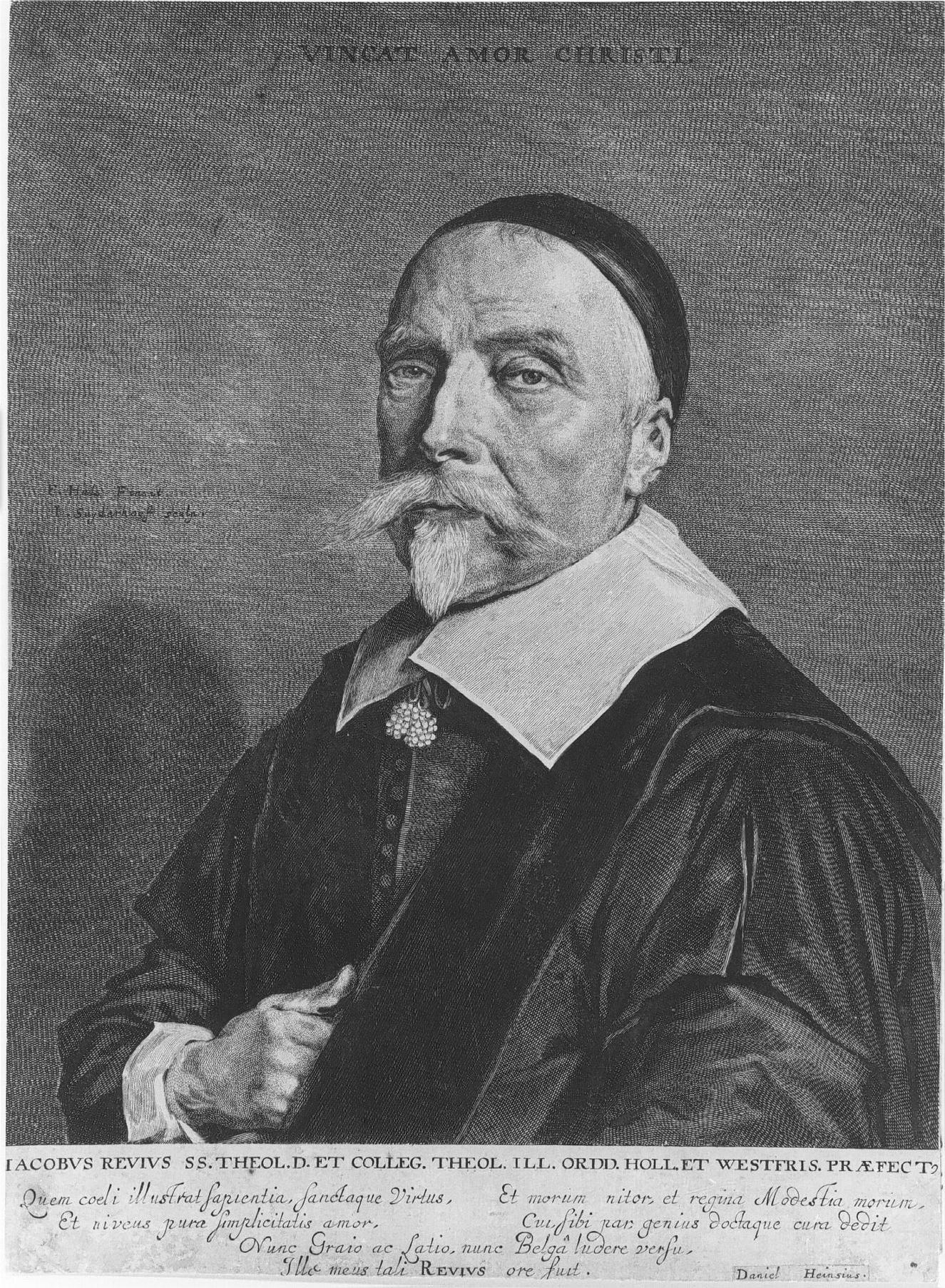
- Born: Jakob Reefsen; November 1586; Deventer, Lordship of Overijssel
- Died: November 15, 1658; Leiden, Holland, Dutch Republic
- Occupations: poet, theologian, church historian

Jacobus Revius (born Jacob Reefsen; November 1586 – 15 November 1658) was a Dutch poet, Calvinist theologian and church historian. His most renowned collection of poems, the Over-ysselsche Sangen en Dichten (1630), forms a high point of Dutch baroque. According to Pieter Geyl,

…the real spirit of Calvinism, in its unimpeachable austerity, in its ferocity as well as in its self-abnegation, was personified in Revius […]

== Life ==
Revius was born in Deventer, the son of the town's mayor, Ryck Reefsen, during the Dutch Revolt. Not long after his birth, in 1587, Deventer fell into Spanish hands and his mother fled with him to Amsterdam where he was raised. He was educated at Leiden (1604–07) and Franeker (1607–10), and in 1610-1612 visited various foreign universities, particularly the Academy of Saumur, Montauban, and Orléans. Here, he got acquainted with Renaissance poetry which would have a big influence on his own poetry. Returning to the Netherlands, he held brief pastorates at Zeddam, Winterswijk, and Aalten in 1613, and by Oct., 1614, he had become pastor in his native city of Deventer, where he remained twenty-seven years. In 1618 he was appointed librarian of the Fraterhuis, and in the same year the Synod of Dort assigned him a part in the new revision of the Dutch translation of the Old Testament; the Statenvertaling. The committee of translators and revisers, which convened at Leiden in 1633-34, made Revius secretary. He likewise took an active part in the establishment of the Athenaeum at Deventer in 1630, and was influential in calling the first professors. From 1641 he was regent at the State Seminary at the University of Leiden.

His closing years were embittered by the rise of Cartesianism, to which he was intensely opposed. A rare Hebrew scholar, Revius was also a prolific writer. He showed, however, a domineering disposition and exercised a vehement polemic, as shown in his struggle with Cartesianism and the Remonstrants. While endeavoring to avoid the contemporary controversy whether men might wear long hair, he was obliged to defend his moderate position. He died in Leiden.

== Thought ==
Revius’ work is sometimes passionately militant, sometimes deeply devout and religious, Calvinistic but also Renaissancistic. His Over-Ysselsche Sangen en Dichten of 1630 contains both a long section of poems on Biblical topics, and mixed secular poems. It was heavily influenced by French Catholic literature.

Against the Remonstrants he wrote Schriftuurlijk tegen Bericht van de Leere der Gereformeerde Kerken aengaende de goddelijke Predestinatie ende andere aen-clevende Poineten (Deventer, 1617); against Anglican and royal absolutist Robert Filmer's Patriarcha, itself a disputation against the political doctrines of Suarez and Bellarmine, Revius wrote his Suarez Repurgatus (Leyden 1648); against the Cartesians he wrote especially his Statera philosophise Cartesiante (Leyden, 1650) and Theke, hoc eat levitas defensionia Cartesian (Letter, 1653). In support of the rights of the Church he wrote his Examen ... seu de potestate magistratuum reformatorum circa res erelesiastieas (Amsterdam, 1642), and his Uittreksels ... over de macht der merheid in het afzetten van predikanten (Leyden, 1650).

His most famous poem is Hy droegh onse smerten (He carried our sorrows) with its first line "T' en sijn de Joden niet, Heer Jesu, die u cruysten" (It's not the Jews, Lord Jesus, who crucified you). Although in this poem Revius seems to stand up for the Jews, he is believed to have been anti-Semitic, as a Christian, and especially a Calvinist, was expected to be in those days. Much of Revius' other work is steeped in anti-Semitism.

== Legacy ==
In his own time, Revius was not popular and he was mostly known for his controversial writings and his history of Deventer; Daventriae illustratae (1651). Today, he is one of the few 17th century Dutch poets whose work is still being read and sung. Het Liedboek voor de Kerken, the most commonly used hymn book in the Netherlands, features seven of his poems in modernized spelling.

In many towns in the Netherlands, streets have been named after him, such as Reviusdreef (Revius avenue) in Leiderdorp, Reviusplein (Revius square) in Maassluis, Reviusstraat (Revius street) in Hazerswoude-Rijndijk and de Jacobs Reviuslaan (the Jacob Revius lane) in Eindhoven.

== Works ==
- Suarez repurgatus sive syllabus Disputationum metaphysicarum, Lugduni, 1648.
- Methodi Cartesianæ consideratio theologica, Lugduni, 1648.
- Statera philosophiae Cartesianae, Lugduni, 1650.
- Selected Poems of Jacobus Revius, Dutch Metaphysical Poet, Detroit, Wayne State University Press, 1968.
