= Thomas Goodwin =

17th century Puritan Theologian

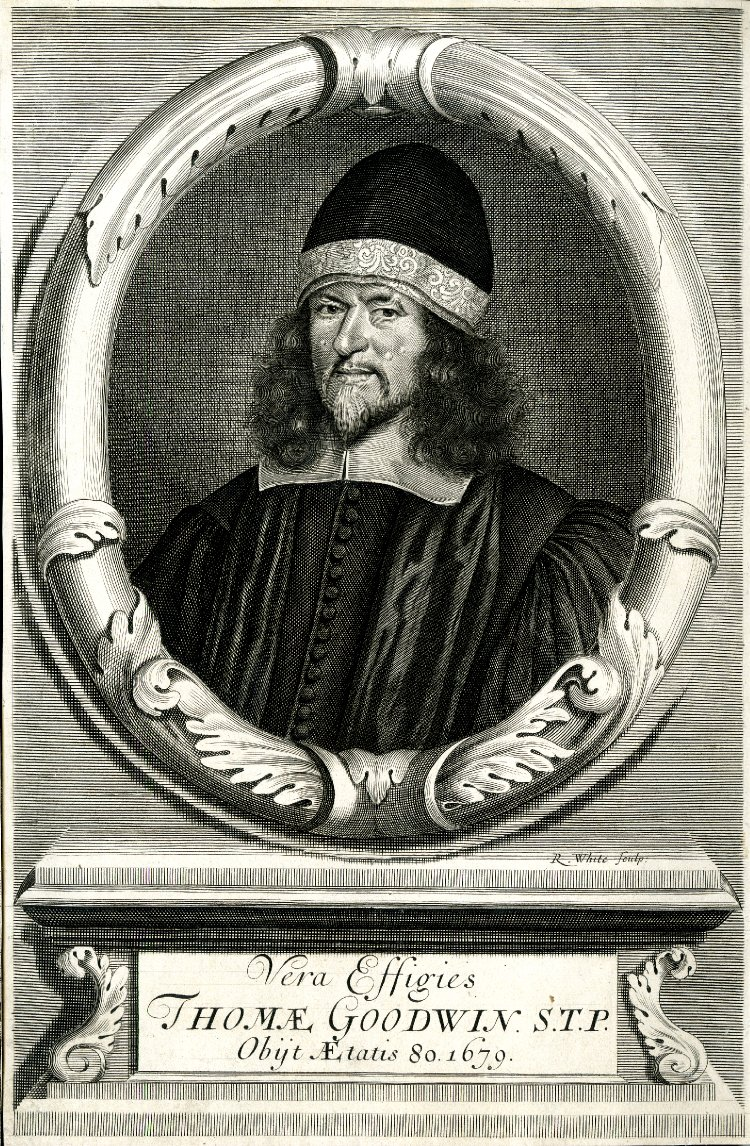
Thomas Goodwin.

Thomas Goodwin (Rollesby, Norfolk, 5 October 1600 – 23 February 1680), known as "the Elder", was an English Puritan theologian and preacher, and an important leader of religious Independents. He served as chaplain to Oliver Cromwell, and was appointed by Parliament as President of Magdalen College, Oxford, in 1650. Christopher Hill places Goodwin in the "main stream of Puritan thought".

== Early life ==
He studied at Cambridge from August 1613. He was an undergraduate of Christ's College, Cambridge, graduating with a B.A. in 1616.

In 1619 he removed to Catharine Hall, where in 1620 he was elected fellow. At this time he was influenced by John Rogers of Dedham. Goodwin rode 35 miles from Cambridge to Dedham to hear this Puritan preacher. In 1625 he was licensed a preacher of the university; and three years afterwards he became lecturer of Holy Trinity Church, Cambridge, successor to John Preston, to the vicarage of which he was presented by the king in 1632.

== Dissenter ==
Worried by his bishop, who was a zealous adherent of William Laud, he resigned all his preferments and left the university in 1634; he became a Congregationalist. He lived for some time in London, where in 1638 he married the daughter of an alderman. In 1639 he fled to Holland to escape persecution. For some time he was pastor of a small congregation of English merchants and refugees at Arnhem. He returned shortly after the inception of the Long Parliament. He ministered for some years to the Independent congregation meeting at Paved Alley Church, Lime Street, in the parish of St Dunstans-in-the-East, and rapidly rose to considerable eminence as a preacher.

== Puritan leader ==
In 1643 he was chosen a member of the Westminster Assembly, and at once identified himself with the Independent party, generally referred to in contemporary documents as the "dissenting brethren" and was one of the authors of An Apologeticall Narration. He frequently preached by appointment before the Commons, and in January 1650 his talents and learning were rewarded by the House with the presidency of Magdalen College, Oxford, a post which he held until the Restoration of 1660.

In December 1655 Goodwin attended the Whitehall Conference on the resettlement on the Jews, where he (with fellow Independent Philip Nye) argued for readmittance on the grounds that England was being punished by God for not readmitting the Jews, which was necessary for their conversion. He was chaplain to Oliver Cromwell from 1656. He rose into high favour with Cromwell, and was one of his intimate advisers, attending him on his death-bed.

He was also a commissioner for the inventory of the Westminster Assembly, 1650, and for the approbation of preachers, 1653, and together with John Owen led a committee of six that drew up the Savoy Declaration, an amended form of Westminster Confession in 1658.

From 1660 until his death, he lived in London, in the parish of St Bartholomew-the-Great, and devoted himself exclusively to theological study and to the pastoral charge of the Fetter Lane Independent Church. By the early 1670s he was in poor health, and he eventually died on 23 February 1680 ["An Exposition of Ephesians, Chapter 1 to 2:10"]. He was buried in Bunhill Fields burial ground: the Latin epitaph for his tomb, composed by Thomas Gilbert, was censored.

== Works ==
The works published by Goodwin during his lifetime consist chiefly of sermons printed by order of the House of Commons. He was also associated with Philip Nye and others in the preparation of the Apologeticall Narration (1643).

In 1645 Goodwin published his treatise The Heart of Christ in Heaven towards Sinners on Earth, which was quickly reprinted, and translated into German. This work has been claimed to be an inspiration for the Roman Catholic devotion to the Sacred Heart.

Five volumes of his sermons and other works were published from 1682 to 1704. They have been reprinted at least 47 times. His collected writings, which include expositions of the Epistle to the Ephesians and of the Apocalypse, were published in five folio volumes between 1681 and 1704, and were reprinted in twelve 8vo volumes (Edinburgh, 1861–1866).

Edmund Calamy the Elder's estimated Goodwin's qualities as "a considerable scholar and an eminent divine, and had a very happy faculty in descanting upon Scripture so as to bring forth surprising remarks, which yet generally tended to illustration."

A memoir, derived from his own papers, by his son Thomas Goodwin the Younger, Independent minister and author of the History of the Reign of Henry V, is prefixed to the fifth volume of his collected works. As a patriarch and Atlas of Independency he is also noticed by Anthony Wood in the Athenae Oxonienses.

An amusing sketch, from Joseph Addison's point of view, of the austere and somewhat fanatical president of Magdalen, is preserved in No. 494 of The Spectator.

Academic offices
Preceded by John Wilkinson	President of Magdalen College, Oxford; 1650–1660	Succeeded by John Oliver
