= Jeremiah Burroughs =

English preacher (1599–1646)

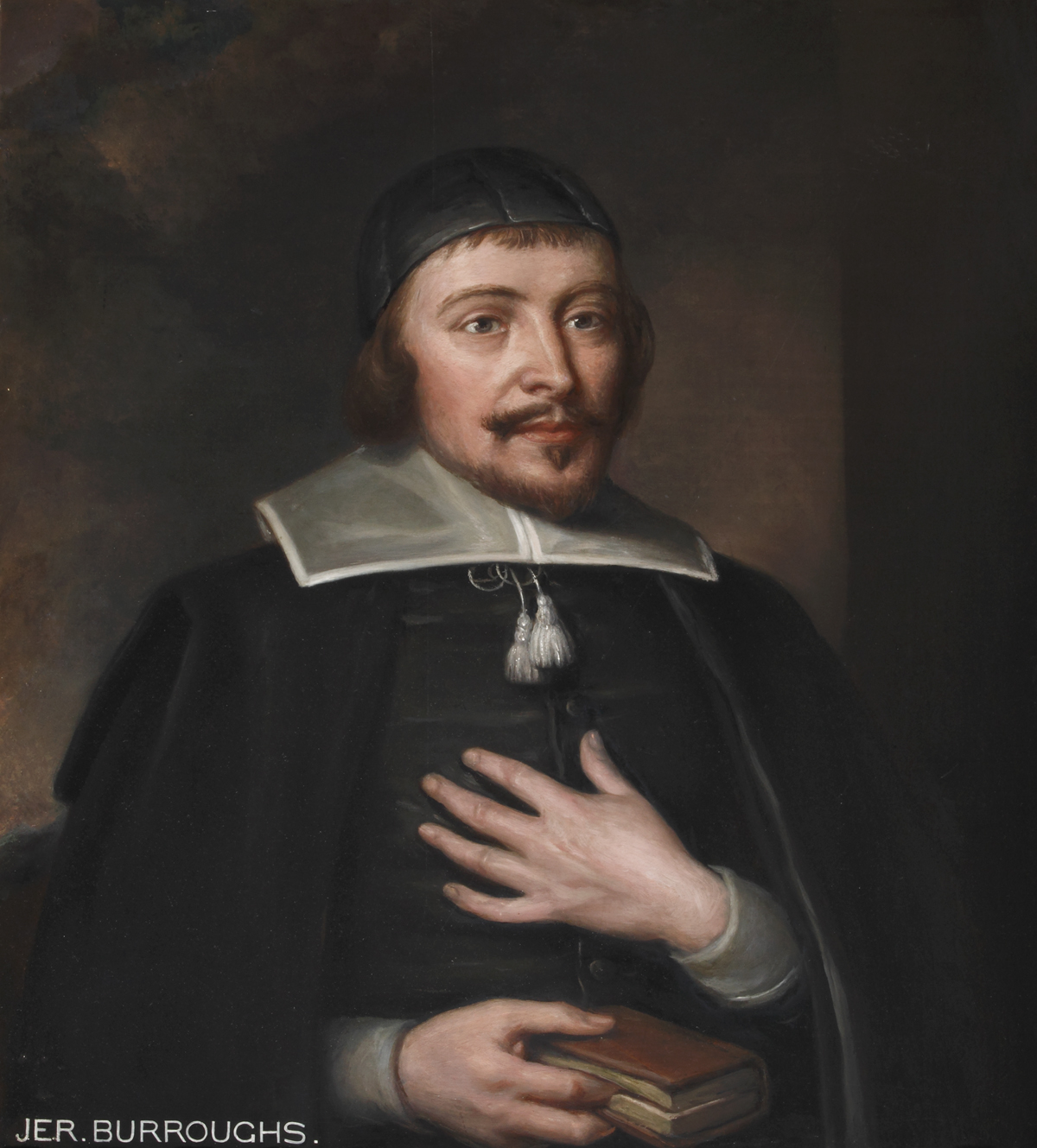
Jeremiah Burroughs

Jeremiah Burroughs (sometimes Burroughes; 1599 – London, 13 November, 1646) was an English Congregationalist and a well-known Puritan preacher.

== Biography ==
Burroughs studied at Emmanuel College, Cambridge, and was graduated M.A. in 1624, but left the university because of non-conformity. He was assistant to Edmund Calamy at Bury St. Edmunds, and in 1631 became rector of Tivetshall, Norfolk. He was suspended for non-conformity in 1636 and soon afterward deprived, he went to Rotterdam (1637) and became "teacher" of the English church there. He returned to England in 1641 and served as preacher at Stepney and Cripplegate, London. He was a member of the Westminster Assembly and one of the few who opposed the Presbyterian majority. He was one of the Five Dissenting Brethren who put their names to the Independent manifesto, An Apologeticall Narration in early 1644. While one of the most distinguished of the English Independents, he was one of the most moderate, acting consistently in accordance with the motto on his study door (in Latin and Greek): "Opinionum varietas et opinantium unitas non sunt ασυστατα" ("Difference of belief and unity of believers are not inconsistent"). In 1646, Burroughs died from complications resulting from a fall from his horse on the way back from the Westminster Assembly.

== Publications ==
Burroughs' publications were many, one of the most important being An Exposition with Practical Observations on the Prophecy of Hosea (4 vols., London, 1643–57), which, along with a number of his other works, has been recently reprinted:

- Commentary on the Prophecy of Hosea (ISBN 1-877611-03-4)
- The Rare Jewel of Christian Contentment (ISBN 1-878442-28-7 and ISBN 0-85151-091-4)
- Learning to be Happy (ISBN 0-946462-16-X)
- The Evil of Evils: The Exceeding Sinfulness of Sin (ISBN 1-877611-48-4)
- Hope (ISBN 1-57358-171-2)
- A Treatise on Earthly-Mindedness (ISBN 1-877611-38-7)
- The Excellency of a Gracious Spirit: Delivered in a Treatise on Numbers 14:24 (ISBN 1-57358-024-4)
- Irenicum: Healing the Divisions Among God's People (ISBN 1-57358-058-9)
- The Saint's Happiness: Sermons on the Beatitudes (ISBN 99906-44-66-7 and ISBN 1-877611-00-X)
- The Saint's Treasury: Being Sundry Sermons Preached in London (ISBN 1-877611-30-1)
- Gospel Worship, Or, the Right Manner of Sanctifying the Name of God (ISBN 1-877611-12-3)
- Gospel Fear (ISBN 1-877611-31-X)
- Gospel Conversation (ISBN 1-877611-91-3)
- Gospel Revelation (ISBN 1-56769-069-6)
- Gospel Remission (ISBN 1-57358-014-7)
- Gospel Reconciliation, Or, Christ's Trumpet of Peace to the World (ISBN 1-57358-042-2)
- The saints happinesse (1660)
  - https://archive.org/details/saintshappiness00greegoog OL 6327413M
