= Independent (religion) =

Congregationalist Christian denomination

In Welsh and English church history, Independents were a Puritan group who advocated local congregational control of religious and church matters, without any wider geographical hierarchy, either ecclesiastical or political. They were particularly prominent during the Wars of the Three Kingdoms as well under the Commonwealth and Protectorate. The New Model Army became the champion of Independent religious views and its members helped carry out Pride's Purge in December 1648.

Unlike their Presbyterian allies, Independents rejected any state role in religious practice, including the Church of England, and advocated freedom of religion for most non-Catholics. Their religious views led some to back radical political groups such as the Levellers, who supported concepts like Republicanism, universal suffrage and joint ownership of property.

The Independents later became known as the Congregationalists, who are part of the wider Reformed tradition of Christianity.

== History ==
At the outbreak of the First English Civil War in August 1642, the cause of Parliament was supported by an uneasy alliance between traditional members of the Church of England, those who wanted to reform it into a Presbyterian polity and Independents, who rejected any idea of a state church. Led by John Pym, the Presbyterian party was in the ascendant in the period leading up to the war and during its early years. However, as negotiations with the Scottish Covenanters over the 1643 Solemn League and Covenant demonstrated, the Independents proved strong enough to prevent Presbyterianism being imposed on them.

The Independents grew in strength after the formation of the New Model Army in 1645 since their members held many of the senior positions, Oliver Cromwell being the most famous. As a result, moderate English Presbyterians like Denzil Holles and the Scots Covenanters came to see them as more dangerous than the Royalists and an alliance between these groups led to the 1648 Second English Civil War. Following a Parliamentarian victory, in December 1648 Independent sympathisers within the Army helped remove their opponents from Parliament in what has become known as Pride's Purge. This action produced a so-called "Rump Parliament" of around fifty Independent MPs who sanctioned the Execution of Charles I in January 1649 and created the Commonwealth of England. They dominated English politics until shortly before the Stuart Restoration in 1660.

The Cavalier Parliament that took office in 1661 was dominated by former Royalists and moderate Parliamentarians who imposed the Clarendon Code. Combined with the Test Act, this excluded all nonconformists from holding civil or military office, and prevented them being awarded degrees by the universities of Cambridge and Oxford.

Many nonconformists later migrated to the North American colonies.

== See also ==
- 17th century denominations in England
- English Dissenters
- Good Old Cause
- Quakers
