= The Feoffees for Impropriation =

The Feoffees for impropriations was an unincorporated organization dedicated to advancing the cause of Puritanism in England. It was formally in existence from 1625 to 1633.

== Background ==
The Elizabethan Religious Settlement established an uneasy truce between Catholics and Protestants that brought the English Reformation to a conclusion and shaped the theology and liturgy of the Church of England. It was a compromise that was not completely satisfactory to either party. During the reign of James I, Puritanism was neither officially tolerated nor actively suppressed. With the succession of Charles I and the increasing power of William Laud, greater prominence was given to the requirement for adherence to the doctrine and liturgy of the established church. Puritans regarded this as a direct attack and responded by various overt and covert moves to resist the increasing Arminianism of the Church of England. In 1626, the York House Conference. chaired by the Duke of Buckingham, was held to discuss theological differences between Puritans and Arminians. At the second session, the Puritan case was led by John Preston, however Buckingham came down in favour of Laud.

== Establishment ==
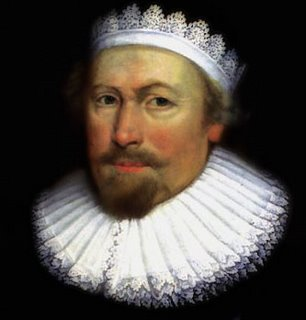
Richard Sibbes (1577–1635) served as one of the Feoffees for Impropriations, who were organized in 1625 to support Puritanism in the Church of England.

When Preston realised that the York House Conference was not likely to favour Puritanism, he encouraged a group of Puritan lawyers, merchants, and clergymen (including Richard Sibbes and John Davenport) to establish an organization known as the Feoffees for the Purchase of Impropriations. The feoffees would raise funds to purchase lay impropriations and advowsons, which would mean that the feoffees would then have the legal right to appoint their chosen candidates to benefices and lectureships. This would provide a mechanism both for increasing the number of preaching ministers in the country, and a way to ensure that Puritans could receive ecclesiastical appointments.

The group considered obtaining letters patent, or securing an Act of Parliament, but did not pursue this course. Twelve trustees were appointed - four clergymen, four lawyers and four merchants. A chairman was appointed in case the trustee split six - six on an issue. Over the few years that the feoffees were in existence, a number of trustees died and were replaced. The final chairman was Nicholas Rainton, at the time, Lord Mayor of London.

== Activities ==
The feoffees began raising money by donations and using it to support their aims. They also used the donations to purchase the right to tithes which would give them a continuing income. Their primary purpose was to provide a pulpit for Puritan clergymen. They purchased advowsons, established lectureships and provided direct financial support to individual clergymen. However, they were careful to ensure that they only supported those whose opinions they approved of. Purchases were made by individual trustees since the feoffees had no formal corporate existence. Although the trustees purchased advowsons, they had made relatively few presentations before their activities came to the notice of the authorities.

== Suppression ==
In 1629, Peter Heylin, a Magdalen don, preached a sermon in St Mary's denouncing the Feoffees for Impropriations for sowing tares among the wheat. Archbishop Laud believed these activities seemed "a cunning way, under a glorious pretence, to overthrow the Church Government, by getting into their power more dependency of the clergy, than the King, and all the Peers, and all the Bishops in all the kingdom had". As a result of the publicity, William Noy began to prosecute feoffees in the Exchequer court. Their lawyers were William Lenthall, later Speaker of the Long Parliament, and Robert Holborne, later counsel to Hampden and Prynne. The feoffees' defense was that all of the men they had had appointed to office conformed to the Church of England. Nevertheless, in 1632, the Feoffees for Impropriations were dissolved and the group's assets forfeited to the crown: Charles ordered that the money should be used to augment the salary of incumbents and used for other pious uses not controlled by the Puritans. This suppression of the Feoffees, by legal action, was an early move of Laudianism.

== Rehabilitation ==
When the Long Parliament was called following the period of personal rule by Charles I, attempts were made by MPs to overturn the suppression of the feoffees. In 1643, the House of Commons ordered the return of the money that had been taken by the King. In 1648, the surviving trustees secured a formal reversal of the previous court order from the House of Lords. However, the activities of the feoffees were never resumed, perhaps because under the English republic, they were considered unnecessary. John Marshall, one of the trustees bequeathed money and property for the erection of a new church in Southwark, but the feoffees were dissolved before the bequest was acted upon. In the late 17th century, new trustees were established to hold the advowson of the newly built church financed by the bequest - a single remaining legacy of the feoffees.
