= History of the Puritans under King Charles I =

Puritan history of 1618–1649

Under Charles I, the Puritans became a political force as well as a religious tendency in the country. Opponents of the royal prerogative became allies of Puritan reformers, who saw the Church of England moving in a direction opposite to what they wanted, and objected to increased Catholic influence both at Court and (as they saw it) within the Church.

After the First English Civil War political power was held by various factions of Puritans. The trials and executions of William Laud and then King Charles were decisive moves shaping British history. While in the short term Puritan power was consolidated by the Parliamentary armed forces and Oliver Cromwell, in the same years, the argument for theocracy failed to convince enough of the various groupings, and there was no Puritan religious settlement to match Cromwell's gradual assumption of dictatorial powers. The distinctive formulation of Reformed theology in the Westminster Assembly would prove to be its lasting legacy.

In New England, immigration of what were Puritan family groups and congregations was at its peak for the middle years of King Charles's reign.

== Synod of Dort to the death of Archbishop Abbot (1618–1633) ==
The 1630s conflict between Puritans and traditional Episcopalians over Laudianism in the Church of England was preceded by similar arguments in the 1620s concerning Arminianism. Its rejection of some of the key tenets of Calvinism, notably the Calvinist view of Predestination, made it particularly objectionable to Puritans, who viewed it as crypto-Catholic. This theological debate was sharpened by the outbreak of the Thirty Years War in 1618 and recommencement of the Eighty Years' War between the Dutch Republic and Spain in 1621, leading many to see it as part of a general attack on Protestantism. (Note: A perspective summarised in 1641 by Francis Rous; "For Arminianism is the span of a Papist, and if you mark it well, you shall see an Arminian reaching to a Papist, a Papist to a Jesuit, a Jesuit to the Pope, and the other to the King of Spain. And having kindled fire in our neighbours, they now seek to set on flame this kingdom also.")

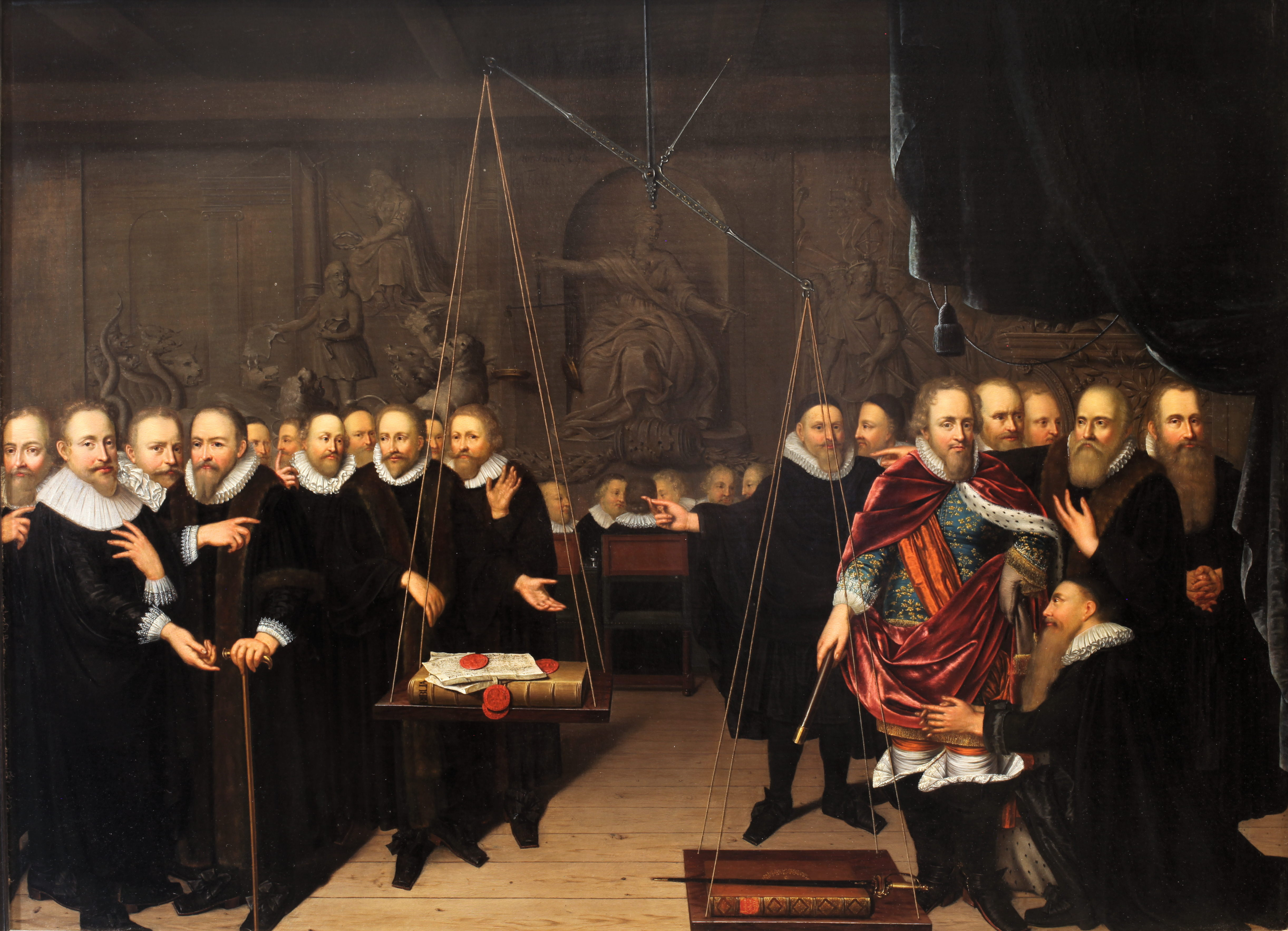
The Synod of Dort, painted in 1721 by the Arminian Abraham van der Eyk. It depicts what many Americans thought about the Synod: the Bible on the Arminian side is outweighed by Calvin's Institutes on the other, along with a sword representing the power of the state.

As a Calvinist, James I of England generally backed his co-religionists in the debate between Calvinists and Arminians. He sent a strong delegation to the 1618–1619 Synod of Dort held in the Dutch Republic, and supported their condemnation of Arminianism as heretical, although he moderated his views when attempting to achieve a Spanish match for his son Charles, Prince of Wales. The English were less precise than their Dutch counterparts in their interpretation of "Arminianism", which allowed James some flexibility.

James died in 1625 and was succeeded by Charles, who was distrustful of the Puritans, seeing their views on church government and foreign policy as driven by political calculation, while also constituting a direct challenge to his own exercise of his divinely granted authority as Supreme Head of the Church of England. While King Charles had no particular interest in theological questions, he preferred the emphasis of William Laud and the Caroline divines on order, decorum, uniformity, and High Church Anglicanism. While his father had supported the Calvinist rulings of the Synod of Dort, Charles forbade Anglican sermons defending predestination altogether, and where James had been lenient towards clergy who omitted parts of the Book of Common Prayer, Charles urged the bishops to enforce compliance and to suspend Vicars who refused.

Besides George Villiers, 1st Duke of Buckingham, Charles's closest political advisor was William Laud, the Bishop of St David's, whom Charles translated to the better position of Bishop of Bath and Wells in 1626. Under Laud's influence, Charles shifted the royal ecclesiastical policy markedly.

=== Conflict between Charles I and Puritans, 1625–1629 ===
In 1625, shortly before the opening of the new parliament, Charles was married by proxy to Princess Henrietta Maria of France, the Catholic daughter of King Henri IV. In diplomatic terms this implied alliance with France in preparation for war against Spain, but Puritan MPs openly claimed that Charles was preparing to restrict the recusancy laws and even to grant Catholic Emancipation. The king had indeed agreed to do so in the secret marriage treaty he negotiated with his future brother in law, King Louis XIII.

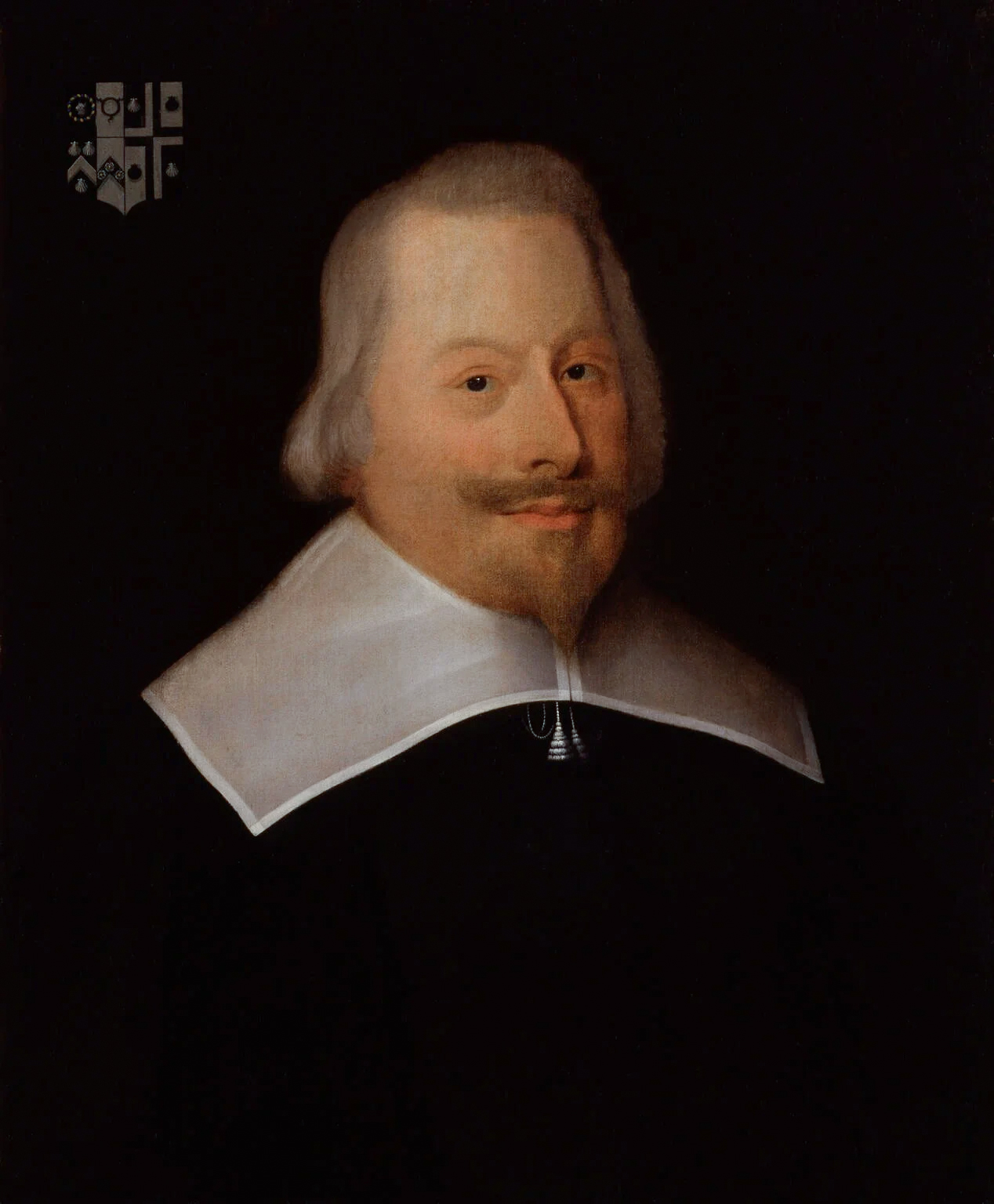
John Pym (1584–1643), Puritan MP who spoke out against Richard Montagu in 1625

George Abbot, Archbishop of Canterbury from 1611, was in the mainstream of the English church, sympathetic with Scottish Protestants, anti-Catholic in a conventional Calvinist way, and theologically opposed to Arminianism. Under Elizabeth I he had associated with Puritan figures. The controversy over Richard Montagu's anti-Calvinist New Gagg was still ongoing when Parliament met in May 1625, and he was attacked in Parliament by the Puritan MP John Pym. When Montagu wrote a pamphlet asking for Royal protection entitled Appello Caesarem or "I Appeal to Caesar", a reference to Acts 25:10–12, Charles responded by making him a royal chaplain.

Parliament was reluctant to grant Charles revenue, since they feared that it might be used to support an army that would re-impose Catholicism on England. The 1625 Parliament broke the precedent of centuries and voted to allow Charles to collect Tonnage and Poundage only for one year. When Charles wanted to intervene in the Thirty Years' War by declaring war on Spain (the Anglo-Spanish War (1625)), Parliament granted him an insufficient sum of £140,000. The war with Spain went ahead (partially funded by tonnage and poundage collected by Charles after he was no longer authorized to do so). Buckingham was put in charge of the war effort, but failed.

The York House conference of 1626 saw battle lines start to be drawn. Opponents cast doubt on the political loyalties of the Puritans, equating their beliefs with resistance theory. In their preaching, Arminians began to take a royalist line. Abbot was deprived of effective power in 1627, in a quarrel with the king over Robert Sibthorpe, one such royalist cleric. Richard Montagu was made Bishop of Chichester in 1628.

The Anglo-French War (1627–1629) was also a military failure. Parliament called for Buckingham's replacement, but Charles stuck by him. Parliament went on to pass the Petition of Right, a declaration of Parliament's rights. Charles accepted the Petition, though this did not lead to a change in his behaviour.

=== The King's personal rule ===
In August 1628, Buckingham was assassinated by a disillusioned soldier, John Felton. Public reaction angered Charles. When Parliament resumed in January 1629, Charles was met with outrage over the case of John Rolle, an MP who had been prosecuted for failing to pay Tonnage and Poundage. John Finch, the Speaker of the House of Commons, was held down in the Speaker's Chair in order to allow the House to pass a resolution condemning the king.

Charles determined to rule without calling a parliament, thus initiating the period known as his Personal Rule (1629–1640). This period saw the ascendancy of Laudianism in England.

=== Laudianism ===
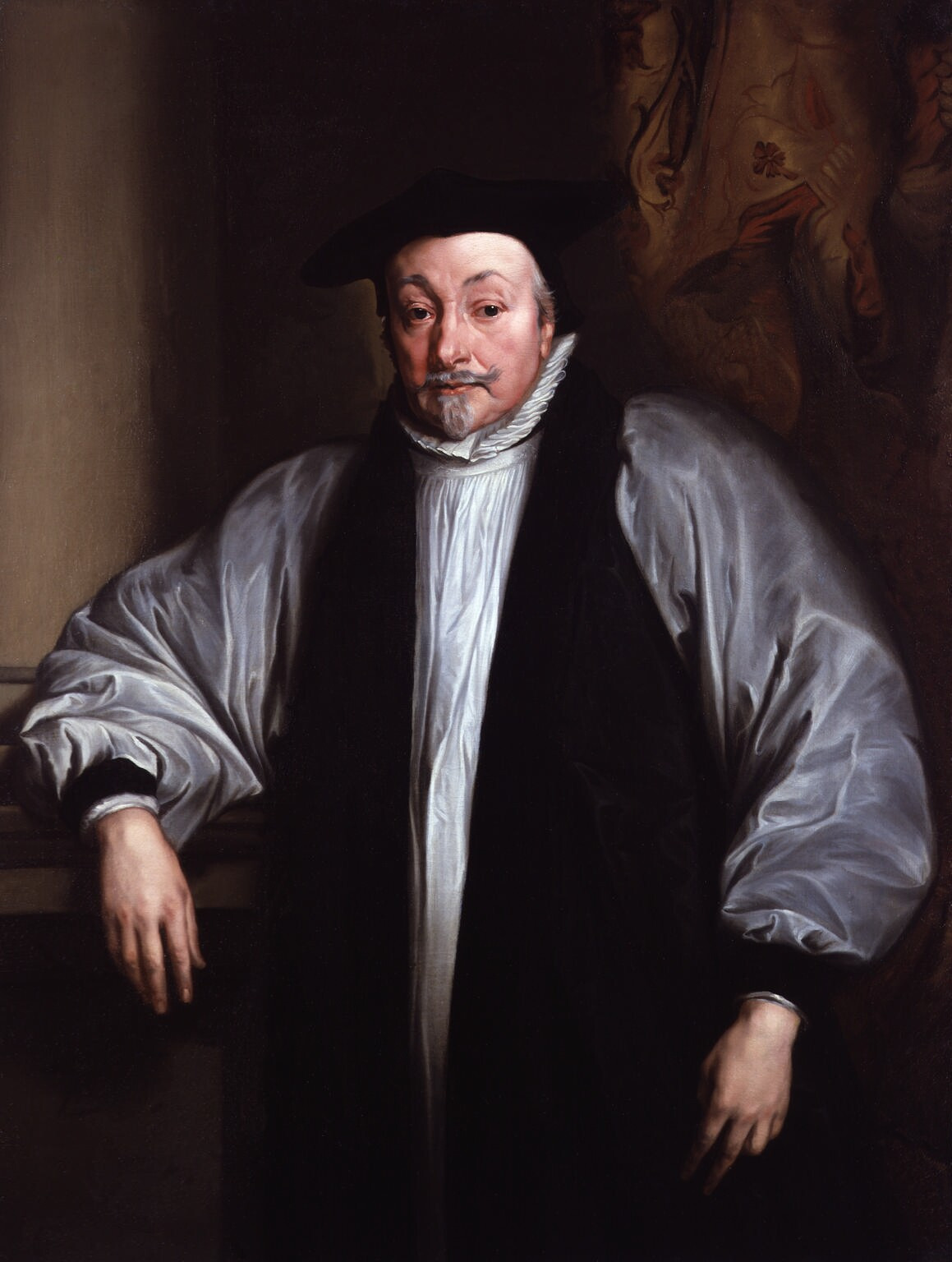
William Laud (1573–1645), Archbishop of Canterbury from 1633 to 1645; a close advisor to Charles I, and architect of Laudianism, was executed by Parliament in 1645.

The central ideal of Laudianism (the common name for the ecclesiastical policies pursued by Charles and Laud) was the "beauty of holiness" (a reference to Psalm 29:2). This emphasized a love of ceremony and harmonious liturgy. Many of the churches in England had fallen into disrepair in the wake of the English Reformation: Laudianism called for making churches beautiful. Churches were ordered to make repairs and to enforce greater respect for the church building.

A policy particularly odious to the Puritans was the installation of altar rails in churches, which Puritans associated with the Catholic position on Transubstantiation and the Real Presence in the Blessed Sacrament: in Catholic practice, altar rails served to demarcate the space where Christ became incarnate in the host, with only priests, acolytes, and altar boys allowed inside the rail. The Puritans also alleged that the practice of receiving communion while kneeling at the altar rail resembled Eucharistic adoration. The Laudians insisted on kneeling at communion and receiving at the rail, while continuing to use the Book of Common Prayer and rejecting Catholicism.

Puritans also objected to the Laudian insistence on calling members of the Anglican clergy "priests". In their minds, the word "priest" meant "someone who offers a sacrifice", and was therefore related in their minds to Catholic teaching on the Eucharist as a sacrifice. After the Reformation, the term "minister" (meaning "one who serves") was generally adopted by Puritans to describe their clergy; Puritans argued in favor of its use, or else for simply transliterating the Koine Greek word presbyter used in the New Testament, without translation.

The Puritans were also dismayed when the Laudians revived the custom of keeping Lent, which had fallen into disfavor in England after the Reformation. The Puritans preferred fast days specifically called by the church or the government in response to the problems of the day, rather than on days chosen by the ecclesiastical calendar.

== The foundation of Puritan New England, 1630–1642 ==
Some Puritans began considering founding their own colony where they could worship in a fully reformed church, far from King Charles and the bishops. This was a quite distinct view of the church from that held by the Separatists of Plymouth Colony. John Winthrop, a lawyer who had practiced in the Court of Wards, began to explore the idea of creating a Puritan colony in New England. The Pilgrims at Plymouth Colony had proved that such a colony was viable.

In 1627, the existing Dorchester Company for New England colonial expansion went bankrupt, but was succeeded by the New England Company (the membership of the Dorchester and New England Companies overlapped). Throughout 1628 and 1629, Puritans in Winthrop's social circle discussed the possibility of moving to New England. The New England Company sought clearer title to the New England land of the proposed settlement than was provided by the Sheffield Patent, and in March 1629 succeeded in obtaining from King Charles a royal charter changing the name of the company to the Governor and Company of the Massachusetts Bay in New England and granting them the land to found the Massachusetts Bay Colony. The royal charter establishing the Massachusetts Bay Company had not specified where the company's annual meeting should be held; this raised the possibility that the governor of the company could move to the new colony and serve as governor of the colony, while the general court of the company could be transformed into the colony's legislative assembly. John Winthrop participated in these discussions and in March 1629, signed the Cambridge Agreement, by which the non-emigrating shareholders of the company agreed to turn over control of the company to the emigrating shareholders. As Winthrop was the wealthiest of the emigrating shareholders, the company decided to make him governor, and entrusted him with the company charter.

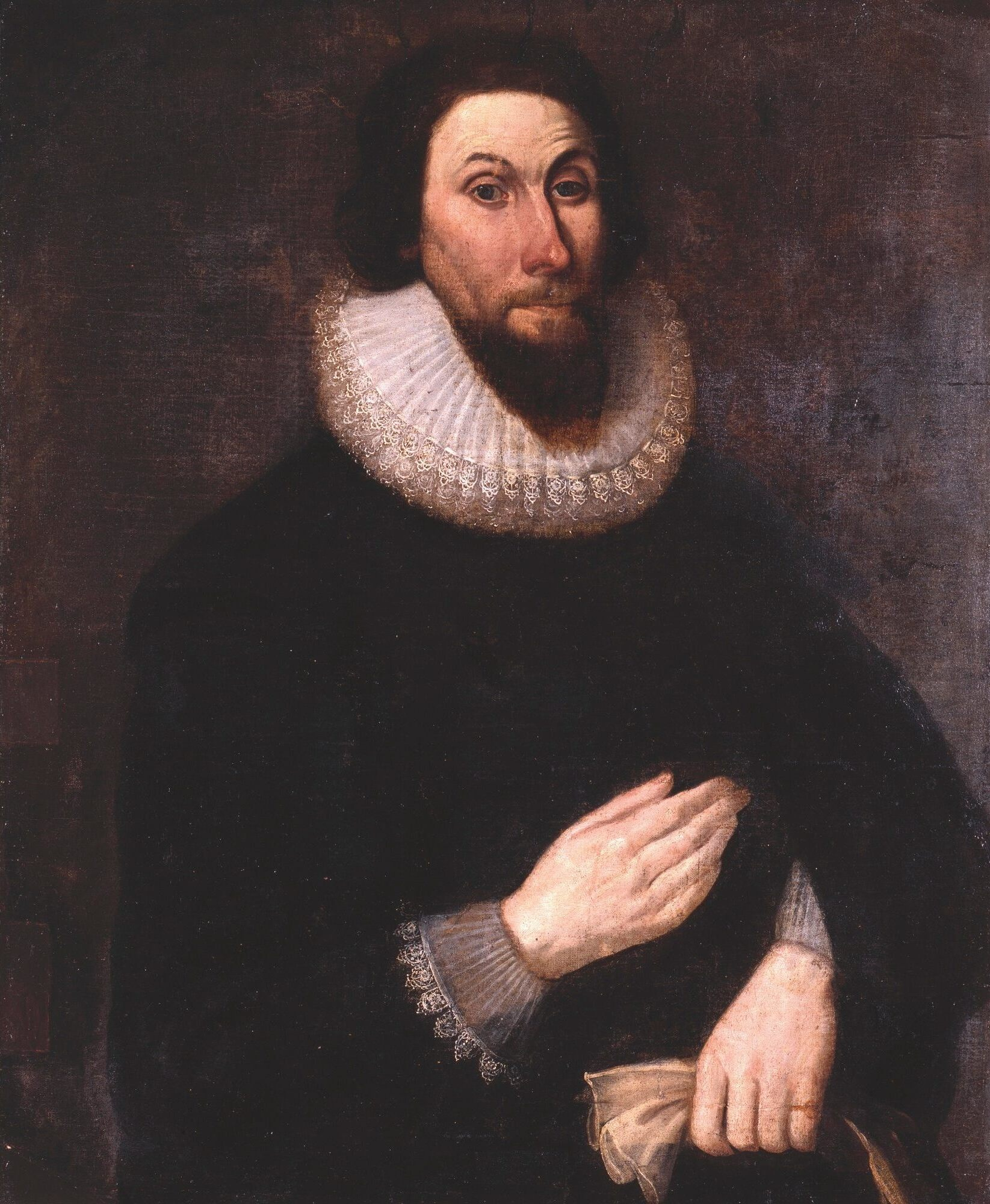
John Winthrop (1587/8–1649), Governor of the Massachusetts Bay Colony, who led the Puritans in the Great Migration, beginning in 1630.

Winthrop sailed for New England in 1630 along with 700 colonists on board eleven ships known collectively as the Winthrop Fleet. Winthrop himself sailed on board the Arbella. During the crossing, he preached a sermon entitled "A Model of Christian Charity", in which he called on his fellow settlers to make their new colony a City upon a Hill, meaning that they would be a model to all the nations of Europe as to what a properly reformed Christian commonwealth should look like. The context in 1630 was that the Thirty Years' War was going badly for the Protestants, and Catholicism was being restored in lands previously reformed – e.g. by the 1629 Edict of Restitution.

Emigration was officially restricted to conforming churchmen in December 1634 by the Privy Council.

== William Laud, Archbishop of Canterbury, 1633–1643 ==
In 1633 the moderate archbishop George Abbot died, and Charles I chose William Laud as his successor as Archbishop of Canterbury. Abbot had been in practical terms suspended from his functions in 1617 after he refused to order his clergy to read the Book of Sports. Charles now re-issued the Book of Sports, in a symbolic gesture of October 1633 against sabbatarianism. Laud further ordered his clergy to read it to their congregations, and suspended ministers who refused to do that, an effective shibboleth to root out Puritan clergy. The 1630s saw a renewed concern by bishops of the Church of England to enforce uniformity in the church, by ensuring strict compliance with the style of worship set out in the Book of Common Prayer. The Court of High Commission came to be the primary means for disciplining Puritan clergy who refused to conform. Unlike regular courts, in the Court of High Commission, there was no right against self-incrimination, and the Court could compel testimony.

Some bishops went further than the Book of Common Prayer, and required their clergy to conform to levels of extra ceremonialism. As noted above, the introduction of altar rails to churches was the most controversial such requirement. Puritans were also dismayed by the re-introduction of Christian art (e.g. stained glass windows) into churches that had been stripped bare since the iconoclasm of the Reformation.

=== Silencing of Puritan laymen ===
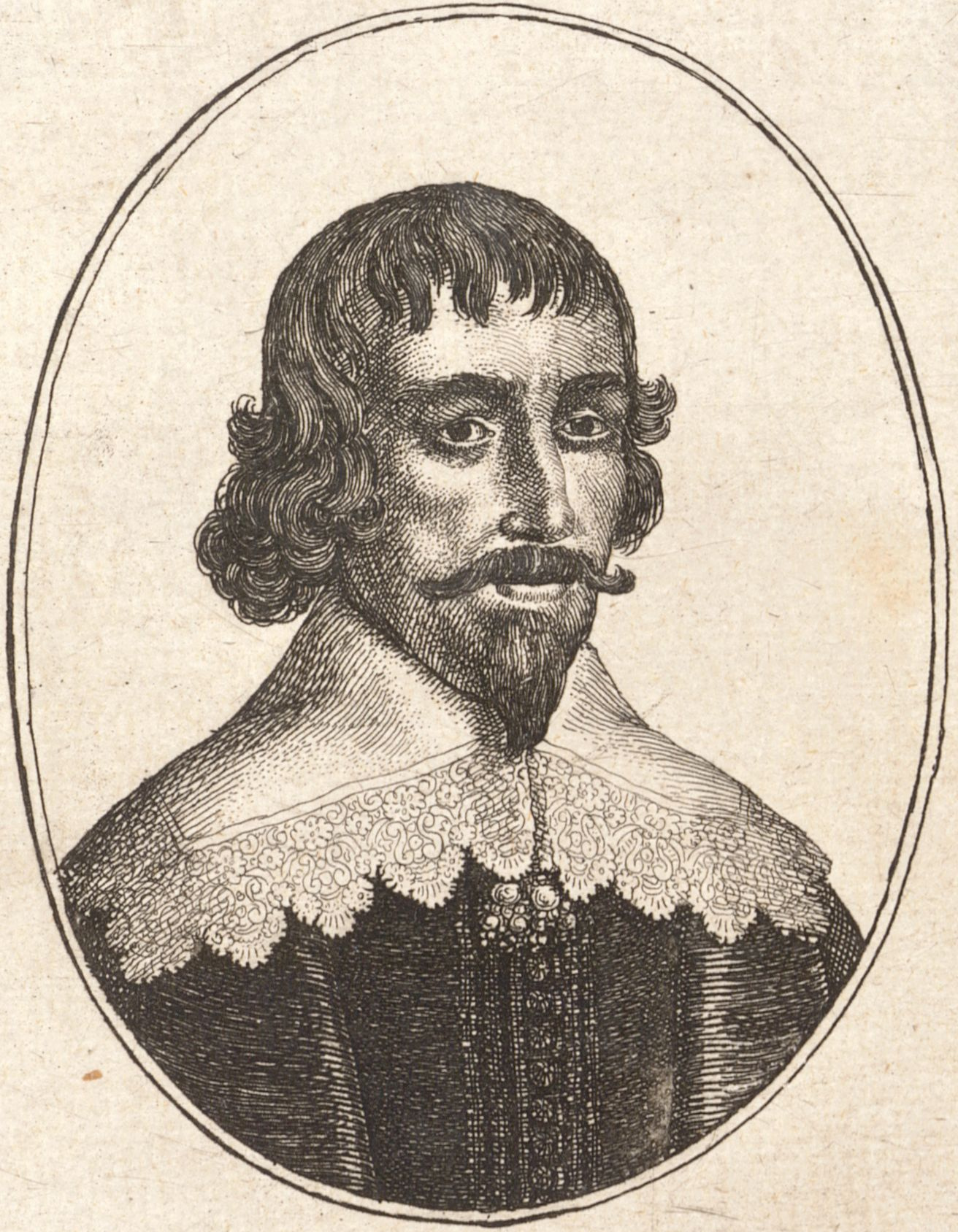
William Prynne (1600–1669), Puritan politician who opposed the policies of William Laud, Archbishop of Canterbury, and had his ears cut off as a result...

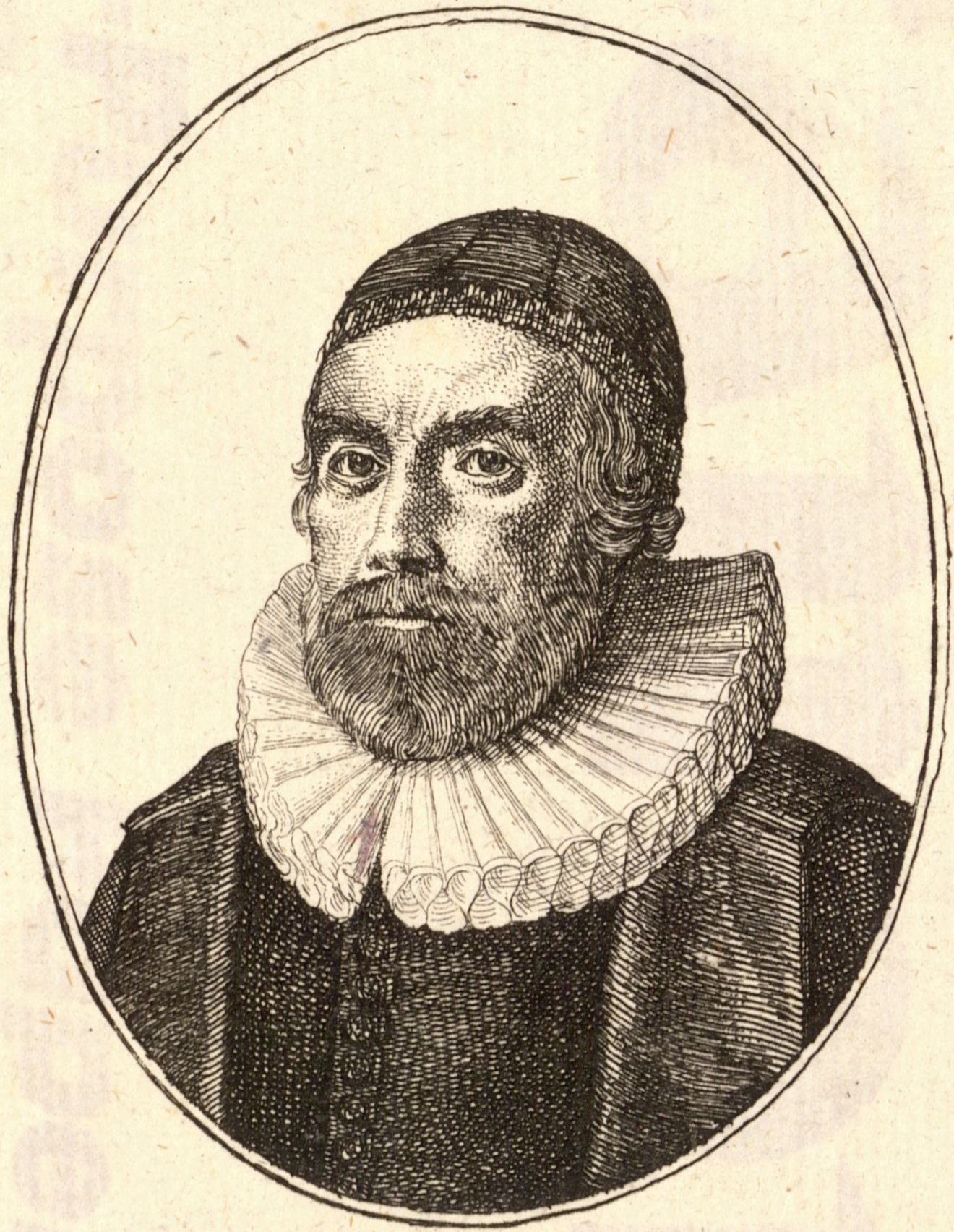
...and Henry Burton (1578–1648).

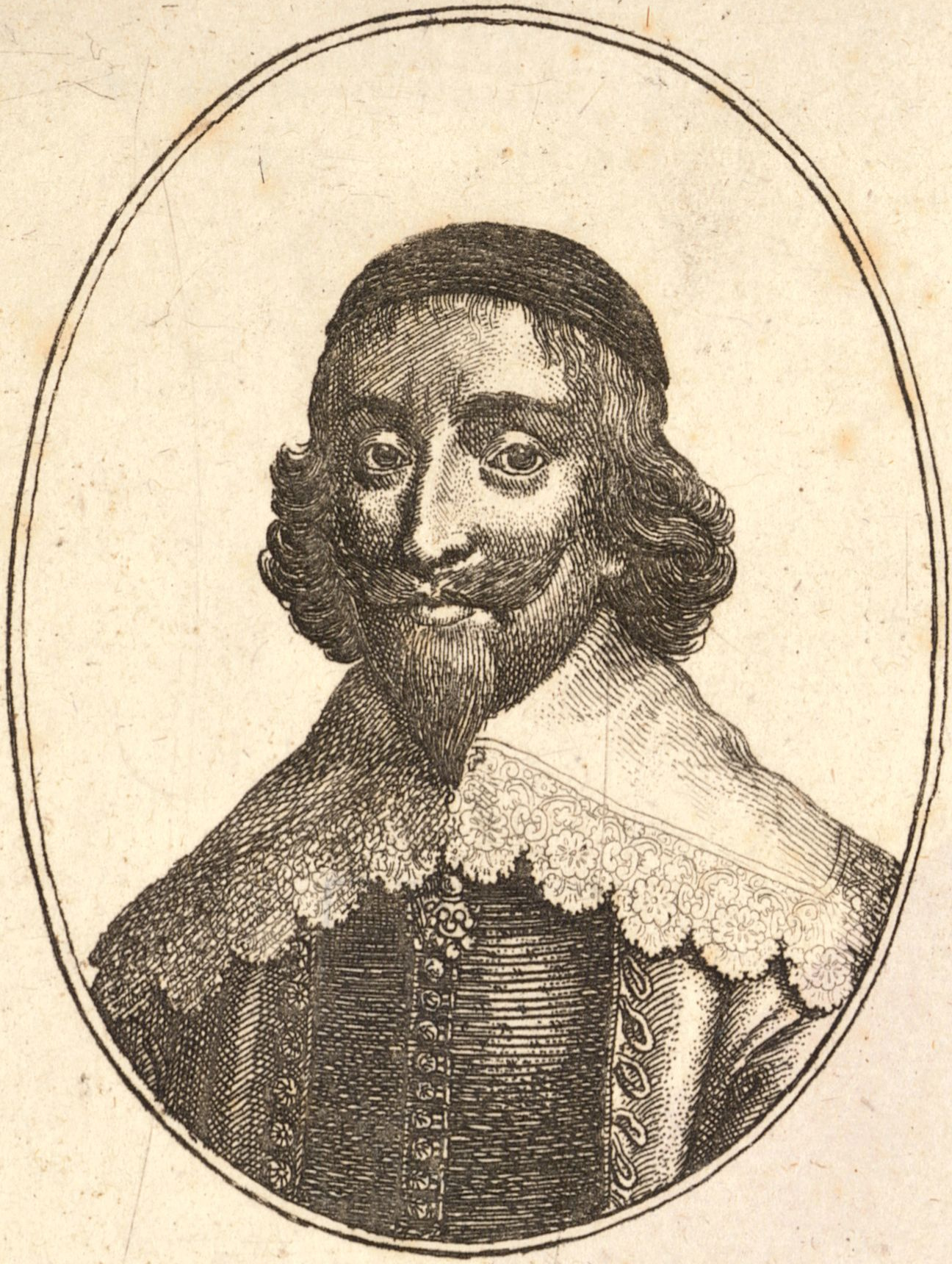
... as did John Bastwick (1593–1654)...

The ejection of non-conforming Puritan ministers from the Church of England in the 1630s provoked a reaction. Puritan laymen spoke out against King Charles's policies, with the bishops the main focus of Puritan ire. The first, and most famous, critic of both Laudianism and the Caroline divines was William Prynne. In the late 1620s and early 1630s, Prynne had authored a number of works denouncing the spread of both Arminianism and Anglo-Catholicism in the Church of England, and was also opposed to King Charles' marriage to a Catholic princess. Prynne became a vocal critic of the lax morals at court.

Prynne was also a critic of societal morals more generally. Echoing John Chrysostom's criticism of the stage, Prynne penned a book, Histriomastix, in which he denounced the stage in vehement terms for its promotion of lasciviousness. The book, which represents the highest point of the Puritans' attack on the English Renaissance theatre, attacked stage plays for allegedly promoting lewdness. Unfortunately for Prynne, his book appeared at about the same time that Henrietta Maria became the first royal to ever perform in a masque, Walter Montagu's The Shepherd's Paradise, in January 1633. Histriomastix was widely read as a Puritan attack on the queen's morality. Shortly after becoming Archbishop of Canterbury, William Laud prosecuted Prynne in the Court of Star Chamber on a charge of seditious libel. Unlike the common law courts, Star Chamber was allowed to order any punishment short of the death penalty, including torture, for crimes which were founded on equity, not on law. Seditious libel was one of the "equitable crimes" which were prosecuted in the Star Chamber. Prynne was found guilty and sentenced to imprisonment, a £5000 fine, and the removal of part of his ears.

Prynne continued to publish from prison, and in 1637, he was tried before Star Chamber a second time. This time, Star Chamber ordered that the rest of Prynne's ears be cut off, and that he should be branded with the letters S L for "seditious libeller". (Prynne would maintain that the letters really stood for stigmata Laudis (the marks of Laud).) At the same trial, Star Chamber also ordered that two other critics of the regime should have their ears cut off for writing against Laudianism: John Bastwick, a physician who wrote anti-episcopal pamphlets; and Henry Burton.

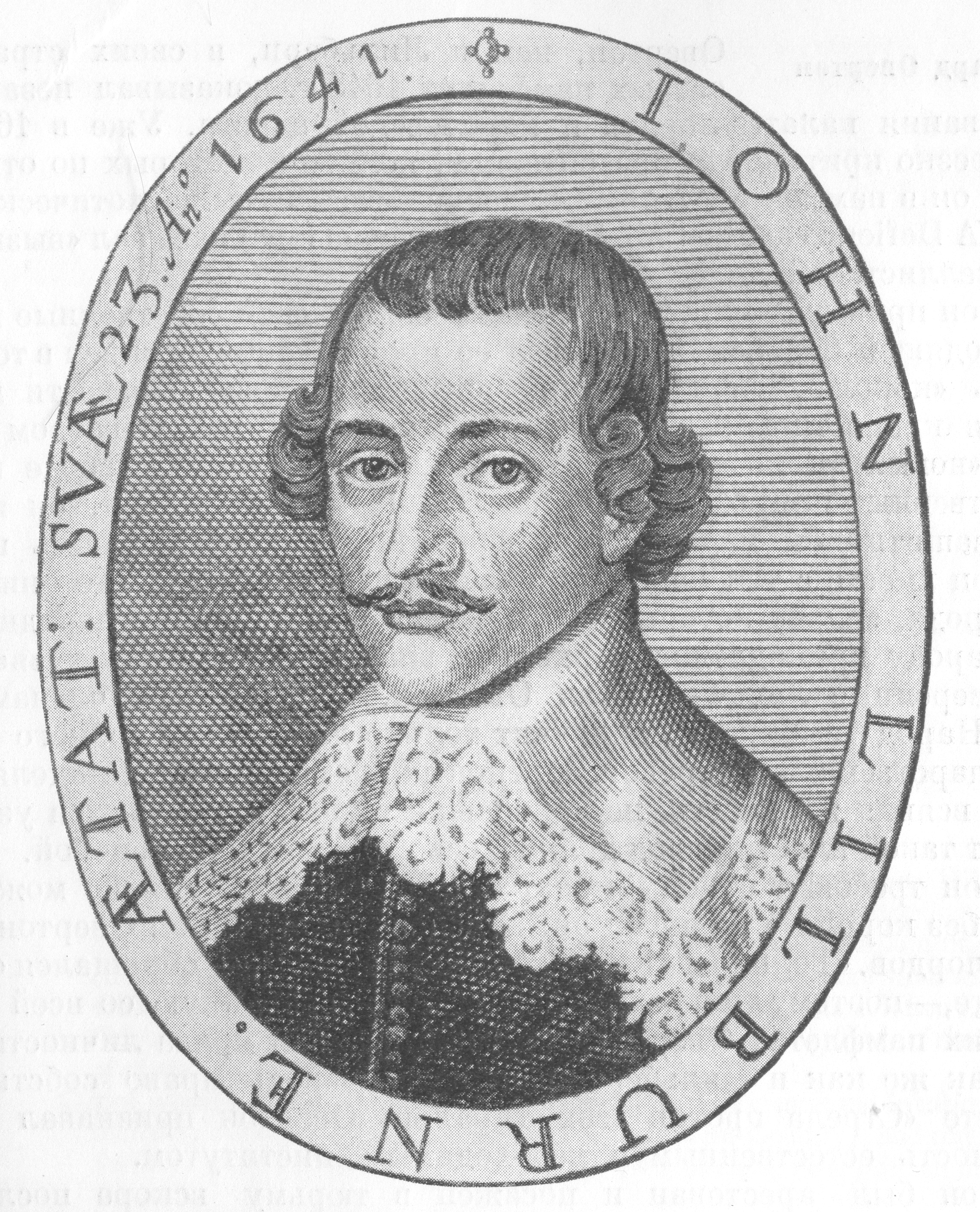
John Lilburne (1614–1657), Puritan layman who, in 1638 gained national frame as "Freeborn John" for his defense of himself when called before Star Chamber to defend his importing unlicensed publications from Amsterdam.

A year later, the trio of "martyrs" were joined by a fourth, John Lilburne, who had studied under John Bastwick. Since 1632, it had been illegal to publish or import works of literature not licensed by the Stationers' Company, and this allowed the government to view and censor any work prior to publication. Over the course of the 1630s, it became common for Puritans to have their works published in Amsterdam and then smuggled into England. In 1638, Lilburne was prosecuted in Star Chamber for importing religious works critical of Laudianism from Amsterdam. Lilburne thus began a course which would see him later hailed as "Freeborn John" and as the pre-eminent champion of "English liberties". In Star Chamber, he refused to plead to the charges against him on the grounds that the charges had been presented to him only in Latin. The court then imprisoned him and again brought him back to court and demanded a plea. Lilburne demanded to hear in English the charges brought against him. The authorities then resorted to flogging him with a three-thonged whip on his bare back, as he was dragged by his hands tied to the rear of an oxcart from Fleet Prison to the pillory at Westminster. He was then forced to stoop in the pillory where he still managed to distribute unlicensed literature to the crowds. He was then gagged. Finally he was imprisoned. He was taken back to the court and again imprisoned.

=== Suppression of the Feoffees for Impropriations ===
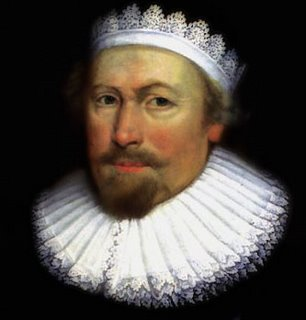
Richard Sibbes (1577–1635) served as one of the Feoffees for Impropriations, who were organized in 1625 to support Puritanism in the Church of England, and which were dissolved with their assets forfeited to the crown in 1632.

Beginning in 1625, a group of Puritan lawyers, merchants, and clergymen (including Richard Sibbes and John Davenport) organized an organization known as the Feoffees for the Purchase of Impropriations. The feoffees would raise funds to purchase lay impropriations and advowsons, which would mean that the feoffees would then have the legal right to appoint their chosen candidates to benefices and lectureships. This provided a mechanism both for increasing the number of preaching ministers in the country, and a way to ensure that Puritans could receive ecclesiastical appointments.

In 1629, Peter Heylin, a Magdalen don, preached a sermon in St Mary's denouncing the Feoffees for Impropriations for sowing tares among the wheat. As a result of the publicity, William Noy began to prosecute feoffees in the Exchequer court. The feoffees' defense was that all the men they had arranged to have appointed to office conformed to the Church of England. Nevertheless, in 1632, the Feoffees for Impropriations were dissolved and the group's assets forfeited to the crown: King Charles ordered that the money should be used to augment the salary of incumbents and used for other pious uses not controlled by the Puritans.

=== The Bishops' Wars, 1638–1640 ===
As noted above, James had tried to bring the English and Scottish churches closer together. In the process, he had restored bishops to the Church of Scotland and forced the Five Articles of Perth on the Scottish church, moves which upset Scottish Presbyterians. Charles now further angered the Presbyterians by elevating the bishops' role in Scotland even higher than his father had, to the point where in 1635, the Archbishop of St Andrews, John Spottiswoode, was made Lord Chancellor of Scotland. Presbyterian opposition to Charles reached a new height of intensity in 1637, when Charles attempted to impose a version of the Book of Common Prayer on the Church of Scotland. Although this book was drawn up by a panel of Scottish bishops, it was widely seen as an English import and denounced as Laud's Liturgy. What was worse, where the Scottish prayer book differed from the English, it seemed to be re-introducing old errors which had not yet been re-introduced in England. As a result, when the newly appointed Bishop of Edinburgh, David Lindsay, rose to read the new liturgy in St. Giles' Cathedral, Jenny Geddes, a member of the congregation, threw her stool at Lindsay, thus setting off the Prayer Book Riot.

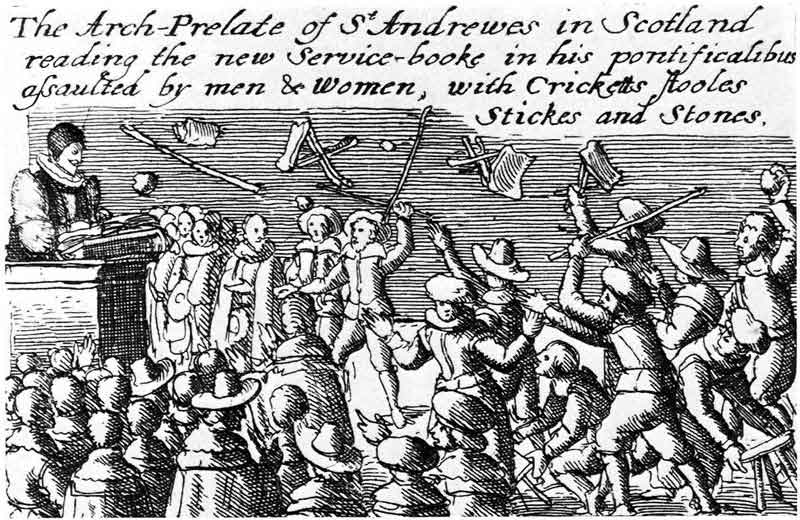
Jenny Geddes throws her stool at David Lindsay, Bishop of Edinburgh, in 1637, setting off the Prayer Book Riot which would ultimately lead to the First Bishops' War.

The Scottish prayer book was deeply unpopular with Scottish noblemen and gentry, not only on religious grounds, but also for nationalist reasons: Knox's Book of Common Order had been adopted as the liturgy of the national church by the Parliament of Scotland, whereas the Scottish parliament was not consulted in 1637 and the new prayer book imposed solely on the basis of Charles' alleged royal supremacy in the church, a doctrine which had never been accepted by either the Church or Parliament of Scotland. A number of leading noblemen drew up a document known as the National Covenant in February 1638. Those who subscribed to the National Covenant are known as Covenanters. Later that year, the General Assembly of the Church of Scotland ejected the bishops from the church.

In response to this challenge to his authority, Charles raised an army and marched on Scotland in the "First Bishops' War" (1639). The English Puritans – who had a longstanding opposition to the bishops (which had reached new heights in the wake of the Prynne, Burton, Bastwick, and Lilburne cases) – were deeply dismayed that the king was now waging a war to maintain the office of bishop. The First Bishops' War ended in a stalemate, since both sides lacked sufficient resources to defeat their opponents (in Charles' case, this was because he did not have enough revenues to wage a war since he had not called a Parliament since 1629), which led to the signing of the Treaty of Berwick (1639).

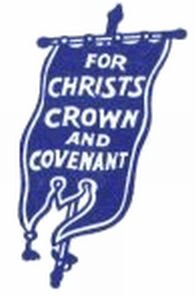
The blue banner carried into battle by the Covenanters from 1639.

Charles intended to break the Treaty of Berwick at the next opportunity, and upon returning to London, began preparations for calling a Parliament that could pass new taxes to fund a war against the Scots and to re-establish episcopacy in Scotland. This Parliament – known as the Short Parliament because it only lasted three weeks – met in 1640. Unfortunately for Charles, many Puritan members were elected to the Parliament, and two critics of royal policies, John Pym and John Hampden, emerged as loud critics of the king in the Parliament. These members insisted that Parliament had an ancient right to demand the redress of grievances and insisted that the nation's grievances with the past ten years of royal policies should be dealt with before Parliament granted Charles the taxes that he wanted. Frustrated, Charles dissolved Parliament three weeks after it opened.

In Scotland, the rebellious spirit continued to grow in strength. Following the signing of the Treaty of Berwick, the General Assembly of Scotland met in Edinburgh and confirmed the abolition of episcopacy in Scotland, and then went even further and declared that all episcopacy was contrary to the Word of God. When the Scottish Parliament met later in the year, it confirmed the Church of Scotland's position. The Scottish Covenanters now determined that Presbyterianism could never be confidently re-established in Scotland so long as episcopacy remained the order of the day in England. They therefore determined to invade England to help bring about the abolition of episcopacy. At the same time, the Scots (who had many contacts among the English Puritans) learned that the king was intending to break the Treaty of Berwick and make a second attempt at invading Scotland. When the Short Parliament was dissolved without having granted Charles the money he requested, the Covenanters determined that the time was ripe to launch a preemptive strike against English invasion. As such, in August 1640, the Scottish troops marched into northern England, beginning the "Second Bishops' War". Catching the king unaware, the Scots were victorious at the Battle of Newburn. The Scottish Covenanters thus occupied the northern counties of England and imposed a large fine of £850 a day on the king until a treaty could be signed. Believing that the king was not trustworthy, the Scottish insisted that the Parliament of England be a part of any peace negotiations. Bankrupted by the Second Bishops' War, Charles had little choice but to call a Parliament to grant new taxes to pay off the Scots. He reluctantly called a Parliament which would not be dissolved until 1660, the Long Parliament.

=== The Canons of 1640 and the Et Cetera Oath ===
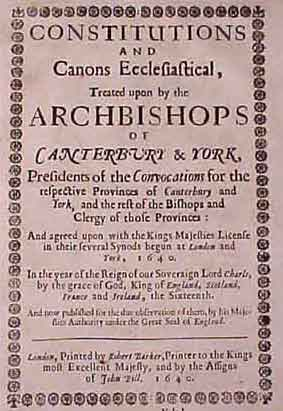
Title page of the Canons of 1640, which were passed by the Convocation of the English Clergy at the behest of King Charles and Archbishop Laud and which were detested by the Puritans.

The Convocation of the English Clergy traditionally met whenever Parliament met, and was then dissolved whenever Parliament was dissolved. In 1640, however, Charles ordered the Convocation to continue sitting even after he dissolved the Short Parliament because the Convocation had not yet passed the canons which Charles had had Archbishop Laud draw up and which confirmed the Laudian church policies as the official policies of the Church of England. The Convocation dutifully passed these canons in late May 1640.

The preamble to the canons claims that the canons are not innovating in the church, but are rather restoring ceremonies from the time of Edward VI and Elizabeth I which had fallen into disuse. The first canon asserted that the king ruled by divine right; that the doctrine of Royal Supremacy was required by divine law; and that taxes were due to the king "by the law of God, nature, and nations." This canon led many MPs to conclude that Charles and the Laudian clergy were attempting to use the Church of England as a way to establish an absolute monarchy in England, and felt that this represented unwarranted clerical interference in the recent dispute between Parliament and the king over ship money.

Canons against popery and Socinianism were uncontroversial, but the canon against the sectaries was controversial because it was aimed at the Puritans. This canon condemned anyone who did not regularly attend service in their parish church or who attended only the sermon, not the full Prayer Book service. It went on to condemn anyone who wrote books critical of the discipline and government of the Church of England.

Finally, and most controversially, the Canons imposed an oath, known to history as the Et Cetera Oath, to be taken by every clergyman, every Master of Arts not the son of a nobleman, all who had taken a degree in divinity, law, or physic, all registrars of the Consistory Court and Chancery Court, all actuaries, proctors and schoolmasters, all persons incorporated from foreign universities, and all candidates for ordination. The oath read

I, A. B., do swear that I do approve the doctrine, and discipline, or government established in the Church of England as containing all things necessary to salvation: and that I will not endeavour by myself or any other, directly or indirectly, to bring in any popish doctrine contrary to that which is so established; nor will I ever give my consent to alter the government of this Church by archbishops, bishops, deans, and archdeacons, &c., as it stands now established, and as by right it ought to stand, nor yet ever to subject it to the usurpations and superstitions of the see of Rome. And all these things I do plainly and sincerely acknowledge and swear, according to the plain and common sense and understanding of the same words, without any equivocation, or mental evasion, or secret reservation whatsoever. And this I do heartily, willingly, and truly, upon the faith of a Christian. So help me God in Jesus Christ.

The Puritans were furious. They attacked the Canons of 1640 as unconstitutional, claiming that Convocation was no longer legally in session after Parliament was dissolved. The campaign to enforce the Et Cetera Oath met with firm Puritan resistance, organized in London by Cornelius Burges, Edmund Calamy the Elder, and John Goodwin. The imposition of the Et Cetera Oath also resulted in the Puritans' pro-Scottish sympathies becoming even more widespread, and there were rumours – possible but never proven – that Puritan leaders were in treasonable communication with the Scottish during this period. Many Puritans refused to read the prayer for victory against the Scottish which they had been ordered to read.

=== The Long Parliament attacks Laudianism and considers the Root and Branch Petition, 1640–1642 ===
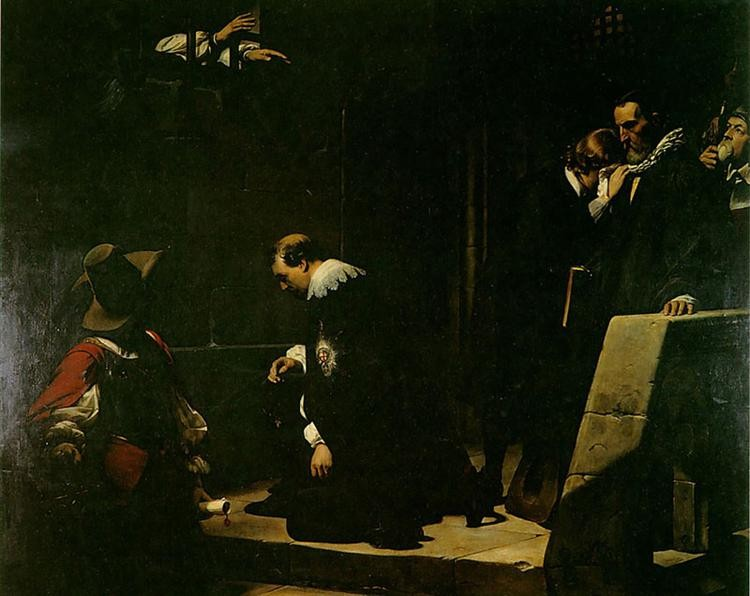
Strafford Led to Execution by Paul Delaroche, 1835. In the early days of the Long Parliament, Puritans led the charge in the impeachment of both Archbishop Laud and Thomas Wentworth, 1st Earl of Strafford. This 19th-century painting by Paul Delaroche shows Laud reaching his hands from his cell in the Tower of London to offer Strafford a blessing shortly before Strafford's execution in May 1641. Laud would subsequently be executed in 1645.

The elections to the Long Parliament in November 1640 produced a Parliament which was even more dominated by Puritans than the Short Parliament had been. Parliament's first order of business was therefore to move against Thomas Wentworth, 1st Earl of Strafford, who had served as Charles' Lord Deputy of Ireland since 1632. In the wake of the Second Bishops' War, Strafford had been raising an Irish Catholic army in Ireland which could be deployed against the Scottish Covenanters. Puritans were appalled that an army of Irish Catholics (whom they hated) would be deployed by the crown against the Scottish Presbyterians (whom they loved), and many English Protestants who were not particularly puritanical shared the sentiment. Having learned that Parliament intended to impeach him, Strafford presented the king with evidence of treasonable communications between Puritans in Parliament and the Scottish Covenanters. Nevertheless, through deft political manoeuvering, John Pym, along with Oliver St John and Lord Saye, managed to quickly have Parliament impeach Strafford on charges of high treason and Strafford was arrested.

At his trial before the House of Lords, begun in January 1641, prosecutors argued that Strafford intended to use the Irish Catholic army against English Protestants. Strafford responded that the army was intended to be used against the rebellious Scots. Strafford was ultimately acquitted in April 1641 on the grounds that his actions did not amount to high treason. As a result, Puritan opponents of Strafford launched a bill of attainder against Strafford in the House of Commons; in the wake of a revolt by the army, which had not been paid in months, the House of Lords also passed the bill of attainder. Charles, worried that the army would revolt further if they were not paid, that the army would never be paid until Parliament granted funds, and that Parliament would not grant funds without Strafford's death, signed the bill of attainder in May 1641. Strafford was executed before a crowd of 200,000 on 12 May 1641.

The Puritans took advantage of Parliament's and the public's mood and organized the Root and Branch Petition, so called because it called for the abolition of episcopacy "root and branch". The Root and Branch Petition signed by 15,000 Londoners was presented to Parliament by a crowd of 1,500 on 11 December 1640. The Root and Branch Petition detailed many of the Puritans' grievances with Charles and the bishops. It complained that the bishops had silenced many godly ministers and made ministers afraid to instruct the people about "the doctrine of predestination, of free grace, of perseverance, of original sin remaining after baptism, of the sabbath, the doctrine against universal grace, election for faith foreseen, freewill against Antichrist, non-residents (ministers who did not live in their parishes), human inventions in God's worship". The Petition condemned the practices of bestowing temporal power on bishops and encouraging ministers to disregard temporal authority. The Petition condemned the regime for suppressing godly books while allowing the publication of popish, Arminian, and lewd books (such as Ovid's Ars Amatoria and the ballads of Martin Parker). The Petition also restated several of the Puritans' routine complaints: the Book of Sports, the placing of communion tables altar-wise, church beautification schemes, the imposing of oaths, the influence of Catholics and Arminians at court, and the abuse of excommunication by the bishops.

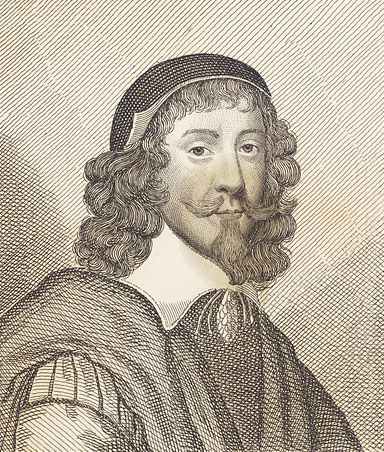
Oliver St John (c. 1598–1673), who drew up the Root and Branch Bill, which would have finally abolished episcopacy. The bill was introduced in Parliament by Henry Vane the Younger and Oliver Cromwell in May 1641, and defeated in August 1641.

In December 1640, the month after it impeached Strafford, Parliament had also impeached Archbishop Laud on charges of high treason. He was accused of subverting true religion, assuming pope-like powers, attempting to reconcile the Church of England with the Roman Catholic Church, persecuting godly preachers, ruining the Church of England's relations with the Reformed churches on the Continent, promoting the war with Scotland, and a variety of other offenses. During this debate, Harbottle Grimston famously called Laud "the roote and ground of all our miseries and calamities...the sty of all pestilential filth that hath infected the State and Government." Unlike Strafford, however, Laud's enemies did not move quickly to secure his execution. He was imprisoned in the Tower of London in February 1641.

In March 1641, the House of Commons passed the Bishops Exclusion Bill, which would have prevented the bishops from taking their seats in the House of Lords. The House of Lords, however, rejected this bill.

In May 1641, Henry Vane the Younger and Oliver Cromwell introduced the Root and Branch Bill, which had been drafted by Oliver St John and which was designed to root out episcopacy in England "root and branch" along the lines advocated in the Root and Branch Petition. Many moderate MPs, such as Lucius Cary, 2nd Viscount Falkland and Edward Hyde, were dismayed: although they believed that Charles and Laud had gone too far in the 1630s, they were not prepared to abolish episcopacy. The debate over the Root and Branch Bill was intense – the Bill was finally rejected in August 1641. The division of MPs over this bill would form the basic division of MPs in the subsequent war, with those who favoured the Root and Branch Bill becoming Roundheads and those who defended the bishops becoming Cavaliers.

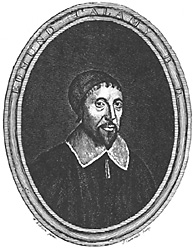
Edmund Calamy the Elder (1600–1666), the "E.C." in Smectymnuus, a group of Puritans who wrote in response to Bishop Hall's defense of episcopacy in 1641.

Unsurprisingly the debate surrounding the Root and Branch Bill occasioned a lively pamphlet controversy. Joseph Hall, the Bishop of Exeter, wrote a spirited defense of episcopacy entitled An Humble Remonstrance to the High Court of Parliament. This drew forth a response from five Puritan authors, who wrote under the name Smectymnuus, an acronym based on their names (Stephen Marshall, Edmund Calamy, Thomas Young, Matthew Newcomen, and William Spurstow). Smectymnuus's first pamphlet, An Answer to a booke entituled, An Humble Remonstrance. In Which, the Original of Liturgy and Episcopacy is Discussed, was published in March 1641. It is believed that one of Thomas Young's former students, John Milton, wrote the postscript to the reply. (Milton published several anti-episcopal pamphlets in 1640–1641). A prolonged series of answers and counter-answers followed.

Worried that the king would again quickly dissolve Parliament without redressing the nation's grievances, John Pym pushed through an Act against Dissolving Parliament without its own Consent; desperately in need of money, Charles had little choice but to consent to the Act. The Long Parliament then sought to undo the more unpopular aspects of the past eleven years. Star Chamber, which had been used to silence Puritan laymen, was abolished in July 1641. The Court of High Commission was also abolished at this time. Parliament ordered Prynne, Burton, Bastwick, and Lilburne released from prison, and they returned to London in triumph.

In October 1641, Irish Catholic gentry launched the Irish Rebellion of 1641, throwing off English domination and creating Confederate Ireland. English parliamentarians were terrified that an Irish army might rise to massacre English Protestants. In this atmosphere, in November 1641, Parliament passed the Grand Remonstrance, detailing over 200 points which Parliament felt that the king had acted illegally in the course of the Personal Rule. The Grand Remonstrance marked a second moment at which a number of the more moderate, non-Puritan members of Parliament (e.g. Viscount Falkland and Edward Hyde) felt that Parliament had gone too far in its denunciations of the king and was showing too much sympathy for the rebellious Scots.

When the bishops attempted to take their seats in the House of Lords in late 1641, a pro-Puritan, anti-episcopal mob, probably organized by John Pym, prevented them from doing so. The Bishops Exclusion Bill was re-introduced in December 1641, and this time, the mood of the country was such that neither the House of Lords nor Charles felt strong enough to reject the bill. The Bishops Exclusion Act prevented those in holy orders from exercising any temporal jurisdiction or authority after 5 February 1642; this extended to taking a seat in Parliament or membership of the Privy Council. Any acts carried out with such authority after that date by a member of the clergy were to be considered void.

In this period, Charles became increasingly convinced that a number of Puritan-influenced members of Parliament had treasonously encouraged the Scottish Covenanters to invade England in 1640, leading to the Second Bishops' War. As such, when he heard that they were planning to impeach the Queen for participation in Catholic plots, he determined to arrest Lord Mandeville as well as five MPs, now known as the Five Members: John Pym, John Hampden, Denzil Holles, Sir Arthur Haselrig, and William Strode. Charles famously entered the House of Commons personally on 4 January 1642, but the members had already fled.

Following his failed attempt to arrest the Five Members, Charles realized that he was not only unpopular among parliamentarians, he was also in danger from London's pro-Puritan, anti-episcopal, and increasingly anti-royal mob. As such, he and his family retreated to Oxford and invited all loyal parliamentarians to join him. He began raising an army under George Goring, Lord Goring.

Parliament passed a Militia Ordinance which raised a militia, but provided that the militia should be controlled by Parliament. The king refused to sign this bill. A major split between Parliament and the king occurred on 15 March 1642, when Parliament declared that "the People are bound by the Ordinance for the Militia, though it has not received the Royal Assent", the first time a Parliament had declared its acts to operate without receiving royal assent. Under these circumstances, the political nation began to divide itself into Roundheads and Cavaliers. The first clash between the royalists and the parliamentarians came in the April 1642 Siege of Hull, which began when the military governor appointed by Parliament, Sir John Hotham refused to allow Charles' forces access to military material in Kingston upon Hull. In August, the king officially raised his standard at Nottingham and the First English Civil War was underway.

== The Westminster Assembly, 1643–1649 ==
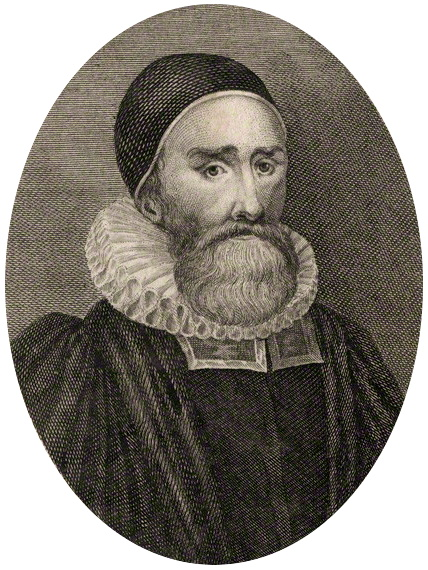
William Twisse (1578–1646), who was elected as the first Prolocutor of the Westminster Assembly in 1643, and who held that position until his death.

In 1642, the most ardent defenders of episcopacy in the Long Parliament left to join King Charles on the battlefield. However, although Civil War was beginning, Parliament was initially reluctant to pass legislation without it receiving royal assent. Thus, between June 1642 and May 1643, Parliament passed legislation providing for a religious assembly five times, but these bills did not receive royal assent and thus died. By June 1643, however, Parliament was willing to defy the king and call a religious assembly without the king's assent. This assembly, the Westminster Assembly, had its first meeting in the Henry VII Chapel of Westminster Abbey on 1 July 1643. (In later sessions, the Assembly would meet in the Jerusalem Chamber.)

The Assembly was charged with drawing up a new liturgy to replace the Book of Common Prayer and with determining what manner of church polity was appropriate for the Church of England. In both cases, it was assumed that the Westminster Assembly would only make recommendations and that Parliament would have the final word.

The Long Parliament appointed 121 divines to the Westminster Assembly (at the time "divine", i.e. theologian, was used as a synonym for "clergyman"). Of these, approximately 25 never attended – mainly because King Charles ordered all loyal subjects not to participate in the Assembly. To replace the divines who did not attend, Parliament later added 21 additional divines, known as the "Superadded Divines". The Assembly also included 30 lay assessors (10 nobles and 20 commoners). Although the Westminster Divines were mainly Puritan, they were broadly representative of all positions (except Laudianism) then on offer in the Church of England.

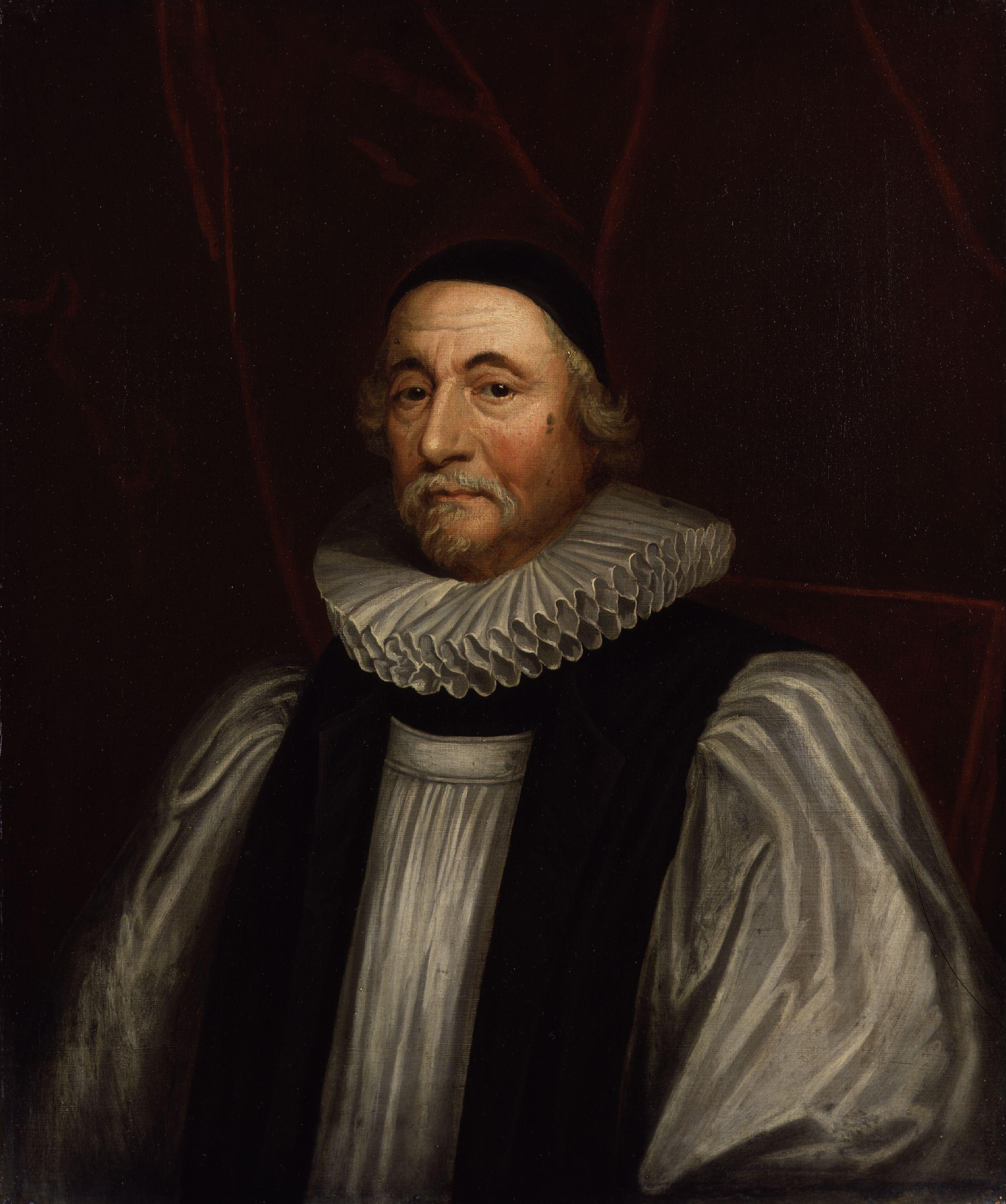
James Ussher (1581–1656), Archbishop of Armagh, who pushed for a moderate form of episcopacy at the Westminster Assembly.

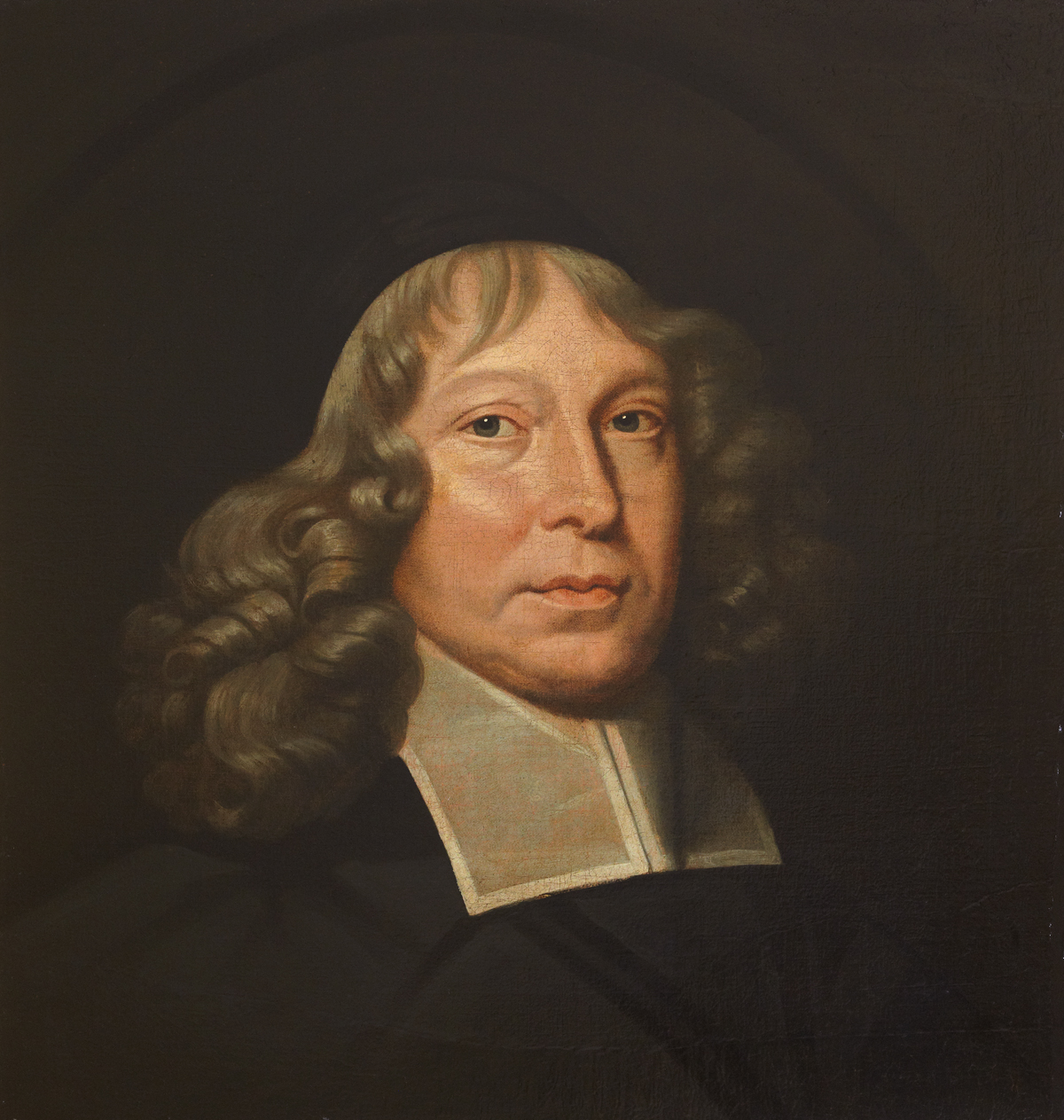
Samuel Rutherford (c. 1600–1661), Scottish Commissioner to the Westminster Assembly, who played a crucial role in ensuring that the Assembly ultimately came out in favour of presbyterianism.

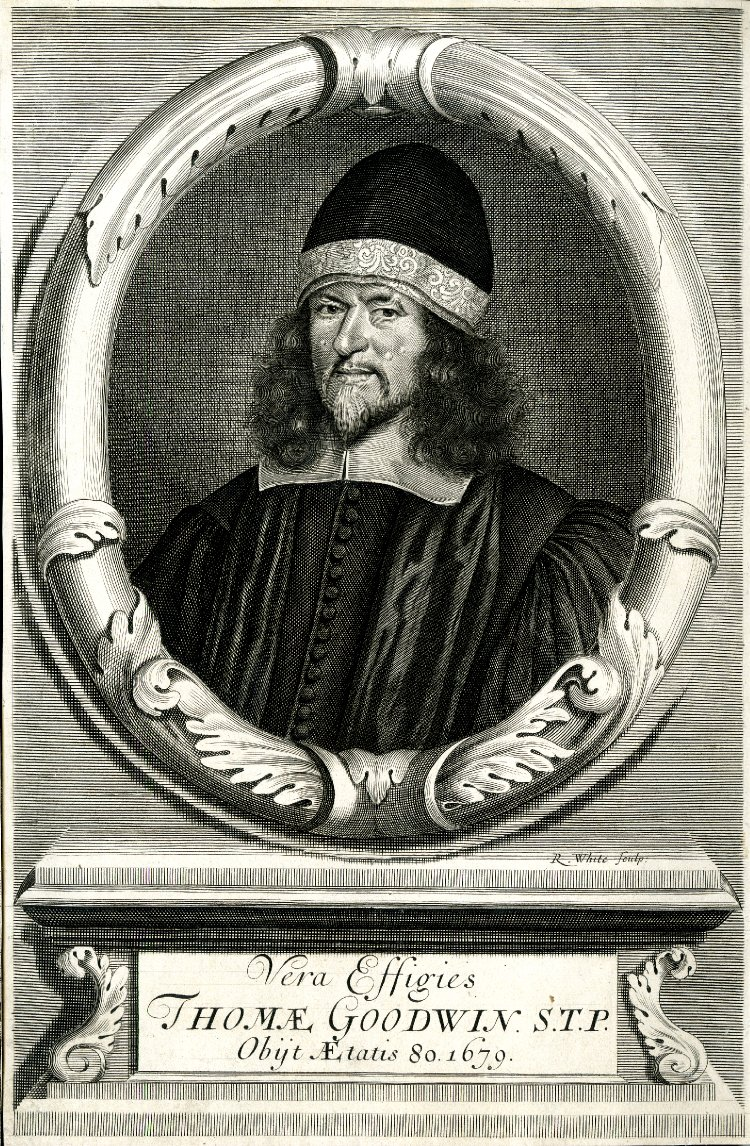
Thomas Goodwin (1600–1680), one of the "Five Dissenting Brethren" and a leader of the Independents in the Westminster Assembly.

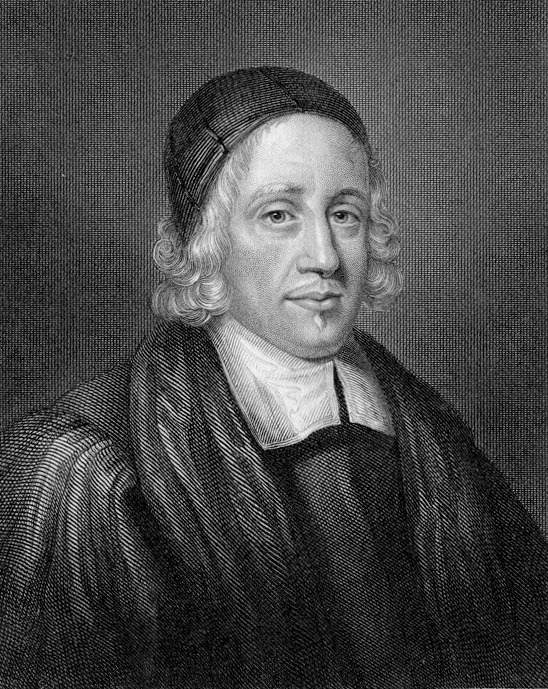
John Lightfoot (1602–1675) believed that ecclesiastical polity was not a matter of a divine law and that the church should be subordinate to the state, a position known as Erastianism at the Westminster Assembly.

For its first ten weeks, the Westminster Assembly's only task was to revise the Thirty-Nine Articles. However, in summer 1643, shortly after the calling of the Westminster Assembly, the Parliamentary forces, under the leadership of John Pym and Henry Vane the Younger concluded an agreement with the Scots known as the Solemn League and Covenant. As noted above, one of the main reasons the Scots had launched the Second Bishops War in 1640 was because they hoped to bring about an end to episcopacy in England. They therefore insisted as a term of the agreement that the English agree to fight to extirpate "popery and prelacy". Since the Puritans were also interested in fighting these things, they readily agreed, and the Long Parliament agreed to swear to the Scottish National Covenant. Six Commissioners representing the Church of Scotland were then sent to attend the Westminster Assembly. On 12 October 1643, the Long Parliament ordered the Assembly to "confer and treat among themselves of such a discipline and government as may be most agreeable to God's holy word, and most apt to procure and preserve the peace of the church at home, and nearer agreement with the Church of Scotland and other Reformed Churches abroad."

=== Parties at the Westminster Assembly ===
The Westminster Assembly's discussions on church polity mark a definitive turning point in Puritan history. Whereas Puritans had hitherto been united in their opposition to royal and episcopal ecclesiastical policies, they now became divided over the reforms to the Church of England. The Westminster Divines divided into four groups:

1. The Episcopalians, who supported a moderate form of episcopal polity and who were led by James Ussher, Archbishop of Armagh;
2. The Presbyterians, who favoured presbyterian polity – this position was pushed hard by the Scottish Commissioners, especially George Gillespie and Samuel Rutherford, while the most influential Englishman taking this position was probably Edward Reynolds;
3. The Independents, who favoured congregationalist polity and who were led by Thomas Goodwin; and
4. The Erastians, who believed that ecclesiastical polity was adiaphora, a matter indifferent, which ought to be determined by the state, and who were led by John Lightfoot.

Many issues divided the groups from each other:

- The matter of ecclesiastical polity jure divino (established by divine law) versus adiaphora (a matter indifferent, with each national church free to establish its own polity): The Erastians were the most vocal party in arguing that polity was not fixed by divine law, while the other groups were more likely to believe that their positions were dictated by the Scriptures.
- The amount of hierarchy proper in the church: The Episcopalians believed that the church should be hierarchically organized, with the bishops providing a supervisory role over other clergy. The Presbyterians believed that the church should be organized hierarchically only in the sense that the church should be governed by a series of hierarchically ordered assemblies (Sessions, Presbyteries, Synods, and at the top the General Assembly). While the Presbyterian scheme involved hierarchical ordering in the church, its proponents stressed that it did not involve a hierarchical ordering among individuals in the church, since at each level, the governing body represented the church as a whole. The Independents opposed all forms of hierarchy in the church and argued that ministers should be accountable only to their own local congregations.
- The proper relationship of church and state: All parties at the Westminster Assembly rejected what was held to be the "papist" position, that church and state should be unified, but with the state subordinate to the church. The Erastians and many of the Episcopalian party maintained that church and state should be unified, but with the church subordinate to the state, a position traditionally known as caesaropapism (and expressed, for example, in the doctrine of the royal supremacy). The Presbyterians argued for complete separation of church and state, but nevertheless felt that the state should enforce religious uniformity in the country. The Independents went furthest of all, arguing that there should be not only separation of church and state, but also religious liberty.
- The uniformity of the church's liturgy: Those inclined to episcopalianism were most inclined to favour a liturgy similar to the Book of Common Prayer, revised to make it acceptable to more extreme Puritans, but containing set forms of prayers that would be used uniformly throughout the country. Those inclined to presbyterianism were more likely to favour something akin to Knox's Book of Discipline, which set out the general form of worship, but which left individual ministers free to compose their own prayers, and even to offer extemporaneous prayer. The Independents were more likely to oppose all set forms of worship, accepted local variation in the form of worship, and felt that almost all prayer should be extemporaneous, offered spontaneously by the minister as he was moved by the Holy Spirit at the time of service.

=== The Independents Controversy, 1644 ===
Even after the Royalists failed to attend the Westminster Assembly, the Episcopalians were probably in the majority or at least the plurality. However, the Episcopalian members of the Assembly proved less than zealous in their defense of episcopacy: when the Assembly scheduled debates and votes for the late afternoon and early evening, the Episcopalian members failed to attend, allowing the Presbyterians and Independents to dominate the Assembly's debates. In a famous bon mot, Lord Falkland observed that "those that hated the bishops hated them worse than the devil and those that loved them loved them not so well as their dinner."

Upon their arrival, the Scottish Commissioners – Alexander Henderson, George Gillespie, Samuel Rutherford, and Robert Baillie – organized a campaign to have the Church of England adopt a presbyterian system similar to the Church of Scotland. It initially appeared that the Scottish Commissioners might be able to push through their presbyterian scheme with minimal resistance.

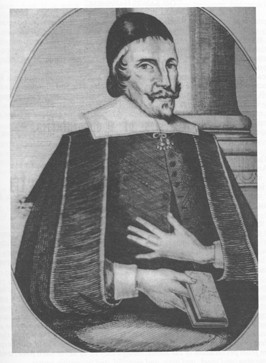
Jeremiah Burroughs (c. 1600–1646), one of the Five Dissenting Brethren who supported the Independent position at the Westminster Assembly.

However, in February 1644, five members of the Assembly – known to history as the Five Dissenting Brethren – published a pamphlet entitled "An Apologetical Narration, humbly submitted to the Honorable Houses of Parliament, by Thomas Goodwin, Philip Nye, Sidrach Simpson, Jeremiah Burroughs, & William Bridge." This publication laid out the case for the Independent position forcefully, and made it impossible for the Scottish Commissioners to succeed in quickly creating an amicable consensus around the presbyterian position. Instead, in 1644, the Westminster Assembly became the site of heated debate between the Presbyterians and the Independents.

The Independents were the party most committed to experimental predestinarianism, the position that one can have assurance of election in this life. Experimental predestinarians tended to undergo dramatic conversion experiences. With the rise of experimental predestinarianism, there was a concomitant call among some of the godly for gathered churches. Unlike the Church of England – which theoretically encompassed everybody in England – a gathered church was made up only of those who had undergone a conversion experience. Following the suppression of Separatism in the late Elizabethan period, calls for gathered churches could only be whispered about. However, the social process of separating "the godly" from the rest of the congregation continued throughout the early seventeenth century.

When the Puritans in New England set up their own congregations, in order to be admitted to the church, one had to be examined by the elders of the church, and then make a public profession of faith before the assembled congregation before being admitted to membership. The Independents supported the New England way and argued for its adoption in England. The result would be a situation where not all English people would be members of the church, but only those who had undergone a conversion experience and made a public confession of faith. Under these circumstances, one of the major reasons why the Independents favored congregational polity was that they argued that only other godly members of the congregation could identify who else was elect. The Independents condemned the suppression of the Separatists – on the basis that the state should not suppress the godly. They accused the Presbyterian party of wanting to continue the barbarous, "popish" persecutions of the Laudian bishops. For the first time, the Independents began to advocate a theory of religious liberty. Since they saw only a small minority of the community as actually "saved", they argued that it made no sense to have a uniform national church. Rather, each gathered church should be free to organize itself as it saw fit. They were therefore opposed not only to the Book of Common Prayer, but also to any attempt to reform the liturgy – they argued that in fact there should not be a national liturgy, but that each minister and each congregation should be free to worship God in the way they saw fit.

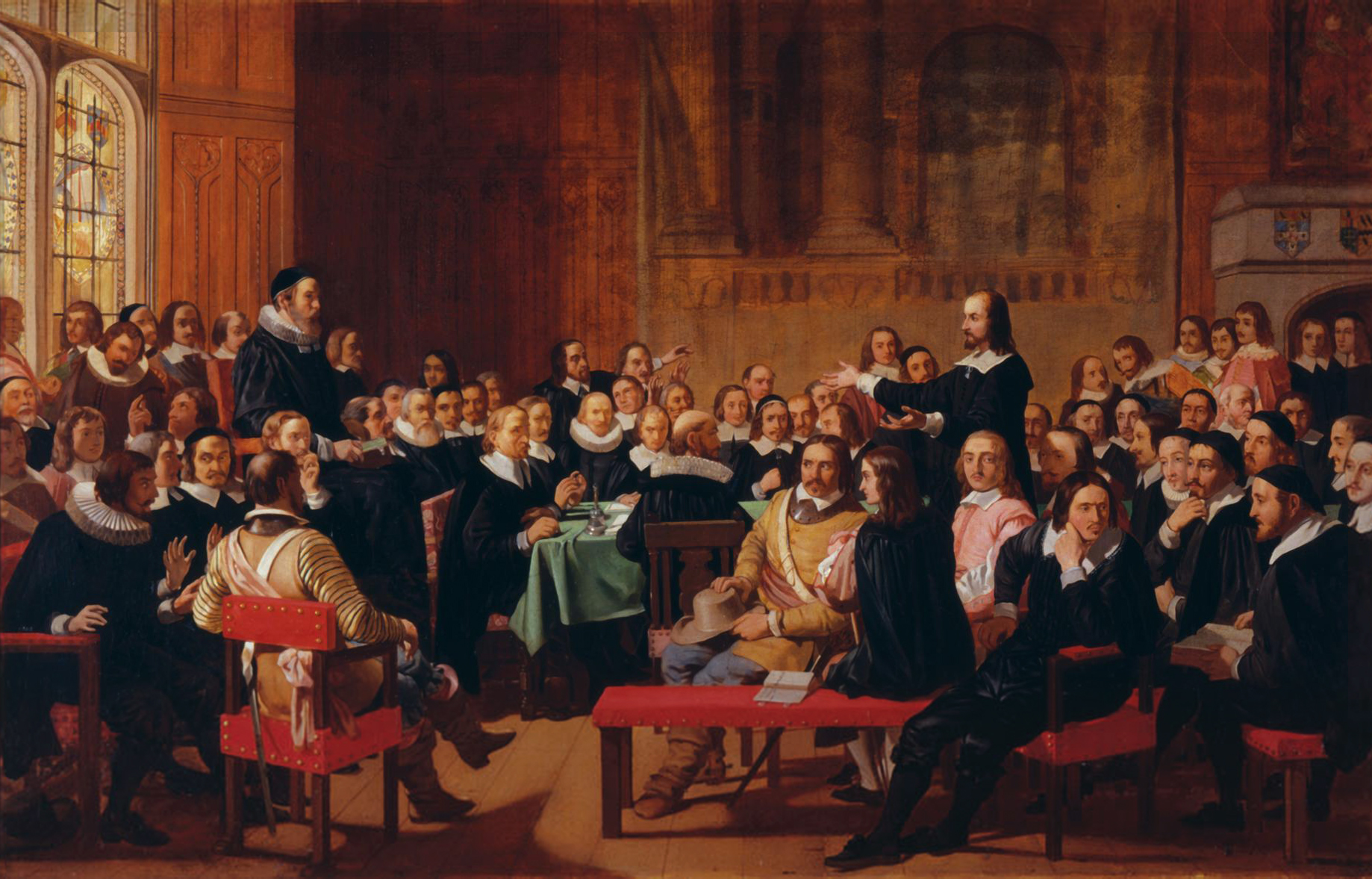
"The Assertion of Liberty of Conscience By the Independents at the Westminster Assembly of Divines" by John Rogers Herbert (1810–1890).

The Presbyterians responded that the Independents were engaged in faction. The Presbyterians were Calvinists, like the Independents, but they understood the implications of predestination differently than the Independents. Some argued that England was an elect nation, that divine providence had chosen England as a specially called nation, as God had chosen the Israelites to be a chosen people in the Old Testament. Others argued that, while it is true that God has chosen some as elect and some as reprobate, it is impossible in this life for any individual to know whether he or she was among the elect, and that life should therefore be lived in as close of conformity to the will of God as possible. They did not approve of the Independents who thought that they were the only members of the elect in England: true, many members of the Church of England may have engaged in open and notorious sins, but for the Presbyterians, that was a sign that the state needed to step in to punish those sins, lest God visit punishments on the nation in the same way that He visited punishments on Old Testament Israel when He found them sinning.

The Independent position was in the minority at the Westminster Assembly – there were only Five Dissenting Brethren in an Assembly of roughly 120 divines – making it impossible for the Independents in the Assembly to get their position passed.

=== The Erastian Controversy, 1645–1646 ===
During the next two years, a second controversy occupied time and attention of the Westminster Assembly: the controversy over Erastianism. The issue of the proper relationship of church and state – which was a part of the Independents Controversy – was at the heart of the Erastian Controversy.

During the Elizabethan Religious Settlement, two Acts of Parliament had established the place of the Church of England in English life (1) the Act of Supremacy, which declared the monarch to be the Supreme Governor of the Church of England and which imposed an oath on all subjects requiring them to swear that they recognized the royal supremacy in the church; and (2) the Act of Uniformity, which established religious uniformity throughout the country by requiring all churches to conduct services according to the Book of Common Prayer.

The events of the 1640s caused the English legal community to worry that the Westminster Assembly was preparing to illegally alter the church in a way that overrode the Act of Supremacy. As such, John Selden, arguably the foremost jurist in England since the death of Edward Coke in 1634, led a campaign against altering the Church of England in a way that would undermine the Act of Supremacy. Thus, just as the Presbyterian party in the Assembly was dominated by non-members (the Scottish Commissioners), the Erastian party was dominated by Selden and the other lawyers. Selden argued that not only English law, but the Bible itself required that the church be subordinate to the state: he cited the relationship of Zadok to King David and Romans 13 in support of this view.

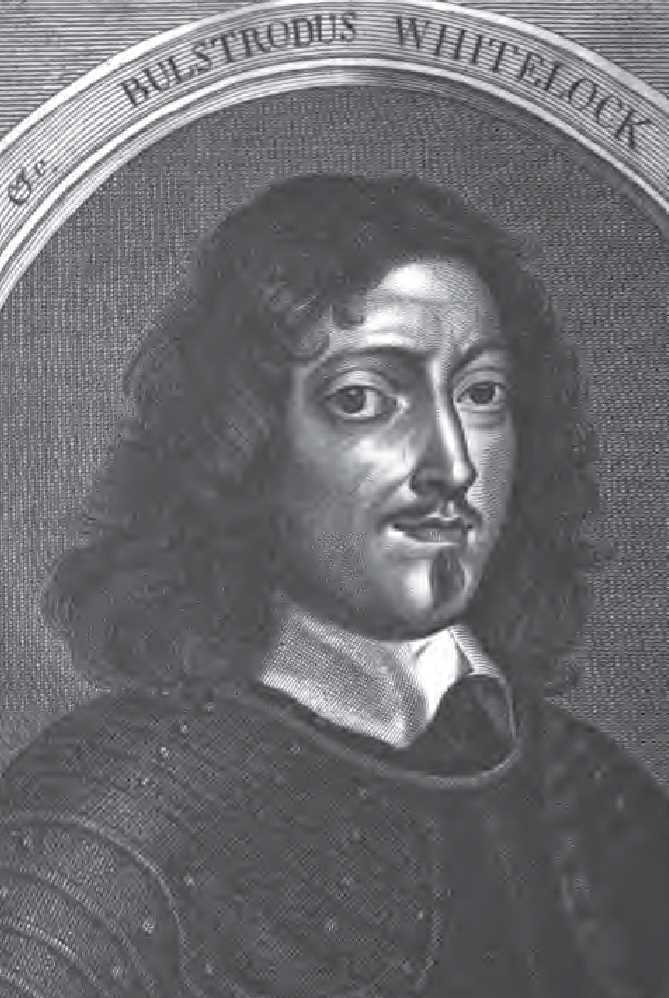
Bulstrode Whitelocke (1605–1675), MP who attended the Westminster Assembly as a lay assessor and who played a crucial role in ensuring that when the Long Parliament adopted presbyterianism for the Church of England, it did so in an Erastian way.

Beginning in April 1645, the Assembly shifted its attention from the Independents Controversy to the Erastian Controversy. Besides John Lightfoot, the most zealous proponent of the Erastian position was Bulstrode Whitelocke, one of the MPs serving as a lay assessor to the Assembly. Whitelock maintained that only the state – and not the church – could lawfully exercise the power of excommunication.

In October 1645, the Scottish Commissioners succeeded when the Long Parliament voted in favour of an ordinance erecting a presbyterian form of church government in England. However, they were appalled that the Parliament also adopted the Erastian argument and made any final decision of the church on the question of excommunication appealable from the General Assembly to the Parliament of England.

This decision provoked protests from the Presbyterian party. The Parliament of Scotland, worried that the Long Parliament was failing to live up to its commitments under the Solemn League and Covenant, protested the Erastian nature of the ordinance. The ministers of London organized a petition to the Parliament. The Westminster Assembly responded by sending a delegation, led by Stephen Marshall, a fiery preacher who had delivered several sermons to the Long Parliament, to protest the Erastian nature of the ordinance. (Some MPs argued that the Assembly by this action committed a praemunire and should be punished.) Parliament responded by sending a delegation which included Nathaniel Fiennes to the Westminster Assembly, along with a list of interrogatories related to the jure divino nature of church government. The Assembly responded by flatly rejecting the Erastian position – with John Lightfoot and Thomas Coleman being the lone members speaking in favour of Erastianism.

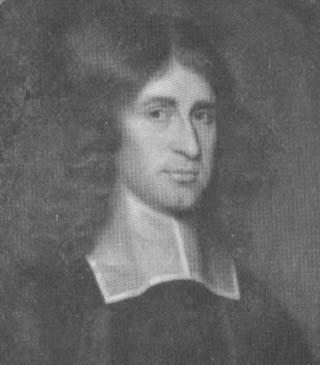
George Gillespie (1613–1648), Scottish Commissioner to the Westminster Assembly who wrote Aaron's Rod Blossoming, one of the most important defenses of presbyterian polity.

The Presbyterian party initiated a massive public relations campaign and it was during 1646 that many of the major defenses of Presbyterianism were published, beginning with Jus Divinum Regiminis Ecclesiastici; or, The Divine Right of Church Government Asserted and Evidenced by the Holy Scriptures. By sundry Ministers of Christ within the City of London, published in December 1646. One of the Scottish Commissioners, Samuel Rutherford, published a book entitled The Divine Right of Church Government and Excommunication. A second Scottish Commissioner, George Gillespie engaged in a pamphlet debate with Coleman: in response to a sermon which Coleman published advocating the Erastian position, Gillespie published A Brotherly Examination of some Passages of Mr. Coleman’s late printed Sermon; Coleman responded with A Brotherly Examination Re-examined; Gillespie responded with Nihil Respondes; Coleman replied with Male Dicis Maledicis; and Gillespie responded with Male Audis. Gillespie also had words for William Prynne, who had written in favour of Parliament's ordinance; Prynne was a special target of attack when Gillespie produced his magnum opus, Aaron’s Rod Blossoming; or, The Divine Ordinance of Church Government Vindicated, a work which partially incorporated material from the controversy with Coleman.

The Presbyterian party also used their strength in London to petition the Parliament in favour of their position.

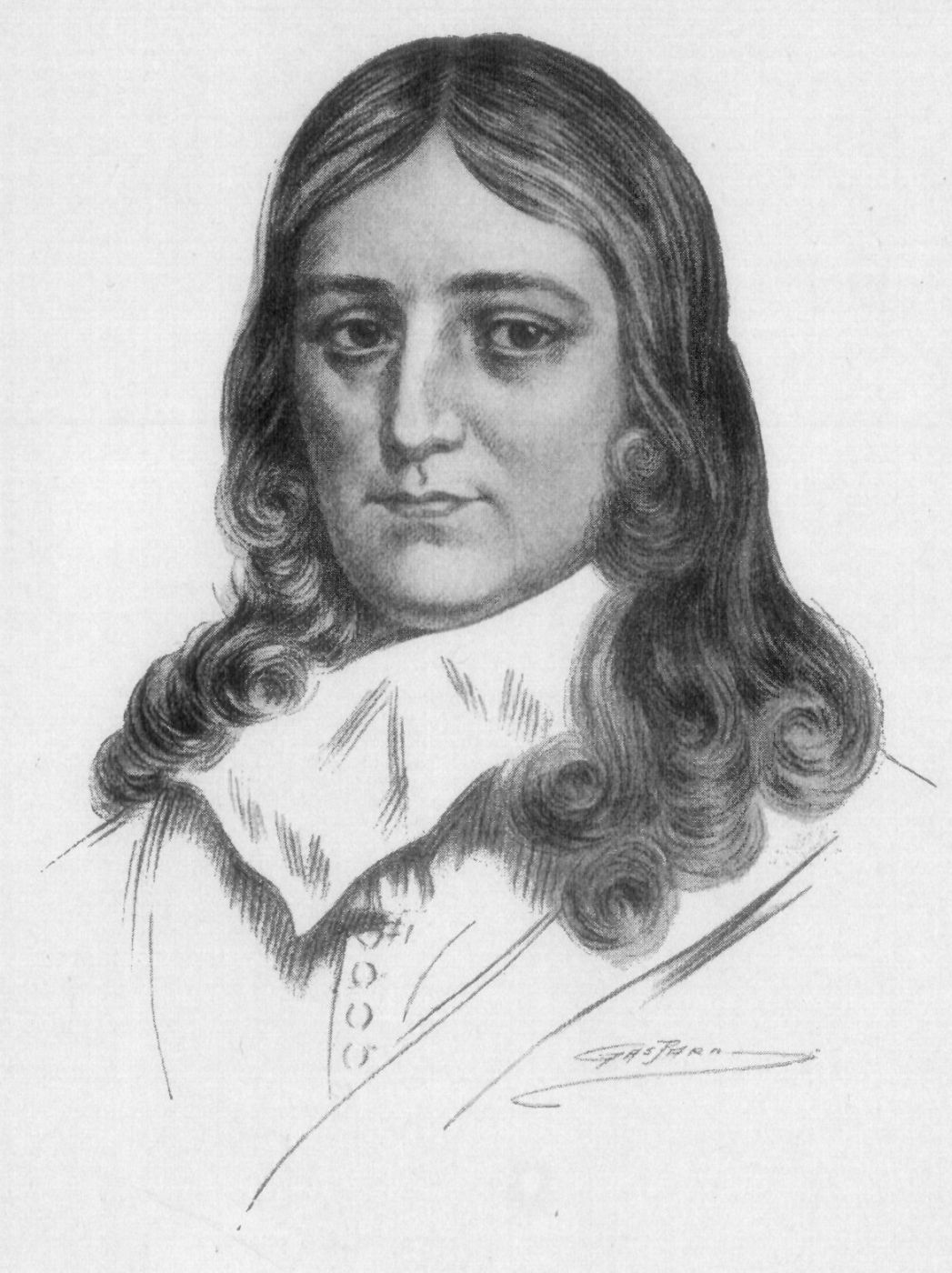
John Milton (1608–1674), an Independent who wrote a famous poem "On the New Forcers of Conscience under the Long Parliament" denouncing the Long Parliament for not adopting religious liberty in 1645.

Although in August 1645, Parliament had passed an ordinance expressing its intent to establish elders throughout the country, it had not provided instruction on how this should be done. On 14 March 1646, Parliament passed the "Ordinance for keeping scandalous persons from the Sacrament of the Lord's Supper, for the choice of elders, and for supplying defects in former Ordinances concerning church government." This Ordinance provided mechanisms for selecting elders throughout the country, and generally established a Presbyterian system of church governance for the country. However, this Ordinance again contained an Erastian element. The Ordinance created a new office of "commissioners to judge of scandalous offenses": these commissioners were granted jurisdiction to determine if a "scandalous offense" warranted excommunication and sessions were forbidden from excommunicating any church member without a commissioner first having approved the excommunication. The Presbyterian party was furious at the inclusion of the office of commissioner in the act that created Presbyterian polity in England.

The Independent party was angry that Parliament continued enforcing religious conformity. The most famous expression of the Independents' despondency at the Long Parliament's actions was John Milton's poem "On the New Forcers of Conscience under the Long Parliament". Milton argued that the Long Parliament was imitating popish tyranny in the church; violating the biblical principle of Christian liberty; and engaging in a course of action that would punish godly men. He concluded the poem with the line, "New Presbyter is but old Priest writ large" (a play on words since in English, the word "Priest" emerged as a contraction of the Greek word "Presbyter", but also claiming that the Presbyters under the Long Parliament's plan would be worse than the Catholic and Laudian priests whom Puritans abhorred).

=== The creation of the Westminster Standards, 1641–1646 ===
At the same time that the Westminster Assembly had been debating ecclesiology, they had also been reviewing worship and doctrine. These aspects generated less controversy amongst the divines.

Tasked with reforming the English liturgy, the Assembly first considered simply adopting John Knox's Book of Common Order, but this possibility was rejected by the Assembly in 1644, and the work of creating a new liturgy entrusted to a committee. This committee drafted the Directory of Public Worship, which was passed by the Westminster Assembly in 1645. Unlike the Book of Common Prayer, which had contained detailed rubrics regulating in detail how clergymen were to conduct service, the Directory of Public Worship is a loose agenda for worship, and expected the minister to fill in the details. Under the Directory, the focus of the service was on preaching.

The service opened with a reading of a passage from the Bible; followed by an opening prayer (selected or composed by the minister, or offered extemporaneously by the minister); followed by a sermon; and then ended with a closing prayer. The Directory provides guidelines as to what the prayers and sermon ought to contain, but does not contain any set forms of prayers. The Directory encouraged the public singing of psalms, but left it to the minister's discretion which psalms should be used in the service and where in the service (contrasted to the Book of Common Prayer, which set out the precise order for singing psalms for every day of the year in a way that ensured that the entire Book of Psalms is sung once a month). The sections dealing with baptism, communion, marriage, funerals, days of public fasting and days of public thanksgiving have a similar character.

In 1643, the Long Parliament had ordered the Westminster Assembly to draw up a new Confession of Faith and a new national catechism. The result was the production of the Westminster Confession of Faith and two catechisms, the Westminster Larger Catechism (designed to be comprehensive) and the Westminster Shorter Catechism (designed to be easier for children to memorize).

The Long Parliament approved the Directory of Public Worship in 1645. The Westminster Confession was presented to Parliament in 1646, but the House of Commons returned the Confession to the Assembly with the instruction that proof texts from Scripture should be added to the Confession. This version was resubmitted to Parliament in 1648, and, after a rigorous debate (during the course of which some chapters and sections approved by the Assembly were deleted), the Confession was ratified by the Long Parliament. The Larger Catechism was completed in 1647, the Shorter Catechism in 1648, and both received the approval of the Westminster Assembly and the Long Parliament.

Since the Westminster Standards had been produced under the eye of the Scottish Commissioners at the Westminster Assembly, the Scottish had no problem ratifying the Westminster Standards in order to keep Scotland's commitment to England under the Solemn League and Covenant. Since the Directory created a type of ecclesiology already practiced in the Church of Scotland, it was quickly ratified by the General Assembly of the Church of Scotland and then by the Parliament of Scotland in 1646. The Larger and Shorter Catechisms were ratified by General Assembly in 1648 and the Westminster Confession in 1649. The Westminster Standards are the general standards of the Church of Scotland and of nearly all Presbyterian denominations to this day.

Its work being completed, the Westminster Assembly was dissolved in 1649.

=== Oliver Cromwell and the Independent ascendancy in the New Model Army ===
Parliamentary forces had initially fared poorly against royalist forces: the first major battle of the war, the Battle of Edgehill on 23 October 1642, was inconclusive, as was the First Battle of Newbury of 20 September 1643. As noted above, as a result of their failure to defeat the king on the battlefield, in the wake of the First Battle of Newbury, the Long Parliament entered into an alliance with the Scottish, which resulted in the Solemn League and Covenant (by which the Long Parliament agreed to establish presbyterianism in England), and with the war being entrusted to a joint committee of Scottish and English known as the Committee of Both Kingdoms. With the addition of the Scottish forces, the parliamentarians won a decisive victory at the Battle of Marston Moor on 2 July 1644.

Oliver Cromwell (1599–1658), parliamentary commander who came to favor the Independents, and who brilliantly convinced the Long Parliament to pass the Self-denying Ordinance, as a result of which he was able to ensure that when the New Model Army was organized in 1645, it was dominated by Independents.

The most successful parliamentary cavalry commander had been Oliver Cromwell. Cromwell now approached the Committee of Both Kingdoms with a proposal. He had come to the conclusion that the military system was untenable because it relied on local militias defending local areas. Cromwell proposed that Parliament create a new army that would be deployable anywhere in the kingdom and not tied to a particular locality. After the Second Battle of Newbury of 27 October 1644, where parliamentary forces greatly outnumbered royalist forces and yet parliamentary forces were barely able to defeat the royalist forces, Cromwell redoubled his arguments in favor of creating a new army. At this point, most of the leaders in the parliamentary army were Presbyterians who supported the Presbyterians at the Westminster Assembly. Cromwell, however, had also been following the Westminster Assembly and sided with the Independents. Cromwell thought that the Presbyterians in the army – notably his superior, Edward Montagu, 2nd Earl of Manchester – opposed his proposal to create a new and more effective army mainly because they wanted to make peace with the king. He also thought that the army's supreme commander, Robert Devereux, 3rd Earl of Essex, shared Manchester's views. Cromwell, however, felt that parliamentary forces should seek total victory over the royalists, and since he distrusted Charles, he felt that Charles should have no role in any post-war government.

Cromwell, who was an MP as well as a military commander, outmaneuvered his enemies in the army. On 9 December 1644, Cromwell introduced a bill in Parliament saying that no member of either the House of Commons or the House of Lords could retain his position as a military commander while serving as a member of Parliament. Members would have to choose: either resign from Parliament or resign from the army. Cromwell's bill was passed by the House of Commons but rejected by the House of Lords in January 1645, who were worried that this would mean that no nobleman could serve as a commander in the army. To assuage this worry, Cromwell re-introduced his bill with a provision saying that, if Parliament wished, it could re-appoint to the army any parliamentarian who resigned from the army if it so chose. The Lords were ultimately persuaded by Cromwell, and on 13 January 1645 passed this bill, known now as the Self-denying Ordinance.

At roughly the same time, on 6 January 1645, the Committee of Both Kingdoms approved Cromwell's request and authorized the creation of the New Model Army. In the wake of the Self-denying Ordinance, Essex and Manchester resigned from the army in order to retain their positions in the House of Lords. Cromwell, instead, resigned from the House of Commons rather than forfeit his position in the army. Thus, when the New Model Army was organized under Sir Thomas Fairfax, Cromwell was the most senior army commander left in the army. Fairfax therefore leaned on Cromwell as his number-two during the organization of the New Model Army. Cromwell worked to ensure that no Presbyterians were recruited to the New Model Army, and that Independents were encouraged to join the New Model Army. Cromwell had thus created a situation where the Presbyterians dominated the Long Parliament, but the Independents dominated the New Model Army.

The Soldier's Catechism, which set out the rules and regulations of the New Model Army.

At the Battle of Naseby on 16 June 1645, the New Model Army achieved a decisive victory over royalist forces. A number of subsequent battles were needed to defeat the royalist forces. In May 1646, Charles surrendered himself to Scottish forces at Southwell, Nottinghamshire.

Entering 1647, the leaders of the Long Parliament and the Scottish favored peace with Charles and a restoration of Charles to power as a constitutional monarch, while Oliver Cromwell, the Independent leader of the New Model Army, wanted to rid the country of Charles. The Scottish and the Presbyterian party at the Westminster Assembly were pushing for a pure form of Presbyterian polity for the Church of England, while the Long Parliament had enacted a form of presbyterianism which contained Erastian elements which the Westminster Presbyterian party and the Scottish found deeply distasteful. Under these circumstances, the Scottish, and the Presbyterian party at the Westminster Assembly (a party which had been dominated by the Scottish Commissioners) decided to approach the king in order to seek his support against the Independents and the Erastians.

=== The Second English Civil War (1648–1649) and the Regicide (1649) ===
In summer and fall 1647, Henry Ireton and John Lambert negotiated with both houses of parliament and eventually the Army and Parliament reached agreement on a set of proposals, known as the Heads of Proposals, which were presented to Charles in November 1647. The main propositions were

- Royalists had to wait five years before running for or holding an office.
- The Book of Common Prayer was allowed to be read but not mandatory, and no penalties should be made for not going to church, or attending other acts of worship.
- The sitting Parliament was to set a date for its own termination. Thereafter, biennial Parliaments were to be called (i.e. every two years), which would sit for a minimum of 120 days and maximum of 240 days. Constituencies were to be reorganized.
- Episcopacy would be retained in church government, but the power of the bishops would be substantially reduced.
- Parliament was to control the appointment of state officials and officers in the army and navy for 10 years.

Charles, however, rejected the Heads of Proposals.

Instead, Charles negotiated with a faction of Scottish Covenanters and on 26 December 1647, signed The Engagement, a secret treaty with the group of Scottish Covenanters who became known as the Engagers. Under the Engagement, Charles agreed that episcopacy should be suppressed in the Church of England, and he agreed to support presbyterianism for three years, after which a permanent solution to the question of the church's polity could be worked out. In exchange, the Engagers agreed to bring an army of 20,000 into England to suppress the New Model Army and restore Charles to the throne. This led to the Second English Civil War. The royalist forces were defeated decisively at the Battle of Preston on 17–19 August 1648.

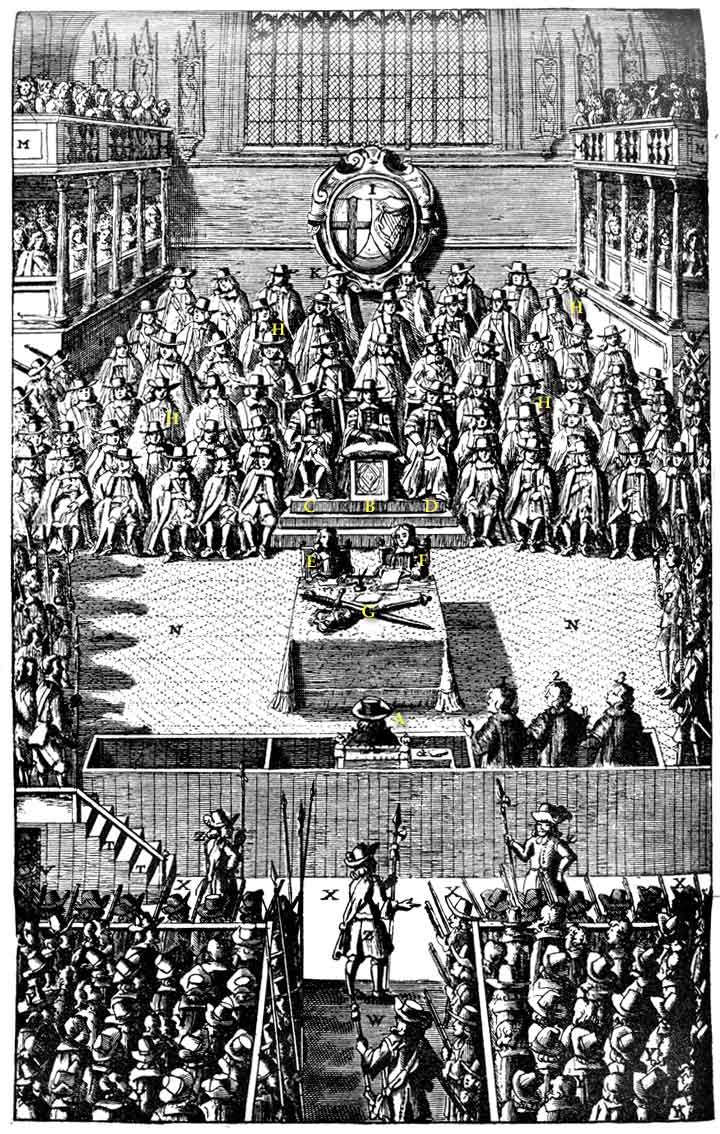
Print depicting the trial of Charles I (1600–1649) in 1649. While opposition to putting Charles on trial was strong, the Independents in the New Model Army insisted on a trial, and then an execution, and purged the Long Parliament so that the trial and execution could go ahead.

The Independents in the Army argued that the King was "Charles Stuart, that man of blood" who deserved to be punished, and that the outcome of the First English Civil War had been proof of God's judgment against Charles. Taking up arms after that judgment had been rendered resulted in the shedding of innocent blood. The leaders of the army therefore drafted The Remonstrance of the Army in November 1648, calling on the Long Parliament to execute Charles and to replace hereditary monarchy in England with an elective monarchy. When the Long Parliament rejected the Army's Remonstrance, the Army Council would take decisive action.

On Wednesday 6 December Colonel Thomas Pride's Regiment of Foot took up position on the stairs leading to the House. Pride stood at the top of the stairs. As MPs arrived, he checked them against the list provided to him; Lord Grey of Groby helped to identify those to be arrested and those to be prevented from entering. Pride's Purge excluded all but about 200 members of the about the 500 members who were entitled to sit before the purge.

After the Purge, the remaining members (who were sympathetic to the Independent party and the Army Council)—henceforth known as the Rump Parliament—proceeded to do what the Long Parliament had refused to do: put Charles on trial for high treason. The House of Commons passed an act on 3 January 1649 creating a High Court of Justice for the trial of Charles I. This Act was rejected by the House of Lords, but the Army insisted that the trial should go ahead. It began on 20 January 1649 in Westminster Hall and ended on 27 January 1649 with a guilty verdict. 59 Commissioners signed Charles' death warrant, and he was subsequently beheaded on 30 January 1649.

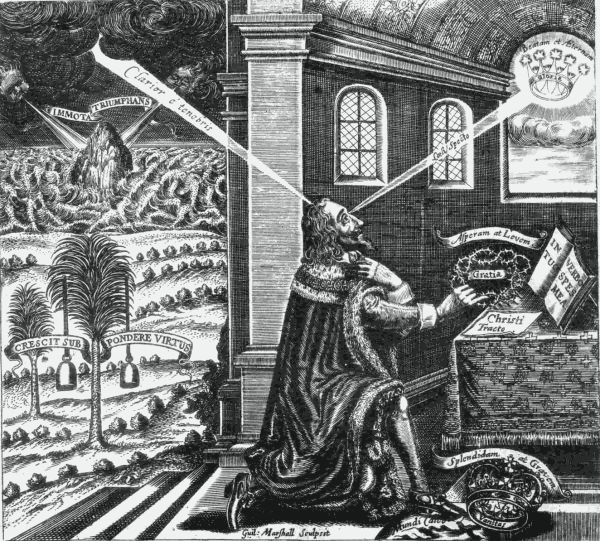
Frontispiece of Eikon Basilike, a book purportedly by King Charles (1600–1649), but likely ghost-written by John Gauden (1605–1662) and which appeared immediately after Charles' execution in January 1649. Eikon Basilike portrayed Charles as a Christian saint who had been martyred for defending episcopacy in the Church of England against Puritan fanatics.

The execution of Charles I would be the lens through which the Puritan movement was viewed for generations. For its opponents, the outcome confirmed that Puritanism ultimately led to violent rebellion, and that there was a straight line from religious fanaticism to regicide. The largest single group of Puritans, the Presbyterians, had in fact opposed the regicide, but to the supporters of the king and of episcopacy, this seemed like too fine a distinction. For many Independents, the regicide was entirely justified: Charles was a man who had been a tyrant and who defied the will of God and therefore had to be punished.

Literary exchanges over the regicide occurred after royalists published Eikon Basilike immediately upon Charles's execution. Eikon Basilike purported to be written by Charles during his time in captivity, but was almost certainly ghost-written, likely by John Gauden. In the book, Charles is presented as a "devout son of the Church of England" who was unjustly hounded by Puritan persecutors and ultimately martyred for defending the Church of England against fanatics. John Milton, now the most important Independent polemicist, responded later in 1649 in a book he entitled Eikonoklastes, which was a point-by-point response to Eikon Basilike's flattering portrait of Charles and its unflattering portrait of the Parliamentarians and the Army.

== Sources ==
- Anonymous (1911). "Pride, Thomas" . Encyclopædia Britannica. Vol. 22 (11th ed.). p. 315.
- Bradley, Emily Tennyson (1890). "Grey, Thomas (1623?-1657)" . In Stephen, Leslie; Lee, Sidney (eds.). Dictionary of National Biography. Vol. 23. London: Smith, Elder & Co. pp. 206, 207.
- Firth, Charles Harding (1898). "Pride, Thomas". In Lee, Sidney (ed.). Dictionary of National Biography. Vol. 56. London: Smith, Elder & Co. p. 349.
- Gardiner, Samuel Rawson (1892). "Laud, William" . In Lee, Sidney (ed.). Dictionary of National Biography. Vol. 32. London: Smith, Elder & Co. pp. 185–194.
- Gardiner, Samuel Rawson (1891). History of England from the Accession of James I to the Outbreak of the Civil War, 1603-1642. Vol. 8 (New ed.). London, New York, Longmans, Green, and Co. pp. 167, 172.
- Hunneyball, Paul (2010). ROUS, Francis (1581–1659), of Landrake, Cornw.; later of Brixham, Devon, Eton, Bucks. and Acton, Mdx; in The History of Parliament: the House of Commons 1604–1629. CUP. ISBN 978-1107002258.
- Lee, Sidney (1885). "Abbot, George (1562-1633)" . In Stephen, Leslie (ed.). Dictionary of National Biography. Vol. 1. London: Smith, Elder & Co. pp. 5–20.
- Patterson, W. B. (1997). King James VI and I and the Reunion of Christendom. Cambridge University Press. p. 291. ISBN 9780521418058.
