= Peter Heylyn =

English ecclesiastic and author (1599–1662)

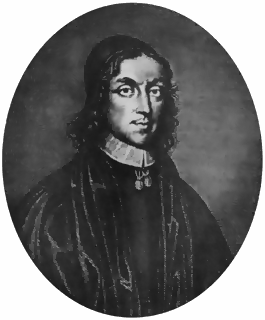
- Peter Heylyn
- Born: 29 November 1599; Burford, Oxfordshire
- Died: 8 May 1662 (aged 62)
- Other name: Peter Heylin
- Occupations: ecclesiastic and author

Peter Heylyn or Heylin (29 November 1599 – 8 May 1662) was an English ecclesiastic and author of many polemical, historical, political and theological tracts. He incorporated his political concepts into his geographical books Microcosmus in 1621 and Cosmographie (1657).

== Life ==
Heylyn was born in Burford, Oxfordshire, the son of Henry Heylyn and Elizabeth Clampard. He entered Merchant Taylors' School in March 1612. At 14 he was sent to Hart Hall, Oxford, and matriculated from Magdalen College, Oxford, on 19 January 1616, aged 16. He was awarded BA on 17 October 1617 and was elected a Fellow in 1618. He lectured on historical geography at Magdalen.

Heylyn was awarded MA on 1 July 1620. In 1620 he presented his lecture to Prince Charles, at Theobalds. He was incorporated at Cambridge University in 1621. In 1621 his lectures were published as Microcosmos: a Little Description of the Great World. This would prove to be his most popular work and by 1639, eight editions had been produced.

At college, where he was dubbed 'the perpetual dictator', Heylyn had been an outspoken controversialist. He subsequently became an outspoken preacher and one of Charles I's clerical followers. He was awarded a BD on 13 June 1629. As a member of the Arminian party he played a part in struggles between the Arminians and their opponents that disturbed England in the 1630s. In 1630 he lectured against the Feoffees for Impropriations. He became licensed Canon of Westminster in 1631 and Rector of Hemingford, Huntingdonshire, in the same year. He became Rector of Houghton-le-Spring, County Durham, in 1632 and rector of Alresford, Hampshire, in 1633. Also in 1633 he was licensed to preach and was awarded D.D. on 13 April 1633. He became a chaplain to Charles I. In 1639 he became Rector at South Warnborough, Hampshire.

He suffered for his loyalty to the king when, under the Commonwealth, he was deprived of his preferments. He subsequently settled at Lacies Court in Abingdon, from 1653 until 1660. Lacies Court is now the heads residence at Abingdon School. Heylyn supported Anthony Huish (Master of the School) in maintaining the services at St Nicholas Church where Huish was rector. This was opposed by the Puritan dominated town council. A house facing Bath Street from the Abingdon School grounds is named 'Heylyns' in commemoration.

At the Restoration, he left Abingdon and was made sub-Dean of Westminster, but poor health prevented further advancement.

He married Letitia Highgate and had a large family. His monument is in Westminster Abbey.

== Works ==
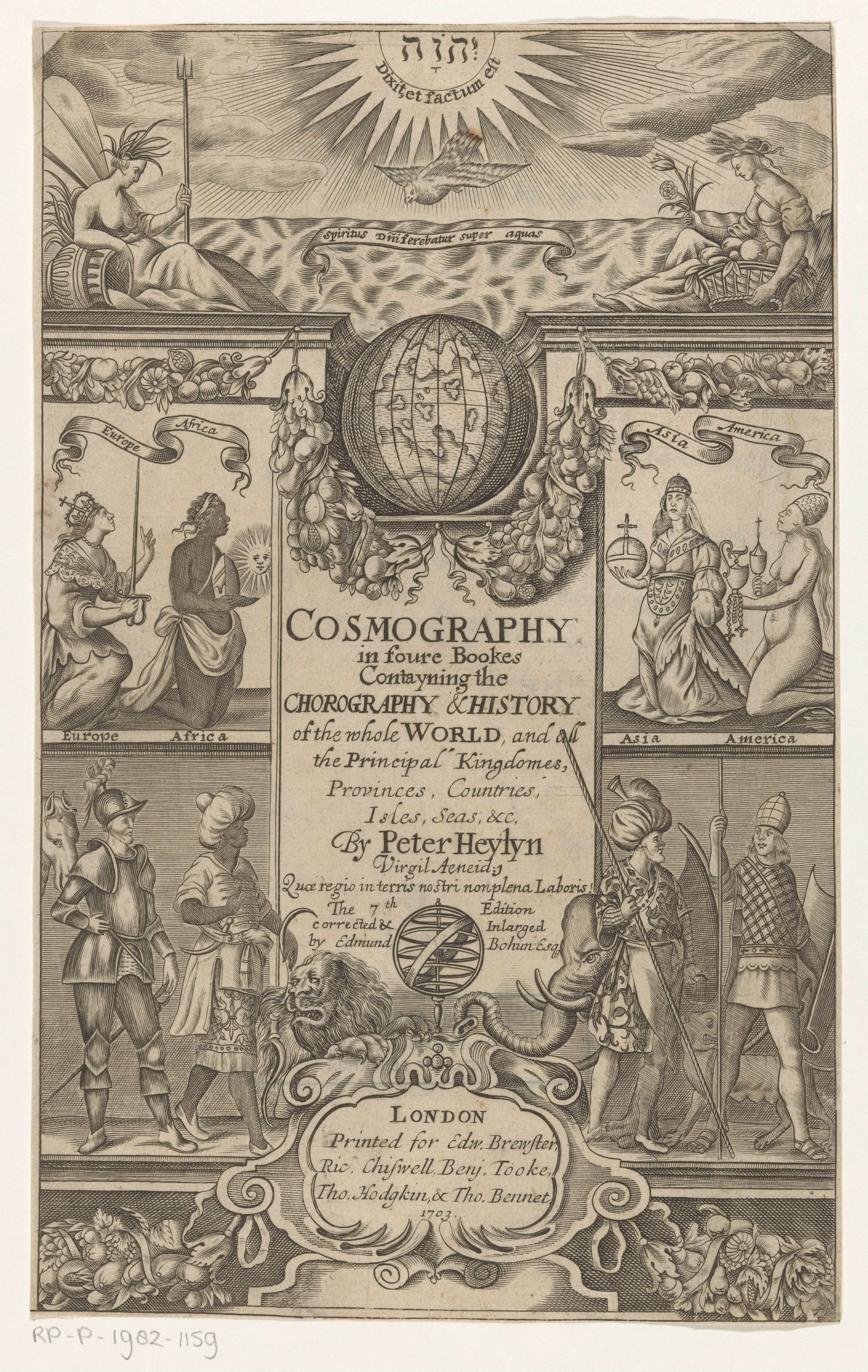
Peter Heylyn. Cosmography in foure Bookes. London: Edw. Brewster; Ric. Chiswell; Benj. Tooke; Tho. Hodgkin; Tho. Bennet, 1703.

He was a prolific writer, and a keen and acrimonious controversialist against the Puritans. Among his works are a History of the Reformation of the Church of England, and a Life of Archbishop William Laud (Cyprianus Anglicanus) (1668). He affixed Greek titles to two of his books, Κειμήλια Ἐκκλησιαστικά: Historical and miscellaneous tracts (1662) and Ἡρωολογία Anglorum; or, a help to English history (1641).

He was the writer of the "Cosmographie", an attempt to describe in meticulous detail every aspect of the known world in 1652, the geography, climate, customs, achievements, politics, and belief systems. It appears to have been the first description in print of Australia, and perhaps of California, Terra del Fuego, and other territories in the New World. He objected to the name "America" as it placed undue glory on Amerigo Vespucci, and recommended "Columbana" or "Cabotia" as more indicative of the true discoverers, Columbus and Cabot.

== Publications ==
Heylyn's publications include:

- Microcosmus. A little description of the great world 1621 (−1639); enlarged and entitled Cosmographie in four bookes, containing the chorographie and historie of the whole world 1652 (1674)
- The history of St. George of Cappadocia (1631)
- The history of the Sabbath (1636)
- A coale from the altar (1636)
- Antidotum Lincolniense; or an answer to a book entitled, The Holy Table, name and thing (1637)
- A brief and moderate answer to the seditious and scandalous Challenge of H. Burton (1637)
- Ἡρωολογια Anglorum; or, a help to English history (1641)
- The first table or, a catalogue of all the kings which have reigned in England, since the first entrance of the Romans (1641)
- The historie of episcopacie (1642)
- The undeceiving of the people in the point of tithes (1648)
- Extraneus vapulans; or, the observator rescued from the violent but vaine assaults of Hamon L'Estrange, (1656)
- A full relation of two journeys: the one, into the mainland of France; the other, into some of the adjacent islands (1656)
- Ecclesia vindicata; or, the Church of England justified (1657)
- The Stumbling-block of Disobedience and Rebellion, Cunningly Laid by [John] Calvin in the Subjects Way, Discovered, Censured, and Removed (1658)
- Examen historicum, or a discovery and examination of the mistakes in some modern histories (1659)
- Certamen epistolare; or the letter-combate with Mr. Baxter, etc. (1659)
- Historia quinqu-articularis; or a declaration of the judgement of the Western churches, particularly of the church of England, in the five controverted points reproached by the name of Arminianism (1660)
- Ecclesia restaurata; or, the History of the Reformation of the Church of England (1661)
- Aerius redivivus; or, the history of the presbyterians from 1536 to 1647 (written before 1662; 1670)
- Cyprianus Anglicus: Or, The History of the Life and Death, of the Most Reverend and Renowned Prelate William by Divine Providence, Lord Archbishop of Canterbury (written before 1662; 1668, 1671)
- Κειμήλια Ἐκκλησιαστικά Historical and miscellaneous tracts a 1662 (1681)
- Chorography and History of the Whole World (1682)

== Notes and references ==
=== Sources ===
- MacGillivray, Royce (1974). Restoration Historians and the English Civil War. The Hauge: Martinus Nijhoff.
- Peter Heylyn (1633). Mikrokosmos: A Little Description of the Great World. William Turner and Robert Allott.
