= Richard Sibbes =

Anglican theologian

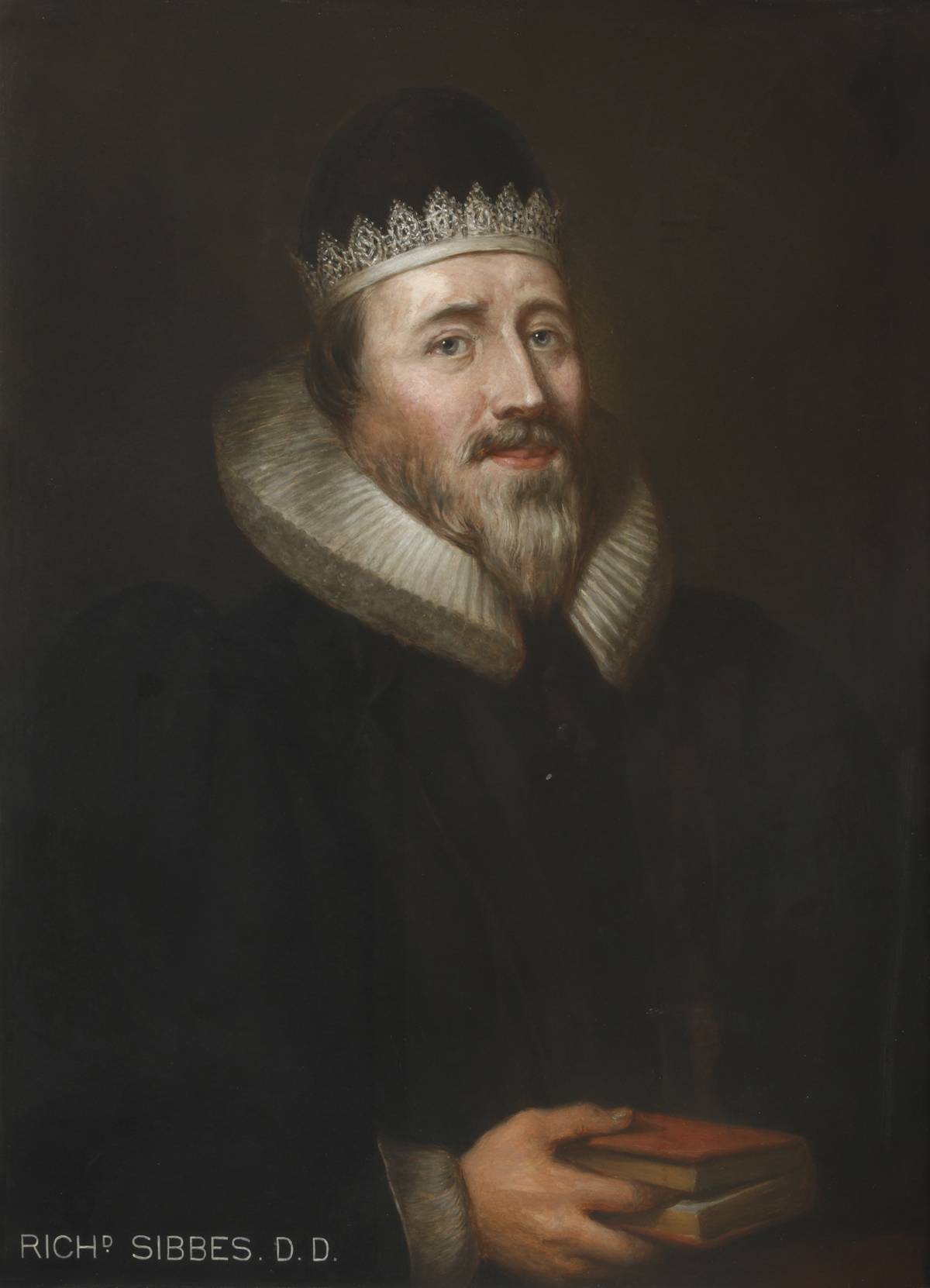
- Born: 1577; Tostock, Suffolk
- Died: 1635 (aged 57–58)
- Notable work: The Bruised Reed
- Theological work
- Era: Elizabethan era
- Tradition or movement: Anglicanism, Puritanism, Calvinism

Richard Sibbes (or Sibbs) (1577–1635) was an Anglican theologian. He is known as a Biblical exegete, and as a representative, with William Perkins and John Preston, of what has been called "main-line" Puritanism because he always remained in the Church of England and worshiped according to the Book of Common Prayer.

== Life ==
He was born in Tostock, Suffolk, where his father was a wheelwright; other sources say Sudbury. After attending Bury St Edmunds Grammar School, he attended St John's College, Cambridge from 1595. He was lecturer at Holy Trinity Church, Cambridge, from 1610 or 1611 to 1615 or 1616. It was erroneously held by 18th and 19th century scholars that Sibbes was deprived of his various academic posts on account of his Puritanism. In fact he was never deprived of any of his posts, due to his ingenuity of the system.

He was then preacher at Gray's Inn, London, from 1617, returning to Cambridge as Master of Catherine Hall in 1626, without giving up the London position.

Also in 1626, the support group known as the Feoffees for Impropriations was set up, and Sibbes was a founding member. (It built on an informal grouping dating back to 1613). It was closely linked to St Antholin, Budge Row, for its seven years of existence: it was shut down in 1633. With others, he worked to fund and provide platforms for preachers. He was one of four ministers in the original feoffees, the other members being chosen as four lawyers and four laymen.

== Works ==
He was the author of several devotional works expressing intense religious feeling – The Saint's Cordial (1629), The Bruised Reed and Smoking Flax (1631, exegesis of Isaiah 42:3), The Soules Conflict (1635), etc.

A volume of sermons appeared in 1630, dedicated to Horace Vere, 1st Baron Vere of Tilbury and his wife Lady Mare. Most of the other works were first published by Thomas Goodwin and Philip Nye, after Sibbes died. The content belied the mainly moderate and conforming attitudes for which Sibbes was known in his lifetime. Beames of Divine Light, A Description of Christ in Three Sermons and Bowels Opened appeared in 1639, as did The Returning Backslider, sermons on the Book of Hosea.

A complete edition was published 1862–1864 in Edinburgh, in seven volumes, by James Nichol, with a biographical memoir by Alexander Grosart.

== Views ==
The clerical leaders of the Feoffees, Davenport, Gouge and Sibbes, all adhered to Calvinist covenant theology, as shaped by the English theologians Perkins, Preston, William Ames, and Thomas Taylor. There was a tacit assumption of a state church. Sibbes believed the Second Coming was necessary to complete the work that Christ had begun.

Efforts to define further the Puritanism of Sibbes – which is a term much debated – place him in various groups. Under pious "non-separatists", he is with Preston, Richard Baxter, Robert Bolton, and John Dod. Under those who would conform to set forms of worship, he is with Dod, Nicholas Byfield, Richard Capel, John Downame, Arthur Hildersham, and Richard Stock (another Feoffee). He is also a fully conforming Puritan, with Preston, Samuel Ward, and Robert Hill. With Richard Bernard, he was a moderate Calvinist who promoted religious tolerance. With Perkins, Preston, Baxter and Henry Newcome, he was a moderate and non-Presbyterian Puritan. However one classifies him, it is undeniable that he was a faithful member of the Elizabethan church.

His perspective was European, or even wider, and he saw Catholicism in terms of a repressive conspiracy. With Davenport, Gouge, Taylor, Thomas Gataker, John Stoughton, and Josias Shute, he helped raise money for Protestants of the Electorate of the Palatinate affected by the opening of the Thirty Years' War; and later for John Dury's missions. Laud brought up Sibbes, Davenport, Gouge and Taylor in front of the Court of High Commission for this. The Fountain Opened (1638) advocated mission work.

== Quotes ==
- “There is more mercy in Christ than sin in us.”

== Influence ==
His works were much read in New England. Thomas Hooker, prominent there from 1633, was directly influenced by Sibbes, and his "espousal theology", using marriage as a religious metaphor, draws on The Bruised Reed and Bowels Opened.

The poet George Herbert was a contemporary, and there are suggestions on parallels. Where Herbert speaks in The Church Militant about the westward movement of the propagation of the gospel, Christopher Hill comments that this may have come from The Bruised Reed. Other examples have been proposed by Doerksen.

Sibbes was cited by the Methodist John Wesley. The Baptist preacher Charles Spurgeon studied his craft in Sibbes, Perkins and Thomas Manton. The evangelical Martyn Lloyd-Jones wrote in the highest terms of his own encounter with the work of Sibbes.

== Sources ==
- Adam, Peter (2005), A Church Halfly Reformed, archived from the original on 20 July 2011
- Ball, Bryan (1975), A Great Expectation, Leiden: Brill, ISBN 9004043152
- Banner of Truth Trust (1998), "Publisher's Foreword", The Bruised Reed, Edinburgh: Banner of Truth Trust, ISBN 0851517404
- Beeke, Joel; Pederson, Randall (2006), "Richard Sibbes", Meet the Puritans, Grand Rapids: Reformation Heritage Books, ISBN 1601780001
- Bremer, Francis, ed. (2006), "Richard Sibbes", Puritans and Puritanism in Europe and America, New York: ABC-Clio, ISBN 1576076784
- Dever, Mark (2018), The Affectionate Theology of Richard Sibbes, Orlando: Reformation Trust, ISBN 978-1567698541
- Dever, Mark (6 February 2009), "Moderation and Deprivation", The Journal of Ecclesiastical History, 43 (3): 396–413, doi:10.1017/S0022046900001354
- Dever, Mark (2000), Richard Sibbes, Macon: Mercer University Press, ISBN 0865546576
- Doerksen, Daniel (1997), Conforming to the Word, Lewisburg: Bucknell University Press, ISBN 0838753345
- Doerksen, Daniel (1995), "Milton and the Jacobean Church of England", Early Modern Literary Studies
- Dreyer, Frederick (1999), The Genesis of Methodism, Bethlehem: Lehigh University Press, ISBN 0585189013
- Frost, Ronald (2004), "The Bruised Reed", in Kapic, Kelly; Gleason, Randall (eds.), The Devoted Life, Downers Grove: InterVarsit Press, ISBN 0830827943
- Frost, Ronald (1996), Richard Sibbes' Theology of Grace and the Division of English Reformed Theology, London: University of London, OCLC 59317043
- Hall, David (October 2002), "Orthodoxy and Heterodoxy on Trial", The Harvard Theological Review, 95 (4), Cambridge: Cambridge University Press: 437–452, doi:10.1017/S0017816002000287, JSTOR 4150730, S2CID 162594440
- Herbert, George (2007), Wilcox, Helen (ed.), The English Poems of George Herbert, Cambridge: Cambridge University Press, ISBN 978-0521868211
- Hill, Christopher (1956), Economic Problems of the Church, Oxford: Clarendon Press, OCLC 223865415
- Hill, Christopher (1993), The English Bible and the Seventeenth-Century Revolution, London: Allen Lane, ISBN 0713990783
- Hill, Christopher (1984), The Experience of Defeat, New York: Viking, ISBN 0670302082
- Hill, Christopher (1964), Society and Puritanism in Pre-Revolutionary England, New York: Schocken Books, OCLC 398857
- Hill, Christopher (1976), Some Intellectual Consequences of the English Revolution, Madison: University of Wisconsin Press, ISBN 0299081400
- Hill, Christopher (1989), A Turbulent, Seditious, and Factious People, Oxford: Oxford University Press, ISBN 0192826913
- Lamont, William (1979), Richard Baxter and the Millennium, London: Croom Helm, ISBN 084766189X
- Lloyd-Jones, D. Martyn (1973), Preaching and Preachers, London: Hodder and Stoughton, ISBN 0340156120
- Milton, Anthony (1996), Catholic and Reformed, Cambridge: Cambridge University Press, ISBN 0521401410
- Old, Hughes (2002), Worship, Louisville: Westminster John Knox Press, ISBN 0664225799
- Porterfield, Amanda (1992), Female Piety in Puritan New England, New York: Oxford University Press, ISBN 0195068211
- Pyle, Andrew, ed. (2000), "Richard Sibbes", The Dictionary of Seventeenth-Century British Philosophers, vol. 2, Bristol: Thoemmes Press
- Rooy, Sidney (1997), "Sibbes, Richard", in Anderson, Gerald (ed.), Biographical Dictionary of Christian Missions, New York: Macmillan Reference USA, ISBN 0028646045
- Tyacke, Nicholas (2001), Aspects of English Protestantism, c. 1530–1700, Manchester: Manchester University Press, ISBN 0719053919
- Venn, John; Venn, John Archibald (1953), "Richard Sibbs", in Venn, John; Venn, John Archibald (eds.), Alumni Cantabrigienses (Online ed.), Cambridge: Cambridge University Press
