= Impropriation =

Concept in English ecclesiastical law

Impropriation, a term from English ecclesiastical law, was the destination of income from tithes of a church benefice to a layman. With the establishment of the parish system in England, it was necessary for all church property and income to have a specific owner. This was the parochianus, parson, or rector who was sustained by the benefice income while providing personally for the cure of souls, the everyday pastoral and religious duties. The parson was technically a corporation sole. (Note: A legal entity vested in an individual and his successors by reason of his office which persists even though there is no living person holding it and its affairs are being administered by "sequestrators") Over the centuries, the benefice came to be considered a piece of property whose holder could discharge the spiritual responsibilities by a deputy, and many parishes were annexed by monasteries or other spiritual corporations, a process known as appropriation. These ecclesiastical holders were bound to provide for a cleric known as a 'vicar' for the cure of souls, but could use any excess income as they pleased.

Impropriation was similar except that the holder was a layman or secular corporation, again obliged to select and support a cleric to serve the parish. After 1200, no layman could have a cure of souls, but such grants were still occasionally made. When the monastic properties passed into lay hands at the Reformation, many appropriations were converted to impropriations, and by 1603, of a total 9284 benefices, 3489 were held by impropriators or lay rectors. By custom, they were obliged to maintain the chancel in good repair.

== Sectarian controversy ==
Impropriations were deeply controversial, being a form of simony. They could be purchased to sway a parish toward the holder's favored interpretation of Protestantism. Local churchgoers had little alternative to the official parish church, and impropriations were a questionable but effective political tactic during the historic struggle between Established and Puritan sects in England. They also fostered the practice of "pluralism," where one minister would hold the income of several churches, usually serving them inadequately.

Impropriations came under attack from the Puritans at the Hampton Court Conference of 1604. King James I agreed to abolish them, but the reform was never enacted.

Puritans responded by organizing the Feoffees for Impropriations, which raised funds for impropriations of their own. From 1625 to 1633, the group purchased impropriations and advowsons, appointing Puritans to ministerial and lecturing positions. The legal suppression of the Feoffees was an early move of the high church Laudian movement leading up to the English Civil War.

The seventeenth-century impropriation controversies were related to those concerning the collection of tithes, which were tenaciously resisted by the Quakers, especially from 1652 to 1700.

== See also ==
- Advowson
