= Matthias Martinius =

Matthias Martinius (Martini) (1572 – 30 December 1630) was a German Calvinist theologian and educator.

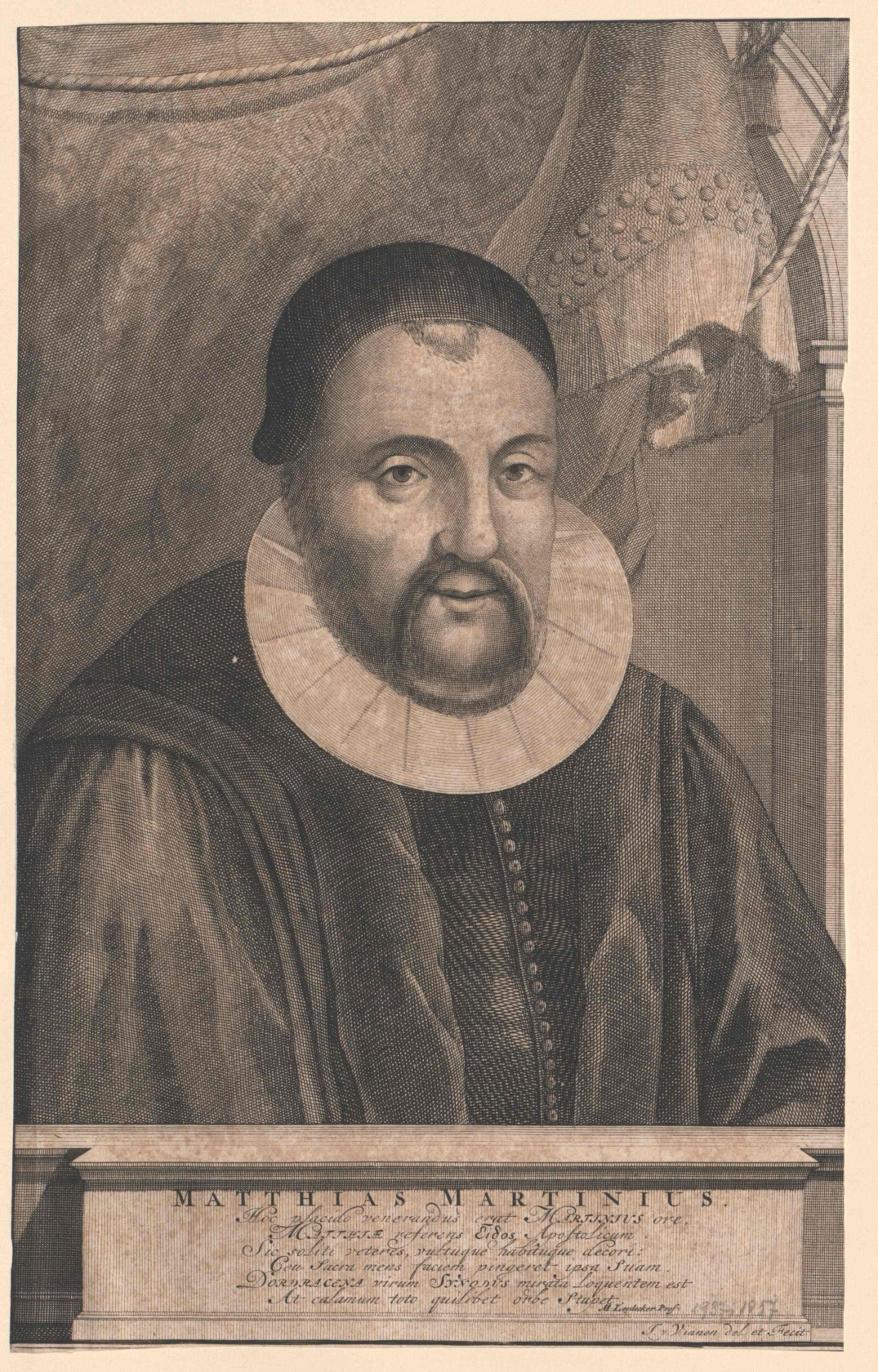
Matthias Martinius, 1711 engraving by Jan van Vianen.

== Life ==
He was born in Freienhagen, Waldeck and educated at Herborn Academy. He became court preacher at Dillenburg, and then taught at Herborn before moving to Emden in 1607.

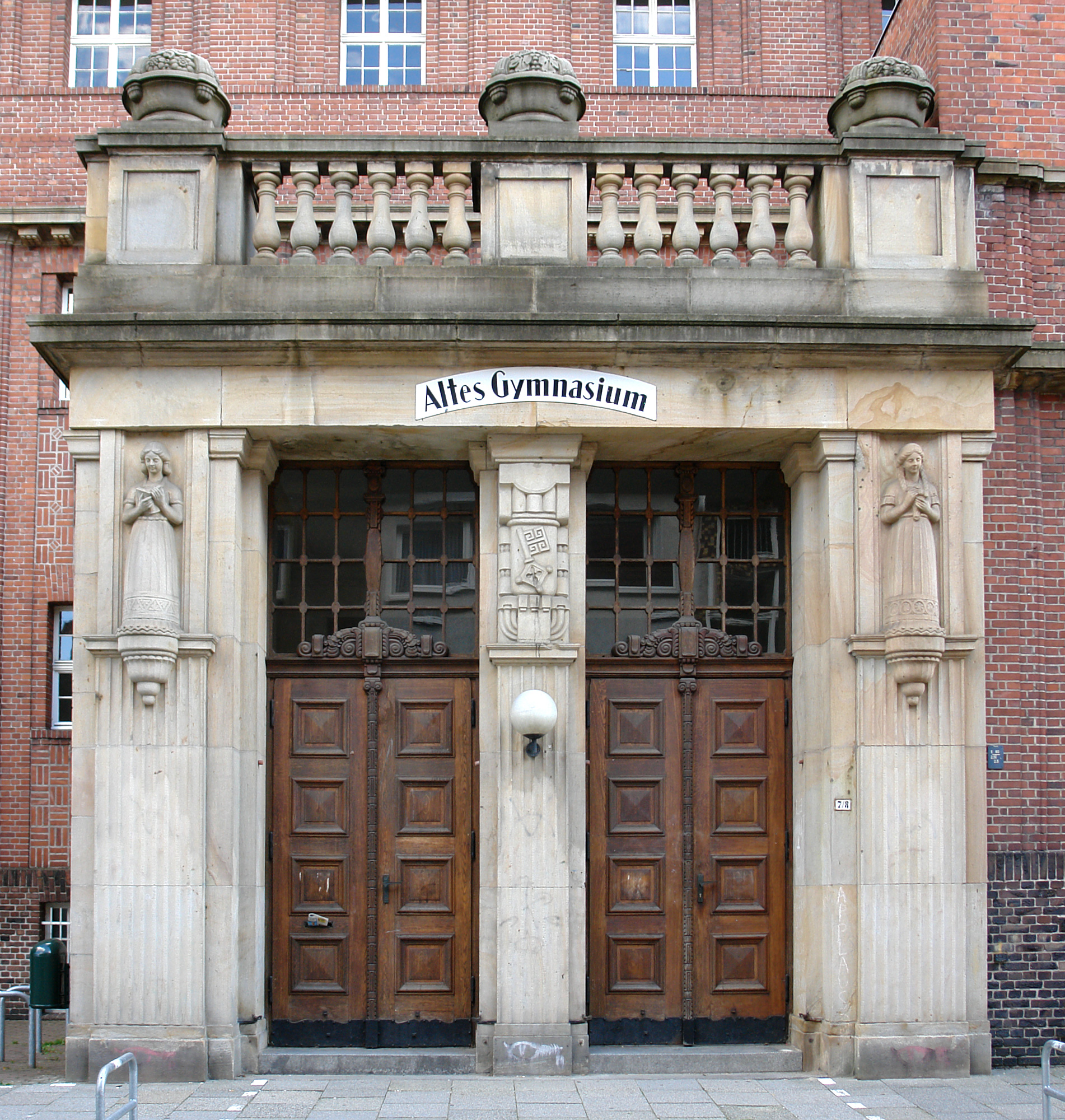
Entrance to the old Gymnasium, Bremen.

From 1610 Martinius was the founding rector of the Gymnasium Illustre at Bremen. The teaching at Bremen influenced in particular Johannes Cocceius, student under Martinius and Ludwig Crocius.

At the Synod of Dort of 1618 Martinius was present as a representative of Bremen. He was involved in controversy with the Lutherans Balthasar Mentzer and Philipp Nicolai.

== Views ==
Martinius and the Bremen academy played an important role in the later developments of covenant theology. His views as Calvinist were considered moderate, and anticipated hypothetical universalism. The Bremen delegation at Dort, together with the English delegates John Davenant and Samuel Ward, were conspicuous for arguing against the Gomarist line on doctrine. Martinius absented himself from a number of sessions, clashed with Gomarus, Abraham Scultetus and Sibrandus Lubbertus, and was close to walking out of the Synod. The Synod's preference for infralapsarianism has been attributed to Martinius.

== Works ==
- Lexicon philologicum
- Idea Methodica et brevis encyclopaediae.
