= Hypothetical universalism =

Christian doctrine

Hypothetical Universalism (universalismus hypotheticus; also called dual-intention atonement) is one of the major trajectories within Reformed Christian atonement theology which holds that Jesus Christ's death paid the penalty for the sins of all humanity, but that this salvation is applied conditionally upon faith. Often described as a "middle way" or dual-intention system, it distinguishes between the universal extent of Christ's satisfaction, which objectively makes every human being salvable by removing all legal obstacles on God's side, and the particular intent to apply it. Under this framework, because fallen human beings lack the moral ability to believe on their own, God unconditionally decrees to sovereignly provide the gift of faith to the elect alone.

It is argued to have originated in the early Reformation with theologians like Heinrich Bullinger and Wolfgang Musculus, and was actively championed by prominent delegates at the Synod of Dort, such as the Anglican bishop John Davenant and the German divine Matthias Martinius, it is also said to have been held by certain members of the Westminster Assembly. Consequently, historic confessional standards like the Canons of Dort and the Westminster Confession were formulated with deliberate breadth, allowing both hypothetical universalists and strict particularists, who believed Christ substituted only for the elect, to subscribe in good faith.

== Etymology ==
The term hypothetical universalism was not an actor's term employed by the early Reformers, nor was it largely known during the sixteenth and early seventeenth century, having only emerged as a distinct theological discriptor in the mid-seventeenth century. Historically, the label originated as a pejorative term, "les hypothétiques" (the hypotheticals), coined by French opponents of the Saumur Academy to describe the controversial doctrines of John Cameron and Moïse Amyraut. The first recorded instance of this label in surviving documents appears in a letter written by French Reformed theologian Guillaume Rivet in July 1645. Prior to 1650, the Swiss Reformed typically referred to the Saumurian theologians simply as universalists. The prefix hypothetical was used by critics to mock the Saumurian claim that God willed the salvation of all humanity on the condition of faith, a decree opponents argued was frustratory because this universal salvation was never actually realized.

Theologians within the hypothetical universalist tradition historically objected to the hypothetical label, arguing that Christ's death was not a hypothetical satisfaction but an actual, complete, and objective payment for the sins of all mankind. They maintained that the term is misleading because the only element in their system that is hypothetical is the conditional application of the atonement or in other words, that the benefits of Christ's objective death are conditionally applied upon personal faith.

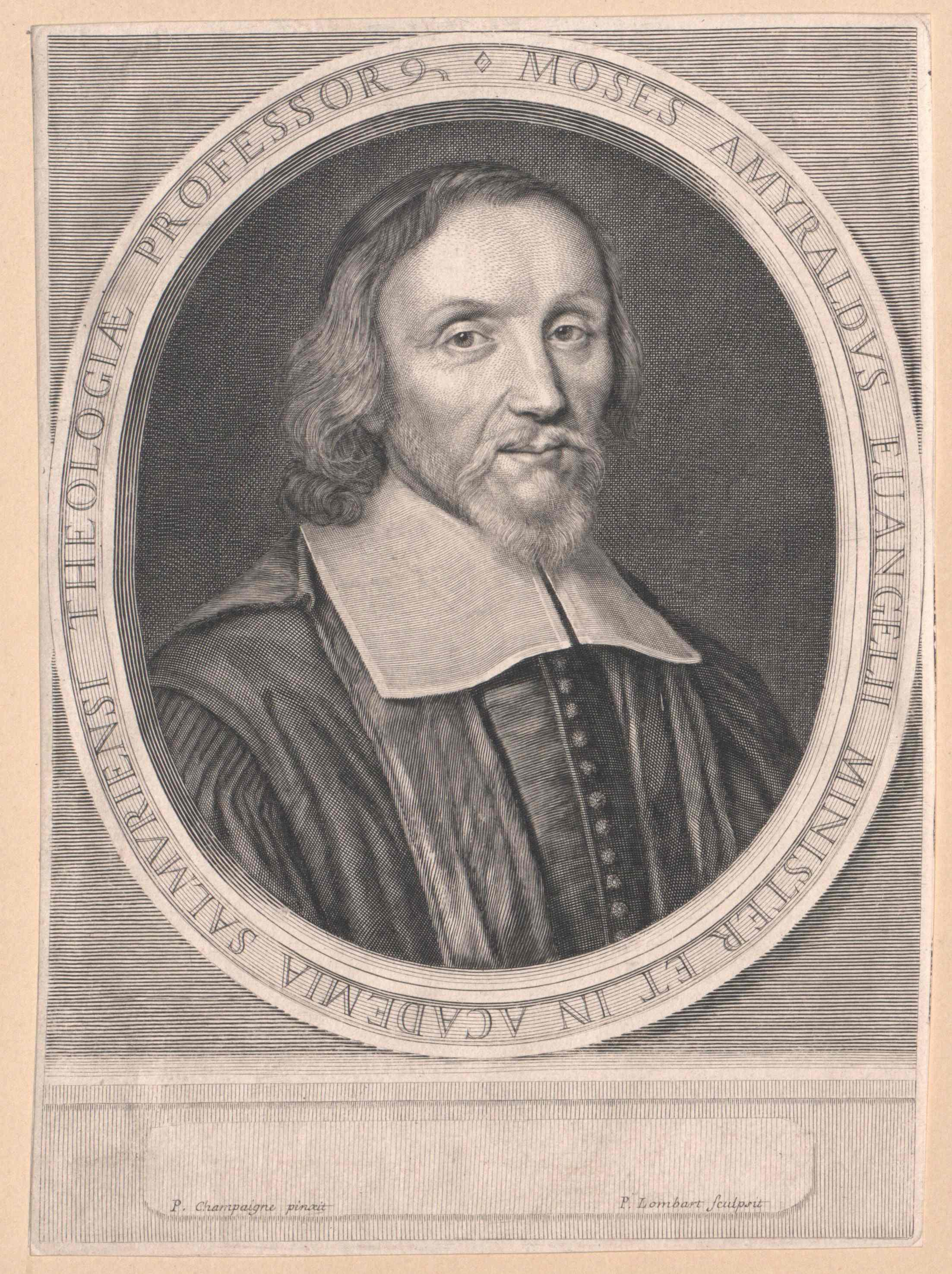
Moïse Amyraut (1596–1664), a prominent French Protestant theologian associated with Hypothetical Universalism.

== Definition ==
Under a dual-intention framework, hypothetical universalism distinguishes between the universal extent of Christ's satisfaction on the cross and the particular intent of its application. The system asserts that Christ's death paid the penalty for all human sin, removing all objective legal barriers on God's side to render every individual saveable. However, because fallen human beings are morally unable to believe on their own, God eternally and unconditionally decreed to sovereignly apply these benefits to the elect alone by granting them the gift of faith. Thus, the atonement is understood as a universal remedy conditionally applicable to all, but absolutely and infallibly applied to the elect.

This dual-intention framework is distinct from the strict particularist view, which asserts that Christ’s substitutionary satisfaction was strictly limited in its objective scope to the sins of the elect alone. Strict particularists argue that the sufficiency of the cross is merely an intrinsic or bare sufficiency. In this view, held by theologians like Theodore Beza and later John Owen, Christ's death possesses infinite worth in the abstract because of his divine person, but it was never intentionally designed, ordained, or offered by God to pay the penalty for the sins of the non-elect. Strict particularists collapsed sufficiency into efficiency, arguing that to pay a price for someone's sins is to logically guarantee their eventual salvation. Grounded in a commercial or pecuniary model of the atonement, high Calvinists assert that if Christ had satisfied for the sins of the reprobate, God would be guilty of injustice by demanding a double payment of the same debt, punishing Christ on the cross and then the unbeliever in hell.

== History ==
=== Patristic Era ===
Although the extent of the atonement was not a highly contested dogmatic controversy during the patristic era, its historical interpretation remains a major point of debate among modern scholars. Proponents of hypothetical universalism claim that the early Church Fathers unanimously held to an unlimited atonement, pointing to their frequent use of universal language to describe the scope of Christ’s death. To support this, they highlight statements from Augustine of Hippo describing Christ's death as the "ransom for the whole world" and his view that Christ redeemed even the reprobate Judas. They also cite Augustine's disciple, Prosper of Aquitaine, who in his later writings explicitly asserted that Christ died for all men without exception.

Conversely, defenders of definite atonement push back, arguing that this early language simply reflected the unrefined terminology of scripture rather than a defined doctrine of universal satisfaction. They contend that Augustine's monergistic views on predestination and grace logically imply a limited, particularist intent in the cross. Particularist writers argue that Augustine interpreted "the whole world" in key texts like 1 John 2:2 to mean only "the church of all nations", and they point to Prosper’s early anti-Pelagian writings which explicitly state that Christ was crucified only for those who ultimately profit from his death.

=== Gottschalk of Orbais ===
The first explicit and systematic debate over the extent of Christ's satisfaction occurred in the ninth century with the monk Gottschalk of Orbais. Gottschalk argued for a strict double predestination, asserting that Christ was crucified and died only for the elect. His views were immediately opposed by church leaders like Hincmar of Reims, who argued that Christ's redemption was paid for all humanity and that those who perish do so solely through their own unbelief. Gottschalk’s strict particularism was condemned at the Council of Quierzy but was subsequently tolerated or vindicated at the Council of Valence, showing that the medieval church was deeply divided on the issue.

=== Peter Lombard and Thomas Aquinas ===
In the twelfth century, Peter Lombard codified the famous scholastic formula:

"Christ is the priest, as he is also the victim and the price of our reconciliation. He offered himself on the altar of the cross not to the devil, but to the triune God, and he did so for all with regard to the sufficiency of the price, but only for the elect with regard to its efficacy, because he brought about salvation only for the predestined."

This distinction, which became a foundational framework for both medieval theologians and Protestant scholastics remains a major theological battleground over the exact meaning of "sufficiency". Proponents of hypothetical universalism, such as John Davenant, argue that Lombard and later medieval giants like Thomas Aquinas affirmed an "ordained" or actual sufficiency. They claim that God willed Christ's death to be a universal remedy that objectively made satisfaction for the sins of all humanity, though its saving benefits are conditionally applied through faith. To support this, they point to Aquinas's description of Christ's Passion as a "superabundant satisfaction" for the entire human race, and his view that the merit of Christ’s death is a universal cause of salvation extending sufficiently to all.

Conversely, strict particularists argue that the formula represents only a "bare" or intrinsic sufficiency of infinite worth but no universal intent. In their view, Christ's death possesses infinite abstract value due to his divine person but was never intentionally ordained or designed by God to pay the penalty for the non-elect. Particularist scholars offer as evidence Aquinas's own defense of the eucharistic consecration formula ("for you and for many"), which he interpreted as referring specifically to the elect, comprising elect Jews ("for you") and elect Gentiles ("for many") rather than all humanity without exception. Critics of this particularist shift, however, argue that restricting the formula's sufficiency to the elect deprives the universal offer of the gospel of its genuine value and comfort.

=== The Early Reformation ===
The first generation of Protestant Reformers, including Martin Luther, Ulrich Zwingli, Heinrich Bullinger, Wolfgang Musculus, and John Calvin, wrote prior to the late sixteenth-century controversies that explicitly formalized the "extent of the atonement" as a distinct dogmatic debate. These early theologians primarily operated within a classical medieval framework, utilizing the traditional distinction between Christ's sufficient satisfaction for all and its efficient application to the elect to reconcile universal biblical invitations with particular election. Modern historical theologians disagree on how to locate these early Reformers within the later debate.

Proponents of hypothetical universalism argue that the first-generation Reformers affirmed a universal, objective vicarious satisfaction. To support this, they highlight statements by Bullinger describing Christ's death as an expiation for the sins of all ages, Musculus's defense of a universal redemption, and Calvin's explicit comments that Christ suffered for the sins of the whole world and "generally for all without exception". From this perspective, the early Reformers held that Christ paid the price for all human sin, with salvation rendered ineffectual only by human unbelief.

Conversely, defenders of definite atonement argue that the early Reformers did not systematically address or advocate for a universal design in the cross. They contend that the Reformers' universal language was either pastoral, non-distributive, or aimed at contrasting the Gnostic or Jewish boundaries with the universal reach of the gospel to all classes and nations. Particularist scholars argue that the Reformers' robust commitments to unconditional election, union with Christ, and the inseparability of Christ's satisfaction and intercession logically align their theology with definite atonement. In this view, Christ's death was not designed to create a hypothetical possibility of salvation for all, but to actually secure redemption for those He represented.

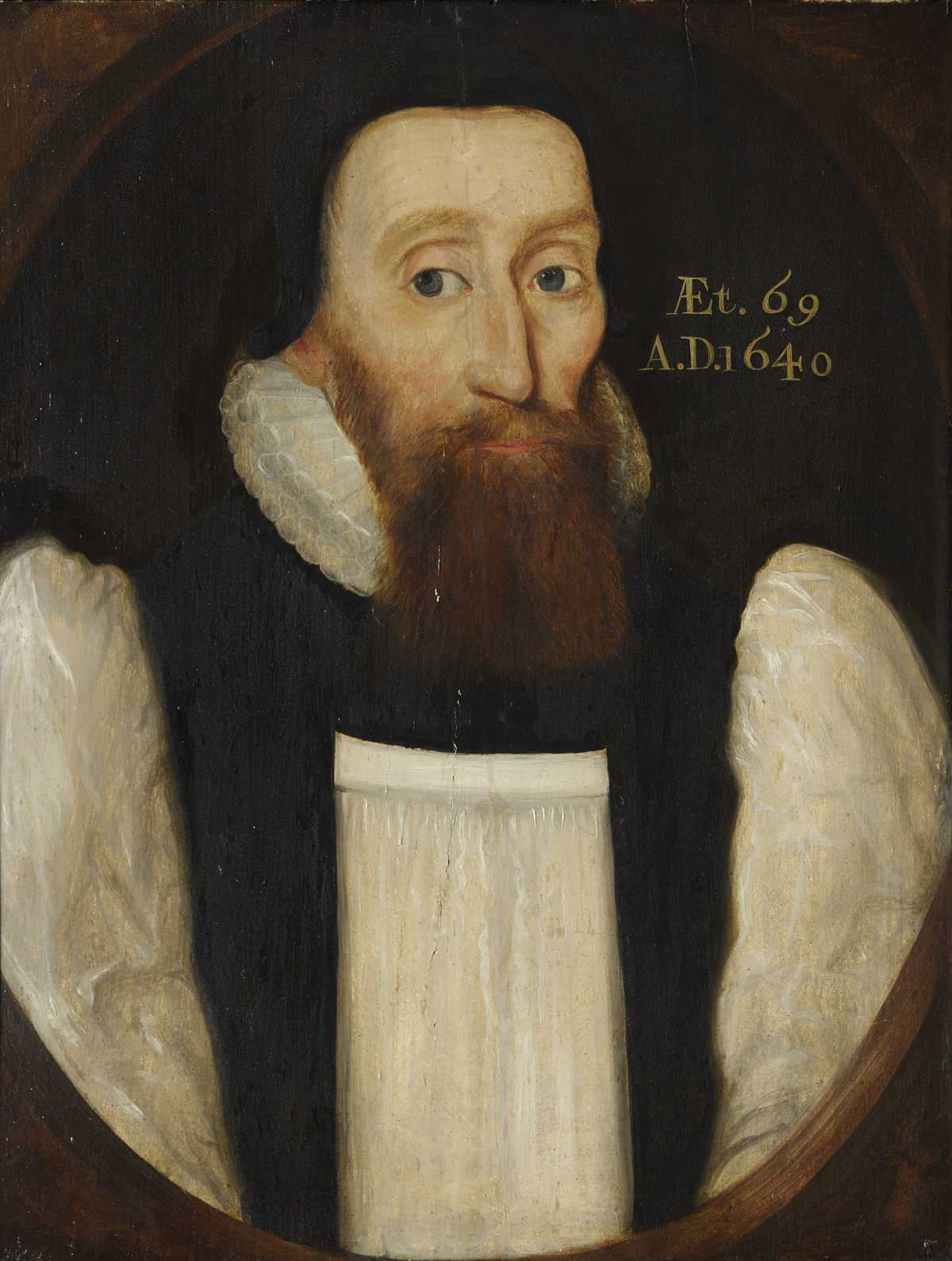
John Davenant (1572–1641), member of the English Delegation to Dort and Bishop of Salisbury, who held to Hypothetical Universalism.

=== The Synod of Dort (1618–1619) ===
During the international Synod of Dort, convened to resolve the Arminian controversy, the extent and intention of Christ’s death emerged as the most hotly contested issue. While strict particularists sought to confessionally mandate a limited atonement, several prominent delegates actively defended hypothetical universalism, this faction was led by members of the British delegation including John Davenant and Samuel Ward, and the Bremen delegation including Matthias Martinius and Ludwig Crocius.

Proponents of hypothetical universalism argue that the final Canons of Dort were drafted with deliberate breadth to accommodate their views. Specifically, under the Second Head of Doctrine (Article 8), the synod declared that God willed Christ to efficaciously redeem the elect alone. Historical theologians note that the inclusion of the word efficaciter functioned as a deliberate compromise. Because the Canons specified that only the efficacious or saving application of the atonement was limited to the elect, a back door was left open. This allowed hypothetical universalists to subscribe to the Canons in good faith, as they fully agreed on a limited efficacy while still maintaining an ineffectual universal sufficiency for all humanity.

However, strict particularists and several modern historians push back against this reading, arguing that the Canons of Dort are functionally particularist and were designed to restrict the salvific intent of the cross to the elect alone. They contend that interpreting the Canons as a endorsement of hypothetical universalism stretches the historical text, noting that subsequent continental Reformed synods routinely fought against the spread of universal grace. Furthermore, they highlight that the Reformed orthodox had to wait until the Formula Consensus Helvetica of 1675 for a confession that explicitly and systematically excluded all forms of hypothetical universalism.

Nonetheless, because Dort's final statements left these specific debates undecided, and because prominent hypothetical universalists signed the document without retracting their views, the synod is widely recognized as having preserved hypothetical universalism as an orthodox trajectory within the Reformed tradition.

== Bibliography ==
- Allen, David L. (1 June 2016). The Extent of the Atonement: A Historical and Critical Review. B&H Publishing Group. ISBN 9781433643934.
- Clifford, Alan C. (26 April 1990). Atonement and Justification, English Evangelical Theology 1640-1790: An Evaluation. Oxford University Press. ISBN 9780198261957.
- Crisp, Oliver D. (1 September 2014). Deviant Calvinism: Broadening Reformed Theology. Fortress Press. ISBN 9781451486131.
- Gibson, David; Gibson, Jonathan; et al. (J. I. Packer, Henri A. Blocher, Sinclair B. Ferguson, Paul Helm, Robert Letham, John Piper, Thomas R. Schreiner, Carl R. Trueman, Raymond A. Blacketer, Amar Djaballah, Lee Gatiss, Matthew S. Harmon, Michael A. G. Haykin, David S. Hogg, Donald Macleod, Alec Motyer, Daniel Strange, Stephen J. Wellum, Garry J. Williams, Paul R. Williamson) (30 Nov 2013). From Heaven He Came and Sought Her: Definite Atonement in Historical, Biblical, Theological, and Pastoral Perspective. Crossway. ISBN 9781433524028.
- Jones, Mark; Haykin, Michael A. G.; et al. (John V. Fesko, Crawford Gribben, Carl R. Trueman, Jonathan D. Moore, Alan D. Strange, Robert J. McKelvey, Mark A. Herzer, Hunter Powell, C. Jeffrey Robinson, Joel R. Beeke) (20 Jul 2011). Drawn into Controversie: Reformed Theological Diversity and Debates Within Seventeenth-Century British Puritanism. Reformed Historical Theology. Vol. 17. Vandenhoeck & Ruprecht. ISBN 9783647569451.
- Lynch, Michael J. (2021). John Davenant's Hypothetical Universalism: A Defense of Catholic and Reformed Orthodoxy. Oxford University Press. ISBN 9780197555149.
- Muller, Richard A. (15 November 2012). Calvin and the Reformed Tradition: On the Work of Christ and the Order of Salvation. Baker Publishing Group. ISBN 9780801048708.
