= Friedrich Adolph Lampe =

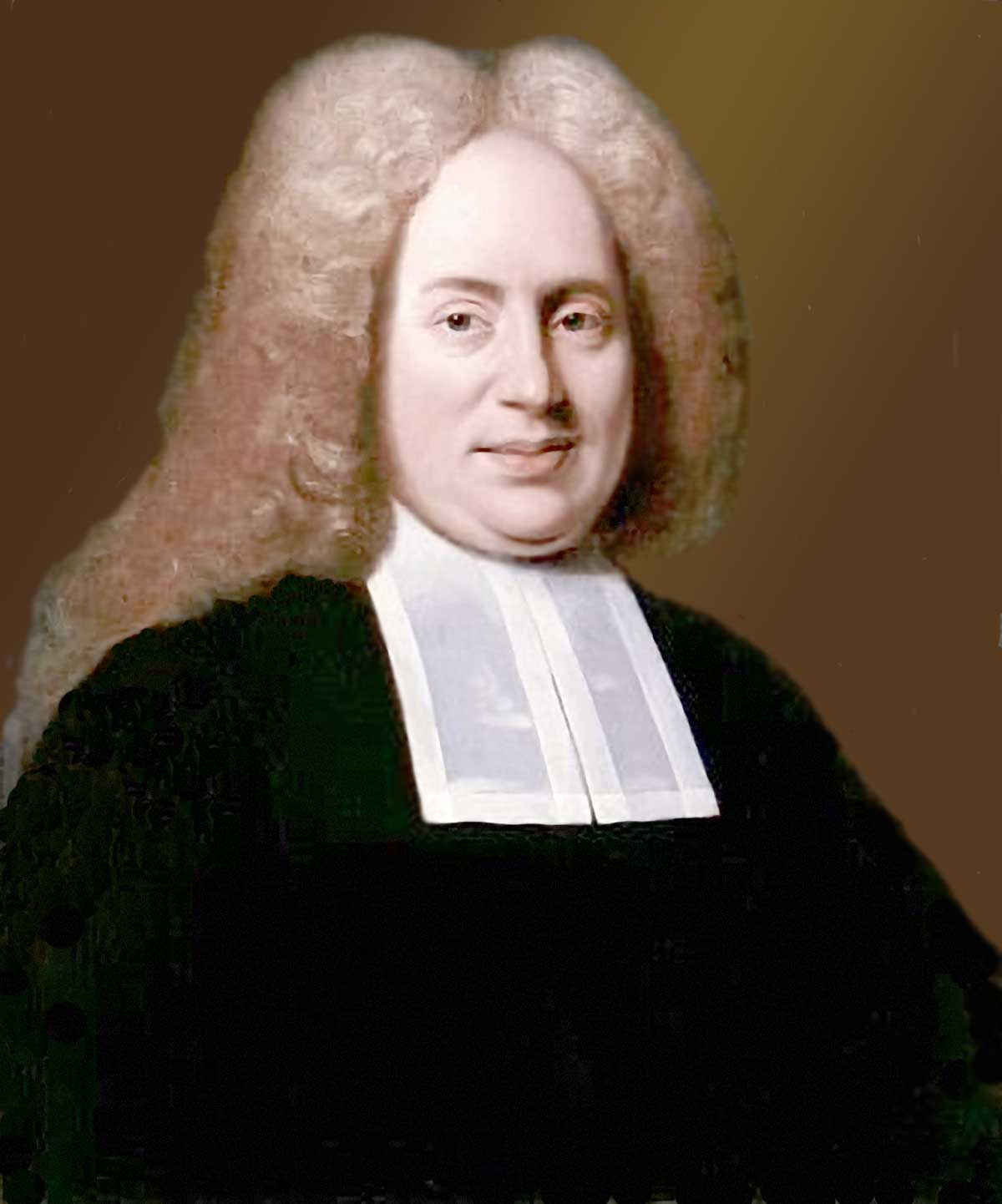
Friedrich Adolf Lampe

Friedrich Adolph Lampe (18 February 1683 – 8 December 1729) was a German Pietist pastor, theologian and professor of dogmatics. He was a Cocceian, and follower of Johannes d'Outrein. He is known as the first Pietist leader from a Calvinist rather than Lutheran background.

== Biography ==
Lampe was born in Detmold in 1683. He received his education in Bremen from 1698 to 1702 and then enrolled at the University of Franeker, where he graduated in 1703. He was appointed pastor at Weeze near Cleves in 1703, and subsequently was appointed pastor in Duisburg in 1706 and Bremen in 1709. On 15 April 1720 he was appointed professor of theology at Utrecht University, and also served as pastor of St. Ansgar's Church.

He died in Bremen.

== Philosophy and works ==
Lampe was especially influenced by pietism and saw inner life development as very important, and he was also a strong believer in the divinity of the church. He attempted to revive the Covenant theology of Johannes Cocceius and was a follower of Johannes d'Outrein. His most prominent work was Geheimniß des Gnadenbunds, dem großen Bundesgott zu Ehren und allen heylbegierigen Seelen zur Erbauung geöffnet, published in six volumes from 1712. In 1726 he published Synopsis historiae sacrae. He also published a number of catechisms; among them were Milch der Wahrheit, nach Anleitung des Heidelberge Katechismus (1718), Einleitung zu dem Geheimnis des Gnadenbundes, and Delineatio theologae activae, considered to be the "first system of ethics derived from federal theology".
