= Samuel Hoard =

- Born: 1599; London, England
- Died: 15 February 1657 (aged 57–58)
- Occupation: Clergyman

Samuel Hoard (1599–1658) was an English clergyman and controversialist in the Arminian interest. He is credited with the first worked-out attack on Calvinistic doctrine by an English churchman.

== Life ==
He was born in London in 1599, and became either a clerk or a chorister of All Souls' College, Oxford, in 1614. He matriculated on 10 October 1617, and migrated to St Mary Hall, where he graduated B.A. 20 April 1618, and commenced M.A. in 1621.

He became chaplain to Robert Rich, 2nd Earl of Warwick, who presented him in 1626 to the rectory of Moreton, near Ongar, Essex. On 15 June 1630 he was admitted B.D. at Oxford. In 1637 he was collated to the prebend of Willesden in the church of St Paul. He died on 15 February 1657 O.S., and was buried in the chancel of Moreton Church. Wood says he was "well read in the fathers and schoolmen, was a good disputant and preacher, a zealous Calvinist in the beginning, but a greater Arminian afterwards".

== Works ==
His Gods Love to Mankind; manifested by disproving his absolute Decree for their Damnation provoked several answers. John Davenant was, according to Lee Gatiss, influential in replying to the Arminian positions of Hoard and Henry Mason. Some pieces by Mason were included in Gods Love to Mankind. There was also a reply from Moïse Amyraut, and Hoard's work is referred to by Nathaniel Culverwel. A posthumous work of William Twisse, with Henry Jeanes and John Goodwin, also replied explicitly.

== Notes and references ==
This article incorporates text from a publication now in the public domain: "Hoard, Samuel". Dictionary of National Biography. London: Smith, Elder & Co. 1885–1900.
