= Johannes d'Outrein =

17th-century Dutch preacher and theologician

Johannes d'Outrein

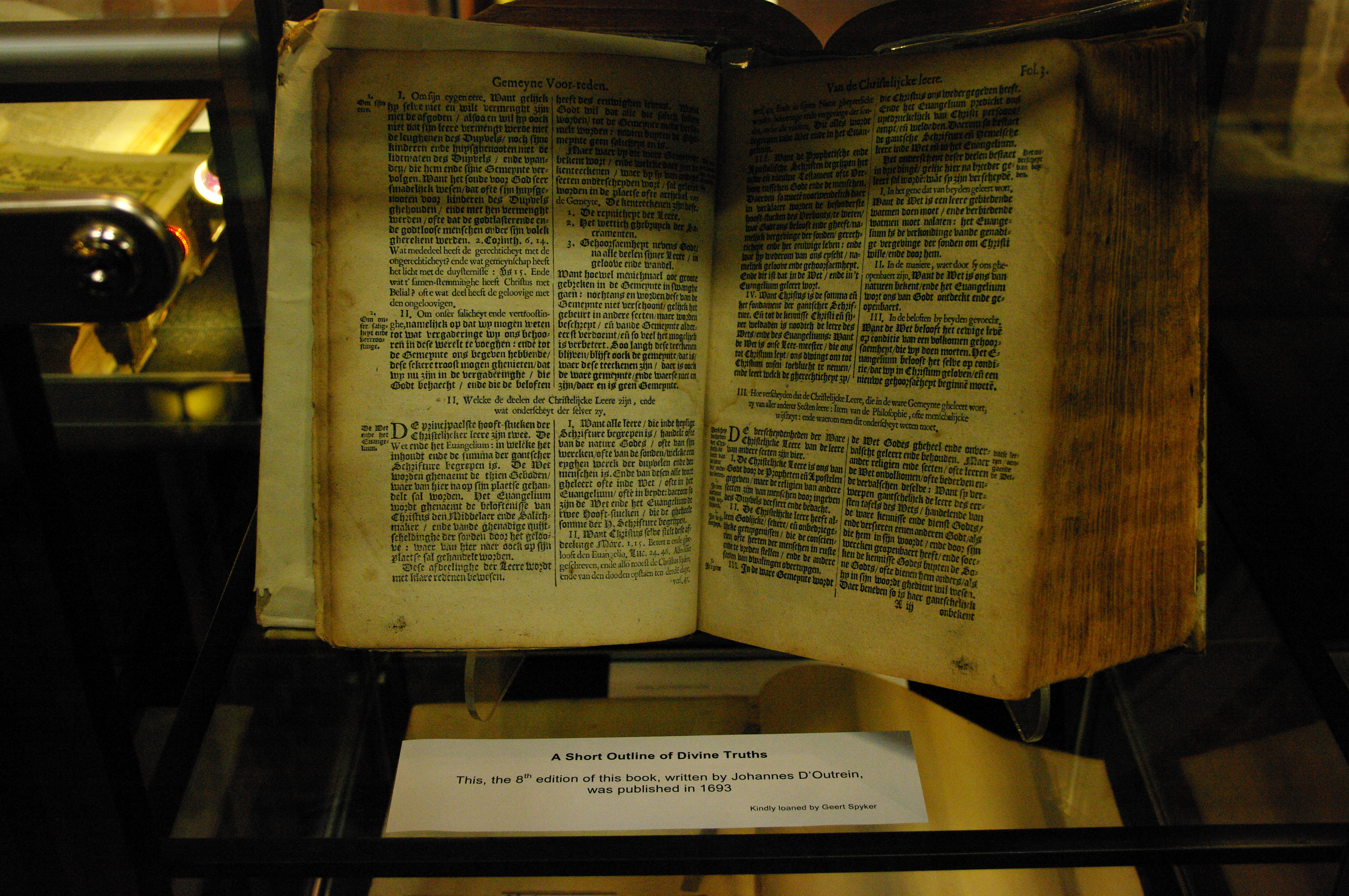
A 1693 work of d'Outrein in Saint George's Cathedral, Perth

Johannes d'Outrein (Jan d'Outrein, 17 October 1662 in Middelburg – 24 February 1722 in Amsterdam) was a Dutch preacher, writer and author of evangelical theological works. He studied in Franeker, where he earned his doctorate in 1682. He was a preacher in Oost-Zanen in 1685, Franeker in 1687, Arnhem in 1691, Dordrecht in 1703 and Amsterdam in 1708, where he died in 1722. He was a prominent exponent of the Cocceian movement, and Friedrich Adolph Lampe was one of his disciples. Outrein believed that God was "the alliance God of the Netherlands, of his chosen people, who are gathered there and live there".

== Works ==
Johannes d'Outrein authored over 50 works. Some of his most notable works are as follows:

- Gods Tabernakel onder de menschen ende de Heerlykheid des Soons Gods (over Joh. 1. 14.) mitsgaders het heilig sabbath- en jubeljaar (over Lev. xxv. 1–13.). Amsterdam 1701
- De redenen van vrees en hoop, Gerard Borstius. Amsterdam 1705
- Roosendaalsche vermaaklykheden of Wegwyser door de Heerlykheit Roosendaal. Amsterdam 1700, 1712, 1718
- Schrifftmässige Erklärung der Evangelischen Parabolen, Übersetzung aus dem Lateinischen und Niederländischen. Franckfurt und Leipzig 1717
- Gesangen of nuttige bestedingen der afgebroken uren. Amsterdam 1717
- De geestelijke tempelbouw, ter gelegentheid van de Inwijdinge van de Herboude Kerk te Ransdorp. Amsterdam 1720
- Het Gouden Kleinoot Van de Leere der Waarheit Die naar die Godsaligheid is; Vervattet in den Heidelbergschen Catechismus. J. Boom, Amsterdam 1719.
- Korte Schets der godlyke Waarheden, Soo als die in haare natuurlyke ordre te samen geschakelt zijn. Amsterdam 1718.
