= Charles Herle =

English theologian

Charles Herle (1598–1659) was a prominent English theologian, of moderate Presbyterian views.

Herle graduated from Exeter College, Oxford with an M.A. in 1618. He was vicar of Winwick, Lancashire, from 1626.

In a controversy with Henry Ferne, a Royalist, Herle insisted, against divine right theory, that a monarch's sovereignty was mediated by the people, rather than coming directly from God. It has been suggested that this work marks the beginning of a transition from theories of mixed government to the doctrine of separation of powers. His 1643 work on The independency on scriptures of the independency of churches provoked reaction from New England, and controversy with Samuel Rutherford.

Parliament appointed Herle as Prolocutor of the Westminster Assembly on 22 July 1646, after the death of William Twisse. The Westminster Confession of Faith of 1646 was drawn up by Herle with others, drafting being assigned at one point to a small group of Herle, Edward Reynolds and Matthew Newcomen.

== Works ==
- A payre of compasses for church and state (1642)
- The independency on scriptures of the independency of churches (1643)
- Ahab's fall by his prophets flatteries (1644)
- A Fuller Answer to a Treatise written by Dr. Ferne (1642)

== Notes ==
Church of England titles
| Preceded by William Twisse | Prolocutor of the Westminster Assembly; 1646–1649 | Succeeded by None |
