= William Creed (priest) =

English clergyman and academic

William Creed (1614?-1663) was an English clergyman and academic, Regius Professor of Divinity at Oxford from 1660.

== Life ==
The son of John Creed, he was a native of Reading, Berkshire. He was elected a scholar of St John's College, Oxford, in 1631, proceeded B.A., was elected a fellow of his college, commenced M. A. in 1639, and graduated B.D. in 1646. During the First English Civil War he was a royalist, and preached several sermons before the king and parliament at Oxford.

He was expelled from his fellowship and from the university in 1648, but was able to hold the rectory of Codford St Mary, Wiltshire. At the Restoration he was created D.D.

Gilbert Sheldon persuaded Charles II to prefer Arminian William Creed to the Regius Chair of Divinity.

Creed was appointed in June 1660 to the regius professorship of divinity at Oxford, with a canonry of Christ Church, Oxford. In July 1660 he became archdeacon of Wilts; he was also rector of Stockton, Wiltshire.

Creed died at Oxford on 19 July 1663.

== Works ==
Besides several sermons, he published: The Refuter refuted; or Dr Hen. Hammond's Ἐκτενέστερον defended against the impertinent cavils of Mr Hen. Jeanes, London, 1660, supporting Henry Hammond against Henry Jeanes.

== Notes and references ==
- This article incorporates text from a publication now in the public domain: "Creed, William". Dictionary of National Biography. London: Smith, Elder & Co. 1885–1900.

=== Sources ===
Tyacke, Nicholas (1997). The History of the University of Oxford. Vol. IV: Seventeenth-Century Oxford. Oxford: Oxford University Press.

=== External links ===
Academic offices
Preceded by Robert Sanderson	Regius Professor of Divinity at Oxford; 1661—1663	Succeeded by Richard Allestree
