= Francis Mason (priest) =

English churchman and author

Francis Mason (c.1566–1621) was an English churchman, archdeacon of Norfolk and author of Of the Consecration of the Bishops in the Church of England (1613), a defence of the Church of England and the first serious rebuttal of the Nag's Head Fable put about as denigration of Matthew Parker and Anglican orders.

== Life ==
The son of poor parents, and brother, according to John Walker, of Henry Mason, he was born in county Durham about 1566. He matriculated at Oriel College, Oxford, on 10 May 1583, and already noted for his learning, was elected probationer fellow of Merton College towards the end of 1586. He proceeded B.A. from Brasenose College on 27 January 1587, M.A. from Merton College on 4 July 1590, and B.D. on 7 July 1597.

He incurred the displeasure of William James, dean of Christ Church, Oxford and the vice-chancellor of the university, in 1591, for having said unseemly words against Thomas Aubrey, who had recently made his supplication for the degree of B.D. Mason was deprived of the liberties of the university for a year; but regarding his sentence as an unwarrantable precedent, he appealed to congregation, and a difference of opinion arose between the pro-vice-chancellor Thomas Glasier and the proctors, who were willing to admit the appeal. On 23 November 1599 he was presented to the rectory of Sudbourn, with the chapel of Orford in Suffolk.

In 1613 he was chaplain to George Abbot, archbishop of Canterbury, according to Charles Dodd. Mason was installed archdeacon of Norfolk on 18 December 1619. He appears to have had the archdeaconry bestowed on him at an earlier date (probably 1614), for his defence of the Church of England, but his right was contested. A petition from Mason's wife for the archdeaconry was backed by Abbot and John Williams, bishop of Lincoln.

Mason died in 1621, and was buried at Orford on 21 December (par. reg.) His widow erected a marble monument to his memory in the chancel of Orford Church, later moved to the north transept. In it Mason is represented kneeling in his M.A. gown, with scarf and ruff. During his rectorship Mason built the parsonage house at Orford. By his wife, born Elizabeth Price, Mason had three children. The baptisms of Elizabeth on 9 September 1604 and of Samuel on 4 May 1606 are recorded in the parish registers of Orford.

== Works ==
Mason is known for on vigorous defence of the authority of the church of England, which earned him the title of 'Vindex Ecclesiae Anglicanae.' In 1613, with the encouragement of Abbot, he published his book, Of the Consecration of the Bishops in the Church of England, in which he introduced extracts from the records preserved at Lambeth Palace, with a view to proving the validity of the consecration of the Protestant bishops, and especially that of Matthew Parker. He was the first to refute the widely spread and generally credited 'Nag's Head' story. The book is written in the form of dialogue between Philodox, a seminary priest, and Orthodox, a minister of the church of England. In 1616 Anthony Champney published at Douay an answer to Mason, entitled A Treatise of the Vocation of Bishops and other Ecclesiastical Ministers, which he dedicated to Abbot. He republished it in Latin in 1618. Champney was Mason's strongest antagonist; but other Catholic writers put forth works against him, principally Thomas Fitzherbert, Henry Fitzsimon, and Matthew Kellison.

The attacks induced Mason to reissue his book in 1618, and to prepare an enlarged version of it in Latin, with answers to his critics. The manuscript was completed in 1620; it was called De Ministerio Anglicano, but his health failing him, the publication was not proceeded with in his lifetime. At the desire of Abbot, Mason's Latin manuscript was taken in hand by Nathaniel Brent, who issued it in 1625, under the title of Vindiciae Ecclesiae Anglicanae. It was reprinted in 1638, In 1728 an English translation of the Latin edition, under the title of A Vindication of the Church of England, was published, with a lengthy introduction by John Lindsay, in which there is an account of the whole controversy. Lindsay's edition was reprinted in 1734 and 1778.

Other published works by Mason are:

- 'The Authority of the Church in making Canons and Constitutions,' London, 1607; Oxford, 1634; London, 1705 (with a dedicatory epistle by George Hickes, and a recommendation by Henry Compton; London, 1707; appended to Lindsay's edition of the 'Vindication,' London, 1728; in vol. iv. of Christopher Wordsworth's Christian Institutes, London, 1837.
- 'Two Sermons preached in the King's Court,' in January 1620 (No. 1, Upon David's Adultery; No. 2, Upon David's Politick Practices), London, 1621; 1747 (republished by Lindsay).

A pamphlet entitled The Validity of the Ordination of the Ministers of the Reformed Churches beyond the Seas, maintained against the Romanists, with Mason's name on the title-page, and a brief declaration premised, by John Dury, is considered spurious by Lindsay. It was published in a volume of Certain Briefe Treatises, written by Diverse learned Men Oxford, 1641. In a letter from George Davenport to William Sancroft, January 1655, among the Tanner MSS. in the Bodleian Library, the authorship is ascribed to John Overall, who is also credited in a later letter with a large share in the Vindication.
