= Abraham Scultetus =

German theologian (1566–1625)

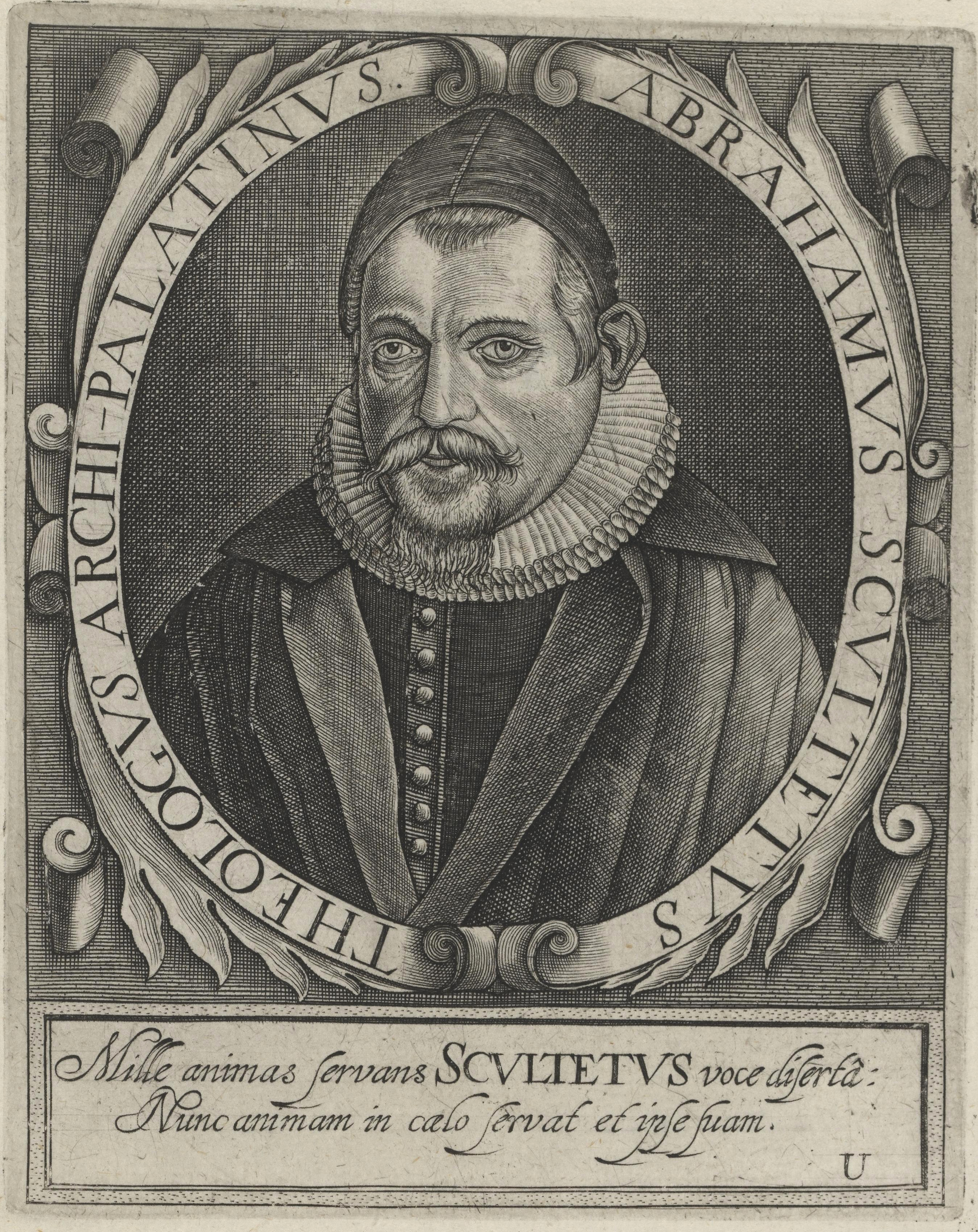
Abraham Scultetus

Abraham Scultetus (24 August 1566 – 24 October 1625) was a German professor of theology, and the court preacher for the Elector of the Palatinate Frederick V.

== Biography ==
=== Early life ===
Abraham was born in Grünberg in Silesia (after 1945 Zielona Góra, Poland) and was brought up as a Lutheran. He began his studies in theology in 1588 in Wittenberg and then in 1590 in Heidelberg. When he became Reformed and gave up his Lutheranism is unknown. By 1595 he was working for the Elector of the Palatinate, who at that time was Frederick IV. He continued to serve the churches of the Palatinate and accompanied Frederick V on his honeymoon with his wife Elisabeth, daughter of King James I of England, in 1613. He served Frederick V as his court preacher and also became a professor of Old Testament in Heidelberg in 1618. He also apparently helped introduce the Reformed Church order used in the Palatinate into the Hanau district under Count Phillip II as well as setting men as ministers in Berlin to serve the Reformed church there in 1614.

=== Synod of Dort ===
Scultetus was chosen as a representative of the Palatinate for the Synod of Dort, and was prominent there. He preached a sermon on Psalm 122 on 15 December, and also gave an address on the certainty of grace. Some held that Scultetus was the most prominent foreigner at the Synod along with George Carleton, Bishop of Llandaff from England. He agreed with the condemnation of the Remonstrants and the doctrinal decrees of the Synod.

=== Role with the Winter King ===
On 26 August 1619 Frederick V, the Elector of the Palatinate, was elected King of Bohemia. If he took the crown there would be war, that was known and certain. Abraham Scultetus, as the court preacher, had significant influence on Frederick and urged him to accept the crown of Bohemia in order to spread Protestantism. He even preached a sermon from Revelation encouraging Frederick to take the throne. Scultetus would accompany Frederick to Bohemia and serve him there. Scultetus did try to install the Reformed church order on the highly Lutheran area of Bohemia, and it caused some problems. In the end, the Emperor overcame Frederick and he was forced to flee. Scultetus accompanied Frederick back to Heidelberg, but war soon found them there as well. Scultetus was forced to flee again. This time he went to Emden. He served as a preacher there for the remaining years of his life. He died in 1625 at Emden.

== Theology ==
Abraham Scultetus was a Calvinist. He held to the doctrines of predestination and agreed with the Synod of Dort and their doctrinal deliverances. Scultetus was a Supralapsarian, and taught that view from his position as professor at Heidelberg. Scultetus denied the imputation of the active obedience of Christ following the teaching of Piscator. This position was controversial and rejected by many other Reformed theologians of his day. Scultetus was also against images of Christ, and he took them down everywhere he went, even when it caused problems with the populace as in Bohemia.
