= Thomas Winniffe =

Bishop of Lincoln

Thomas Winniffe (1576–1654) was an English churchman, the Bishop of Lincoln from 1642 to 1646.

== Early life ==
He was born and baptised at Sherborne, Dorset, in 1576, the son of John Winniffe (1540?-1630), who was buried on 28 September 1630 in Lambourne church, Essex. He was educated at Sherborne and matriculated from Exeter College, Oxford, on 22 Feb. 1594, and elected fellow in 1595; he graduated B.A. on 12 July 1598, M.A. on 17 May 1601, B.D. on 27 March 1610, and D.D. on 5 July 1610. In August 1605 he was one of those who disputed in moral philosophy before James I, his queen Anne of Denmark, and Henry Frederick, Prince of Wales on the occasion of their visit to Oxford.

== Ministry ==
On 5 May 1608 he was admitted to the rectory of Willingale Doe, Essex, and on 15 June following to that of Lambourne in the same county, and on 30 June 1609 he resigned his fellowship at Exeter, having livings above the statutable value.

After Prince Henry's death Winniffe became chaplain to Prince Charles. However, on 7 April 1622, when the Spaniards were overrunning the Electorate of the Palatinate, Winniffe preached a sermon denouncing Gondomar, and comparing Spinola with the devil. Sent to the Tower of London, Winniffe repented and appealed to the Spanish and imperial ambassadors, whose intercession caused his release a few days later. On 17 September 1624 he was nominated dean of Gloucester, and was installed on 10 November. He remained chaplain to Charles after his accession, and on 8 April 1631 was nominated dean of St Paul's in succession to John Donne, who bequeathed him a picture; he was also one of the three to whom Donne is said to have left his religious manuscripts. The canons elected Winniffe dean of St Paul's on 18 April; on 15 March 1634 he took the oath as an ecclesiastical commissioner.

== Episcopate ==
When Bishop John Williams was promoted from Bishop of Lincoln to Archbishop of York on 4 December 1641, Winniffe was selected to succeed him. Although the King supposedly thereby intended to gratify parliament (on the ground of Winniffe's supposed Puritan tendencies), on 30 December Francis Rous moved in the House of Commons for the postponement of Winniffe's consecration. A mob also destroyed Winniffe's house in Westminster, although its leader, Sir Richard Wiseman, was killed. Nonetheless, Winniffe was elected on 5 January 1642, and consecrated on 6 February; he retained the deanery of St Paul's, but resigned his livings in Essex.

The outbreak of the First English Civil War disturbed his possession of his see, though according to his own account he was always at Buckden Palace and submitted to parliamentary ordinances. He was deprived of his see by Parliament on 9 October 1646, as episcopacy was abolished for the duration of the Commonwealth and the Protectorate. In November 1646, all bishops' lands were vested in trustees for the benefit of the commonwealth, and Winniffe retired to Lambourne. Early in 1654, on his petition to Oliver Cromwell, his arrears were paid up to November 1646. During his retirement, Winniffe assisted Brian Walton in the preparation of the 'Polyglot Bible.'

== Death and legacy ==
Winniffe died at Lambourne on 29 September 1654, and was buried within the altar-rails of the church. He was unmarried, and gave the advowson of Lambourne, which he had purchased, to his nephew, Peter Mews. His episcopate at Lincoln remained vacant for six years, until the election of Robert Sanderson in 1660.

Church of England titles
Preceded by John Williams	Bishop of Lincoln; 1642–1646	Succeeded by Vacancy, then Robert Sanderson in 1660
