= Samuel Ward (scholar) =

English cleric and academic (1572–1643)

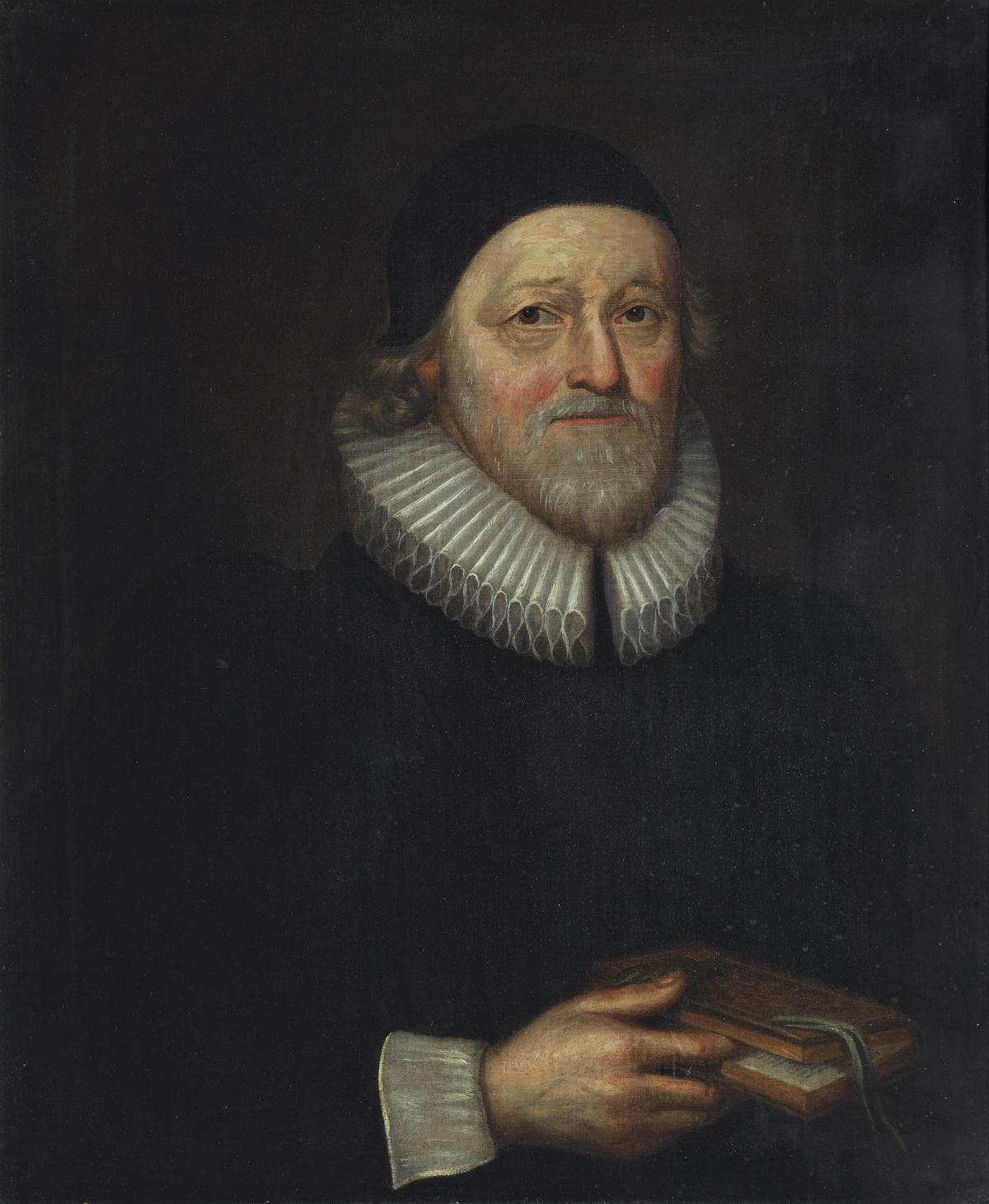

Samuel Ward (1572–1643) was an English academic and a master at the University of Cambridge. He served as one of the delegates from the Church of England to the Synod of Dort.

== Life ==
He was born at Bishop Middleham, County Durham. He was a scholar of Christ's College, Cambridge, where in 1592 he was admitted B.A. In 1595 he was elected to a fellowship at Emmanuel, and in the following year proceeded M.A. In 1599 he was chosen a Fellow of the new Sidney Sussex College.

William Perkins entrusted to him for publication his treatise, Problema de Romanae Fidei ementito Catholicismo; Ward published it with a preface addressed to James I, to whom he was shortly afterwards appointed chaplain. Ward was one of the scholars involved with the translation and preparation of the King James Bible. He served in the "Second Cambridge Company" charged with translating the Apocrypha. During this time he made the acquaintance of James Ussher, whom he assisted in patristic researches.

In 1610, Sidney elected him to the mastership of the college and he was created D.D., having been admitted B.D. in 1603. He was now recognised as a moderate with Calvinist views, strongly attached to the Church of England; Thomas Fuller, who was his pupil at Sidney Sussex College, found him consistent. In 1615 Ward was made prebendary of Wells Cathedral, and also archdeacon of Taunton. On 21 February 1618 he was appointed prebendary of York, and in the following year was one of the English delegates to the synod of Dort. Letters addressed to him there from Thomas Wallis, Gerard Herbert, Joseph Hall, and Arthur Lake survive. Simon Episcopius found him the most learned member of the synod.

In 1623 he was appointed Lady Margaret's Professor of Divinity in the university. He was one of the licensors of George Carleton's book against Richard Montagu's 'Appeale'; it was later suppressed by William Laud; and he appears to have himself taken part in the attack on Montagu, whose chaplain he had at one time been. He concurred in the censure of a sermon preached at Great St. Mary's by one Adams in 1627, advocating the practice of confession (Canterburies Doom, pp. 159–92); and when Isaac Dorislaus was appointed lecturer on history at Cambridge, he welcomed him. He appears also to have written in reply to the anti-Calvinistic treatise God's Love to Mankind by Henry Mason and Samuel Hoard. His college chapel remained unconsecrated.

When the First English Civil War broke out his sense of duty, as involved in his sworn allegiance to the crown, would not allow him to take the Solemn League and Covenant, and in consequence he became obnoxious to the presbyterian majority. In 1643, along with many others, he was imprisoned in St. John's College until, his health giving way, he was permitted to retire in Sidney Sussex College, his own college. He was attended during his last days by Seth Ward. On 30 August 1643, while attending the chapel service, he was seized with illness, an attack which terminated fatally on the 7th of the following September. His obsequies were formally celebrated on 30 November, when a funeral oration was pronounced in Great St. Mary's by Henry Molle, the public orator, and a sermon preached by Ward's friend and admirer, Ralph Brownrig. He was interred in the college chapel.

Other pupils were Edward Montagu, 2nd Earl of Manchester and Richard Holdsworth, and he supported both Abraham Wheelocke and Simon Birkbeck. Other friends included John Williams, John Davenant, Thomas James, and Sir Simonds D'Ewes.

== King James Bible manuscript ==
In 2015, Professor Jeffrey Alan Miller of Montclair State University announced the discovery of an early draft manuscript of a portion of the King James Bible, specifically 1 Esdras and Wisdom 3–4, among Ward's papers in the archives of Sidney Sussex College, Cambridge. Written in Ward's own handwriting and dating from 1604 to 1608, the manuscript shows Ward crafting portions of the Apocrypha, with translation notes in Latin, Greek, and Hebrew. The manuscript sheds light on the translation process used for the King James Bible, notably that many portions were at least initially translated independently and not collaboratively as was originally thought.

Prior to Miller, the existence of Ward's draft of 1 Esdras had been previously noted in the early nineteenth century by the librarian and scholar Henry Todd (priest), in his biography of Brian Walton (bishop). Todd writes, in the course of his survey of British Biblical scholarship in the period before Walton: "Dr Samuel Ward, the Lady Margaret's Professor of Divinity at Cambridge, was the constant correspondent of Archbishop Usher upon subjects of biblical and oriental criticism. Among his curious Adversaria in the library of Sidney College, of which he was Master, there remain the proof of his attention in translating the first book of Esdras, which probably was the sole part of the Apocrypha assigned to him; and a collation of ancient Versions upon the beginning of Genesis." Todd, however, never specified the exact notebook in question that contained Ward's draft of 1 Esdras. He also overlooked the existence in the same notebook of the draft of Wisdom 3–4.

== Works ==
- Gratia discriminans: Concio ad Clerum habita Cantabrigiae, 12 January 1625, London 1626.
- Magnetis reductorium Theologicum Tropologicum, in quo ejus novus, verus et supremus usus indicatur, London, 1637; the same translated by Harbottle Grimston, London, 1640. According to Cotton Mather, this was actually written by Samuel Ward of Ipswich.
- De Baptismatis Infantilis vi et efficacia Disceptatio, London, 1653.
- Opera nonnulla: Declamationes Theologicae, Tractatus de justificatione, Praelectiones de peccato originali. Edita a Setho Wardo. 2 pts., London, 1658.
- Letter to W. Harvey, M.D., relating to a petrified skull, in Specimens of the Hand writing of Harvey, edited by George Edward Paget, Cambridge 1849.
- 'The Diary Of Samuel Ward: A Translator Of The 1611 King James Bible', edited by John Wilson Cowart and M. M. Knappen, contains surviving pages of his diary running from 11 May 1595 to 1 July 1632.

Academic offices
Preceded by Francis Aldrich	Master of Sidney Sussex College, Cambridge; 1610–1643	Succeeded by Richard Minshull
