= Ludwig Crocius =

German Calvinist minister

Ludwig Crocius (also Ludovicus Crocius; 29 March 1586 – 7 December 1653 or 1655) was a German Calvinist minister. He was a delegate at the Synod of Dort and professor of theology and philosophy in Bremen.

== Background and career ==
Ludwig Crocius was born in Laasphe, the son of Paul Crocius (1551–1607). He was at one time tutor to the sons of the counts of Nassau-Dillenburg and Wittgenstein-Berleburg. From 1583, he was minister and Superintendent in Laasphe. Crocius was the author of a book of Protestant martyrology Groß Matyrbuch und Kirchenhistorien (1606). Johann Crocius was his younger brother. His grandfather Matthias Crocius (1479–1557) had been a minister in Zwickau, and was close to Martin Luther and Philipp Melanchthon.

Crocius studied at Herborn Academy, and then from 1603 studied theology at the University of Marburg where he graduated M.A. in 1604. On 5 September 1607 his father died, vacating his position as preacher and inspector of the county of Katzenelnbogen in Langenschwalbach—Crocius succeeded him, but in 1608 he asked for leave from Moritz of Hesse-Kassel for further study.

Crocius went to the universities in Bremen, Marburg and Basel. On 4 April 1609, he graduated D.D. in Basel, and travelled on to Geneva, in order to study there further. From Geneva, he returned to Bremen and the St. Martini church as first preacher and teacher of philosophy and theology professor at the Gymnasium Illustre, from 1610.

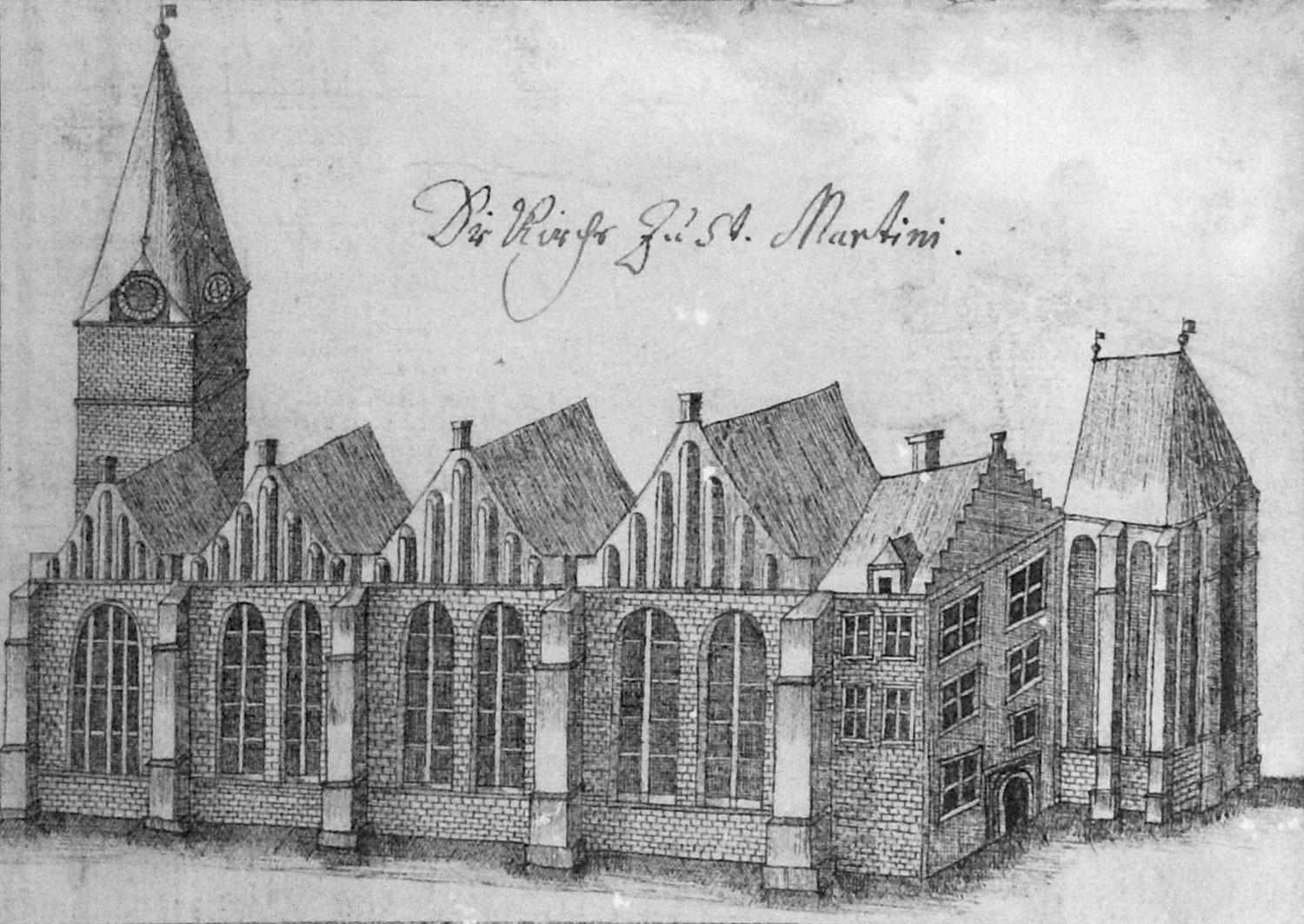
The St. Martini Church in Bremen in the 18th century.

He turned down later offers of positions made by John Sigismund, Elector of Brandenburg (1615) and the Landgrave Moritz of Hesse-Kassel (1618), and also a chance to become General superintendent for Silesia. From 1630 to 1639, and from 1647 to his death, he was a prorector at the High School Illustre. He corresponded with Samuel Hartlib and John Dury, and with Gerardus Vossius.

In 1651 Crocius suffered an attack of apoplexy, but he remained until 14 May 1652 at his post of preacher in the Liebfrauenkirche church. He taught at the Gymnasium Illustre up to his death, which occurred in Bremen.

== Synod of Dort ==
Crocius travelled to the 1618 Synod of Dort with Mathias Martinius and Heinrich Isselburg. The senate of Bremen required of its three delegates that they would represent a mild theological line going back to Philipp Melanchthon, as defined in the Consensus Bremensis of 1595 and corresponds to the local practices; Bremen for prudential reasons had signed up to the Augsburg Confession.

Crocius and Martinius were in the small group of Dort delegates who rejected limited atonement. Crocius made a public criticism of Johannes Bogermann who chaired the Synod, for his harshness towards the Remonstrants; and gave other clear signs of sympathy with Arminian views. The Bremen representatives, nevertheless, subscribed to the Canons of Dort. In practical terms they implied no restrictions or obligations for the church in Bremen, given that the conclusions of the Synod were given no confessional standing there. This was not without consequences, for Bremen's reputation among Calvinists.

== Controversy ==
He was attacked by the Lutheran Balthasar Mentzer in his Anti-Crocius of (1621).

After the Synod of Dort the arguments over predestination resonated in Bremen. The preacher of the St. Ansgarii Church, Philipp Caesar, was an advocate of the strict doctrine. Caesar preached along these lines to the local council. In 1624 he resigned his post and left Bremen, but both the St. Ansgari and St. Stephani churches strove to gain Caesar as preachers; but the appointment was rejected by the senate. Heinrich Isselburg, the preacher of the Liebfrauenkirche church, died on 29 March 1628 and it seemed that Caesar could take the vacant position. To prevent that Ludwig Crocius was appointed to the place.

Caesar then in 1628 was able to preach in the St. Martini, since this position had become free; now by the appointment. In 1630, however, Caesar again left the city, and finally converted to Catholicism. The situation in Breman resolved with Crocius, Conrad Bergius (1592–1642) at St. Ansgarii, and Balthasar Willius (1606–1656), preacher at the Liebfrauenkirche as representatives of the moderate teachings of Melanchthon, and on the other hand the High School rector Johann Combach, Henricus Flockenius at St. Remberti, and Petrus Carpenter at St. Stephani as representatives of the strict doctrine.

The debates at Dort still cast a long shadow, and in 1640, when Crocius was attacked as an Arminian by Hendrik Alting who had also participated, John Davenant and Joseph Hall intervened in the controversy to defend him.

== Works ==
Crocius was classed with the eirenicist writers of his time. He had a reputation as tolerant and moderate, and was on friendly terms with Calixtus at Helmstedt. His Antisocinismus Contractus (1639) attacked Socinians on the centenary of the death of Fausto Sozzini. The work may have been intended for pedagogical use with students.

He translated Basilius, and in 1617 published an edition of Ficino's De Religione Christiana. He was a prolific writer, with an estimated 71 publications. Syntagma sacrae Theologiae (1636) was a major work. Others were:

- Vier Tractaten van de Verstandicheit der Heyligen principelyk ghestelt teghens het boek P. Bertii van den Afval der Heyligen door Lud. Crocium (1615);
- Homo Calvinianus impie descriptus a Dr. Matth. Hoe Austriaco (1620), polemical;
- Examen falsae descriptionis Calvinistarum Hoeji IV disputatt. defensis (1621);
- Assertio Augustanae confessionis contra Mentzerum IV disputatt. (1621);
- Numerous shorter works against Robert Bellarmine and the Jesuits.

He wrote on the De Germania of Tacitus (1618) as a school work, and also the Idea viri boni hoc est octo et quadringenta Sixti sive Xisti sententiae quae vitae honestae et religiosae epitomen complectuntur (1618).
