= Robert Sanderson (theologian) =

English Anglican theologian and casuist

The Right Reverend Robert Sanderson
- Bishop of Lincoln
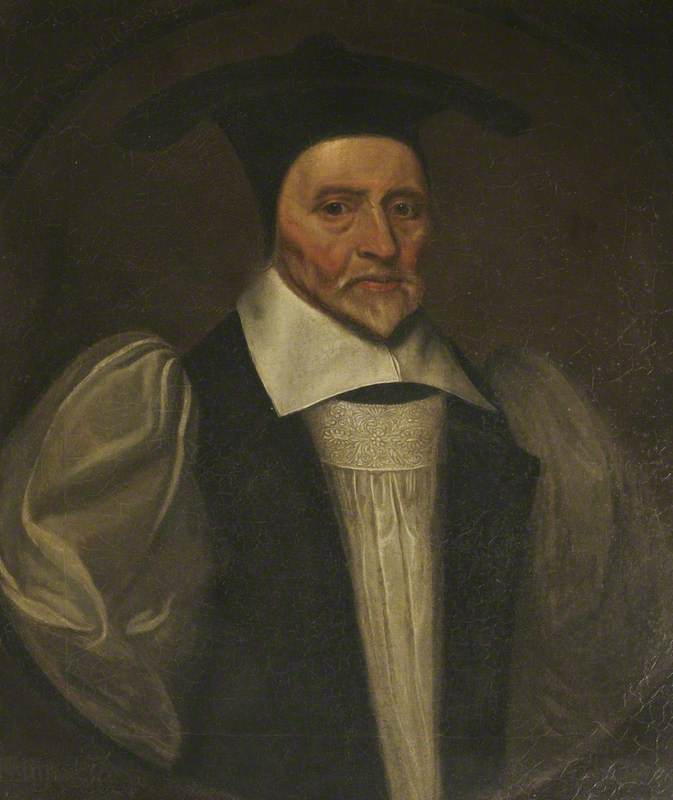
- Robert Sanderson by John Riley
- Diocese: Diocese of Lincoln
- In office: 24 October 1660 – 1663 (d.)
- Predecessor: Thomas Winniffe
- Successor: Benjamin Lany
- Other posts: Regius Professor of Divinity at Oxford (1642–1648 & 1660–1661)

Orders
- Consecration: 28 October 1660 by Brian Duppa

Personal details
- Born: 19 September 1587 Sheffield, West Riding of Yorkshire, England
- Died: 29 January 1663 (aged 75)
- Buried: St Mary's Church, Buckden
- Denomination: Anglican
- Spouse: Ann Nelson
- Education: Lincoln College, Oxford

Robert Sanderson (19 September 1587 – 29 January 1663) was an English theologian and casuist.

== Family and education ==
He was born in Sheffield in Yorkshire and grew up at Gilthwaite Hall, near Rotherham. He was educated at Lincoln College, Oxford. Entering the Church, he rose to be Bishop of Lincoln.

== Logician ==
His work on logic, Logicae Artis Compendium (1615), was long a standard treatise on the subject. It enjoyed at least ten editions during the seventeenth century and was widely read as a textbook. Sanderson's biographer, Izaak Walton writes that by 1678, 'Logicae' had sold 10,000 copies. In her introduction to the 1985 facsimile edition, E. J. Ashworth writes that "The young Isaac Newton studied Sanderson's logic at Cambridge, and as late as 1704." Thomas Heywood of St. John's College, Ashworth adds, recommended Newton "Sanderson or Aristotle himself". Sanderson's logic remained popular even after the appearance of the influential Port-Royal Logic.

== Church career ==
Sanderson's sermons were also admired; but he is perhaps best remembered for his Nine Cases of Conscience Resolved (1678), in consideration of which he has been placed at the head of English casuists. He left large collections of historical and heraldic matter in MS.

At the Stuart Restoration, he was elected to the See of Lincoln on 13 October 1660, confirmed 24 October and consecrated a bishop on 28 October. He was a Calvinist in theology and believed only some individuals were predestined to salvation and eternal life by their calling from God. He further believed that the church, being the small group of pious individuals, kept the nation adverse destinies.

Sanderson is today perhaps best known as the subject of one of Izaak Walton's Lives, published in 1678.

== Works ==
- The Works of Robert Sanderson in Six Volumes (1854) edited by William Jacobson. Oxford at the University Press. Most volumes are available in full or partial views in Google Books.
- Logicae Artis Compendium, edited by E. J. Ashworth. Bologna: Editrice CLUEB, 1985. Also published as vol.VI in 'The Works of Robert Sanderson in Six Volumes' W. Jacobson (ed).

Academic offices
Preceded by John Prideaux	Regius Professor of Divinity at Oxford; 1642–1648	Succeeded by Joshua Hoyle
Preceded by John Conant	Regius Professor of Divinity at Oxford; 1660–1661	Succeeded by William Creed
Church of England titles
Vacant Title last held by Thomas Winniffe	Bishop of Lincoln; 1660–1663	Succeeded by Benjamin Lany
