= William Twisse =

English clergyman and theologian (1578 – 1646)

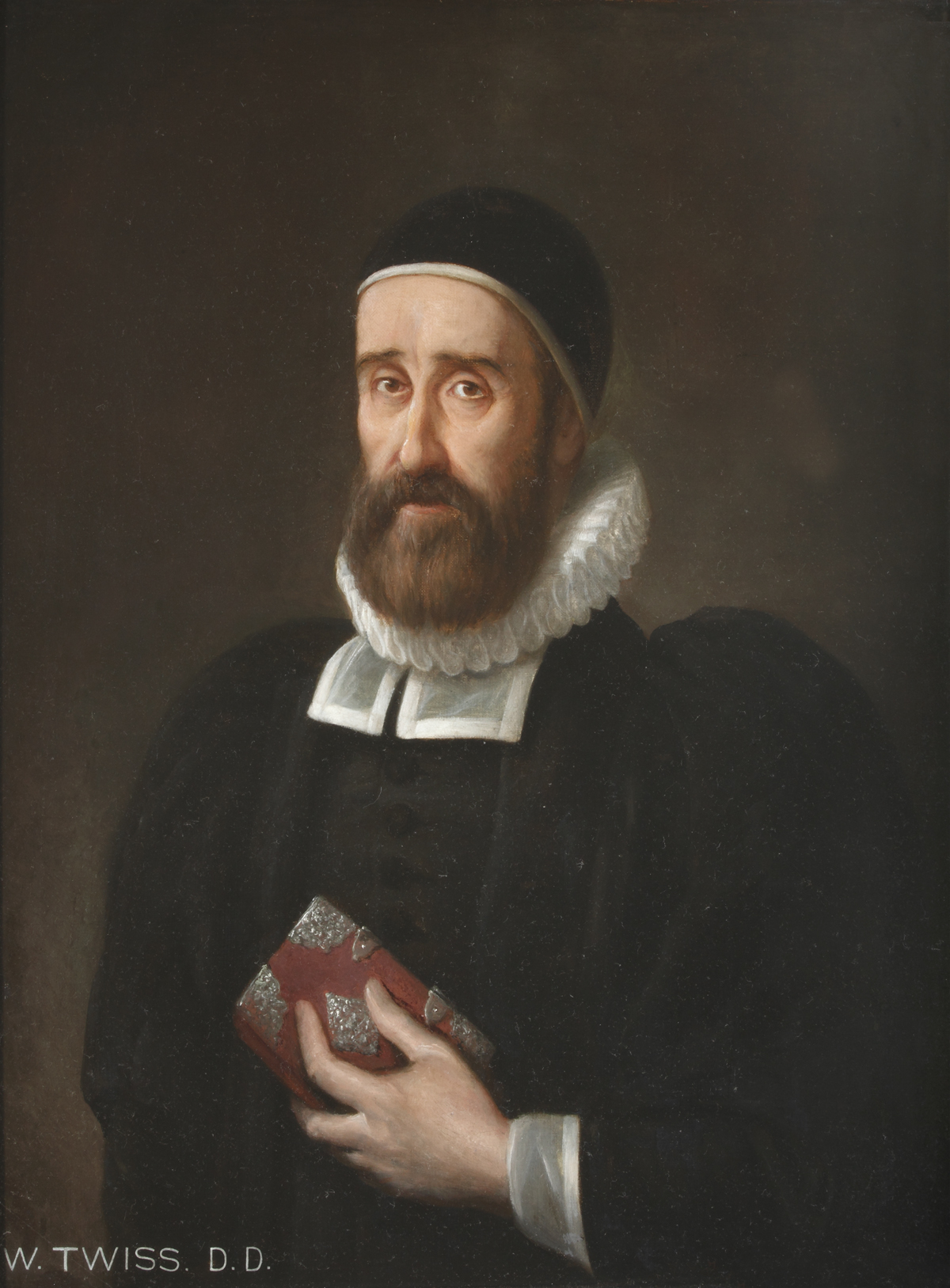
William Twisse

William Twisse (1578 – 20 July 1646) was a prominent English clergyman and theologian. He was named prolocutor of the Westminster Assembly in an ordinance dated 12 June 1643, putting him at the head of the churchmen of the Commonwealth. He was described by a Scottish member, Robert Baillie, as "very good, beloved of all, and highlie esteemed; but merelie bookish."

== Life ==
Twisse was born near Newbury, England; his parents were German. He was educated at Winchester College and New College, Oxford. He was appointed chaplain to Elizabeth of Bohemia, by her father James I of England, in 1612. This position was short-lived, and he returned to England from Heidelberg around 1613. He was then given a living at Newton Longueville. He was involved with Henry Savile in the 1618 edition of the works of Thomas Bradwardine. He was vicar of Newbury from 1620. There he was known as an opponent of William Laud.

He died on 20 July 1646 and was buried in Westminster Abbey but exhumed in 1661 and his remains deposited with those of dozens of other Parliamentarians in a pit in the churchyard of St Margaret's, Westminster.

== Views ==
Twisse was a strong defender of a Calvinist supralapsarian position. In his Vindiciae gratiae of 1632 he attacks Jacobus Arminius, and in Dissertatio de scientia media of 1639 he adopts certain Dominican arguments on predestination. His views were in a minority at the Westminster Assembly.

A premillennialist, he wrote a preface to the 1643 English translation, Key of the Revelation, of Joseph Mede's influential Clavis Apocalyptica. Mede was a friend and correspondent.

== Works ==
- A Discovery of D. Jackson's Vanity (1631) against Thomas Jackson
- Vindiciae Gratiae (Amsterdam, 1632)
- Dissertatio de scientia media tribus libris absoluta (Arnhem 1639)
- The Riches of Gods Love (1653), with Henry Jeanes and John Goodwin
- An Examination of Mr. Cotton's Analysis of The Ninth Chapter of Romans
- The Five Points of Grace and of Predestination
- Of the Morality of the Fourth Commandment
- A Treatise of Mr. Cotton's Clearing Certaine Doubts Concerning Predestination
- The Doctrine of the Synod of Dort and Arles, Reduced to the Practice (1650)
- Of the morality of the Fourth Commandment, as still in force to binde Christians : delivered by way of answer to the translator of Doctor Prideaux his lecture, concerning the doctrine of the Sabbath (1641) OL 14032019M
  - https://archive.org/details/ofmoralityoffour00twis

== See also ==
- Scientia media

Church of England titles
New title	Prolocutor of the Westminster Assembly; 1643–1646	Succeeded by Charles Herle
