= Henry Jeanes =

English clergyman and puritan controversialist

Henry Jeanes (1611–1662) was an English clergyman and puritan controversialist.

== Life ==
He was son of Christopher Jeanes of Kingston, Somerset, born at Allansay. He became in 1626 a commoner of New Inn Hall, Oxford, where, according to Anthony Wood, he was known for disputation. He graduated B.A. 3 June 1630, and proceeded M.A. 14 May 1633; he was incorporated at Cambridge in 1632, and later moved to Hart Hall, Oxford.

On 5 August 1635 he was presented by Sir John Windham to the rectory of Beer Crocombe and Capland in Somerset, and he obtained soon afterwards the vicarage of Kingston. During the early part of the First English Civil War he and his family took refuge at Chichester; later he received the rectory of Chedzoy, near Bridgwater. Here he instructed private pupils, among them being George Bull. Jeanes died at Wells in August 1662, and was buried in the cathedral.

== Works ==
Jeanes wrote:

- 'Treatise concerning a Christian's Careful Abstinence from all Appearance of Evil . . .' Oxford, 1640; another edition 1660.
- 'The Worke of Heaven upon Earthe . . .' an expanded sermon, London, 1649.
- 'The Want of Church Government no warrant for a total omission of the Lord's Supper,' London, 1650, dedicated to Colonel John Pyne; another edition, with a reply to Francis Fulwood, Oxford, 1653.
- 'A Vindication of Dr. Twisse from the Exceptions of Mr. John Goodwin in his Redemption Redeemed,' Oxford, 1653. Appended to William Twisse's 'Riches of God's Love . . . consistent with His Absolute Hatred ... of the Vessels of Wrath.'
- 'A Mixture of Scholasticall Divinity with Practicall,' Oxford, 1656, in several parts. This work Henry Hammond criticised in his 'Ἐκτενέστερον,' to which Jeanes replied in 1657, while Hammond replied again in 1657, and was supported by William Creed in his 'Refuter Refuted,' 1659. Jeanes replied to Hammond a second time in 1660, and to Creed in 1661.
- 'Treatise concerning the Indifferency of Human Actions,' Oxford, 1659.
- 'A Second Part of the Mixture of Scholastical Divinity,' Oxford, 1660, printed with the second reply to Hammond and 'Letters on Original Sin.'
- 'Of Original Righteousness, and its Contrary Concupiscence,' Oxford, 1660, directed against Jeremy Taylor.
- 'Letters between Jeanes and Jeremy Taylor on the subject of Original Sin,' Oxford, 1660.

Jeanes has been wrongly supposed to have been the author of the reply to Milton's Eikonoklastes (1651), entitled The Image Unbroken, by Joseph Jane.
