= Henry Mason (priest) =

Henry Mason (1573? – August 1647) was an English clergyman and theological writer.

== Life ==
He was a younger brother of Francis Mason, archdeacon of Norfolk, and was born at Wigan, Lancashire, about 1573. He entered Brasenose College, Oxford as a servitor in 1592, and was elected Humphrey Ogle's exhibitioner on 2 November 1593. He graduated B.A. in January 1594, and M.A. (from Corpus Christi College) in May 1603. He had previously taken holy orders, and became chaplain of Corpus Christi College in 1602. He proceeded to the degree of B.D. in June 1610, and in the following year was collated to the vicarage of Hillingdon, which he resigned in 1612, when he became rector of St. Matthew's, Friday Street, London.

John King, bishop of London, appointed him his chaplain, and on 14 February 1613 he was collated to St. Andrew Undershaft with St. Mary Axe, London. In 1616 he was installed prebendary of Willesden in St. Paul's Cathedral. This prebend he resigned in March 1637, retaining the rectory of St. Andrew until 1641. When the presbyterians became dominant, he resigned his rectory, and retired to Wigan, where he died early in August 1647, and was buried in Wigan churchyard; he had during his lifetime (in 1632 and 1639) bestowed £240 in trust for the relief of the poor of Wigan. He also gave his library to the grammar school, and made other benefactions to the town.

== Theology ==
Henry mason was an Arminian.

== Works ==
His writings include:

- 'The New Art of Lying, covered by Jesuits under the vaile of Equivocation, discovered and disproved,' 1624, 1634.
- 'Christian Humiliation, or a Treatise of Fasting,' 1625, 1627.
- 'Epicure's Fast, or a Short Discourse discovering the Licenciousnesse of the Roman Church in her Religious Fasts,' 1626, 1628.
- 'Tribunal of the Conscience,' 1626; 2nd edit. 1627; 1634.
- 'The Cure of Cares,' 1627, 1628; 3rd edit. 1634.
- 'Contentment in God's Gifts,' 1630, 1634.

Letters of his appear in Dr. Thomas Jackson's Works, i, 600, and Joseph Mede's Works, p. 767, and some of his pieces occur in Samuel Hoard's God's Love to Mankind, 1653. He left a folio volume of theology in manuscript to Gilbert Sheldon.
