= Johannes Cocceius =

Dutch theologian (1603–1669)

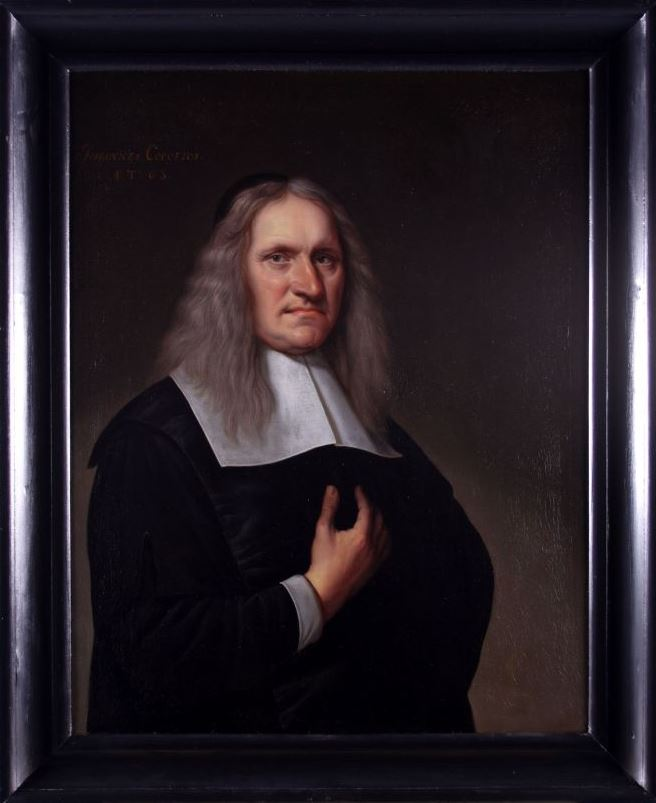
- Born: 9 August 1603; Bremen
- Died: 5 November 1669 (aged 66); Leiden
- Education: University of Franeker
- Occupation: Theologian · Author · Professor
- Known for: Covenant theology
- Notable work: The Doctrine of the Covenant and Testament of God (1648), Lexicon et Commentarius Sermonis Hebraici et Chaldaici (1669)
- Spouse: Catharina Deichmann
- Children: Johann Heinrich Cocceius
- Parent: Timann Coch
- Theological work
- Tradition or movement: Dutch Reformed, Cocceian, Covenant theology

Johannes Cocceius (also Coccejus; Latinized version of the Dutch name Johannes Coch; 9 August 1603 – 5 November 1669) was a Dutch theologian born in Bremen.

== Life ==
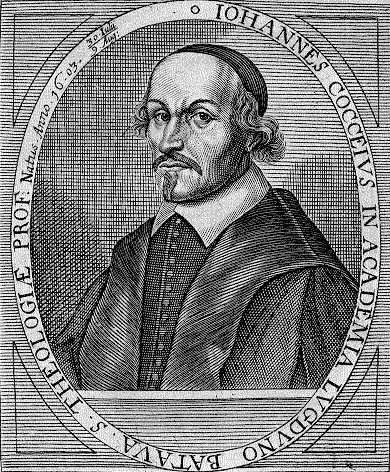
Woodcut of Johannes Cocceius

After studying at Hamburg and the University of Franeker, where Sixtinus Amama was one of his teachers, he became in 1630 professor of biblical philology at the 'gymnasium illustre' in his native town. In 1636 he was transferred to Franeker, where he held the chair of Hebrew, and from 1643 the chair of theology. In 1605 he succeeded the elder Friedrich Spanheim as professor of theology at the University of Leiden.

His chief services as an oriental scholar were in the department of Hebrew philology and exegesis. As one of the leading exponents of the covenant or federal theology, he spiritualized the Hebrew scriptures to such an extent that it was said that Cocceius found Christ everywhere in the Old Testament and Hugo Grotius found him nowhere.

He taught that before as much as after the fall of man, the relation between God and man was a covenant. The first covenant was a Covenant of Works. For this was substituted, after the Fall, the Covenant of Grace, necessitating the coming of Jesus for its fulfillment. He held millenarian views, and was the founder of a school of theologians who were called Cocceians. His most distinguished pupil was Campeius Vitringa.

== Works ==
His major work was his Lexicon et commentarius sermonis hebraici et chaldaici (Leiden, 1669), which has been frequently republished. His theology is fully expounded in his Summa Doctrinae de Foedere et Testamento Dei (1648), where he worked out what would eventually be considered a biblical-theological, redemptive-historical perspective for presenting covenant theology. This Cocceian procedure, known today as "biblical theology", was set against the analytical doctrine-by-doctrine approach of his contemporaries in Holland - most famously, Voetius. For more than half a century, the biblical theology of Cocceius and the systematic theology of Voetius stirred controversy in the church of Holland, each side trying to prove the errors and illegitimacy of the other. As an exponent of federal theology he was tacitly influenced by his teachers in Bremen, Matthias Martinius and Ludwig Crocius.

Other words include Versio Latina Mischnæ cum Excerptis ex Gemara Tractatuum Synhedrin et Makkot, (1629), Judaicarum Responsionum et Quæstionum Consideratio, (1662) and Tractatus Makkot Versio Latina (in Surenhusius, Versio Latina Mischnæ et Commentationum Maimonidis et Obadjæ) (1698-1703).

His collected works were published in 12 folio volumes (Amsterdam, 1673–1675).

== See also ==
- Sybilline oracles
