= St. Ansgarii Church =

Coordinates: 53°04′42″N 8°48′12″E

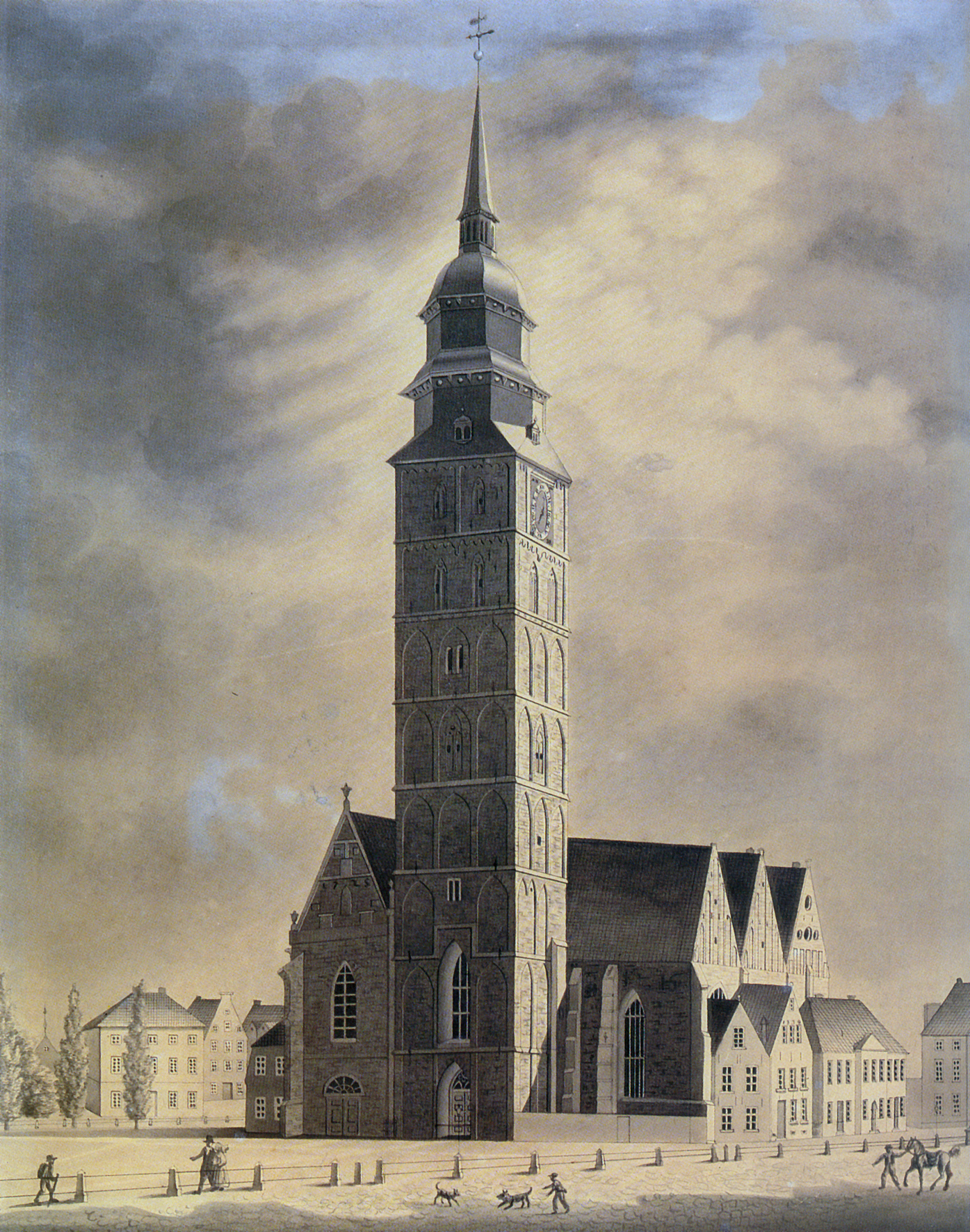
St. Ansgarii church in Bremen, ca. 1839

St. Ansgarii Church was a medieval Brick Gothic church in Bremen. The 97-meter-high tower was the tallest landmark of the city for centuries. The church was the starting point of the Reformation in Bremen. The building was severely damaged during World War II and the ruin was demolished in the 1950s. A new church building under the same name was constructed outside of the old city.

== History ==
The name and tradition of St. Ansgarii go back to around 850, when Archbishop Ansgar of Bremen, known as the "Apostle of the North", established a foundation for twelve clergy here. Ansgar was later buried in Bremen in 865. In the late 12th century, Archbishop Hartwig II set up a collegiate monastery with twelve canons, with the task of building a basilica in honor of St. Ansgar. This original Brick Gothic parish church was consecrated in 1243 and converted into a hall church at the end of the 14th century. The main tower on the west side was not completed until the 14th century. After a fire in 1590, a canopy was added to the top and the tower reached its final height of about 97 meters.

A sermon by the Dutch Augustinian friar Heinrich von Zütphen, a colleague of Martin Luther, in the Ansgarii church was the starting point for the Reformation in Bremen in 1522 emphasizing the theological and historical importance of the St. Ansgarii community for the history of Bremen.

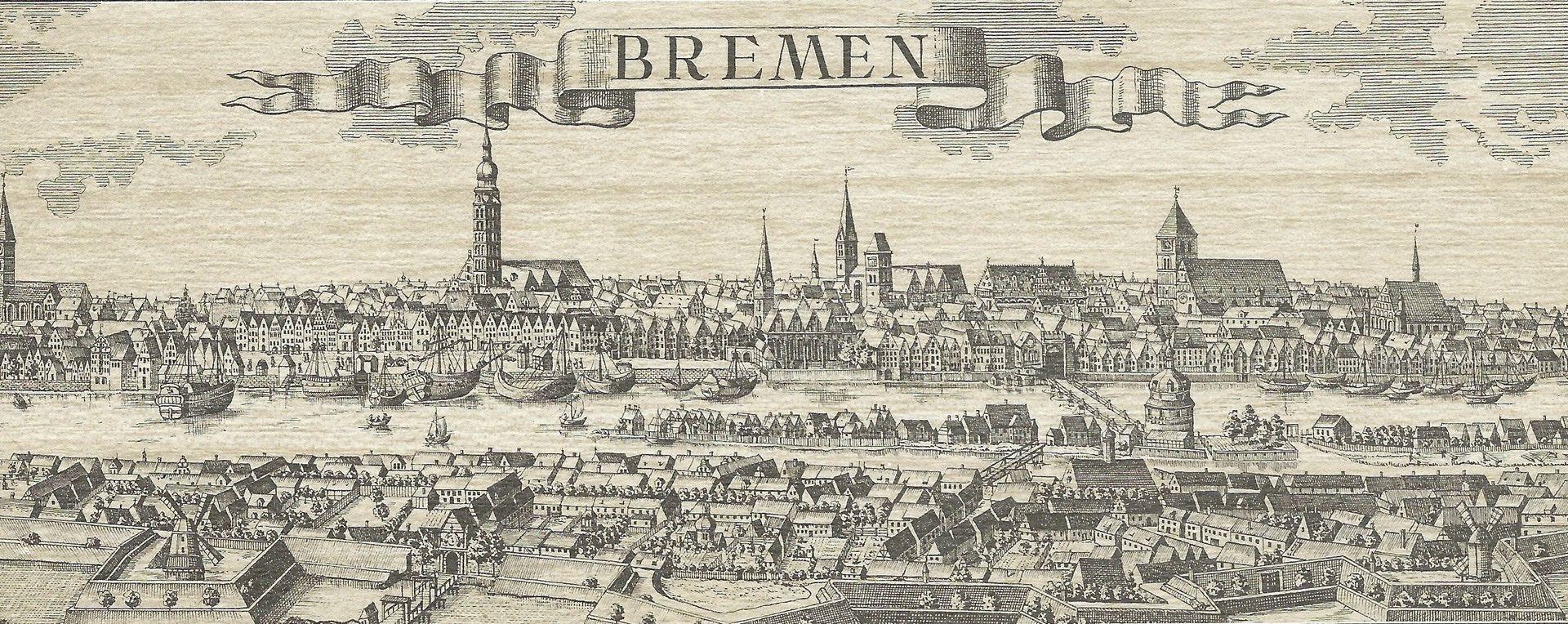
Bremen in 1729, St. Ansgarii Church in the center-left

The tower steeple, the tallest in the city, was used as the center point for the first Bremen land survey in 1797 and served mathematician Carl Friedrich Gauß for further triangulation surveys in 1824. These events are commemorated on a metal plaque on the "Ansgarikirchhof" city square.

The church was severely damaged in the air raids on Bremen during World War II. The main tower collapsed on September 1, 1944, and damaged further elements of the church. The ruin was demolished in the 1950s and the "Bremer Carreé" city block and shopping center was built in its place. A new church building under the same name was constructed in 1955–57 in the outer city district of Schwachhausen, serving as the new center for the Ansgarii church community. Some elements of the medieval church like the pulpit and elaborate stone epitaphs survived and were placed inside the new church building.

The memorial "Ansgar column" was installed in 1965 on the "Ansgarikirchhof" city square in honor of the 1100th anniversary of the death of St. Ansgar and in memory of the destruction of St. Ansgarii church in 1944. The bronze column forms a Bible, ship and cross: the symbols of Ansgar's mission.

A group of citizens formed the committee "Anschari e.V. - Association for the historical cityscape of Bremen" which promotes the reconstruction of the Ansgarii Church and the demolition of the "Bremer Carreé" city block that was built in its place.

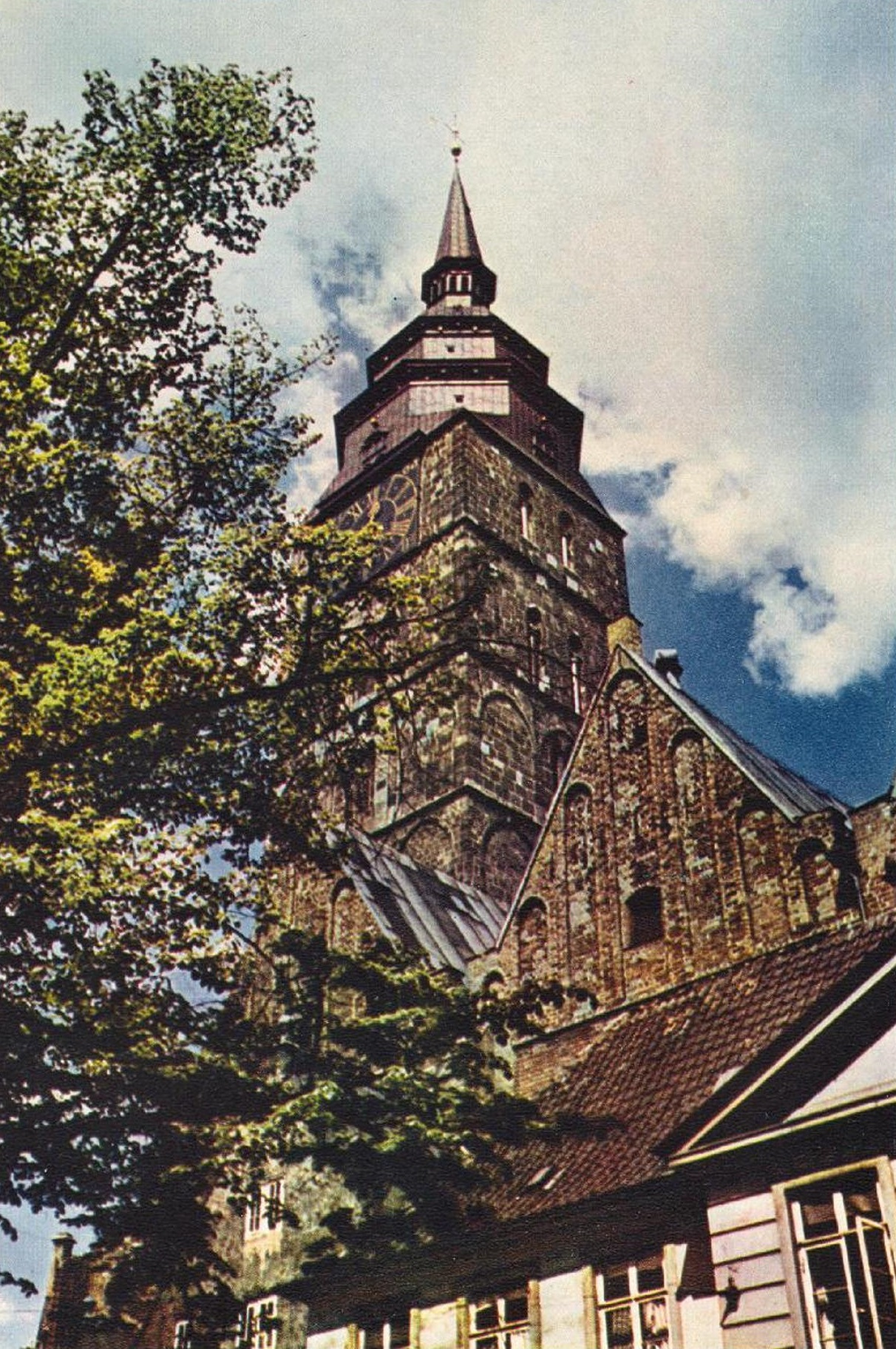
Bell tower in the 1930s

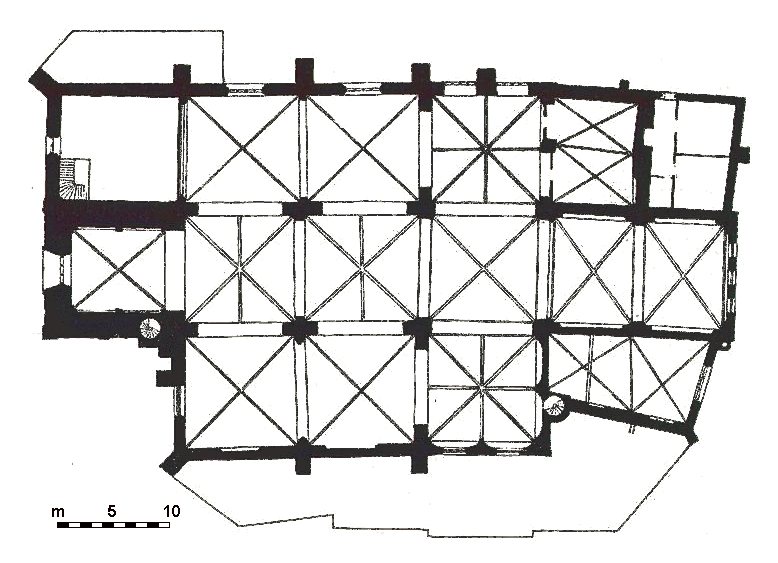
Floor plan of the medieval construction

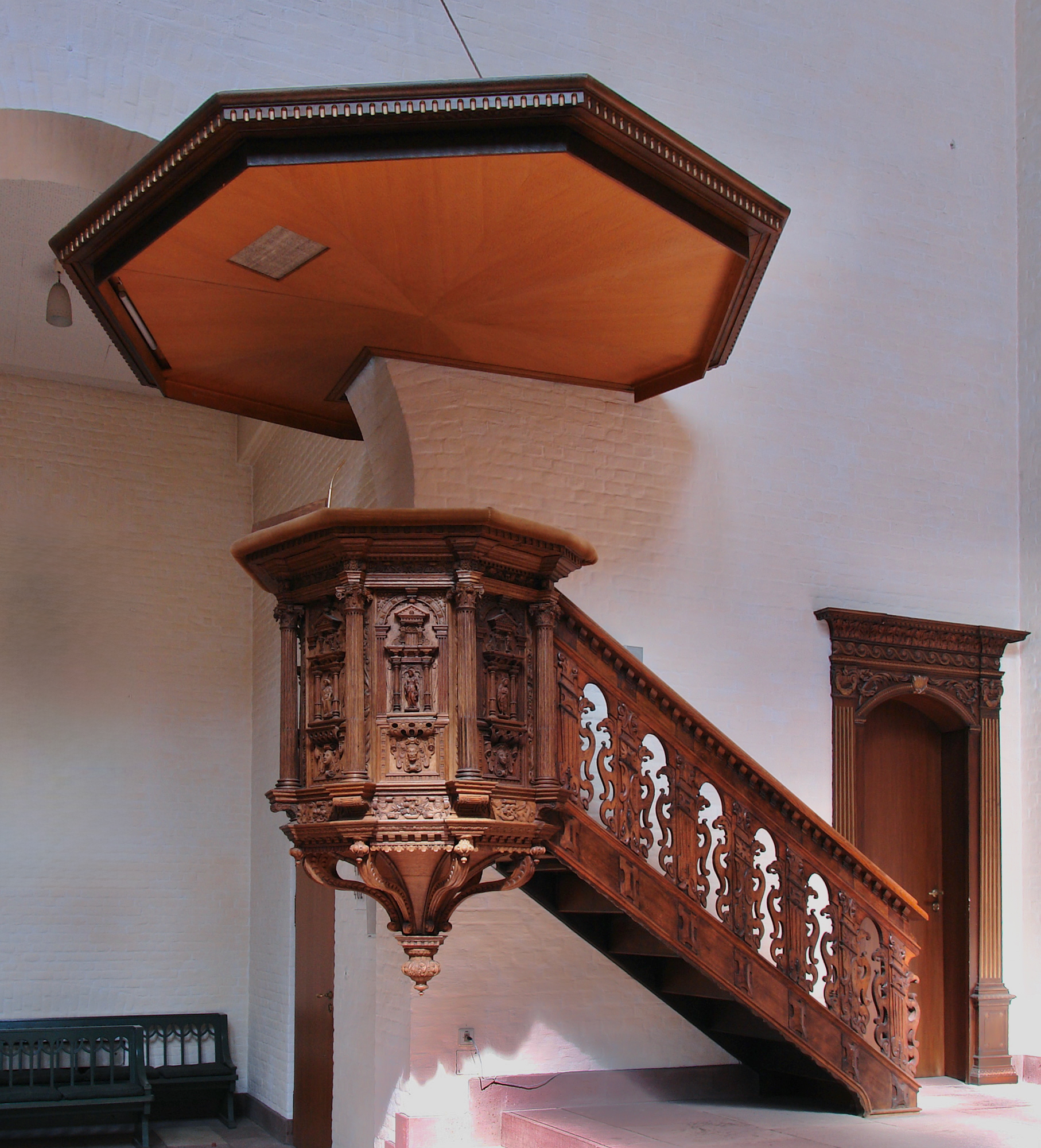
Surviving wooden pulpit

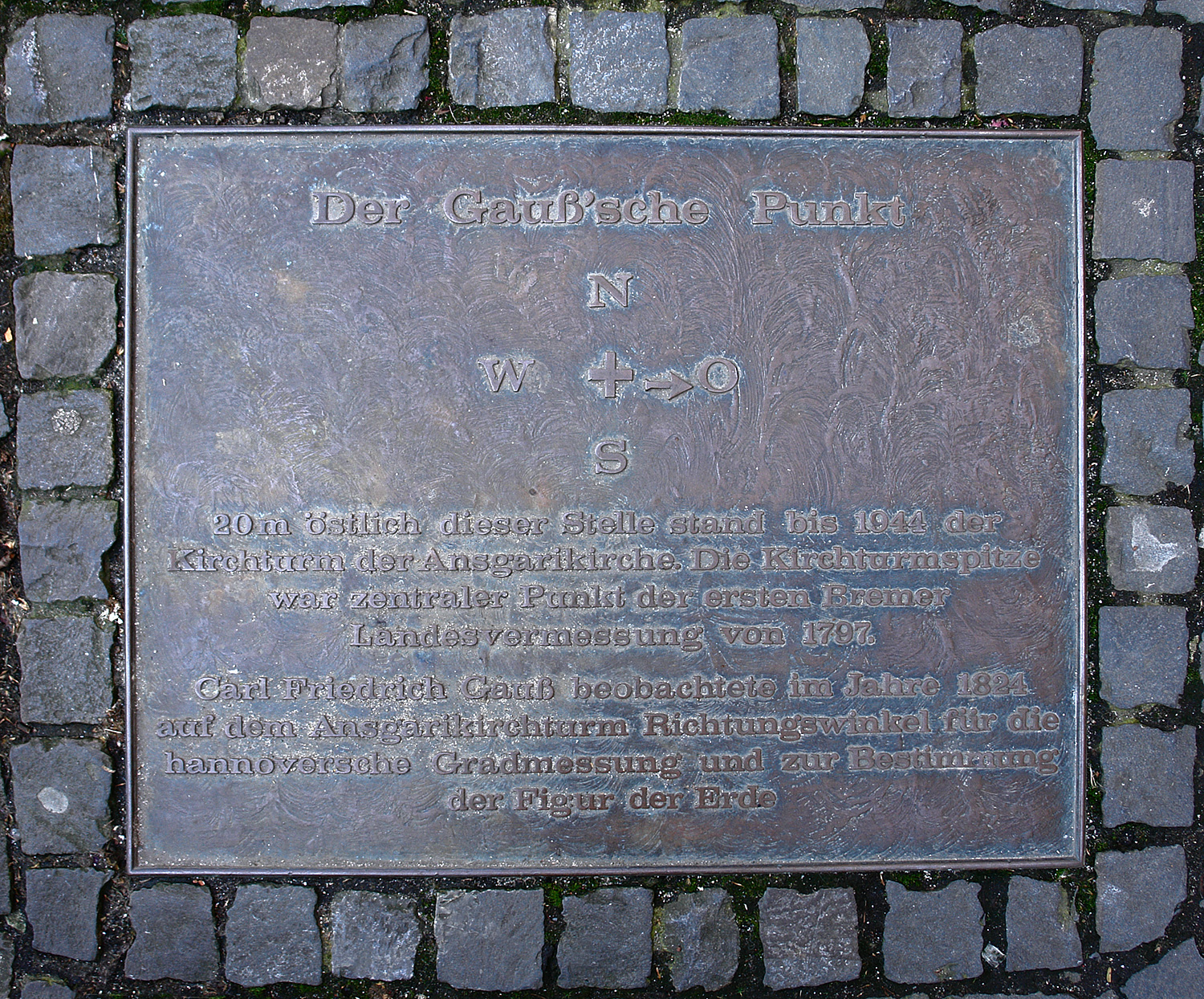
Plaque for land surveys 1797 & 1824

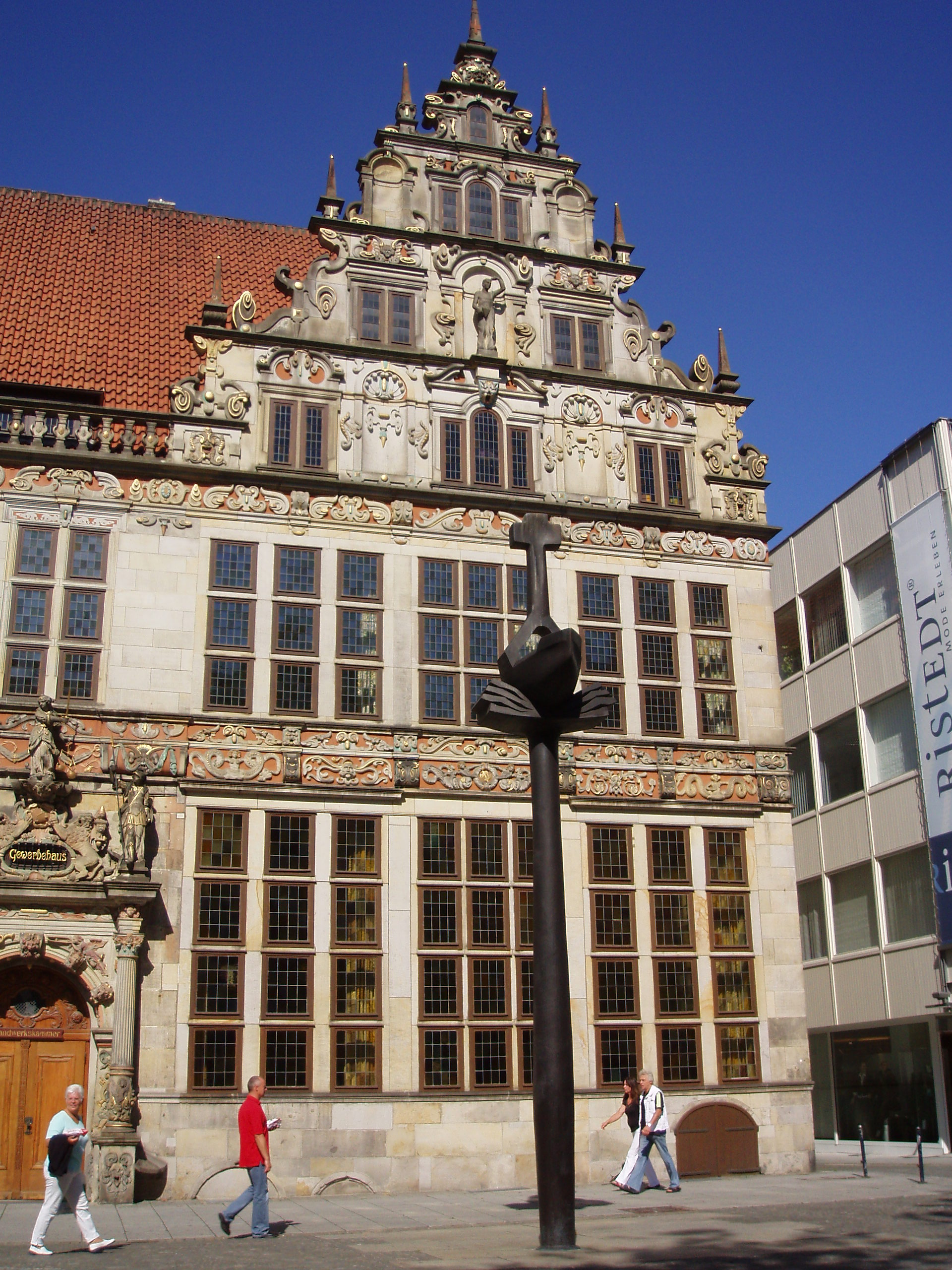
"Ansgar column" from 1965

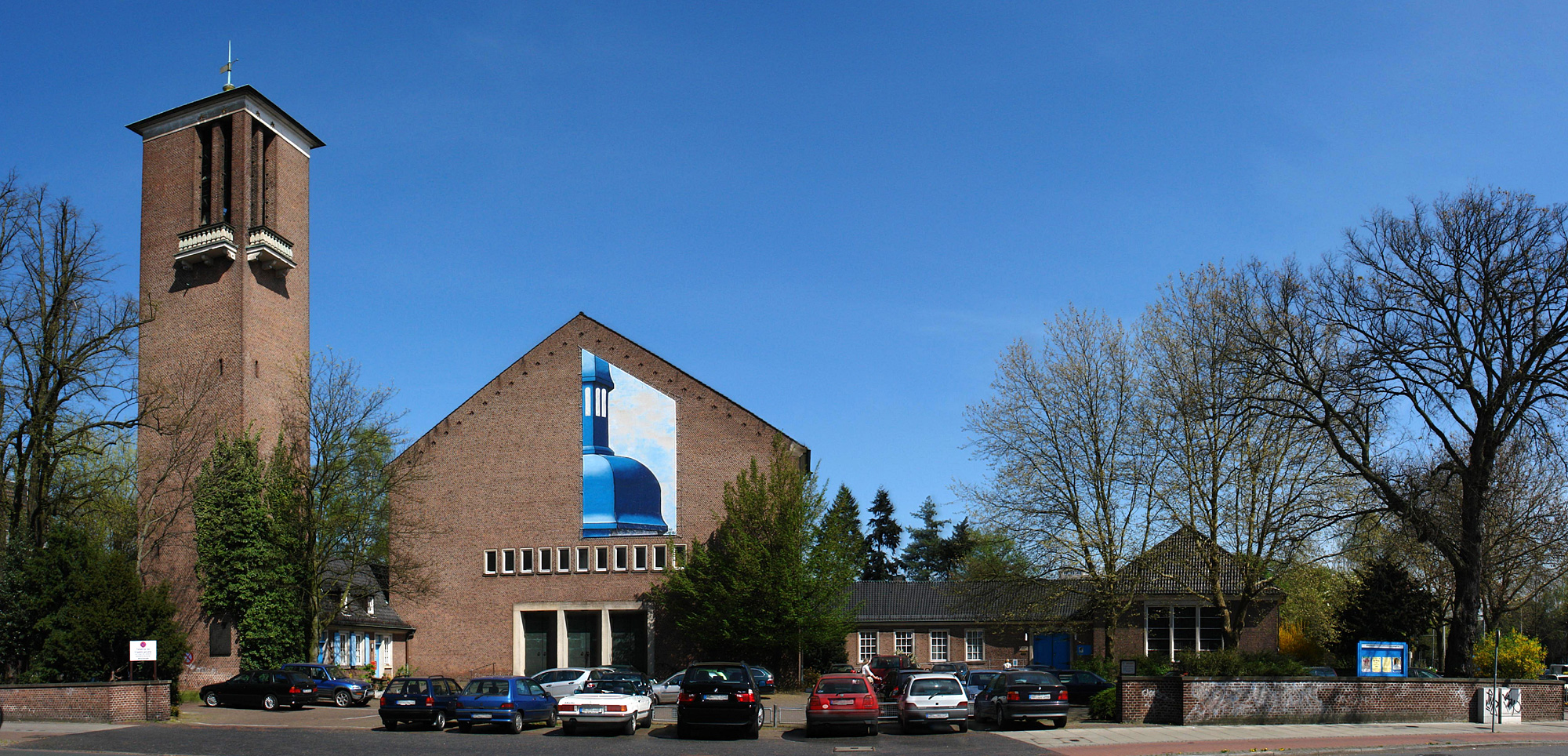
Modern church built in the 1950s
