= John Davenant =

17th-century Anglican Bishop of Salisbury

The Right Reverend John Davenant
- Bishop of Salisbury
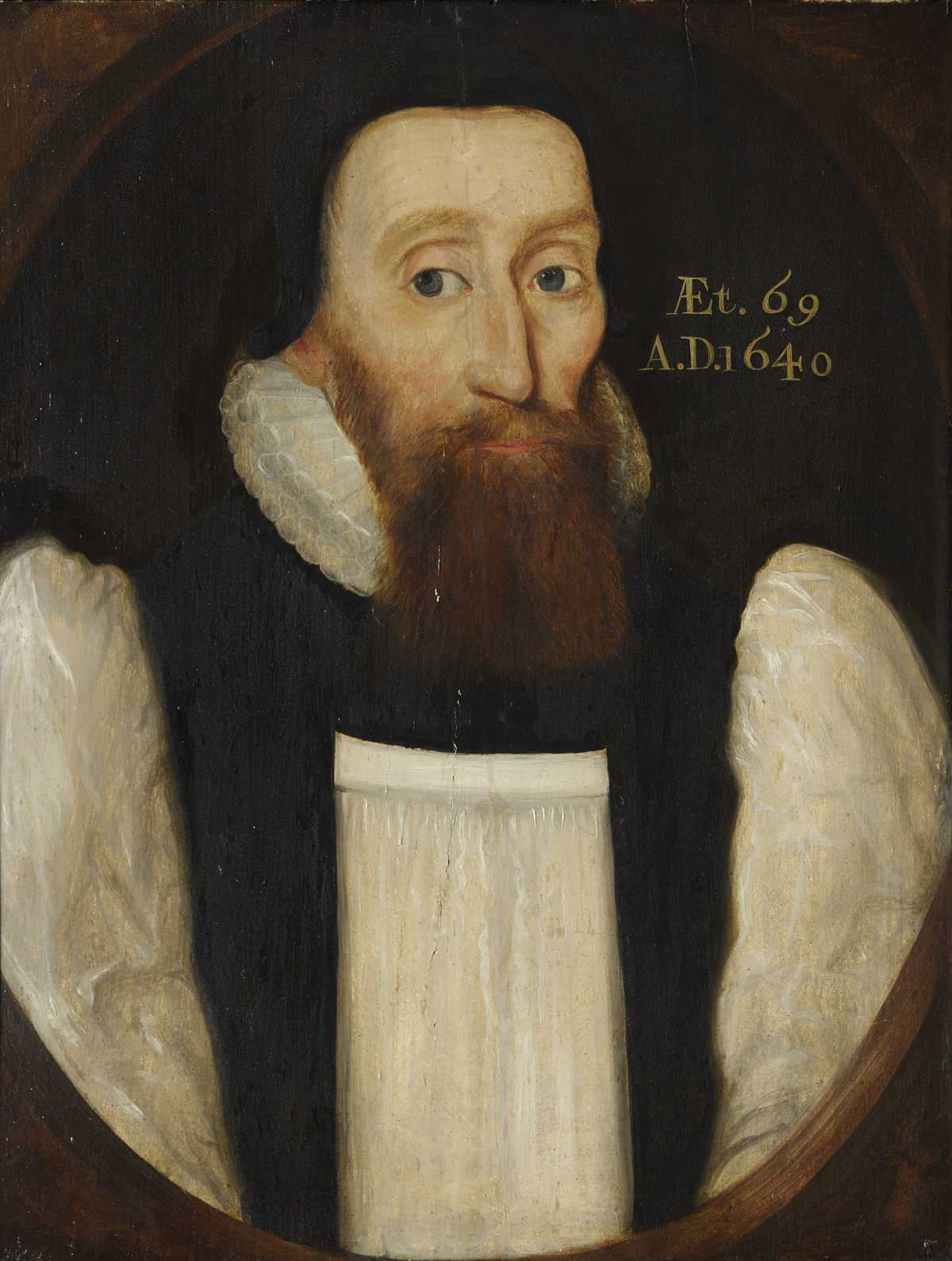
- English scholar and Bishop of Salisbury John Davenant (1572–1641), c. 1625.
- Installed: 1621
- Term ended: 1641
- Predecessor: Robert Tounson
- Successor: Brian Duppa
- Other post: Lady Margaret's Professor of Divinity

Personal details
- Born: 1572 London
- Died: 1641 (aged 68–69) Salisbury
- Denomination: Church of England
- Occupation: Churchman

John Davenant (20 May 1572 – 20 April 1641) was an English academic and bishop of Salisbury from 1621. He also served as one of the English delegates to the Synod of Dort.

== Life ==
He was educated at Queens' College, Cambridge, elected a fellow there in 1597, and was its President from 1614 to 1621. From 1609 onward, he served as the Lady Margaret's Professor of Divinity, from which he was called away by James I to represent the Church of England at the Synod of Dort in 1618, along with Samuel Ward, Joseph Hall and George Carleton.

== Views ==
At Dort there were divisions in the Anglican camp:

On the one hand Davenant, Ward and Martinius believed that Christ died for all particular men; Carleton, Goad, and Balcanquhall himself believed that Christ died only for the elect, who consisted of all sorts of men.

A compromise pursued went in Davenant's direction. According to one interpretation of Davenant's views:

Davenant attempted to find a middle road between outright Arminianism and the supralapsarianism which some in England favored. He found in the theology of Saumur such a road and defended the Amyrauldian views of hypothetical universalism, a general atonement in the sense of intention as well as sufficiency, a common blessing of the cross, and a conditional salvation. All these views stood in close connection with the theology of the well-meant offer of salvation to all.

Other interpretations see Davenant as distinguishing himself from the School of Saumur and from the views of Moses Amyraut. When French Amyraldians attempted to garner support, citing the views of members of the British delegation to the Synod of Dort, Davenant offered a reply by way of clarification in his tract, “On the controversy among the French divines," in which he appears to make a distinction between his own views and those of the Amyraldians.

Davenant sympathised with the aims of John Dury, as far as unifying Protestantism went, and wrote in his favour, a piece subsequently quoted by Gerard Brandt.

On the topic of predestination, he engaged in controversy with the Arminian Anglican Samuel Hoard.

In an undated letter to his friend Samuel Ward, with whom he had served as a delegate to Dort, Davenant endorses the view (shared by Ward) that all baptised infants receive the remission of the guilt of original sin in baptism and that this constitutes their infant baptismal regeneration, justification, sanctification, and adoption. In his view, this infant baptismal remission, which involves the objective status of the infant apart from subjective operations of grace, will not suffice for justification, if the child does not later come to faith. Nonetheless, he goes on to argue that this poses no contradiction to the doctrine of the perseverance of the saints as articulated by Dort, since the "perseverance" intended there presupposes subjective grace.

Davenant's "Dissertation on the Death of Christ" was translated into English from Latin in 1831 by Josiah Allport and published as an appendix to his commentary on the Letter of Paul to the Colossians. The Commentary on Colossians was reprinted, without the "Dissertation," in 2005 by the Banner of Truth Trust (ISBN 0 85151 909 1). The "Dissertation" was republished by Quinta Press in 2006 (ISBN 978-1-89785-627-7).

== Notes ==
Academic offices
Preceded by Thomas Playfere	Lady Margaret's Professor of Divinity; 1609–1618	Succeeded by Samuel Ward
Preceded by Humphrey Tyndall	President of Queens' College, Cambridge; 1614–1622	Succeeded by John Mansell
Church of England titles
Preceded by Robert Tounson	Bishop of Salisbury; 1621–1641	Succeeded by Brian Duppa
