= Logical order of God's decrees =

Aspect of Christian Reformed theology

Reformed Christianity studies the logical order of God's decree to ordain the fall of man in relation to his decree to save some sinners through election and condemn others through reprobation. Several opposing positions have been proposed, all of which have names with the Latin root lapsus (meaning fall), and the word stem (a type of root) -lapsarianism. Supralapsarianism and infralapsarianism assert that election and reprobation respectively preceded and succeeded the fall of man logically, not temporally.

== Overview ==
Supralapsarianism (also called antelapsarianism, pre-lapsarianism or prelapsarianism) is the view that God's decrees of election and reprobation logically preceded the decree of the fall of man. Infralapsarianism (also called postlapsarianism and sublapsarianism) asserts that God's decrees of election and reprobation logically succeeded the decree of the Fall. The words can also be used in connection with other topics, e.g. supra- and infralapsarian Christology.

The difference between the two views are minute; supralapsarianism, by virtue of its belief that God creates the elect and reprobate, is a suggestion or provides an inference that at some level, God decreed sin to enter into the world without being the author of it. Infralapsarianism teaches that all men are sinful by nature (due to the Fall), are thereby condemned through our own sin (free will), and that God had foreknowledge of whom He would rescue from condemnation. The infralapsarianist view follows Ephesians 1:4–6, "... even as He chose us in Him before the foundation of the world, that we should be holy and blameless before Him. In love He predestined us for adoption to Himself as sons through Jesus Christ, according to the purpose of His will, to the praise of His glorious grace, with which He has blessed us in the Beloved" (ESV). That is, some are chosen to be elect (foreknowledge) but not created elect.

Many Calvinists reject both lapsarian views for various reasons. Herman Bavinck rejected both because he sees the entire system of God's plan of salvation as organic, with each part mutually dependent and determinative, rather than some parts "causing" others.

Lapsarian views on order of decrees of God
	Supralapsarianism	Infralapsarianism
Decree to:	Save some and condemn others	
Decree to:	Create the elect and the reprobate	Create human beings
Decree to:	Render the Fall certain (by which all deserve to be condemned)	
Decree to:		Save some from condemnation and leave others condemned
Decree to:	Secure salvation only for the elect	

== History ==
=== Synod of Dort ===
The first to articulate the supralapsarian view were Theodore Beza and Jerome Zanchius. A few later Calvinists, in particular those influenced by Beza's theology, embraced supralapsarianism. In England Beza's influence was felt at Cambridge, where William Perkins and William Ames held to it, as well as Franciscus Gomarus in the Netherlands. Later, William Twisse wrote two comprehensive books on supralapsarianism, one in Latin entitled Vindiciae Gratiae, Potestatis, Et Providentiae Dei and an English work entitled The Riches of God's Love unto the Vessels of Mercy. In the 20th century, proponents of supralapsarianism include Abraham Kuyper, Herman Hoeksema, Arthur Pink, Gordon Clark. Historically, it is estimated that less than 5% of all Calvinists ascribe to supralapsarianism. The infralapsarianism view seems to be expressed in the Synod of Dort in 1618. In the Canons of Dort, First Point of Doctrine, Article 7, it states:

Before the foundation of the world, by sheer grace, according to the free good pleasure of his will, [God] chose in Christ to salvation a definite number of particular people out of the entire human race which had fallen by its own fault from its original innocence into sin and ruin.

However the synod did not reject those who held to a supralapsarian position, as illustrated in the trial held against Johannes Maccovius and his eventual exoneration concerning his views on sin in the divine decree. Other supralapsarians at the synod included Gomarus, Ames, and Gisbertus Voetius, none of whom took exception to the Canons of Dort.

=== Views of William Twisse ===
The difficulty in ascertaining an historical supralapsarian position is that while many supralapsarians may have held similar positions with regard to the ordering of the decree, the actual object and subject of predestination may differ among many. The example of William Twisse may be interesting to many given some of his emphases, which may not be as unique to him historically. Regarding his doctrine of salvation, Twisse was explicitly and staunchly supralapsarian, although his views are difficult to fit into the standard definition of supralapsarianism. He adhered to the classic supralapsarian dictum: Quod primum est in intentione, ultimum est in executione...quod ultimum est in executione, primum est in intentione (that which is first in intention is last in execution...that which is last in execution is first in intention) and emphasized these repeatedly in his writings.

Most supralapsarians would have held to the general claim that the result or final intention of the divine decree is the manifestation of God's glory particularly through the application of divine mercy upon some and divine justice upon others. God's mercy is shown to some in both the forgiveness of those guilty of imputed and actual sin and the bestowal of eternal life. On the other hand, God's justice is shown in the permitting of those who are guilty of imputed and actual sin to continue on their chosen path and the bestowal of divine judgment for their unrepentant disobedience. As the manifestation of glory through mercy and justice is the final intention, given the dictum, it is the last set of elements to come to pass within history, or last in execution. What is not clear is how supralapsarians saw the means playing out to this final end.

Infralapsarians regarded the Fall as an occasion for election and reprobation, choosing some out of a fallen mass and passing by others. In the supralapsarian view, Twisse maintained that the Fall did not occasion election or reprobation. But he also did not believe that the gulf between infra- and supralapsarians was that extensive, thus stating that the differences between the two were "meerely Logicall." Although he did not believe that the Fall occasioned election and reprobation, he did not maintain that election and reprobation had no regard for the Fall whatsoever. He cited Thomas Aquinas repeatedly to the effect that "reprobation includeth the will of God of permitting sin, and of inferring damnation for sin." Concomitant to this, he claimed that "God neither damnes nor decrees to damne any man, but for sinne and finall perseverance therein".

It may seem that Twisse was performing double-talk at this point as a supralapsarian, but Twisse maintained that "not one of our divines, that I know, doth maintaine that God did ever purpose to inflict damnation, but for sin." Twisse did not separate the object decreed from the method in which it was decreed (modus res) and, that the one divine decree had several elements each with its own integrity. The decree is unconditional and will be fulfilled accordingly, but fulfillment does not carry the same means in each object within the one decree: differing objects within the decree have differing modes of agency and thus differing modes of fulfillment.

According to Twisse, election and reprobation are within the decree intended for the final end, but the means through which this final end is brought about is not immediately present within the eternal decree. This is manifested within history. Reprobation is thus not an ordination to damnation nakedly considered. It is a decree to deny saving grace within time. In such a state, an individual sinner would receive punishment for their sins. The decree does not necessitate them to sin (as choices the creature makes are contingent and belong to them) nor does it directly prevent them from saving faith and repentance. Reprobation is not an act of divine justice, but a decree that divine justice will be given to some createable and fallible persons who in time will be fallen. Election for Twisse, unlike that of the infralapsarians, is itself not an act of grace, but an election for some createable and fallible persons to receive grace leading to saving faith and repentance while fallen in time. Equally then, election thus was not an act of mercy, as it is with infralapsarians, but a determination that some will receive mercy in time. Election, reprobation, the Fall, mercy, and justice are coordinate elements within the one divine decree. Election and reprobation do not occasion the Fall, nor does the Fall occasion election and reprobation, but they are coordinate elements logically ordered for purpose of manifesting divine glory. (Note: Twisse, concerning both how supralapsarians have been understood historically and just how consistent Twisse was in relating the decree to the object decreed, was a supralapsarian and a hypothetical universalist. For he hath not wished, but ordained, and made it a positive law, that whosoever believeth shall be saved, and herehence it followeth that if all and every one, from the beginning of the World to the end, shall believe in Christ, all and every one of them shall be saved.)
