= Prolocutor =

Chairman of church assemblies

A prolocutor is a chairman of some ecclesiastical assemblies in Anglicanism.

== Usage in the Church of England ==
In the Church of England, the Prolocutor is chair of the lower house of the Convocations of Canterbury and York, the House of Clergy. The Prolocutor presides in that house and acts as representative and spokesperson in the upper house. They are elected by the lower house in the Province of Canterbury and Province of York for a period of five years at the beginning of each quinquennium of the General Synod of the Church of England. The two Convocations each also elect two deputies, known in the Northern Province as the Deputy Prolocutor, and in the Southern Province as the Pro-Prolocutor.

The Prolocutor plays a role in the Confirmation of Election of a bishop or archbishop, 'supporting' (in some cases) a member of the lower house moving to the upper house.

Following the inauguration of the General Synod in 2015, Simon Butler was elected as the Prolocutor of the Lower House of the Convocation of Canterbury. Cherry Vann was elected as Prolocutor of the Lower House of the Convocation of York, but on her being made Bishop of Monmouth in January 2020, Chris Newlands was elected in her place. The current Prolocutor is Revd Kate Wharton. The current Prolocutor of the Lower House of the Convocation of Canterbury is Ven. Luke Miller.

The term means one who speaks for others (Lat. pro, for, and loqui, to speak).

== Usage in the Anglican Church of Canada ==
In the Anglican Church of Canada, the Prolocutor of the General Synod acts as the deputy to the Primate. As such, he or she ranks as the second executive officer of the General Synod of the Anglican Church of Canada. The current prolocutor is Cynthia Haines Turner, who previously served as Deputy Prolocutor.

Each of the four Ecclesiastical Provinces also has a Prolocutor, who serves a similar function, as a deputy to the Metropolitan (Archbishop) of the Province.

The office of Prolocutor has its origins in the bi-cameral Provincial and General Synods. The relevant Archbishop (Primate or Metropolitan) acted as President of the Upper House (Bishops), and the Prolocutor was the elected President of the Lower House (Clergy and Laity). These Synods are no longer fully bi-cameral, but the office of Prolocutor is retained with different functions. The General Synod reverts to a bi-cameral structure for the election of the Primate, during which the Prolocutor chairs the meeting of the Clergy and Laity. In addition, the Constitution provides for separate meetings of the three Orders (Bishops, Clergy, and Laity) in which the Prolocutor and Deputy Prolocutor chair the Orders of Clergy and Laity.

The antecedents of the Canadian office are in the Convocations of the Church of England, in which the Lower House comprises clergy, laity not being members of Convocations. Only clergy and laity, not bishops, may serve as Prolocutor.

== See also ==
- Speaker (politics) – Presiding officer of a legislative body
