= Elisha Coles =

Elisha Coles may refer to:

- Elisha Coles (lexicographer) (c. 1640–1680), English lexicographer and stenographer
- Elisha Coles (Calvinist) (1608?–1688), English college servant, university official and author of a Calvinist theological work
