= John Goddard (engraver) =

English engraver

John Goddard (fl. 1645–1671) was an early English engraver. He was apprenticed to the engraver Robert Vaughan in 1631.

== Works ==
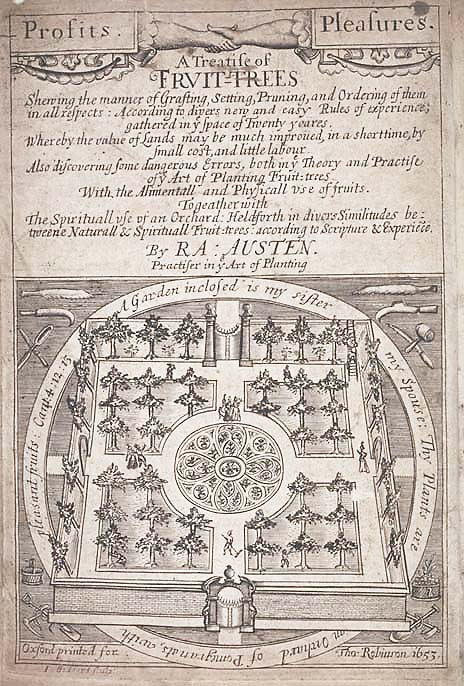
Frontispiece of A Treatise on Fruit-trees (1653) by Ralph Austen, engraving by John Goddard. The picture is emblematic, referring to the enclosed garden of the Song of Solomon, and so to the Church. At the same time, it shows gardening tools and a planting plan.

Goddard is known mostly from a few portraits and book illustrations. The portraits include:

- Martin Billingsley, the writing master, in 1651.
- John Bastwick.
- Alexander Ross, in 1654, as frontispiece to Ross's continuation of Walter Raleigh's History of the World.

He engraved the title-page to William Austin's translation of Cicero's treatise, Cato Major, published in 1671. For Thomas Fuller's Pisgah-sight of Palestine, published in 1645, Goddard engraved the sheet of armorial bearings at the beginning, and some of the maps, including a ground plan of the Temple of Solomon. He worked also for the arms painter Sylvanus Morgan, and the writing-teachers Richard Gething and Thomas Shelton, and engraved maps for John Ferrar and Peter Heylyn. Further plates by him are known, including a set of The Seven Deadly Sins.

== Notes ==
Attribution

This article incorporates text from a publication now in the public domain: Stephen, Leslie; Lee, Sidney, eds. (1890). "Goddard, John". Dictionary of National Biography. Vol. 22. London: Smith, Elder & Co.
