= Richard Gething =

17th-century English writing-master

Richard Gething (c. 1585 – c. 1652) was an English calligrapher.

== Life ==
Gething was born in Herefordshire. He was a scholar of John Davies of Hereford, the famous writing-master of Hereford, and was thought to surpass his master in every branch of his art. Coming to London, he started in business at the Hand and Pen in Fetter Lane. In 1616 he published A Coppie Book of the Usuall Hands Written. An enlarged edition, entitled Calligraphotechnica, was published in 1619: it had twenty-six engraved quarto plates and a frontispiece portrait of Gething, and was dedicated to Sir Francis Bacon.

In 1645 he published Chirographia, consisting of thirty-seven plates engraved by John Goddard. In it Gething says "he has exactly traced and followed certain pieces, both in character and language, of the ablest calligraphotechnists and Italian masters that ever wrote, with certain pieces of cursory hands, not heretofore extant, newly come in use." Another edition of Chirographia, probably published after his death, is entitled Gething Redivivus, or the Pen's Master-Piece. Being the last work of that eminent and accomplished master in this art, containing exemplars of all curious hands written (London, 1664). Prefixed is his portrait, engraved by J. Chantry.

William Massey considered that "on account of his early productions from the rolling press, he may stand in comparison with Bales, Davies, and Billingsley, those heads and fathers, as I may call them, of our English calligraphic tribe".
