= Bulkington =

Village in Warwickshire, England

Coordinates: 52.47691°N 1.424989°W

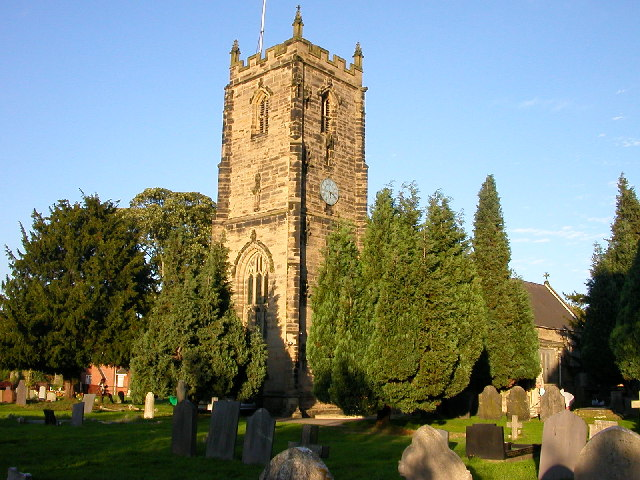
- St James' Church

- Location within Warwickshire
- Population: 6,080 (2021 Ward)
- OS grid reference: SP3986
- District: Nuneaton and Bedworth
- Shire county: Warwickshire
- Region: West Midlands
- Country: England
- Sovereign state: United Kingdom
- Post town: BEDWORTH
- Postcode district: CV12
- Dialling code: 024
- Police: Warwickshire
- Fire: Warwickshire
- Ambulance: West Midlands
- UK Parliament: Rugby

Bulkington is a large village and former civil parish near Bedworth, in the Nuneaton and Bedworth district of Warwickshire, England. In the 2011 census the ward had a population of 6,146 decreasing slightly to 6,080 at the 2021 census. It is located around 6 miles (10 km) northeast of Coventry, just south of the town of Nuneaton, east of Bedworth and 5 miles (8 km) southwest of Hinckley. Despite historically having stronger links with Bedworth, Bulkington forms part of the Nuneaton Urban Area. Bulkington was mentioned in the Domesday Book as Bochintone, meaning "estate associated with a man called Bulca".

The parish originally contained seven hamlets, two of which were subsumed by Bulkington village following residential building expansion which began in the 1930s. These hamlets were Marston-Jabbet, Ryton, Weston in Arden, and Wolvershill, and parts of Barnacle and Bramcott. Ryton and Weston in Arden were subsumed by Bulkington village in the 20th century.

Historically the main industry in Bulkington was ribbon weaving. Today Bulkington is largely a commuter village for larger nearby urban centres such as Coventry, Nuneaton, Bedworth, Hinckley and Leicester.

Bulkington has connections with the locally born author George Eliot (Mary Ann Evans), who knew the village well. She is thought to have referred to it as Raveloe in her book Silas Marner (1861). The church of St James is where George Eliot's uncle and aunt are buried.

== History ==
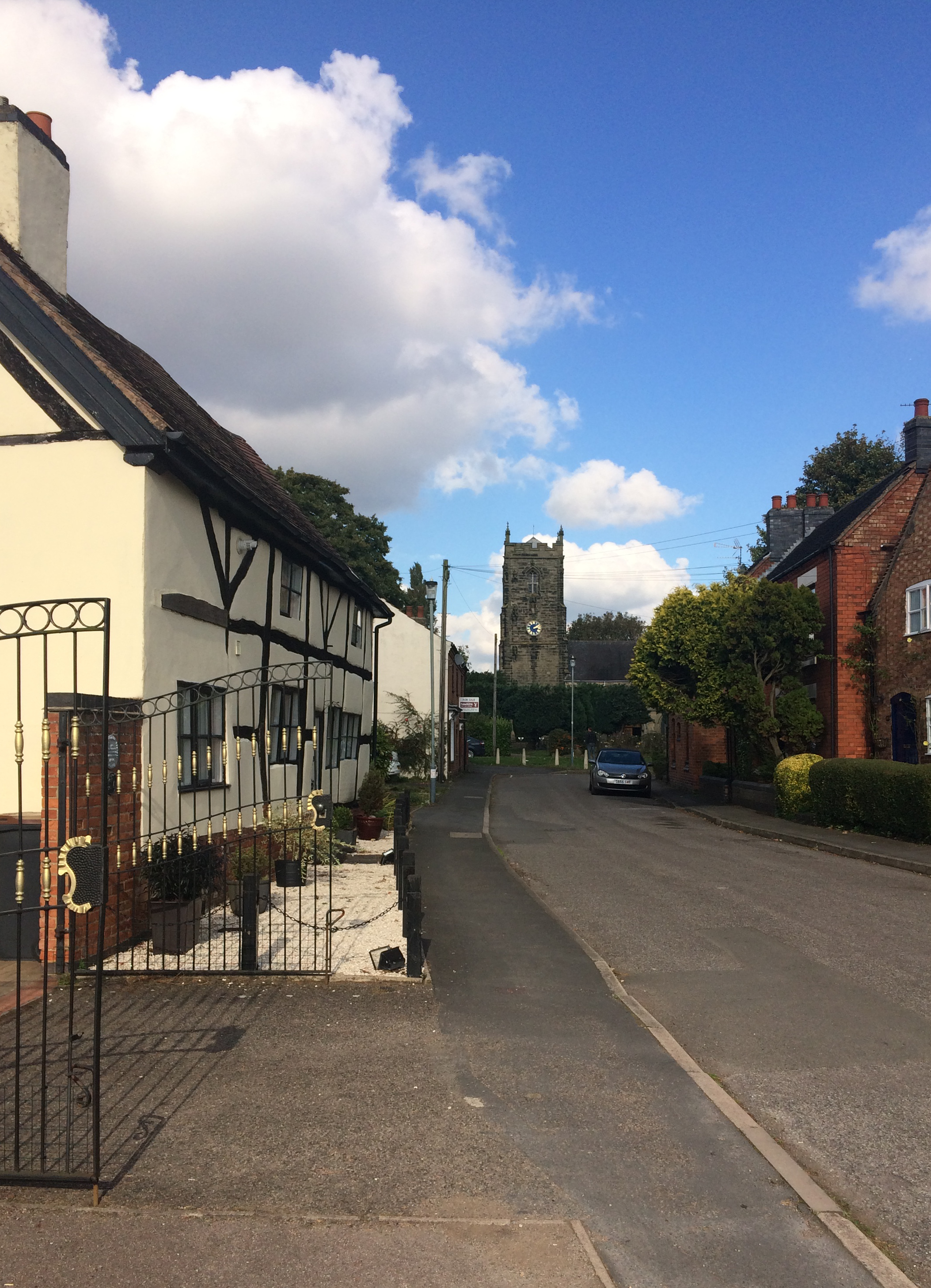
Church Street

=== Medieval ===
The early history of Bulkington can be traced in the Domesday Book of 1086, where it is mentioned as among the estates of the Count of Meulan, overseen by his sub-tenant Salo. Originally the parish of Bulkington consisted of two five-hide vills - in the south Bulkington and Barnacle, and in the North Marston, Weston and Bramcote. The first four of these were all held by the Count of Meulan. Bulkington was the largest of these sub-divisions (at 4 hides and 1 virgate) and functioned as the centre of the manor; however, by the late 13th century the centre of the manor had moved to Weston-in-Arden. By 1285 the manor of Weston contained Bulkington, Bramcote, Barnacle, Ryton, Clifton, and Wibtoft. The manor house Weston Hall, which dates to the 16th century, still stands in Weston-in Arden. It was substantially renovated in 1892, and after serving for a time as a night club in the 1970s and 1980s, it now functions as a hotel.

=== Early modern ===
Throughout the medieval period and until the late 18th century, the principal employment in Bulkington had been agriculture: 100 acres (0.40 km^{2}) of meadow land were recorded in 1086; further, windmills are recorded for Weston and Marston Jabbett, and a water mill in Bramcote. However, in 1766 700 acres (2.8 km^{2}) of common land were enclosed at Ryton, and 4 years later enclosure was applied to the remainder of land in Bulkington, totalling 1,600 acres (6.5 km^{2}). Because of this, ribbon weaving supplemented or replaced agriculture as the main source of income for the majority of Bulkington's population. This cottage industry had spread to Bulkington from the major centres of Coventry and Bedworth, where it had been introduced by the Huguenots in the 18th century.

The late 18th century and early 19th century was a period of significant growth for the village, with its population almost tripling in size. The 1830s saw a slump in the industry, due in part to the introduction of factory production at Coventry, and competition from cheap imports. However, the 1840s brought another period of growth when many buildings were re-fronted or rebuilt in chequered brick work (characteristic of North Warwickshire buildings of the period). The industry collapsed in the 1860s "when the Cobden treaty with France removed the duty on French silks entering England". This was accompanied by a depression in agriculture and led to a fall in the population by almost a third by 1891.

The Bulkington Baptismal register, 1841–1861, records that: 'On Thursday, 15 August 1861, six families comprising 27 members left for Quebec, Canada, in consequence of the continued depression of the Ribbon trade... . At the same time 83 houses were vacant in the parish. Robert Potter, Vicar'. Nonetheless, ribbon production continued in Bulkington into the middle of the 20th century, through small factory production rather than as a cottage industry. The last factory, in Arden Road, closed in the early 1950s.

In 1847 the Trent Valley Line was built near the village, and Bulkington railway station was opened. The station was closed in 1931.

=== Recent developments ===
Speculative private housing development began in the 1930s and by the 1960s surrounded the village with expansive suburban areas. In addition to the greenfield development of the 1960s, much of the village itself was redeveloped. This involved the creation of a shopping precinct in Leicester Street, which was the traditional heart of the village. Additionally, many of the chequered-pattern brick buildings were replaced by typical 1960s suburban houses. In 1968 a new east-west distributor road linking School Road and Bedworth Road replaced an ancient footpath.

This development divorced the Church from Church Street; further road developments led to the demolition of many of the buildings in the historic precinct, and by the 1980s only Church Street retained any historic continuity. The remaining historic buildings were threatened with demolition which led directly to the creation of the Bulkington Conservation Area in 1985, which covers Church Street and the area surrounding St James' Parish Church.

In November 2008 the Barbridge Close area, north of St James' Church, was excluded from the conservation area. St. James' is a Grade II listed building, along with two 19th-century chest tombs in the grounds. Numbers 3 and 4 Church Street, and the wrought iron railings on St James' are also afforded listed status.

== Governance ==
=== Political representation ===
Bulkington is a ward of the Nuneaton and Bedworth local government district which, like the other wards in the district, is represented by 2 councillors. Bulkington is represented by Richard Smith (Conservative Party) & Lubs Cvetkovic (Conservative Party). (Note: Desmond O'Brian is inconsistently identified as a Labour and Conservative councillor on Nuneaton and Bedworth Council's website: By 'Parish' By Ward. His councillor's profile page, however, lists him as Conservative.)

The Nuneaton and Bedworth district is a subdivision of the Warwickshire County Council, which is currently Conservative controlled. Bulkington elects a councillor to the county council along with part of Whitestone ward. They are currently represented by Jeff Morgan (Conservative).

Bulkington was part of the Nuneaton constituency in the House of Commons. However, following the changes to the Warwickshire parliamentary constituency boundaries which came into effect on 13 June 2007, and used for the first time at the 2010 general election, Bulkington was transferred into the Rugby constituency.

=== Civic history ===
In July 1850, Bulkington Local Board of Health was formed under the Public Health Act 1848, and in 1894 this was converted into an urban district council. From 1894 to 1932 Bulkington functioned as an independent urban district; however, the village lost its independence in 1932 under the Warwickshire Review Order, when it became part of the Rugby Rural District. Six years later, in 1938, it became part of Bedworth Urban District, which had been established in 1928.

From 1938 Bulkington was therefore treated as part of Bedworth for administrative purposes. An administrative oversight at the time of the 1938 order merging Bulkington into Bedworth Urban District meant that the civil parish of Bulkington nominally continued to exist as an urban parish until 1954, but did not have a parish council of its own, being administered by Bedworth Urban District Council. The two civil parishes of Bedworth and Bulkington merged in 1954 to create a single parish called Bedworth covering the whole area of Bedworth Urban District. In 1951 the parish had a population of 3240. In 1974 the Bedworth Urban District became part of the Nuneaton and Bedworth district, which was created by the Local Government Act 1972. No successor parish was created for Bedworth, and so it became an unparished area.

== Religion and church history ==
The 2001 Census records Bulkington's population as being predominantly Christian, with 84.7% of residents naming Christianity as their religion. 8.4% stated No Religion, 0.8% Other and 6.0% did not disclose. The village is served by four churches: the Anglican St James' Parish Church, Our Lady of the Sacred Heart Catholic Church, Ryton Methodist Church, and Bulkington Congregational Church.

=== Parish Church of St James ===
St James' is the oldest church in Bulkington, dating to the 12th century. The church was given to the Abbey of Leicester after its foundation in 1143. Following the Dissolution of the Monasteries the church came into the Crown's hands until 1554, when it was passed on and sold numerous times before returning to the Crown's possession by 1662. It has remained in the possession of the Crown since. Records for baptisms and burials begin in 1606 and for marriages in 1683. The church had chapels in Weston, Ryton, Marston, Bramcote, Shilton and Ansty; the latter two were transferred from the Abbey of Leicester to Coventry Priory, and subsequently became independent parishes. The rectory, "was acquired in 1587 by Robert Johnson, Archdeacon of Leicester, as part of the endowment of the grammar schools which he founded at Oakham and Uppingham".

The Old Vicarage, a Victorian Tudor-Gothic building lies to the north-east of the church; a modern, suburban style vicarage lies closer to the church. The church today "consists of a chancel with a vestry on the north; a nave, with a clearstory to the south only; north and south aisles; south porch; and a western tower". It displays a series of architectural developments from the 13th century through to the 20th, though the earliest material in the church dates from the 12th century, represented by a single voussoir and bell capital found in 1907 and built into the south porch. The tower was built in the mid-15th century and restored in 1907. The church has eight bells, the earliest of which belongs to the 16th century; these can be heard on Sundays, and during the week when the bell ringers practice.

=== Bulkington Congregational Church ===
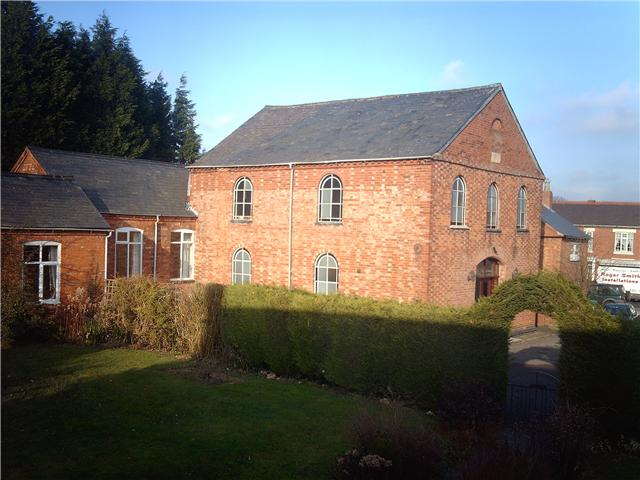
Bulkington Congregational Church

Little is known of the history of this church, as its records were recently destroyed in a fire. However, a plaque on the front gable of the building records that it was built in 1811 and restored in 1883, making it the second oldest church building in the village. Further, the records for births and baptisms from 1812 to 1836 are available in the Warwickshire County archive. The church is a rectangular, two-storey brick building with a balcony. A later, single storey extension from the south of the building serves as the church hall. The church manse is situated to the south of the church. It lay unoccupied for some time but has since been renovated and is now occupied by the new pastor and his wife who moved to the area in the summer of 2008.

=== Ryton Methodist Church ===
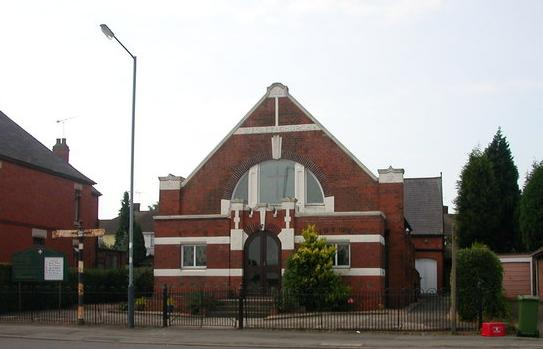
Ryton Methodist Church

There were originally two Methodist churches in the parish of Bulkington: Bulkington Methodist and Ryton Methodist. Ryton Methodist Church was initially situated in Long Street but moved to Rugby Road in 1911. A gazetteer from 1848 reports that there was a place of worship for Wesleyans in the parish, making the Methodist church (though not church building) the third oldest church in the village. Bulkington Methodist closed after 110 years on 12 October 1960 when the building had become unsafe; its congregation joined Ryton Methodist Church.

=== Our Lady of the Sacred Heart Catholic Church ===
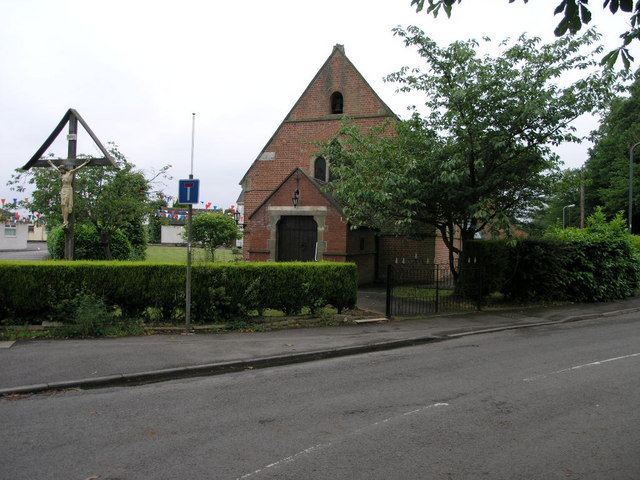
The Catholic Church

The presence of the (post-Reformation) Catholic Church in Bulkington begins in 1842 when Richard Brome de Bary, owner of Weston Hall, converted to Catholicism. He established a mission at his home, dedicated to Our Lady of Bethlehem. As well as Bulkington, the church also serves the nearby village of Wolvey. The parish belongs to the archdiocese of Birmingham. The church is a brick building in Gothic style and was built in 1869; it holds 150 people. Recent architectural additions include the extension of the sacristy, the building of a parish hall, and the erection of a grotto to the Virgin Mary. The church has held a bi-annual flower festival since 1990.

== Education ==
Bulkington has two schools: St James' Church of England Academy and Arden Forest Infant School, with a combined total of approximately 420 pupils. What is now St James' Church of England Junior School was built in 1959 as a 2-form entry school. In 1973, following the North Warwickshire primary school reorganisation plan, it became a Middle School and it was at this time that the school's name was changed to St James' Church of England Middle School. In 1996, the school was redesignated a junior school, returning it to its original status.

Arden Forest Infant School was founded in 1996 due to the Warwickshire reorganisation of schools and the subsequent amalgamation of Bulkington First School and Weston-in-Arden First School.

== Demography ==
At the 2001 census, the Bulkington ward, which includes Bulkington, Weston-in-Arden, Ryton, Marston Jabbett, Bramcote (west), had a total population of 6,303. There were 3,214 females (51.0%) and 3,089 males (49.0%). The largest age groups in the ward were: 45–59 (1,526, 24.2%); 30–44 (1,104, 17.5%); and 65–74 (873, 13.9%). The vast majority of residents are white: 6,236 (98.9%). The largest ethnic minority was Asian: 38 (0.60%).

Population change in Bulkington since 1751
Year	1751	1848	1911	1921	1931	1951	2001
Population	c.750	1,831	1,837	2,616	2,747	3,240	6,303
1751 figure is an estimate by Wyman (1981)

Bulkington Compared
2001 UK Census	Bulkington	Nuneaton and Bedworth	West Midlands	England
Total population	6,303	119,132	5,267,308	49,138,831
Christian	84.72%	76.94%	72.58%	71.74%
No Religion	8.36%	11.72%	12.30%	14.59%
Sikh	0.30%	1.50%	1.97%	0.67%
Hindu	0.25%	0.60%	1.08%	1.11%
Buddhist	0.14%	0.09%	0.19%	0.28%
Muslim	0.05%	1.58%	4.10%	3.10%

Bulkington Compared
2001 UK Census	Bulkington	Nuneaton and Bedworth	West Midlands	England
Total population	6,303	119,132	5,267,308	49,138,831
Population Density	4.60p/ha	15.09p/ha	4.05p/ha	3.77p/ha
White	98.9%	95.1%	88.7%	90.9%
Asian	0.60%	3.80%	7.32%	4.57%
Median Age Below 75 years old	54	36	36	36
Over 75 years old	9.51%	6.57%	6.23%	7.54%

== Notable residents ==
- Laura Bassett (born 1983) - former footballer
- Harry King Goode (1892 – 1942) - World War I flying ace
- Laura Harvey (born 1980) - football manager
- Richard Hayward (1725–1800) - sculptor
- William Perkins (1558–1602) - theologian

== Sources ==
- Allen, G. (2000) Warwickshire Towns & Villages, Sigma Leisure ISBN 1-85058-642-X
- 'Wyman, P. (1981) Bulkington Through the Ages
