= William Jemmat =

William Jemmat (died 1678), also William Jemmet, was an English Puritan cleric and author.

== Life ==
Born about 1596, Jemmat was from a prosperous family of Reading, Berkshire. His mother Elizabeth Grove was buried, at the age of 81, in the churchyard of St Giles' Church, Reading, on 22 March 1650, was described in the parish register as the "pious mother of three Jemmats, vicars of the parish successively".

Educated at Reading grammar school, Jemmat went to Magdalen College, Oxford in 1610, and graduated B.A. there on 23 May 1614. Before he took his M.A., 25 February 1617, he moved to Magdalen Hall, and shortly afterwards was ordained priest (15 June).

Jemmat then spent a period in Reading, and married. While there he may have acted as an assistant to Thomas Taylor. He moved to Lechlade in Gloucestershire, where he described himself as preacher of God's word (1624). About 1626 he became a licensed lecturer at Isleworth, Middlesex, confirmed by William Laud in 1632.

By appointment of the House of Commons, Jemmat in 1642–3 was lecturer at Dunstable and Kingston upon Thames, and in the neighbourhood of Faversham. He became rector of Nettlestead, Kent, in 1643, a living he held to 1647, then returning to Isleworth as preacher.

Jemmat became vicar of St Giles's, Reading, by grant of the House of Lords under the great seal, 20 December 1648; the former vicar, Jemmat's elder brother John, had been buried in the church on 10 December 1648. At the English Restoration of 1660 Jemmat conformed, and retained his benefice for the rest of his life. He died at Reading on 28 Jan 1678, and was buried in the chancel of St Giles's Church on 31 January.

== Works ==
Jemmat published:

- A Spiritual Trumpet exciting and preparing to the Christian Warfare, sounded first in the utmost parts of the Lord's Camp to one Wing of the Army, now in the midst for the benefit of all. By Wm. Jemmat, M.A., preacher of God's Word at Lechlade in Gloucestershire, London, 1624.
- A Watchword for Kent, exhorting God's People to stir themselves up out of Security, London, 1643.
- The Rock, or a settled Heart in unsettled Times … being the Heads of some Sermons preached lately by William Jemmat, pastor of Nettlestead, co. Kent, London, 1644.
- A Practical Exposition of the Historical Prophecy of Jonah, London, 1666.
- Now and Ever, London, 1666.

His individual sermons were published in 1623, 1624, 1627, 1628, 1643, and 1644. He also edited works of Thomas Taylor 1576–1633, beginning with A Mappe of Rome (five sermons, 1620). He abridged John Preston's works (An Abridgement of Dr Preston's Works 1648); and edited Paul Baynes's Commentary upon the whole Epistle of Paul to the Ephesians, London, 1656. According to Anthony Wood, he also translated works of Thomas Goodwin into Latin.

== Family ==
On 11 October 1619 Jemmat married Anne Pocock at St Giles's Church, Reading. They had four surviving sons and two daughters.

== Notes ==
Attribution

This article incorporates text from a publication now in the public domain: Lee, Sidney, ed. (1892). "Jemmat, William". Dictionary of National Biography. Vol. 29. London: Smith, Elder & Co.
