= Thomas Shelton (stenographer) =

English stenographer

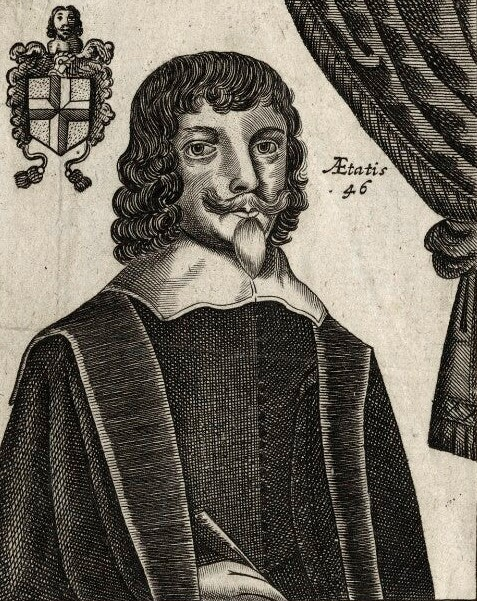
Thomas Shelton – 1646

Thomas Shelton (c. 1600–c. 1650) was an English stenographer and inventor of a much-used British 17th- and 18th-century shorthand.

== Life ==
The 1647 edition of Thomas Shelton's Tachygraphie contains a portrait giving his age as 46, implying that he was born in 1600/01. Nothing sure is known about his origin and education, but it was supposed that he came from the well-known Shelton family which owned much land in Norfolk. In the English Civil War (1642–49), Shelton stood on the side of the Parliament; his religious sympathies were for Puritanism.

Thomas Shelton made his living from shorthand, teaching the subject in London over a period of thirty years while he developed his stenographical systems. Shelton knew the stenography of John Willis and took over its geometrical basic principle for his own shorthand. He published several books about shorthand which he sold from his house.

== Shelton's shorthand ==
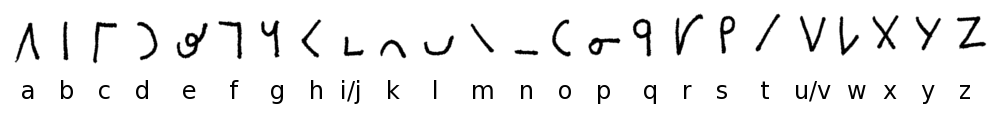
Thomas Shelton's Tachygraphy shorthand alphabet

Shelton invented a new stenographical system and published it in 1626 in the book Short-Writing (in later editions since 1635 called "Tachygraphy", Ancient Greek for "speedy writing"). In Shelton's shorthand system every consonant was expressed by an easy symbol which sometimes still resembled the alphabetical letter.

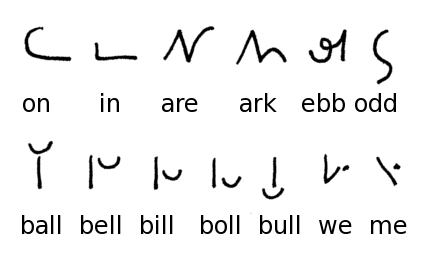
Vocalisation of Shelton shorthand

The vowels were designated by the height of the following consonant. Thus the B symbol with the L symbol written directly above meant "ball", while the B symbol with the L symbol below meant "bull". The B symbol with the L symbol on top right meant "bell", in the middle right "bill", below on the right "boll". A vowel at the word end was designated by a point in the suitable position. For initial vowels there were additional symbols. There were other symbols for frequent prefixes and suffixes as well as for consonant connections.

A disadvantage of Shelton's shorthand was that vowels and diphthongs were not always distinguished (see "Tachygraphy" for details). For example, the symbols for "bat" could mean "bait" or "bate" as well, and the symbols for "bot" could mean "boot" or "boat" as well. This can only be decided from the context. An advantage of his system was that it could be easily learnt. Therefore, between 1626 and 1710 more than 20 editions of his "Tachygraphy" were printed. German issues appeared between 1679 and 1743 and a French issue in Paris in 1681.

Shelton's Tachygraphy was used, amongst others, by Samuel Pepys, John Byrom and US-President Thomas Jefferson.

In the year of his death, 1650, Shelton published yet another shorthand system called "Zeiglographia", which did not become as widespread as his "Tachygraphy", although it did go through 10 editions between 1650 and 1687. Zeiglographia was the system used by Sir Isaac Newton in his notebooks, as well as by Thomas Bayes.

== Influence ==
Shelton's Tachygraphy was taken up and adapted by later proponents of shorthand systems: Thomas Arkisden, Theophilus Metcalfe, and Charles Aloysius Ramsay. Elisha Coles adapted Zeiglographia.

== Literature ==
- Henderson, Frances. "Shelton, Thomas". Oxford Dictionary of National Biography (online ed.). Oxford University Press. doi:10.1093/ref:odnb/25319. (Subscription, Wikipedia Library access or UK public library membership required.). The first edition of this text is available at Wikisource: "Shelton, Thomas (1601-1650?)" . Dictionary of National Biography. London: Smith, Elder & Co. 1885–1900.
- Alexander Tremaine Wright: Thomas Shelton, tachygrapher. London 1896. 24 pages.
