= Elizabeth Batts Cook =

Wife and widow of Captain James Cook (1742–1835)

Elizabeth Cook
- Born: Elizabeth Batts; 4 February 1742; Wapping, Middlesex, England
- Died: 13 May 1835 (aged 93); Clapham, Surrey, England
- Resting place: St Andrew the Great, Cambridge, England
- Spouse: James Cook (m. 1762; died 1779)
- Children: 6

Elizabeth Cook (née Batts; 4 February 1742 – 13 May 1835) was the wife, and, for more than 50 years, widow, of Captain James Cook.

== Biography ==
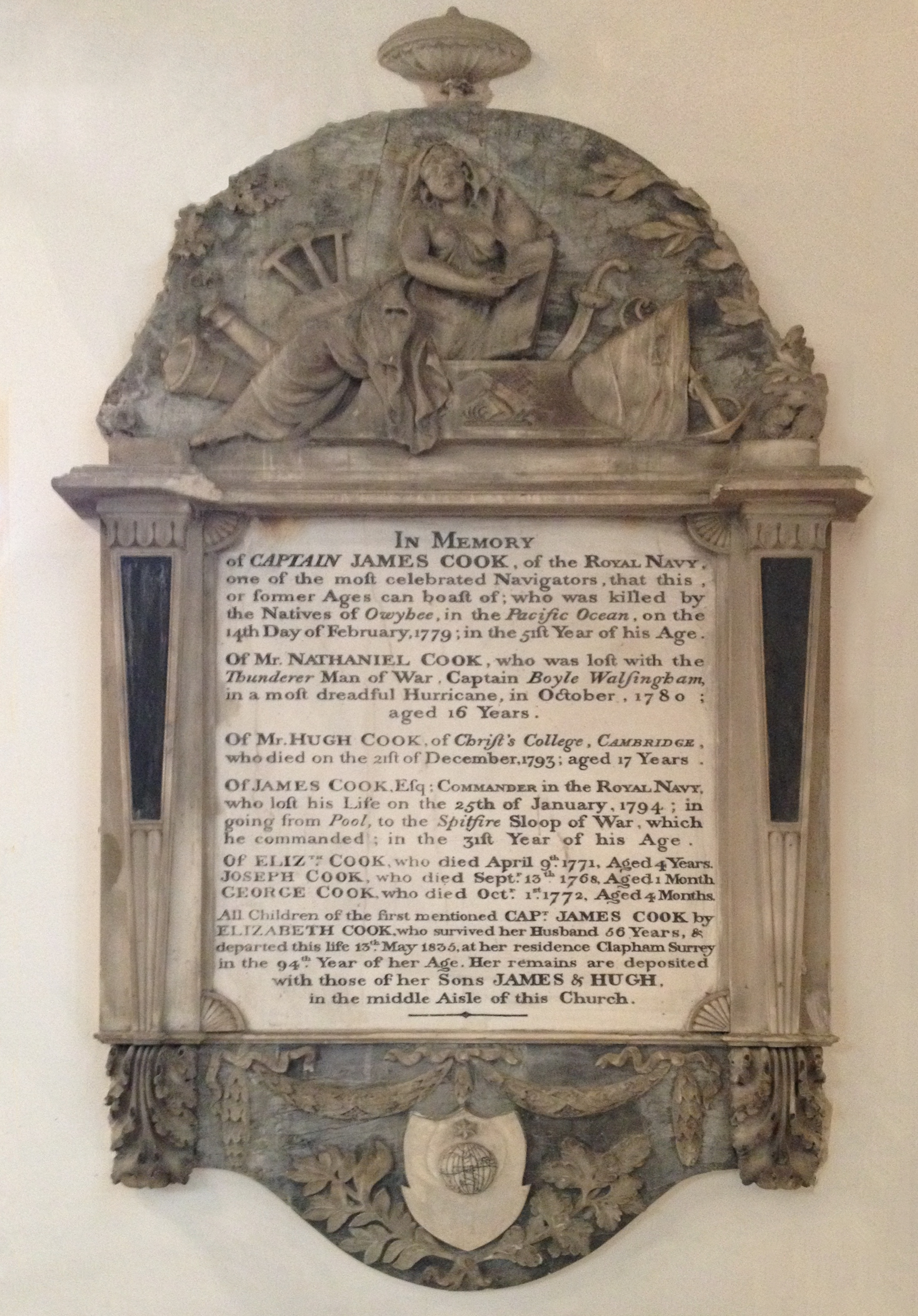
Memorial to James Cook and family in St Andrew the Great, Cambridge

Elizabeth Batts was the daughter of Samuel Batts who was keeper of the Bell Inn at Execution Dock, Wapping. Samuel Batts was one of Cook's mentors.

She married James Cook at St Margaret's Church, Barking, Essex on 21 December 1762. Cook (1728–1779) was then a master in the Royal Navy but had not yet held his first independent command.

The couple had six children: James (1763–94), Nathaniel (1764–80, lost aboard HMS Thunderer which foundered with all hands in a hurricane in the West Indies), Elizabeth (1767–71), Joseph (1768–68), George (1772–72) and Hugh (1776–93), the last of whom died of scarlet fever while a student at Christ's College, Cambridge. When not at sea, Cook lived in the East End of London and the family attended St Paul's Church, Shadwell, where their son James was baptised. After her husband was killed at Kealakekua Bay, Hawaii in 1779, Elizabeth Cook received an annual pension of £200 from the Admiralty. In 1788, she moved to Clapham, Surrey.

Outliving her husband and children, she died at Clapham on 13 May 1835 at the age of 93. Elizabeth Cook is buried in the central aisle of St Andrew the Great Church, Cambridge with her sons, James and Hugh. She left a bequest to pay the minister, support five poor aged women of the parish and to maintain the family's monument. The 'Charity of Mrs Elizabeth Cook', set up under her will, was registered until 4 May 2021 when assets were transferred to the parochial church council.

Cook has no known direct descendants; all her recorded children predeceased her and died without issue.

== Memorials ==
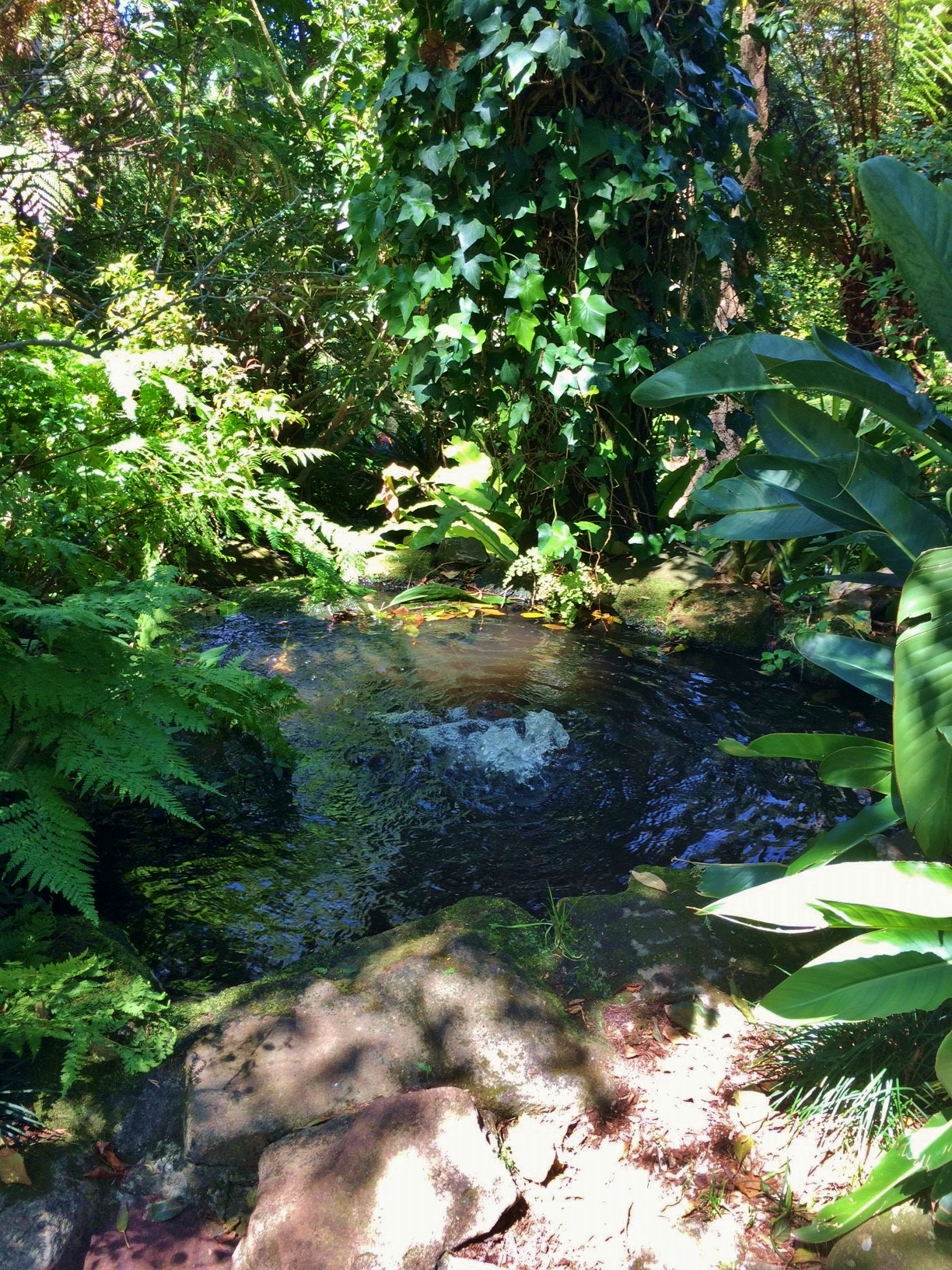
Elizabeth Cook memorial fountain Caringbah South, Australia

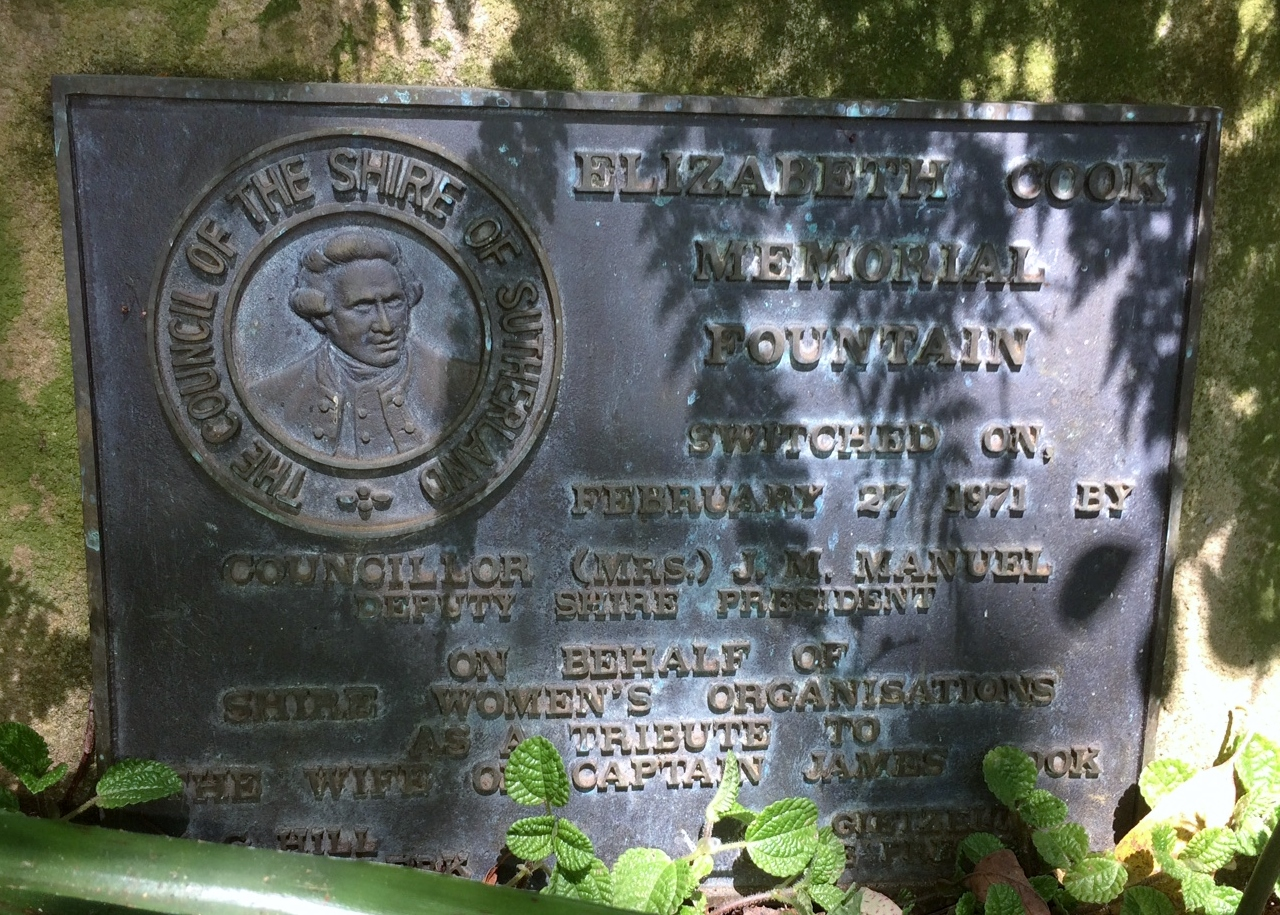
Elizabeth Cook dedication plaque Caringbah South, Australia

=== Family monument ===
The Cook family monument is situated in the chancel of St Andrew the Great, Cambridge, where Elizabeth, and Hugh and James Cook, are buried. The monument reads as follows:

In Memory of CAPTAIN JAMES COOK, of the Royal Navy. One of the most celebrated Navigators, that this or former Ages can boast of; who was killed by the Natives of Owyhee, in the Pacific Ocean, on the 14th Day of February, 1779: in the 51st Year of his Age.

Of Mr. NATHANIEL COOK, who was lost with the Thunderer Man of War. Captain Boyle Walsingham, in a most dreadful Hurricane, in October, 1780: aged 16 Years.

Of Mr. HUGH COOK, of Christ's College, Cambridge, who died on the 21st of December, 1793: aged 17 Years.

Of JAMES COOK, Esq.: Commander in the Royal Navy, who lost his Life on the 25th of January, 1794; in going from Pool, to the Spitfire Sloop of War, which he commanded: in the 31st Year of his Age.

Of ELIZTH COOK, who died April 9th 1771, Aged 4 Years.

JOSEPH COOK, who died Sept^{R} 13th 1768, Aged 1 Month.

GEORGE COOK, who died Oct^{R} 1st 1772, Aged 4 Months.

All Children of the first mentioned CAP^{N}. JAMES COOK, by ELIZABETH COOK, who survived her Husband 56 Years, & departed this life 13th May 1835, at her residence Clapham Surrey in the 94th Year of her Age. Her remains are deposited with those of her Sons JAMES & HUGH in the middle Aisle of this Church.

=== Memorial fountain ===
A small memorial garden fountain was dedicated to Elizabeth Batts Cook on 27 February 1971 within the grounds of the E. G. Waterhouse National Camellia Garden at Caringbah South, NSW, Australia. This garden is located within the Sutherland Shire, which also contains the place of Captain Cook's first landing on continental Australia at Botany Bay on 29 April 1770.

The fountain is accompanied by a dedication plaque and a separate "storyboard" plaque which provides details of the life of Elizabeth Batts Cook. The text on the plaque reads:

This fountain commemorates the life of Elizabeth Cook, wife of the famous navigator Captain James Cook. It is believed to be the only monument in the world to this woman of formidable courage and character.

Born Elizabeth Batts in 1742, she married James Cook on 21 December 1762 when she was 20 and he was 34 and already making a name for himself in the Navy.

They were married for 17 years but lived together only about four years in total in between Captain Cook's three epic voyages of discovery. They had six children, two of whom died as infants: George aged four months and Joseph one month. Their only daughter Elizabeth died at the age of four.

Captain Cook's death in February 1779 heralded a string of tragedies for Mrs Cook. Eight months later their son Nathaniel, 15, was lost at sea when his ship went down in a hurricane. Her remaining sons, Hugh, 17 and James, 31 died within weeks of one another in December 1793 and January 1794 – Hugh of scarlet fever at Cambridge, where he was a student, and James a Commander of the Royal Navy, who drowned.

The shock of these deaths confined Mrs Cook to her bed for two years and forever afterwards she observed four days of solemn fasting on the anniversaries of her bereavements, staying in her room praying and meditating with her husband's Bible.

Mrs Cook was known to be a skilled needlewoman and at the time of her husband's death in Hawaii she was embroidering a waistcoat for him to wear at court. The unfinished garment is exhibited at the Mitchell Library in Sydney along with Cook's relics, including the original grant for Captain Cook's coat of arms, awarded posthumously to his descendants in 1785.

Mrs Cook lived for another 56 years after her husband's death, and one of her proudest possessions was a gold medal, struck in his honour by the Royal Society. Her portrait, painted when she was 81, depicts a handsome, venerable lady with an oval face and an aquiline nose dressed, as always, in black satin. She wore a ring with a lock of her husband's hair in it and she entertained the highest respect for his memory, measuring everything by his standard of honour and morality. Her keenest expression of disapprobation was that Mr Cook – to her he was always Mr Cook, not Captain Cook – would never have done.

Before her death on 13 May 1835 at the age of 93, Mrs Cook went to great lengths to destroy all her private papers and correspondence with her beloved husband, considering them too sacred for other eyes. She was buried in the family vault at Great St Andrew's Church, Cambridge, between two of her sons.
