= William Ames =

English Puritan minister (1576–1633)

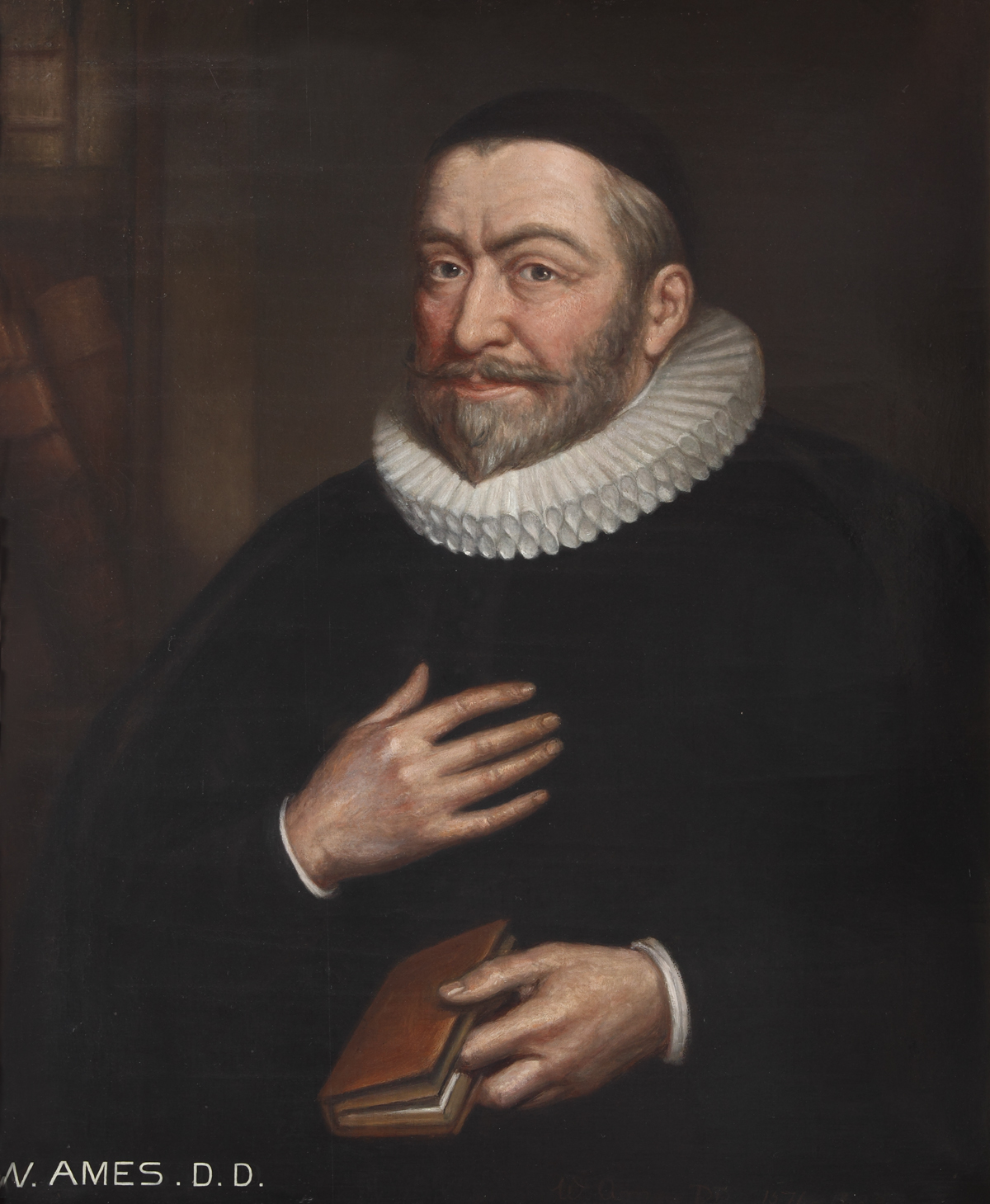
William Ames, theologian (1576–1633)

William Ames (/eɪmz/; Latin: Guilielmus Amesius; 1576 – 14 November 1633) was an English Puritan minister, philosopher, and controversialist. He spent much time in the Netherlands, and is noted for his involvement in the controversy between the Calvinists and the Arminians.

== Early life and education ==
Ames was born at Ipswich, and was brought up by a maternal uncle, Robert Snelling of Boxford. He was educated at the local grammar school and from 1594 at Christ's College, Cambridge. He was considerably influenced by his tutor at Christ's, William Perkins, and by his successor Paul Bayne. Ames graduated BA in 1598 and MA in 1601, and was chosen for a fellowship in Christ's College.

He was popular in the university, and in his own college. One of Ames's sermons became historical in the Puritan controversies. It was delivered in the university Church of St Mary the Great, Cambridge on 21 December 1609, and in it he rebuked sharply "lusory lotts" and the "heathenish debauchery" of the students during the Twelve Days of Christmas.

A partisan election, however, had led to the mastership at Christ's going to Valentine Carey. He quarrelled with Ames for disapproving of the surplice and other outward symbols. Ames's vehemence led to his being summoned before the Vice-Chancellor, who suspended him "from the exercise of his ecclesiastical function and from all degrees taken or to be taken."

== Ministry in Holland ==
He left Cambridge, and was offered a lecturer position at Colchester, but George Abbot, the Bishop of London, went against the wishes of the local corporation, and refused to grant institution and induction. Similar rebuffs awaited him elsewhere, and he travelled with Robert Parker to the Netherlands, helped by English merchants who wished him to controvert the supporters of the English church in Leiden. At Rotterdam, he debated with Grevinchovius (Nicholas Grevinckhoven, died 1632), minister of the Arminian party, with reasoning from Philippians ii. 13, "It is God that worketh in us both to will and to do." This dispute made his name in the Netherlands.

Subsequently, Ames entered into a controversy in print with Grevinchovius on universal redemption and election, and cognate problems. He brought together all he had maintained in his Coronis ad Collationem Hagiensem (A Finishing Touch to the Hague Conference) - his major book. At Leiden, Ames became intimate with Hugh Goodyear, pastor of the English church there. He was sent for to The Hague by Sir Horatio Vere, the English governor of Brill, who appointed him a minister in the army of the states-general, and of the English soldiers in their service. He married a daughter of John Burges, who was Vere's chaplain, and, on his father-in-law's return to England, succeeded to his place.

It was at this time he began his controversy with Simon Episcopius, who, in attacking the Coronis, railed against the author as having been "a disturber of the public peace in his native country, so that the English magistrates had banished him thence; and now, by his late printed Coronis, he was raising new disturbances in the peaceable Netherlands." Episcopius was rebutted by Goodyear, who became a defender of Ames against the Remonstrants, and later provided Nethenus with material for his biography of Ames.

The Coronis had been primarily prepared for the Synod of Dort, which sat from 13 November 1618 until 9 May 1619. At this synod the position of Ames was anomalous. The High Church party in England had induced Vere to dismiss him from the chaplaincy; but he was still held in reverence. It was arranged he should attend the synod, and he was retained by the Calvinist party at four florins a day to watch the proceedings. He was adviser to Johannes Bogerman, the synod's president.

== Academic ==
A proposal to make him principal of a theological college at Leiden was frustrated by Archbishop Abbot; and when later invited by the state of Friesland to a professoriate at Franeker, the opposition was renewed, but this time abortively. He was installed at Franeker on 7 May 1622 and delivered a discourse on the occasion on Urim and Thummim. He brought renown to Franeker as professor, preacher, pastor and theological writer; one student of the period influenced by Ames was Johannes Cocceius. Another student was Nathaniel Eaton, later of Harvard College.

He prepared his Medulla Theologiae (The Marrow of Theology), a manual of Calvinistic doctrine, for his students. Ames was much influenced in terms of method by Ramism, and opposed the residual teaching of Aristotle. His De Conscientia, ejus Jure et Casibus (1632), an attempt to bring Christian ethics into clear relation with particular cases of conduct and of conscience, was a new thing in Protestantism.

== Move to Rotterdam ==
Having continued twelve years at Franeker (where he was rector in 1626), his health gave way, and he contemplated a move to New England. But another door was opened for him, with an invitation to Rotterdam. There he prepared his Fresh Suit against Ceremonies - the book which made Richard Baxter a Nonconformist. It sums up the issues between the Puritan school and that of Richard Hooker, and was posthumously published.

Having caught a cold from a flood which inundated his house, he died in November 1633, at the age of fifty-seven, apparently in needy circumstances.

== Family ==
Ames was married twice. His second wife was Joan Fletcher, and they had two sons and a daughter. The family emigrated to Massachusetts in 1637; the sons later returned to England. Their daughter Ruth (b. 1619) married Edmund Angier in Cambridge, Massachusetts; in 1680, their son Samuel Angier (1655-1719) married Hannah Oakes, the daughter of Urian Oakes.

== Influence ==
His works, which the Biographia Britannica (1778) testifies were known over Europe, were collected at Amsterdam in five volumes. Only a small proportion was translated into English. Ames' thought was particularly influential in New England.

== Notes ==
Attribution:

== Sources ==
- Keith L. Sprunger, The Learned Doctor William Ames (1972)
- See also:
  - John Quick's manuscript Icones Sacrae Anglicanae, which gives the fisherman anecdote on the personal authority of one who was present;
  - Life by Matthias Nethenus prefixed to collected edition of Latin works (5 vols, Amsterdam, 1658);
  - Winwood's Memorials, vol. iii. pp. 346–347;
  - Daniel Neal's Puritans, i. 532;
  - Thomas Fuller's Cambridge (Christ's College);
  - Hanbury's Hist. Memorials, i. 533;
  - Collections of the Massachusetts Historical Society, vol. vi., fourth series, 1863, pp. 576–577.
- Sprunger, Keith L. "Ames, William (1576–1633)". Oxford Dictionary of National Biography (online ed.). Oxford University Press. doi:10.1093/ref:odnb/440. (Subscription, Wikipedia Library access or UK public library membership required.)
