= Elisha Coles (Calvinist) =

English college servant and official

Elisha Coles (1608?–1688) was an English college servant and official in the University of Oxford, known as the author of a Calvinist theological work.

== Life ==
Originally in trade in London, Coles had by 1651 moved to Oxford, on 23 May of the year acting as deputy-registrar to the parliamentary visitors there, in the absence of Ralph Austen, the registrar. In 1657 Coles became steward of Magdalen College, through the favour of Thomas Goodwin, the intruded President, and was also manciple of Magdalen Hall. He was also active on the committee for "scandalous ministers" for Oxfordshire, with Joshua Cross and John Palmer who were intruded heads of house in the university.

Coles lost his posts after the Restoration of 1660. He obtained a place as clerk to the East India Company. According to Anthony Wood, Coles "died in his house in Scalding Alley, near the Stocks Market in London, about 28 Oct. 1688, aged eighty years or more."

== Works ==
Coles wrote A Practical Discourse of God's Sovereignty: with other Material Points deriving thence, London, printed by Ben Griffin for E. C., 1673. It enjoyed popularity among English Dissenters, and went through numerous editions. The third impression (1678) was preceded by recommendatory epistles from Thomas Goodwin and other well-known Puritan divines. Andrew Kippis wrote that reading this book at the age of 14 convinced him, contrary to its intention, of the illogical character of Calvinism.

== Family ==
By his wife, Elizabeth, Coles had a son, Elisha, whom he apprenticed. Elisha Coles the lexicographer was not this son, but a nephew. The son or the nephew published rhymes entitled Χριστολογία, or a Metrical Paraphrase on the History of our Lord and Saviour Jesus Christ; the Oxford Dictionary of National Biography suspends judgement.

== Notes ==
Attribution

This article incorporates text from a publication now in the public domain: Stephen, Leslie, ed. (1887). "Coles, Elisha (1608?-1688)". Dictionary of National Biography. Vol. 11. London: Smith, Elder & Co.
