= St Andrew the Great =

Coordinates: 52.205°N 0.1217°E

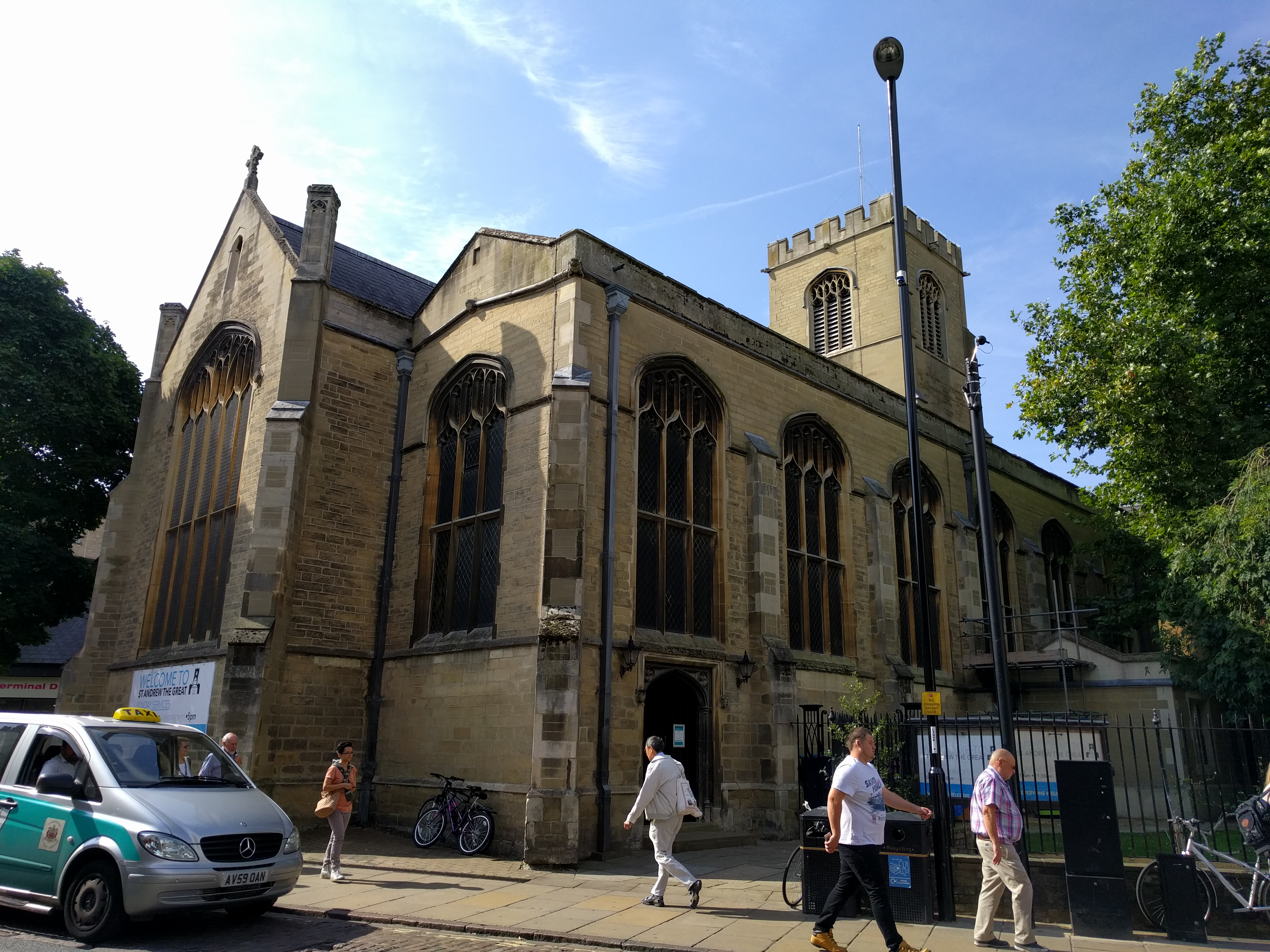
- St Andrew the Great
- OS grid reference: TL 45086 58428
- Country: England
- Denomination: Church of England
- Churchmanship: Low Church / Conservative Evangelical
- Website: stag.org

Administration
- Diocese: Diocese of Ely

Clergy
- Bishop: The Rt Revd Rob Munro (AEO)
- Vicar: Alasdair Paine

St Andrew the Great is a Church of England parish church in central Cambridge. Rebuilt in late Gothic style in 1843, it is a Grade II listed building. The church has a conservative evangelical tradition. The congregation includes Cambridge residents, overseas visitors and students.

== History ==
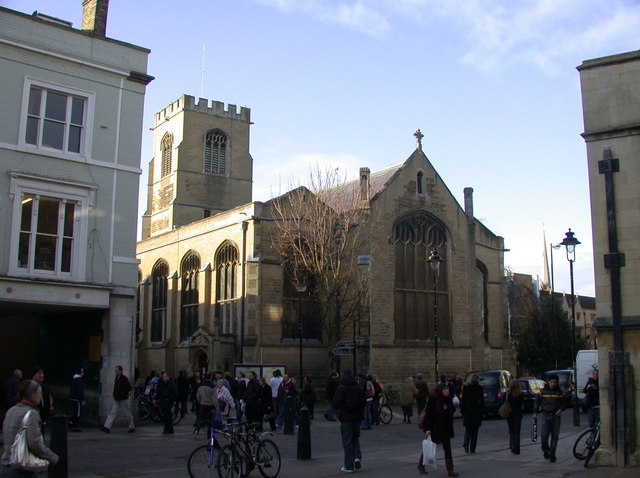
The church from St Andrew's Street, Cambridge

A church on the site of St Andrew the Great is first mentioned by name in 1200, and is possibly recorded in the Domesday Book of 1086. Little is known of the first building, which was probably a wooden structure, and was replaced with a more substantial stone building in the early 13th century, which was given to the Diocese of Ely in 1225-1228 by Absolom, the then rector. During the 16th century the church was a centre of Reformation preaching, with William Perkins serving as a "lecturer" from 1585 until his death in 1602, when he was succeeded by Paul Baynes and Ralph Cudworth.

By 1650 the medieval church building was in a poor state, and it was suggested that the parish be merged with that of Holy Trinity; it was however rebuilt largely at the expense of Christopher Rose (twice Mayor of Cambridge, in 1637 and 1654). Thomas Tenison, Archbishop of Canterbury from 1694, was curate of St Andrew's from 1662, where he set an example by his devoted attention to sufferers of the plague. Temple Chevallier, the theologian and astronomer, was curate and then vicar from 1822 until 1835.

To accommodate a growing congregation, the church was entirely rebuilt in 1842–3 in a 15th-century East Anglian style by the architect Ambrose Poynter. It was rebuilt with a nave of five bays with side aisles and a west tower of four stages; the south porch and vestries were added later in the 19th century. It does however retain elements of the earlier structure including early 12th-century double capitals in the heating chamber and some wall memorials, notably that of Captain James Cook and his family.

=== The Cook memorial ===
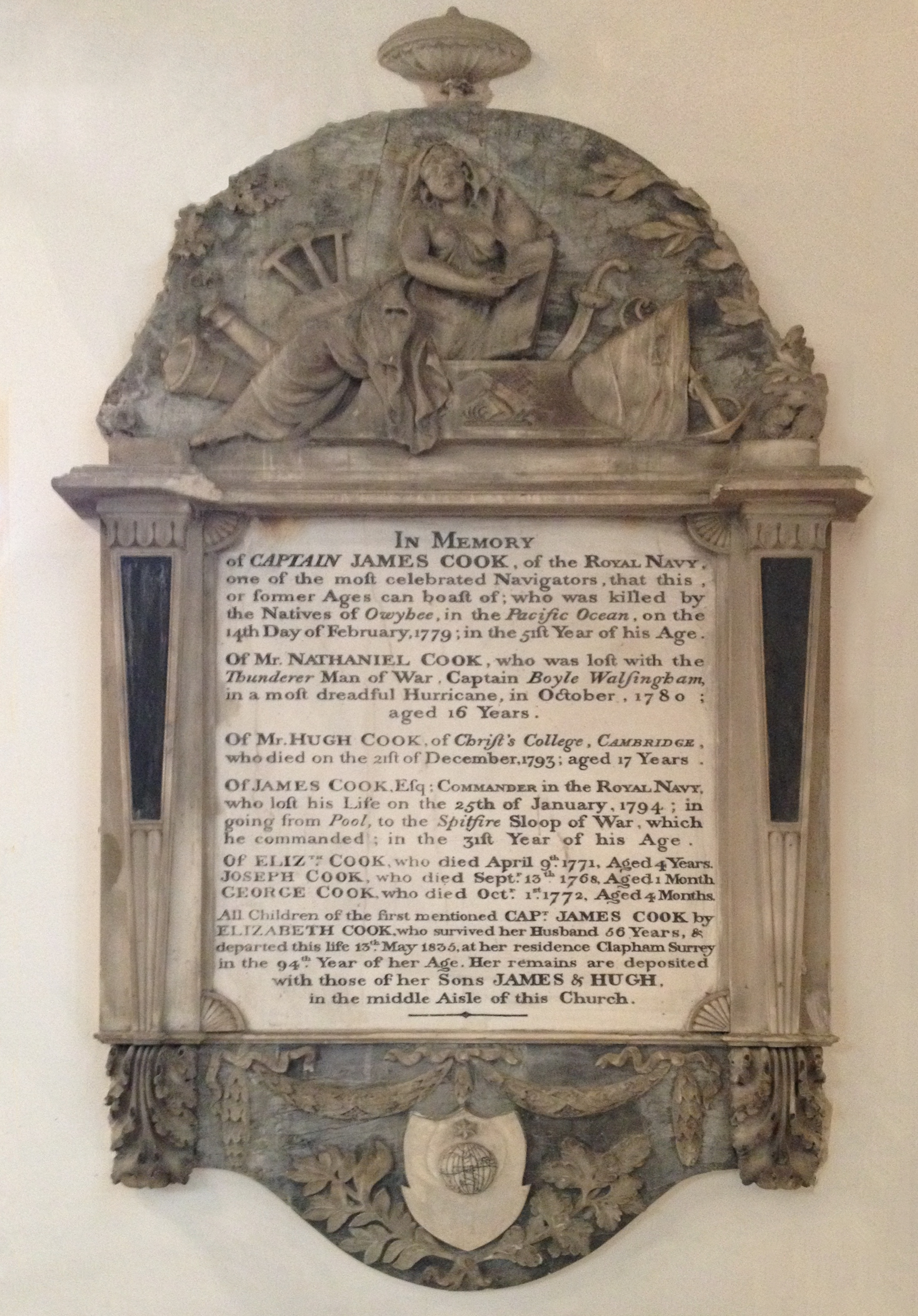
The Cook memorial

The church building contains a number of memorial tablets, most notably one of the explorer Captain James Cook and his family. The memorial records Captain Cook, his wife Elizabeth, and their six children. Elizabeth died in 1835, aged 93, and was predeceased by all of her children; she is buried in the church alongside two of her sons, James and Hugh. She left a bequest to pay the minister, support five poor aged women of the parish and to maintain the monument. The 'Charity of Mrs Elizabeth Cook', set up under her will, was registered until 2021 when assets were transferred to the parochial church council of Holy Trinity.

=== Recent history ===
St Andrew's was declared redundant in 1984 as the parish population had dwindled. However, the congregation of the nearby Holy Sepulchre Church ('the Round Church'), was looking for a new home as growth of the congregation had led them to run out of space. They raised the money to renovate St Andrew's, installing a new gallery, baptistry and rooms, and moved there in 1994. The parish associated with the church is now called Holy Sepulchre with All Saints. The Round Church is still used occasionally and is leased to Christian Heritage for exhibitions and training courses.

The church has been involved in three church 'grafting' schemes, to All Saints', Little Shelford (1997), Christ Church Cambridge (2004) and St Matthew's, Cambridge (2008). In each case a minister on the staff moved with a substantial number in the congregation to join the existing congregation in those places. In 2018, the church was also involved in 'planting' a new church in Huntingdon.

== Present day ==
The church is open for public services every Sunday: 09:30am, 11;15am (during University term time) and 5pm. Services are about an hour in length, with a strong emphasis on Bible teaching. There are six age-banded Sunday school groups for children and evening meetings for undergraduates (Tuesdays), 20s-30s (Wednesdays), internationals (Thursdays), and teenagers (Fridays and Sundays).

The church is within the conservative evangelical tradition of the Church of England. The parish has passed resolutions to reject the ordination and/or leadership of women, and it receives alternative episcopal oversight from the Bishop of Ebbsfleet (currently Rob Munro). The church participated in the Anglican Reform network until it was absorbed into Church Society and continues to participate in the ReNew network of churches.

== Clergy ==
=== Vicars ===
The following men have served as vicar of St Andrew the Great (or Holy Sepulchre before the move) since 1955:

- 1955–1987: Mark Ruston
- 1987–2010: Mark Ashton
- 2011–present: Alasdair Paine.

=== Earlier ministers ===
- William Perkins: lecturer from 1585 to 1602, theologian and Fellow of Christ's College
- Paul Baynes: lecturer from 1602, theologian and Fellow of Christ's College
- Ralph Cudworth: lecturer from 1602, theologian and Fellow of Emmanuel College
- Thomas Tenison: curate from 1662 to 1667, later Archbishop of Canterbury
- Temple Chevallier: curate from 1822, later Professor of Astronomy at the University of Durham

=== Curates ===
==== Under Mark Ruston ====
- David Watson: curate from 1962 to 1965, later vicar of St Michael le Belfrey, York
- John Williams (1965–66)
- David Huggett (1970–73)
- Jonathan Fletcher (1973–76), later minister of Emmanuel, Wimbledon, later disgraced
- Alfred Lennon (1974–77)
- Michael Nazir-Ali (1974–76), later Bishop of Rochester, later converted to Roman Catholicism
- Roger Combes (1977–86), later Archdeacon of Horsham
- Nigel Holmes (1978–80)
- Giles Walter (1986–93), later Vicar of St John's, Tunbridge Wells

==== Under Mark Ashton ====
- Christopher Ash (1993–97), led a church graft to All Saints, Little Shelford
- CJ Davis (1994-2000), later rector in Tooting and Crewkerne
- Carrie Sandom (1996-2005)
- Simon Scott (1998-2005), later rector of All Saints, Little Shelford
- Steve Midgley (2001-2004), led a church graft to Christ Church Cambridge
- Frank Price (2004-2008), led a church graft to St Matthew's Cambridge
- Brian Elfick (2006-2012), later minister in Toxteth and Kensington
- James Poole (2007-2014), later director of Wycliffe Bible Translators
- Nathan Buttery (2009-2017), later vicar of All Saints Preston

==== Under Alasdair Paine ====
- Rich Alldritt (2013–18), later vicar of St Thomas Oakwood
- Charlie Newcombe (2014–18), led a church plant to Huntingdon which later left the CoE
- Tom Hutchings (2017–21), later chaplain at Kingham Hill School
- Robbie Strachan (2018–24), later vicar at St Peter in Eastgate, Lincoln
- John Percival (2022-)
- Ed Underhill (2024-)
