= Thomas Draxe =

English divine and author

Thomas Draxe (died 1618) was an English divine, a theological and classical author.

== Life ==
Draxe was born at Stoneleigh, near Coventry, Warwickshire. He received his education at Christ's College, Cambridge, as a member of which he afterwards proceeded B.D.

In 1601 he was presented to the vicarage of Dovercourt-cum-Harwich, Essex; but he left a curate in charge, and lived at Coventry and at Colwich in Staffordshire. A few years before his death he returned to Harwich. He was buried there on 29 January 1618.

== Works ==
Draxe was author of:

- 'The Churches Securitie; together with the Antidote or Preservative of everwaking Faith . . . Hereunto is annexed a ... Treatise of the Generall Signes ... of the Last Judgement,' London, 1608.
- 'The Worldes Resurrection, or the general calling of the Jewes. A familiar Commentary upon the eleventh Chapter of Saint Paul to the Romaines,' London, 1608 (with new title-page, London, 1609).
- The Sicke Man's Catechisme; or Path-way to Felicitie collected and contrived into questions and answers, out of the best Divines of our time. Whereunto is annexed two prayers,' (London), 1609.
- 'Calliepeia; or a rich Store-house of Proper, Choice and Elegant Latine Words and Phrases, collected for the most part out of all Tullies works,' London, 1612 (second impression, enlarged, London, 1613; another edition, London, 1643).
- 'Novi Coeli et nova Terra, seu Concio vere Theologica, ... in qua creaturarum vanitas et misera servitus, earundem restitutio, . . . et . . . corporis humani resurrectio, in eadem substantia … describuntur et demonstrantur,' Oppenheim, 1614.
- 'Bibliotheca scholastica instructissima. Or, Treasurie of Ancient Adagies and Sententious Proverbes, selected out of the English, Greeke, Latine, French, Italian, and Spanish, London, 1633, posthumous publication, the preface of which is dated from Harwich, 30 July 1615 (another edition, London, 1654).

Thomas Fuller states that Draxe translated the works of William Perkins into Latin, for the Geneva edition, 2 vols. fol., 1611-18.
