= Barnacle, Warwickshire =

Hamlet in Warwickshire, England

Coordinates: 52.458548°N 1.432394°W

Barnacle
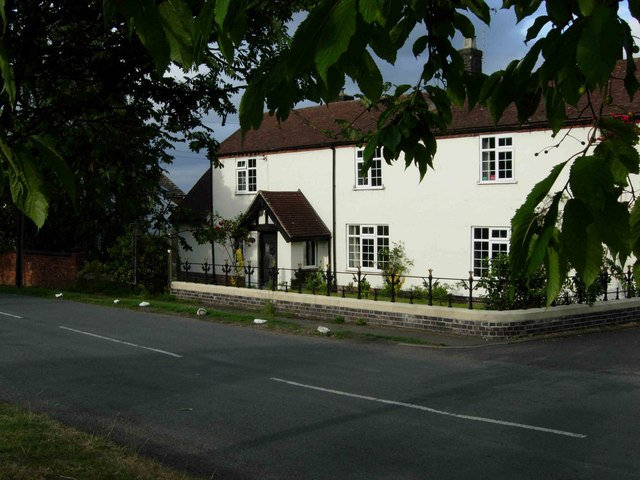
- A cottage in Barnacle

- Location within Warwickshire
- Civil parish: Shilton and Barnacle
- District: Rugby
- Shire county: Warwickshire
- Region: West Midlands
- Country: England
- Sovereign state: United Kingdom
- Post town: COVENTRY
- Postcode district: CV7
- Dialling code: 024
- Police: Warwickshire
- Fire: Warwickshire
- Ambulance: West Midlands
- UK Parliament: Rugby

Barnacle is a hamlet in the county of Warwickshire, England, in the civil parish of Shilton and Barnacle. Historically it was divided between the parishes of Shilton and Bulkington.

Barnacle was recorded in the Domesday Book as Bernhangre. The Knights Hospitallers held an estate in Barnacle in the 13th century. The hamlet contains Barnacle Hall which dates from 1745, it was built on the site of an earlier hall which had been owned by William Hickman, who was a captain in the Cavalier army of King Charles I during the English Civil War. Because of this it was plundered and burnt down by the Roundheads.

The hamlet contains some 18th century cottages, and the "Red Lion Inn". It also contains a small Methodist chapel, dating from 1844.
