= Thomas Taylor (priest, 1576–1632) =

English cleric

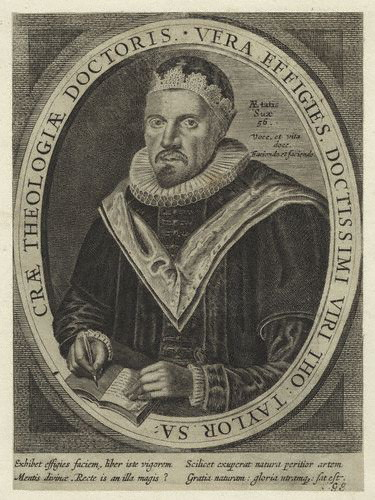
Thomas Taylor, engraving after William Marshall, some time after 1633.

Thomas Taylor (1576–1632) was an English cleric. A Calvinist, he held strong anti-Catholic views, and his career in the church had a long hiatus. He also attacked separatists, and wrote copiously, with the help of sympathetic patrons. He created a group of like-minded followers.

== Life ==
Taylor was born in 1576 in Richmond, Yorkshire, where his father was known as a friend to Puritans and silenced ministers. He distinguished himself at Cambridge, became a fellow and reader in Hebrew at Christ's College.

A follower of William Perkins, Taylor began preaching at 21 and when only about 25 preached a sermon at St. Paul's Cross before Queen Elizabeth. He was known for strong anti-Roman Catholic views.

In a sermon delivered at St. Mary's, Cambridge, in 1608, Taylor denounced Archbishop Richard Bancroft's severe attitude towards Puritans. He was then silenced by Samuel Harsnet and threatened with degradation. There began a period of 17 years, in which Taylor apparently had no benefice. He had patrons, and is known to have been chaplain to Edward Conway. He was living at Watford in 1612, and later moved to Reading where his brother, Theophilus Taylor, was incumbent of St Lawrence Church from 1618 to 1640. Here young preachers gathered round him, among them being William Jemmat, who later edited his works.

On 22 January 1625, Taylor was chosen as the incumbent of St Mary Aldermanbury, London. He continued there until about 1630 when, in poor health, he retired to Isleworth for the country air.

Taylor proceeded B.D. 1628. It was only with difficulty that Taylor obtained his degree of Doctor of Divinity at Cambridge, in 1630, in the teeth of opposition from Matthew Wren. He was incorporated at Oxford, died at Isleworth in 1632 of pleurisy. He was buried at St Mary Aldermanbury, Jemmat preaching his funeral sermon. The stenographer Theophilus Metcalfe was his nephew.

== Works ==
Taylor was a prolific writer. Apart from printed sermons, he was author of:

- Exposition upon Jude by William Perkins (1606, editor), dedicated to William Russell, 1st Baron Russell of Thornhaugh
- Beauties of Bethel, London, 1609.
- Japhet's First Pvblique Perswasion into Sem's Tents, Cambridge, 1612.
- Davids Learning, 1617, dedicated to William Knollys, 1st Viscount Wallingford
- Christ's Combat, 1618, dedicated to Sir Francis Knollys
- A threefold Alphabet of Christian Practice, 1618; republished 1688.
- A Commentarie vpon the Epistle of St. Paul to Titus, Cambridge, 1619
- A Mappe of Rome, five sermons preached on the Gunpowder Plot, London, 1620. Translated into French by Jean Jaquemot, as La Mappe Romaine, Geneva, 1623, and republished with the third edition of the next work. The work opposed the Spanish Match.
- The Parable of the Sower and of the Seed, London, 1621; 2nd edit., with engraved frontispiece, 1623; 3rd edit., (with A Mappe of Rome), 1634; translated into Dutch by Josua Sand, Merck Teeckenen van een goet ende eerlick heerte; 2nd edit., Rotterdam, 1658.
- Two Sermons, 1624, addressed to Members of the 4th Parliament of King James I, a strong anti-Catholic work.
- A Man in Christ, 2nd edit., London, 1629, with which is Meditations from the Creatures, 4th edit. 1635.
- The Practice of Repentance, laid downe in sundry directions, together with the Helpes, Lets, Signes and Motives, 2nd edit. 1629; 4th 1635.
- Regula Vitae: The Rvle of the Law under the Gospel, London, 1631; reprinted 1635. A work against antinomianism, it was answered by Robert Towne in The Assertion of Grace, 1644.
- The Progresse of Saints to Fvll Holinesse, London, 1630; another edit. 1631. Dedicated to Sir Robert Harley.
- Circumspect Walking, London, 1631, 12mo; reprinted London, 1658.
- Christ's Victorie over the Dragon, or Satan's Downfall, London.
- Three treatises: The Pearle of the Gospell, The Pilgrim's Profession, and A Glasse for Gentlewomen, London, 1633.
- The Principles of Christian Practice, 1635.
- Christ Revealed, 1635, 4to; reprinted at the Lady Huntingdon seminary at Trevecca, Wales, 1766, at Glasgow 1816, and translated into Welsh, Merthyr Tydvil, 1811.
- Moses and Aaron, or the Types and Shadows . . . explained, 1653, with an introduction by William Jemmat, in which he calls Taylor "The illuminate doctor", a phrase copied by Thomas Fuller and Anthony Wood.

Collected editions of Taylor's works, none of them quite complete, were published:

1. With a preface by Edmund Calamy and address by Joseph Caryl, London, 1653;
2. With a life of the author and portrait at age 56, engraved by Thomas Cross, London 1658;
3. The Works of the Judicious and Learned Thomas Taylor, London, 1659.
