= Marston Jabbett =

Hamlet in Warwickshire, England

Coordinates: 52°29′32.86″N 1°26′48.81″W

- Location within Warwickshire
- District: Nuneaton and Bedworth
- Shire county: Warwickshire
- Region: West Midlands
- Country: England
- Sovereign state: United Kingdom

Marston Jabbet is a hamlet near Bulkington, Warwickshire, England. In the Imperial Gazetteer of England and Wales of 1870-72 Marston Jabbett had a population of 93.

== Location ==
The hamlet is located about 1 mile northeast of Bulkington and 1.4 miles northeast of the city centre of Bedworth. Nuneaton is 2.4 miles to the north and Coventry is 7 miles to the south. The Ashby Canal passes through the northern part of the area.

== History ==
Marston Jabbet was recorded in the Domesday Book as Merstone, having 21 households with 12 villagers, 8 smallholders and 1 female slave. William Perkins, Puritan theologian and prolific religious author, was born in Marston Jabbet in 1558.
