= Charles Aloysius Ramsay =

Scottish-Prussian translator and writer

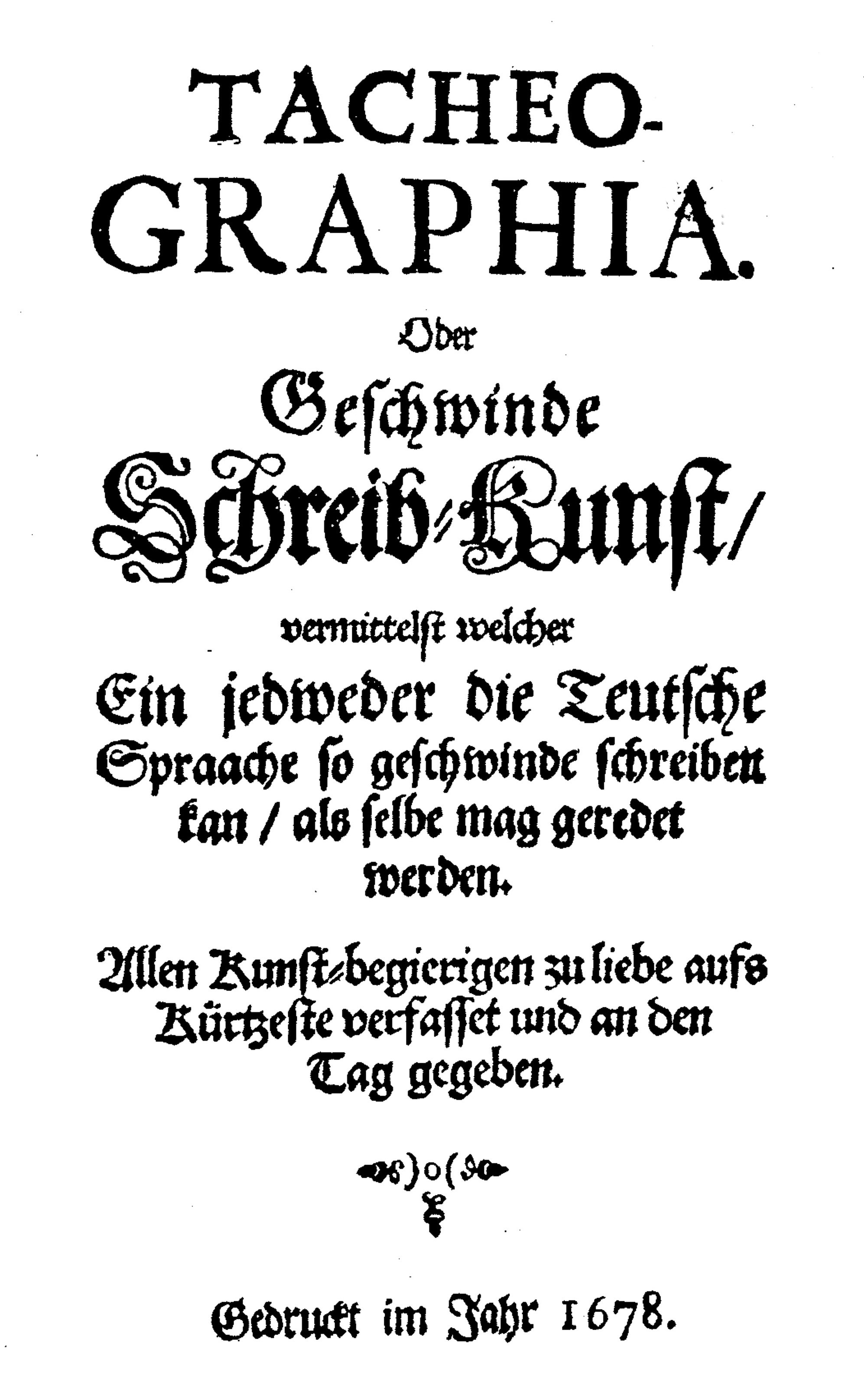
Tacheographia (title page) by Charles Aloysius Ramsay – 1678

Charles Aloysius Ramsay (fl.1677–1680) was a Scottish-Prussian writer on stenography and translator. He spent his time on the continent of Europe, and his shorthand system, which owed much to Thomas Shelton's, became popular in France during the 1680s.

== Life ==
He was probably, like his father, Charles (Carl) Ramsay (died 1669), born at Elbing in the Duchy of Prussia. He received a liberal education, and studied chemistry and medicine. He was living in Frankfurt in 1677 and in Paris in 1680.

== Works ==
Ramsay became known as the publisher and publicist of a system of shorthand, no earlier than 1678. In the 1650s there had been the shorthand of Jacques Cossard; in the 1660s that of Daniel Georg Morhof; and Thomas Shelton's system had become known in an exposition by Gaspard Schott. Tacheographia, oder, Geschwinde Schreib-Kunst (Frankfurt, 1678) is the first verifiable appearance of Ramsay's system. It certainly was adapted from that of Shelton, with minor changes, and Johann Christoph Mieth in 1679 accused Ramsay of plagiarism. In 1681 Latin and French editions followed.

Ramsay also translated from German into Latin a work of Johann Kunckel, Johannis Kunkelii, Elect. Sax. Cubicularii intimi et Chymici, Utiles Observationes sive Animadversiones de Salibus fixis et volatilibus, Auro et argento potabili, Spiritu mundi et similibus, London and Rotterdam, 1678; dedicated to the Royal Society of London.

== Notes ==
Attribution

This article incorporates text from a publication now in the public domain: Lee, Sidney, ed. (1896). "Ramsay, Charles Aloysius". Dictionary of National Biography. Vol. 47. London: Smith, Elder & Co.
