= William Perkins (theologian) =

English cleric and theologian (1558–1602)

The Reverend William Perkins
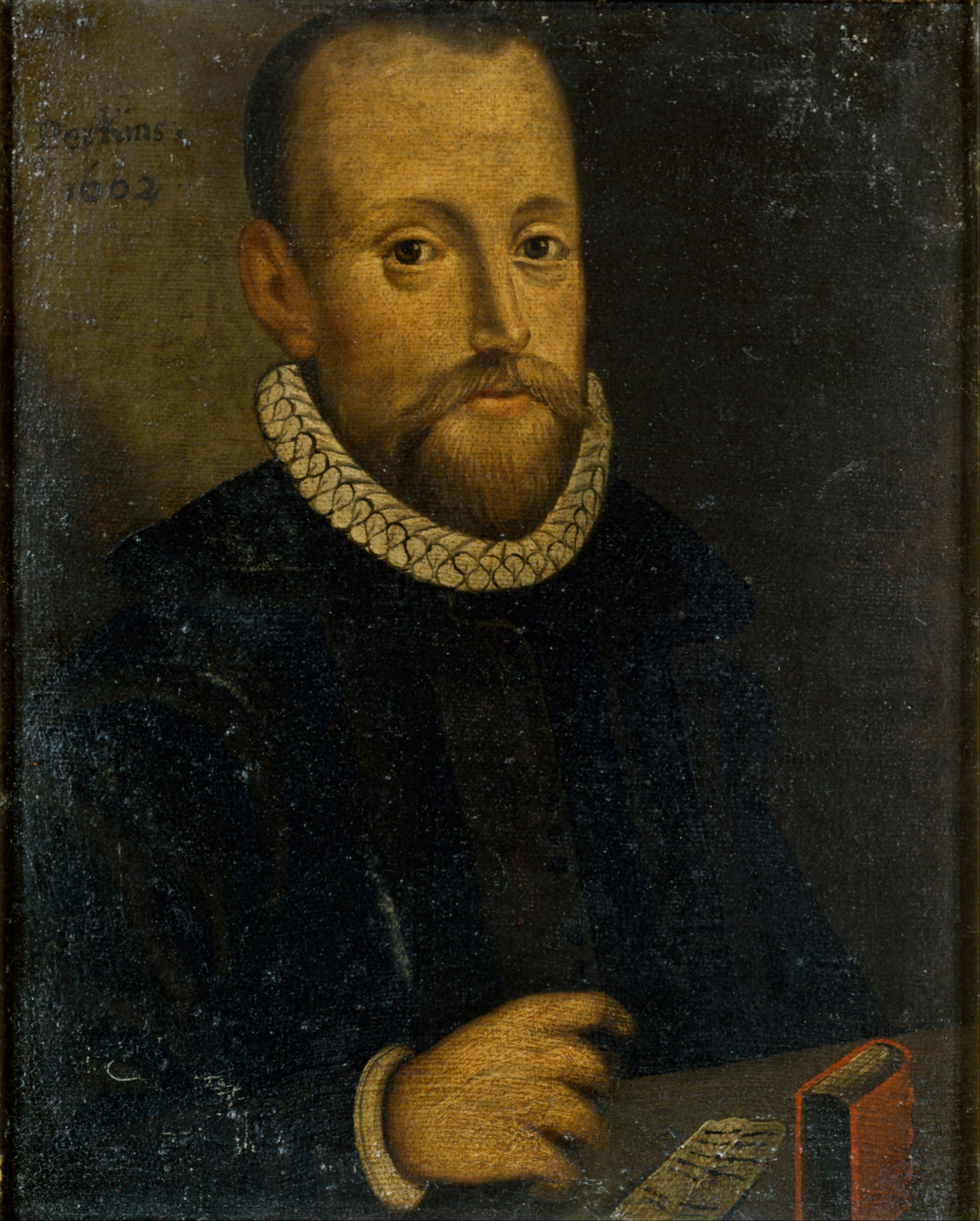
- Painting by an unknown artist inscribed 1602
- Born: 1558; Marston Jabbet, Warwickshire
- Died: 1602 (aged 43–44)
- Education: Christ's College, Cambridge
- Occupations: Clergyman, Theologian
- Notable work: The Arte of Prophesying
- Spouse: Timothye Cradocke
- Theological work
- Era: Elizabethan era
- Tradition or movement: Puritanism, Calvinism
- Notable ideas: Law and Gospel

William Perkins (1558–1602) was an influential English cleric and Cambridge theologian, receiving a B.A. and M.A. from the university in 1581 and 1584 respectively, and also one of the foremost leaders of the Puritan movement in the Church of England during the Elizabethan era. Although not entirely accepting of the Church of England's ecclesiastical practices, Perkins conformed to many of the policies and procedures imposed by the Elizabethan Settlement. He did remain, however, sympathetic to the non-conformist puritans and even faced disciplinary action for his support.

Perkins was a prolific author who penned over forty works, many of which were published posthumously. In addition to writing, he also served as a fellow at Christ's College and as a lecturer at St. Andrew's Church in Cambridge. He was a firm proponent of Reformed theology, particularly the supralapsarian theology of Theodore Beza. In addition, he was a staunch defender of Protestant ideals, specifically the five solae with a particular emphasis on solus Christus and sola Scriptura.

== Early life ==
Perkins was born to Thomas and Anna Perkins at Marston Jabbett in the parish of Bulkington, Warwickshire, England in 1558, the year in which the Protestant Elizabeth I succeeded her Catholic sister Mary I as Queen of England. Perkins lived his entire life under Elizabeth I, dying one year before the Queen's death in 1603. Perkins's relationship with Elizabeth was ambiguous: on the one hand, she was Good Queen Bess, the monarch under whom England finally and firmly became a Protestant nation; on the other hand, Perkins and the other members of the Puritan movement were frustrated that the Elizabethan settlement had not gone far enough and pushed for further Reformation.

Little is known of Perkins' childhood and upbringing. Sometime in his early life he was rendered lame which forced him to write with his left hand. His family was evidently of some means, since in June 1577, at age 19, Perkins was enrolled as a pensioner of Christ's College, Cambridge being trained in the tradition of the Reformed scholastic framework. He would receive his BA in 1581 and his MA in 1584.

According to an unverifiable story, Perkins was convinced of the error of his ways after he heard a Cambridge mother say to her child, "Hold your tongue, or I will give you to drunken Perkins yonder." Whether or not the story is true, it is clear that Perkins had a religious awakening sometime between 1581 and 1584 during his time at Cambridge. Thomas Fuller's biographical profile of Perkins portrayed him as "very wild in his youth," skilled in mathematics, possessed of "a rare felicity in speedy reading of books," and preaching, early in his ministry, with a sternness that he mitigated in later years:

He would pronounce the word damn with such an emphasis, as left a doleful echo in his auditors' ears a good while after... . But in his older age he altered his voice and remitted much of his former rigidness; often professing that to preach mercy was that proper office of the ministers of the Gospel.

Perkins's sermons, wrote Fuller, "were not so plain but that the piously learned did admire them, nor so learned but that the plain did understand them."

Perkins thus began a lifelong association with the "moderate-puritan" wing of the Church of England which held views similar to those of the continental Calvinist theologians Theodore Beza, Girolamo Zanchi, and Zacharias Ursinus. Perkins's circle at Cambridge included Laurence Chaderton and Richard Greenham.

== Perkins as clergyman and Cambridge fellow ==
Following his ordination, Perkins also preached his first sermons to the prisoners of the Cambridge jail. On one celebrated occasion, Perkins encountered a young man who was going to be executed for his crimes and who feared he was shortly going to be in hell: Perkins convinced the man that, through Christ, God could forgive his sins, and the formerly distraught youth faced his execution with manly composure as a result.

In 1584, after receiving his MA degree, Perkins was elected as a fellow of Christ's College, a post he held until 1594. In 1585, he became a Lecturer of St Andrew the Great in Cambridge, a post he held until his death.

== Perkins's churchmanship ==
As a "moderate Puritan", Perkins was firmly opposed to non-conformists and other separatists who refused to conform to the Church of England. He also opposed the Elizabethan regime's program of imposing uniformity on the church. For example, when Archbishop of Canterbury John Whitgift imprisoned Francis Johnson for Johnson's support of a presbyterian form of church polity, Perkins defended Johnson. This was not an isolated incident, and he appeared before the commission more than once.

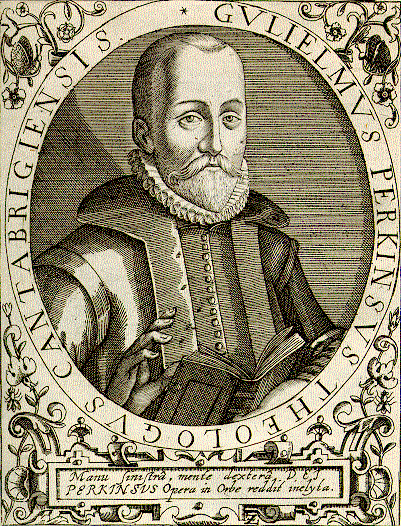

On 13 January 1587, Perkins preached a sermon denouncing the practice of kneeling to receive Communion, and was ultimately called before the Vice-Chancellor as a result. During the final set of trials against Puritan ministers in 1590–1591, Perkins confirmed that he had discussed the Book of Discipline with Puritan ministers, but claimed that he could not remember whom he had talked to.

William Perkins married Timothye Cradocke of Grantchester on 2 July 1595. Prior to the marriage, he had resigned his fellowship at Christ's College, since fellowships were restricted to unmarried men.

The couple had seven children together. Three died young from various causes, and one child was born after Perkins’s death.

== Theological opinions ==
Perkins was a proponent of "double predestination" and was a major player in introducing the thought of Theodore Beza to England. He viewed the Reformed concept of the Covenant of Grace, which is central to Reformed soteriology and double predestination, to be a doctrine of great consoling value. He was responsible for the publication in English of Beza's famous chart about double predestination. Writing less than a century after Perkins's death, his biographer Thomas Fuller recounted an objection that Perkins's views on double predestination often prompted:

Some object that his doctrine, referring all to an absolute decree, hamstrings all industry, and cuts off the sinews of men's endeavours towards salvation. For, ascribing all to the wind of God's Spirit, (which bloweth where it listeth,) he leaveth nothing to the oars of man's diligence, either to help or hinder to the attaining of happiness, but rather opens a wide door to licentious security.

In addition to adopting a Reformed soteriology, Perkins also strongly held to the doctrines of solo Christo and sola Scriptura which "serve as the twin foundation stones for what Perkins conceived as biblical preaching." He was also a major proponent of literal interpretation using the regula fidei, or Rule of Faith. This principle advocates that the unclear portions of scripture ought to be interpreted by the clear portions rather than by tradition or speculation. He did, however, leave room for figurative or analogical language when context demands.

== Influence ==
Although relatively unknown to modern Christians, Perkins has had an influence that is felt by Christians all around the world. and was highly regarded in the Elizabethan Church. In addition, Perkins's views on double predestination made him a major target of Jacobus Arminius, the Dutch Reformed clergyman who opposed the doctrine of predestination. He also was influential in the theological development of the American puritan philosopher and theologian Jonathan Edwards. In addition, some consider the hermeneutics of Perkins to be a model that ought to be emulated.

In his lifetime, Perkins attained enormous popularity, with sales of his works eventually surpassing even Calvin's. When he died, his writings were selling more copies than those of many of the most famous of the Reformers combined.

From his position at Cambridge, Perkins was able to influence a whole generation of English churchmen. His pupils include:

- William Ames, Puritan theologian whose "Marrow of Theology" was the most popular systematic theology of the time became professor of theology at Franeker, Netherlands
- John Robinson, the founder of congregationalism in Leiden and pastor of the group which went on to found the Plymouth Colony
- Thomas Goodwin, Congregationalist minister and Puritan theologian who was a vital part of the Westminster Assembly
- Paul Baynes, Puritan preacher and successor to Perkins as lecturer at the church of St Andrew the Great in Cambridge
- Samuel Ward, Puritan preacher and master of Sidney Sussex College, Cambridge
- Phineas Fletcher, a poet
- Thomas Draxe, English puritan and theologian
- Thomas Taylor, Puritan preacher and Doctor of Divinity at Cambridge
- James Ussher, Archbishop of Armagh
- James Montagu, master of Sidney Sussex and later bishop of Winchester
- Richard Sibbes, Puritan preacher of Gray's Inn and Master at Catherine's Hall known for his eloquence and comforting sermons
- John Cotton, Colonial American Puritan minister and theologian of the Massachusetts Bay Colony
- Thomas Hooker, Colonial American Puritan minister and founder of the Connecticut Colony
- Thomas Shepard, Colonial American Puritan minister and theologian known for his leadership in the Antinomian Controversy

== Death ==
In 1602, Perkins suffered from "the stone". After several weeks of suffering, he died on 22 October 1602 at age 44.

James Montagu preached his funeral sermon, taking as his text Joshua 1.2, ‘Moses my servant is dead’. He was buried in St. Andrew's, the church which he had pastored for eighteen years.

== Publications by Perkins ==
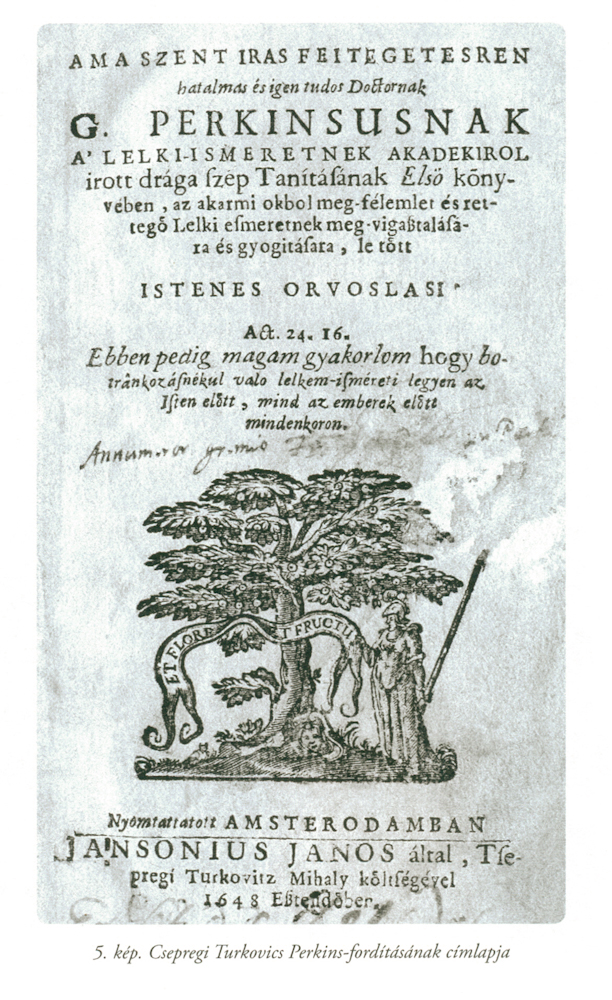
A Hungarian translation of a work by Perkins, 1648

- Defensio pro Alexandro Discono (1584)
- A Warning against the Idolatrie of the Last Times (1584)
- Foure Great Lyers, Striuing Who Shall Win the Siluer Whetstone: Also, A Resolution to the Count (1585)
- A Treatise Tending Vnto a Declaration Whether a Man be in the Estate of Damnation or in the Estate of Grace: And If he be in the First, How he may in Time Come out of it: if in the second, how he maie discerne it, and perseuere in the same to the end. The points that are handled are set downe in the page following (1590)
- Armilla aurea, id est, Miranda series causarum et salutis & damnationis iuxta verbum Dei: Eius synopsin continet annexa tabula (1590)
- A golden chaine, or the description of theologie: containing the order of the causes of saluation and damnation, according to Gods woord. A view of the order wherof, is to be seene in the table annexed (1591)
- The foundation of Christian religion: gathered into sixe principles. And it is to bee learned of ignorant people, that they may be fit to hear sermons with profit, and to receiue the Lords Supper with comfort (1591)
- Prophetica, sive, De sacra et vnica ratione concionandi tractatus (1592)
- A case of conscience : the greatest that euer was; how a man may know whether he be the child of God or no. Resolued by the word of God. Whereunto is added a briefe discourse, taken out of Hier. Zanchius (1592)
- An exposition of the Lords prayer: in the way of catechising seruing for ignorant people (1592)
- Tvvo treatises: I. Of the nature and practise of repentance. II. Of the combat of the flesh and spirit (1593)
- An exposition of the Lords praier: in the way of catechisme (1593)
- A direction for the government of the tongue according to Gods word (1593)
- An exposition of the Symbole or Creed of the Apostles: according to the tenour of the Scriptures, and the consent of orthodoxe Fathers of the Church (1595)
- A salve for a sicke man, or, A treatise containing the nature, differences, and kindes of death: as also the right manner of dying well. And it may serue for spirituall instruction to 1. Mariners when they goe to sea. 2. Souldiers when they goe to battell. 3. Women when they trauell of child (1595)
- A declaration of the true manner of knowing Christ crucified (1596)
- A reformed Catholike, or, A declaration shewing how neere we may come to the present Church of Rome in sundrie points of religion, and wherein we must for euer depart from them: with an advertisement to all fauourers of the Romane religion, shewing that the said religion is against the Catholike principles and grounds of the catechisme (1597)
- De praedestinationis modo et ordine : et de amplitudine gratiae diuinae Christiana & perspicua disceptatio (1598)
- Specimen digesti, sive Harmoniæ bibliorum Veteris et Novi Testamneti (1598)
- A warning against the idolatrie of the last times: And an instruction touching religious, or diuine worship (1601)
- The true gaine : more in worth then all the goods in the world (1601)
- How to liue, and that well: in all estates and times, specially when helps and comforts faile (1601)

Posthumously:

- The works of that famous and worthie minister of Christ, in the Universitie of Cambridge, M.W. Perkins : gathered into one volume, and newly corrected according to his owne copies. With distinct chapters, and contents of euery book, and a generall table of the whole (1603)
- The reformation of couetousnesse: Written vpon the 6. chapter of Mathew, from the 19. verse to the ende of the said chapter (1603)
- A commentarie or exposition, vpon the fiue first chapters of the Epistle to the Galatians: penned by the godly, learned, and iudiciall diuine (1604)
- Lectures vpon the three first chapters of the Reuelation: preached in Cambridge anno Dom. 1595 (1604)
- Gvilielmi Perkinsi Problema de Romanæ fidei ementito Catholicismo.: Estq[ue] Antidotum contra Thesaurum Catholicum Iodoci Coccij. Et [propaideia] iuventutis in lectione omnium patrum (1604)
- The first part of The cases of conscience: Wherein specially, three maine questions concerning man, simply considered in himselfe, are propounded and resolued, according to the word of God (1604)
- Satans sophistrie ansuuered by our Sauiour Christ: and in diuers sermons further manifested (1604)
- Hepieíkeia: or, a treatise of Christian equitie and moderation (1604)
- M. Perkins, his Exhortation to repentance, out of Zephaniah: preached in 2. sermons in Sturbridge Faire. Together with two treatises of the duties and dignitie of the ministrie: deliuered publiquely in the Vniuersitie of Cambridge. With a preface præfixed touching the publishing of all such workes of his as are to be expected: with a catalogue of all the perticulers [sic] of them, diligently perused and published, by a preacher of the word (1605)
- Works newly corrected according to his owne copies (1605)
- Of the calling of the ministerie two treatises, describing the duties and dignities of that calling (1605)
- The combat betweene Christ and the diuell displayed, or A commentarie upon the temptations of Christ (1606)
- A godlie and learned exposition vpon the whole epistle of Ivde... (1606)
- A C[hristian] and [plain]e treatise of the manner and order of predestination: and of the largenes of Gods grace (1606)
- The arte of prophecying, or, A treatise concerning the sacred and onely true manner and methode of preaching (1607)
- A cloud of faithfull witnesses, leading to the heauenly Canaan, or, A commentarie vpon the 11 chapter to the Hebrewes (1607)
- A treatise of mans imaginations: Shewing his naturall euill thoughts: His want of good thoughts: The way to reforme them (1607)
- A discourse of the damned art of witchcraft: so farre forth as it is revealed in the Scriptures and manifest by true experience ... (1608)
- The vvhole treatise of the cases of conscience: distinguished into three bookes (1608)
- Christian oeconomie: or, A short survey of the right manner of erecting and ordering a familie: according to the scriptures (1609)
- A graine of musterd-seede: or, the least measure of grace that is or can be effectuall to saluation (1611)
- A resolution to the countryman prooving it utterly unlawfull to buy or use our yeerely prognostications (1618)
- Deaths knell: or, The sicke mans passing-bell: summoning all sicke consciences to pr[e]pare themselues for the coming of the grea[t] day of doome, lest mercies gate be shut against them: fit for all those that desire to arriue at the heauenly Ierusalem. Whereunto are added prayers fit for housholders. The ninth edition. (1628)

Recent reprints:

- The Work of William Perkins, ed. Ian Breward (1970)
- The Works of William Perkins, ed. Joel R. Beeke and Derek W. H. Thomas, 10 vols. (Grand Rapids, Michigan: Reformation Heritage Books, 2014–2020).
