= Shilton and Barnacle =

Civil parish in Warwickshire, England

Coordinates: 52.4564°N 1.4170°W

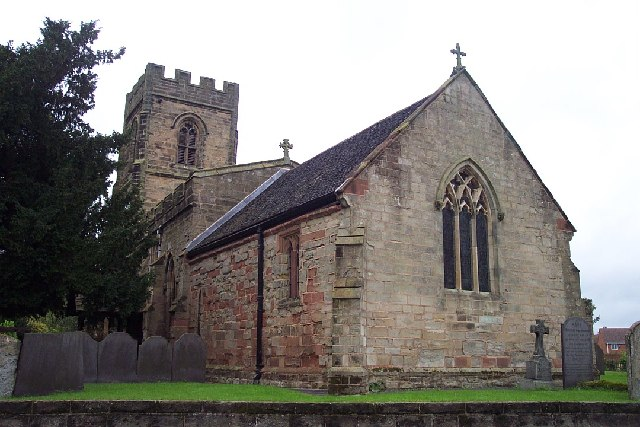
- St Andrew's Church, Shilton

- Location within Warwickshire
- Population: 875 (2011 census)
- Civil parish: Shilton and Barnacle
- District: Rugby
- Shire county: Warwickshire
- Region: West Midlands
- Country: England
- Sovereign state: United Kingdom
- Police: Warwickshire
- Fire: Warwickshire
- Ambulance: West Midlands

Shilton and Barnacle is a civil parish in the Borough of Rugby in Warwickshire, England. It consists of the village of Shilton, and the nearby hamlet of Barnacle. In the 2001 census it had a population of 826, increasing to 875 at the 2011 Census, and then reducing to 817 at the 2021 Census.

The civil parish was renamed from Shilton to Shilton and Barnacle on 1 December 2012.
