= Theophilus Metcalfe =

English stenographer

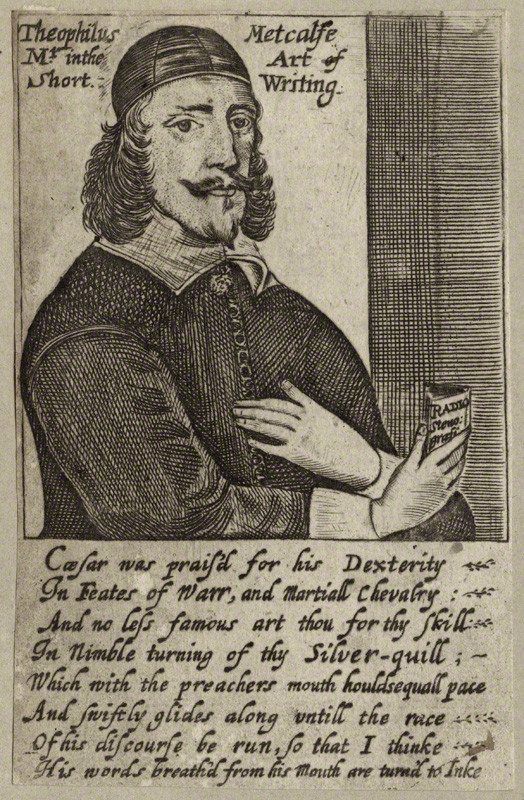
Theophilus Metcalfe

Theophilus Metcalfe (bap. 3 June 1610 – c.1645) was an English stenographer. He invented a shorthand system that became popular, in particular, in New England, where it was used to record the Salem witch trials.

== Life ==
Metcalfe was baptised on 3 June 1610 in Richmond, Yorkshire, and was the tenth child of Matthew Metcalfe and his wife Maria Taylor; Thomas Taylor (1576–1632) was his mother's brother.

A professional writer and teacher of shorthand, Metcalfe in 1645 resided in the London parish of St Katharine's by the Tower. He died that year or early in 1646, when his widow assigned rights to reissue the book of his system.

== Works ==
Metcalfe published a stenographic system very much along the lines of Thomas Shelton's Tachygraphy. The first edition of his work was entitled Radio-Stenography, or Short Writing and is supposed to have been published in 1635. A so-called sixth edition appeared at London in 1645. It was followed in 1649 by A Schoolmaster to Radio-Stenography, explaining all the Rules of the said Art, by way of Dialogue betwixt Master and Scholler, fitted to the weakest capacities that are desirous to learne this Art. Many editions of the system appeared under the title of Short Writing: the most easie, exact, lineall, and speedy Method that hath ever yet been obtained or taught by any in this Kingdome.

A copy of the Bible written in Metcalfe's system by William Holder, and completed in 1668, is in the British Library. Isaac Watts also adopted it.

The numbering of later editions, from the 19th of 1679 reflects no more than different printings taken from the same plates, engraved by Frederick Henry Van Hove of Haarlem. A final edition, called 55th, appeared in 1721.

== Notes ==
Attribution

This article incorporates text from a publication now in the public domain: Lee, Sidney, ed. (1894). "Metcalfe, Theophilus". Dictionary of National Biography. Vol. 37. London: Smith, Elder & Co.
