= Elisha Coles (lexicographer) =

English lexicographer and stenographer

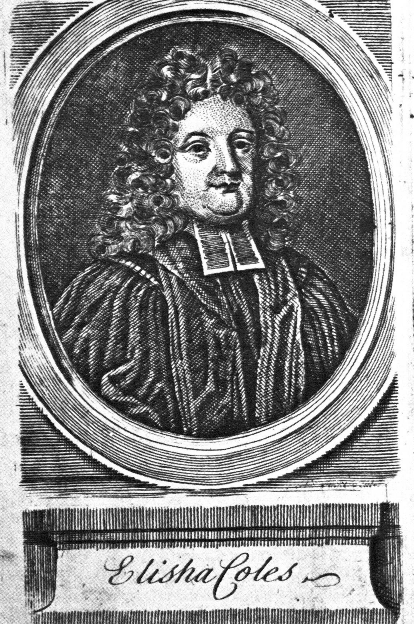
Engraved portrait of Elisha Coles taken from a rare copy of his 1674 treatise on shorthand held by the British Museum

Elisha Coles (c. 1640 – 1680) was a 17th-century English lexicographer and stenographer.

== Life ==
He was son of John Coles, schoolmaster of Wolverhampton, and nephew of Elisha Coles the religious author. He became chorister of Magdalen College, Oxford, 1658–61; teacher of Latin and English in London, 1663; usher of Merchant Taylors' School, 1677; first headmaster of Erasmus Smith's school in Galway, 1678.

He published devotional verses, 1671, a treatise on shorthand, 1674, primers of English and Latin, 1674-5, an English dictionary, 1676, and a Latin dictionary, 1677. The shorthand used by Thomas Bayes has been identified as that of Thomas Shelton, as modified by Coles.

His 1676 Dictionary contains

"many words and phrases that belong to our English Dialects in our several Counties, and where the particular Shire is not exprest, the distinction (according to the use) is more general into North and South-Country words."

Coles' dialectal entries are mostly collected from the glossary by John Ray with some additions from the Dictionarium Rusticum in John Worlidge's 1669 Systema Agriculturae.

== Works ==
- Christologia, Or, A Metrical Paraphrase on the History of Our Lord (1671) was perhaps by this Elisha Coles, or the son of the same name of his uncle Elisha.
- The Compleat English Schoolmaster (1674)
- Nolens Volens, Or, You Shall Make Latin Whether You Will Or No
- A Dictionary, English-Latin and Latin English
- An English Dictionary: Explaining the Difficult Terms that are used in Divinity, Husbandry, Physick, Phylosophy, Law, Navigation, Mathematicks, and Other Arts and Sciences (1676)
- Syncrisis, Or, The Most Natural and Easie Method of Learning Latin (1677)
- Of Perseverance
