= Thomas Arkisden =

Thomas Arkisden (fl. 1633), was a stenographer, who invented a shorthand alphabet, whilst at Emmanuel College, Cambridge. He settled in Aspley Guise, where he was known as the Bletchley minster.

== Life ==
Arkisden was born around 1608 to Thomas Arkisden and his wife Francis Durrant. his name as alternately spelled Archisden, Archensden, and Arkasdon The senior Arkisden had been a land owner, but died before Arkisden and his brother came of age, leaving the pair under the guardianship of Henry Sande, a minister. There he became friends with the Winthrop family, including John Winthrop the Younger. When Sande died John Winthrop took responsibility for him. Arkisden was educated at Emmanuel College, Cambridge (B.A. 1629–30; M.A. 1633). Arkisden married Alice Sparker, one of ten children of Reverend William Sparker, Rector of Bletchley in 1636 and went on to become a Presbyterian rector at Aspley Guise, Bedfordshire, under the patronage of Sir Oliver Luke and spent much time as the Bletchley minister. Arkisden would go on two have nine children, the eldest was named Alice after her mother and born in 1637, the second was William in 1641, carrying on until their youngest in 1675. Arkisden was buried in the same parish on 16 June 1682.

== Shorthand ==
While at the university he invented a shorthand alphabet, which has acquired a peculiar interest in consequence of its similarity to other early systems of stenography published somewhat later, especially to those of William Cartwright and his nephew, Jeremiah Rich, the latter of whom lays claim in his 'Art's Rarity' (1654) to absolute originality. The alphabet is given in the 'Collections of the Massachusetts Historical Society'.

== Attribution ==
This article incorporates text from a publication now in the public domain: Cooper, Thompson (1885). "Arkisden, Thomas". In Stephen, Leslie (ed.). Dictionary of National Biography. Vol. 2. London: Smith, Elder & Co.
