= Shilton, Warwickshire =

Village in Warwickshire, England

Coordinates: 52.45606°N 1.40542°W

Shilton
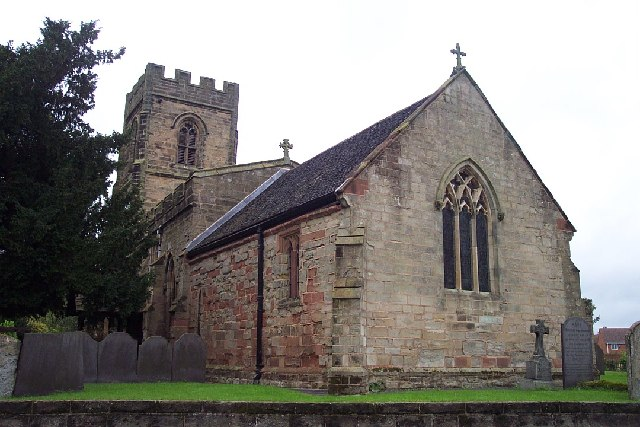
- St Andrew's Church

- Location within Warwickshire
- OS grid reference: SP405844
- Civil parish: Shilton and Barnacle
- District: Rugby
- Shire county: Warwickshire
- Region: West Midlands
- Country: England
- Sovereign state: United Kingdom
- Post town: COVENTRY
- Postcode district: CV7
- Dialling code: 024
- Police: Warwickshire
- Fire: Warwickshire
- Ambulance: West Midlands
- UK Parliament: Rugby

Shilton is a village in the civil parish of Shilton and Barnacle in the English county of Warwickshire. The village is about 5.5 miles (8.9 km) northeast of Coventry on the B4065 road and at a crossroads with the B4029 road, and is the same distance southwest of Hinckley. Administratively, Shilton is in an outlying part of the Borough of Rugby, although it is more than eight miles (13 km) northwest of the town of Rugby.

Shilton is almost cut in two by the Trent Valley railway line (part of the West Coast Main Line). The village formerly had its own railway station on this line which opened in 1847, and closed in 1957. A short distance to the northwest of the village is the M69 motorway.

The village contains a number of old cottages along the main street which were historically occupied by weavers, a village hall and one old pub, the "Shilton Arms", historically there was a second pub called the "Old Plough".

The village was mentioned in the Domesday Book of 1086 as “Scelftone”, and was recorded as having eight households. The parish church of St Andrew's has existed since the 13th century, but was rebuilt twice in the 14th and 15th centuries. A second north aisle was added in 1865, and was designed by Sir George Gilbert Scott. The graveyard has some elaborately carved 18th century gravestones. There is also a small baptist chapel in the village which dates from 1867.

Leicester Road is just past the Shilton arms. Leicester Road contains a farm which field lies next to the Shilton Arms garden. As you enter Leicester Road on the left hand side there is a white house which used to be a pub too but was converted into a house in 2002.
