= Martin Billingsley =

Martin Billingsley (1591–1622) was an English writing-master, a successor in giving advice on handwriting to Peter Bales.

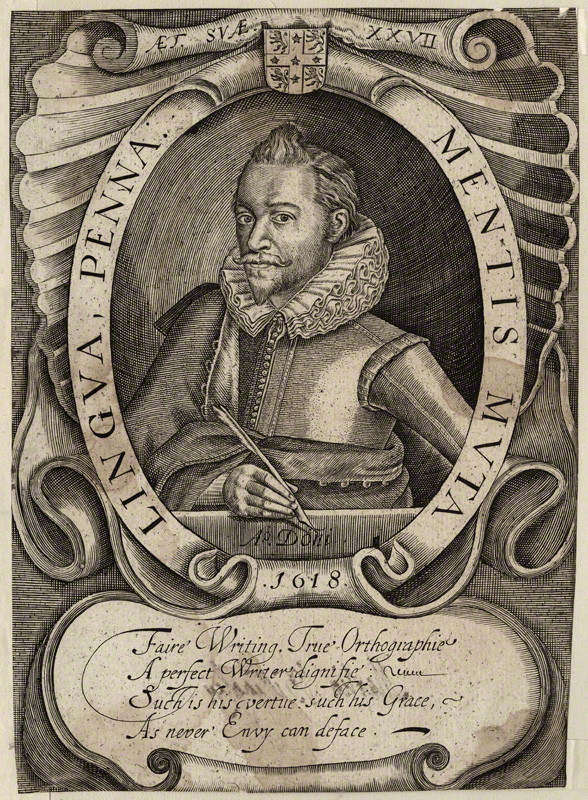
Martin Billingsley, 1618 engraving by William Hole

== Life and works ==
He was born in 1591, and was residing in London, in Bush Lane, near London Stone, in 1618, when he dedicated his first short work, The Pens Excellencie, or the Secretarys Delight, to Prince Charles. From its dedication he was Prince's writing master. In 1637, Billingsley's A Coppie Booke, containing Varieties of Examples of all the most curious Hands written, was published in its second edition. It refers to a previous work, The Pens Transcendency, and lists other works which may have been Billingsley's.

The number of hands set out by Billingsley in examples was six, with some additional subdivisions. The six were the Secretary, "the usuall hand of England"; the Bastard Secretary, or Text; the Roman; the Italian; the Court (used in the courts of King's Bench and Common Pleas); and the Chancery. The Roman hand, Billingsley said, was the hand "usually taught to women".
