= Paul Baynes =

English clergyman

Paul Baynes (also Bayne, Baines; c. 1573 – 1617) was an English clergyman. Described as a "radical Puritan", he was unpublished in his lifetime, but more than a dozen works were put out in the five years after he died. His commentary on Ephesians is his best known work; the commentary on the first chapter, itself of 400 pages, appeared in 1618.

== Life ==
He went to school at Wethersfield, Essex. A pupil and follower of William Perkins, he graduated from Christ's College, Cambridge with a B.A. in 1593/4, M.A. in 1597, and was elected a Fellow of Christ's College in 1600, a position he lost in 1608 for non-conformity. He was successor to Perkins as lecturer at the church of St Andrew the Great in Cambridge, opposite Christ's; they were considered the town's leading Puritan preachers. In 1617, Baynes described the types of servitude then existing in England, from apprentices to chattel slaves born enslaved.

== Influence ==
Baynes was an important influence on the following generation of English Calvinists, through William Ames, a convert of Perkins, and Richard Sibbes, a convert of Baynes himself. This makes Baynes a major link in a chain of "Puritan worthies": to John Cotton, John Preston, Thomas Shepard and Thomas Goodwin. Ames quoted Baynes: "Beware of a strong head and a cold heart", an idea that would be repeated by Cotton Mather, who was grandson to John Cotton.

== Works ==
- Commentary on Ephesians (1618)
- A Counterbane against Earthly Carefulnes (1619)
- The Diocesans Tryall (1621)
- Brief Directions unto a Godly Life (1637)
