= Ralph Austen =

English writer on husbandry

Ralph Austen (c. 1612–1676) was an English writer on gardening and husbandry, who urged the use of concise, plain language. He also worked to popularize cider as a beverage.

== Life ==
Austen was a native of Staffordshire. He spent the second part of his life in Oxford, devoting most of his time to gardening and the raising of fruit trees. In 1647 he became deputy-registrary to the Parliamentary visitation of Oxford University, and subsequently registrary in his own right. He also ran a successful nursery business, selling grafts and seedlings.

One of the Hartlib Circle, Austen was associated with Samuel Hartlib in a petition to Oliver Cromwell for improving orchards and forestry. He was interested in expanding onto confiscated lands at Shotover Forest. He worked to spread cider, then known only in the West Country, exchanging apple-tree grafts with John Beale.

According to Anthony Wood, Austen died at home in the parish of St Peter-le-Bailey, Oxford, and was buried in its church, in the aisle adjoining the south side of the chancel, on 26 October 1676. He had been a gardener and planting trees for half a century.

== Works ==
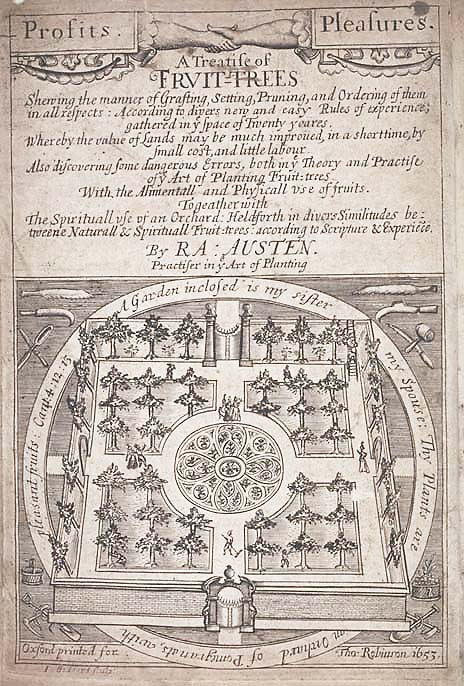
Frontispiece of A Treatise on Fruit-trees (1653) by Ralph Austen, engraving by John Goddard. The picture is emblematic, referring to the enclosed garden of the Song of Solomon, and so to the Church. At the same time, it shows gardening tools and a planting plan.

In 1653 Austen published A Treatise on Fruit-trees, showing the manner of grafting, setting, pruning, and ordering of them in all respects, and along with it a long pamphlet on the Spiritual Use of an Orchard. Austen made researches in the Bodleian Library, and wrote fuller accounts of pruning and grafting than had been in print. One encouragement to publish was the success of Walter Blith's The English Improver, or, A New Survey of Husbandry, which first appeared in 1649. Blith was another of the Calvinistic Hartlib Circle, whose members could see spiritual as well as practical significant in agriculture and horticulture. Austen took the meaning of grafting to be the possibility of return to before the Fall of Man, with the metaphor of wild grafts being returned to the stocks of the Garden.

A second edition of the Treatise with additions and improvements, appeared in 1657. Its dedication was to Robert Boyle, where the first edition was dedicated to Hartlib; and in it Austen argued for husbandry books that were concise and in plain language, a point taken up by John Worlidge. He also argued that fruit trees were books in which the attributes of God could be read. Wood stated that sales were hindered by the association of gardening with a purely theological treatise, but there were further editions in 1662 and 1667. The Spiritual Use of an Orchard was reprinted separately in 1847.

In 1658 Austen published Observations on some parts of Sir Francis Bacon's Naturall History as it concerns Fruit-trees, Fruits, and Flowers. Possibly through some misreading of the title-page, this work has been attributed by some to a Francis Austen, and there is apparently no foundation for the statement that it was published originally in 1631 and again in 1657. According to Wood, Austen was the author of A Dialogue or Familiar Discourse and Conference between the Husbandman and Fruiterer in his Nurseries, Orchards, and Gardens, published in 1676 and 1679, and containing much of the substance of his earlier treatise.
