= Peter Bales =

- Born: 1547; London, England
- Died: 1610 (aged 62–63)
- Occupation: Calligrapher

Peter Bales (1547–1610?) was an English calligrapher and one of the inventors of shorthand writing. He was born in London in 1547, and is described by Anthony Wood as a "most dexterous person in his profession, to the great wonder of scholars and others". We are also informed that "he spent several years in sciences among Oxonians, particularly, as it seems, in Gloucester Hall; but that study, which he used for a diversion only, proved at length an employment of profit." He is mentioned for his skill in micrography in Holinshed's Chronicle.

John Evelyn wrote:

Hadrian Junius, speaking as a miracle of somebody who wrote the Apostles' Creed and the beginning of St. John's Gospel within the compass of a farthing: what would he have said of our famous Peter Bales, who, in the year 1575, wrote the Lord's Prayer, the Creed, Decalogue, with two short prayers in Latin, his own name, motto, day of the month, year of the Lord, and reign of the queen, to whom he presented it at Hampton Court, all of it written within the circle of a single penny, inchased in a ring and borders of gold, and covered with a crystal, so accurately wrought as to be very plainly legible; to the great admiration of her majesty, the whole privy council, and several ambassadors then at court?

Bales was likewise very dexterous in imitating handwritings, and between 1576 and 1590 was employed by Secretary Walsingham in certain political manoeuvres. We find him at the head of a school near the Old Bailey, London, in 1590, in which year he published his Writing Schoolemaster, in three Parts. This book included an Arte of Brachygraphie, one of the earliest attempts to construct a system of shorthand. In 1595 he had a great trial of skill with one Daniel Johnson, for a golden pen valued at £20, and won it; and a contemporary author further relates that he had also the arms of calligraphy given him, which are azure, a pen or (blue with a gold pen). Bales died about the year 1610.
