= Gloucester Cathedral =

Church in Gloucester, England

- Cathedral Church of St Peter and the Holy and Indivisible Trinity
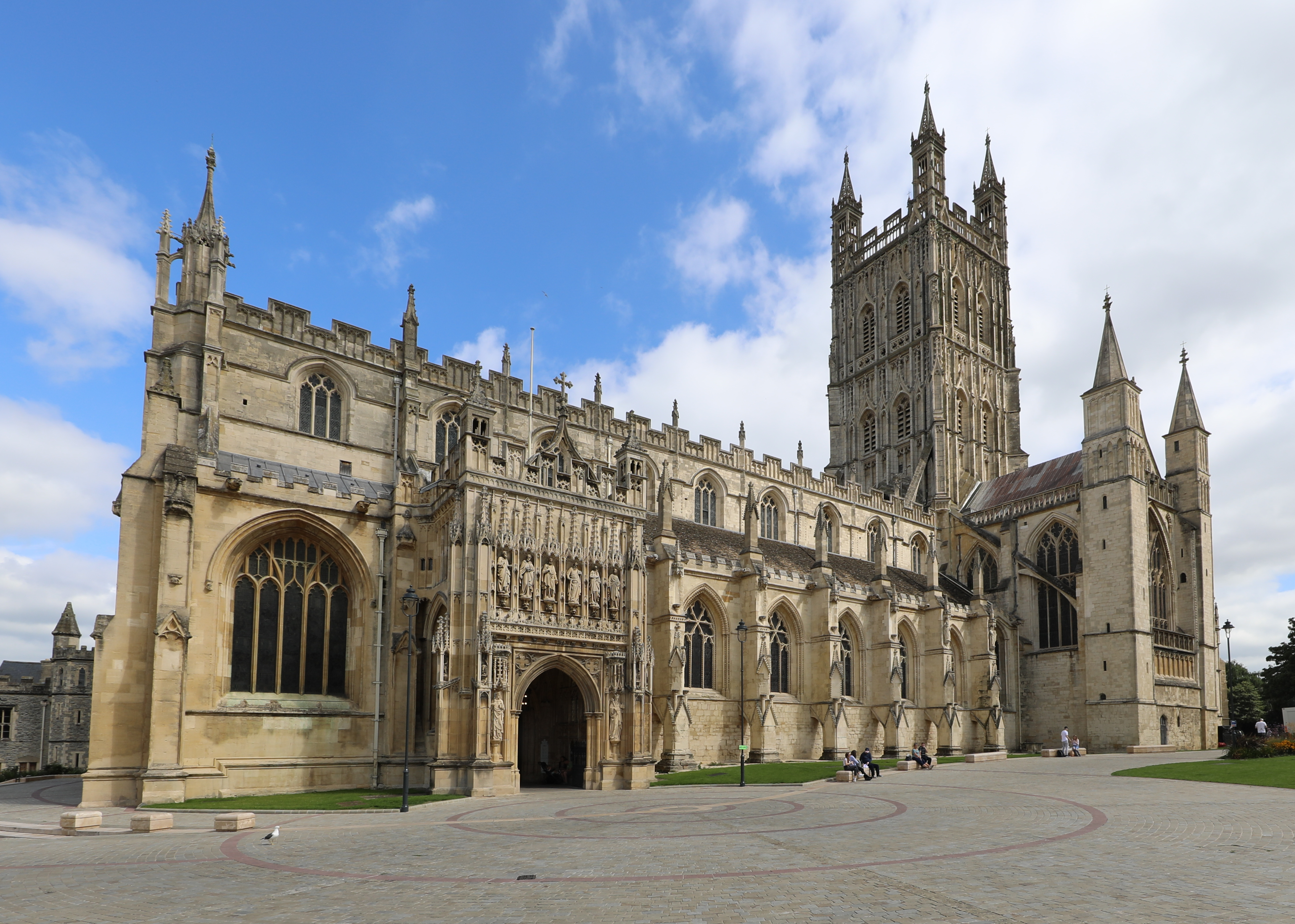

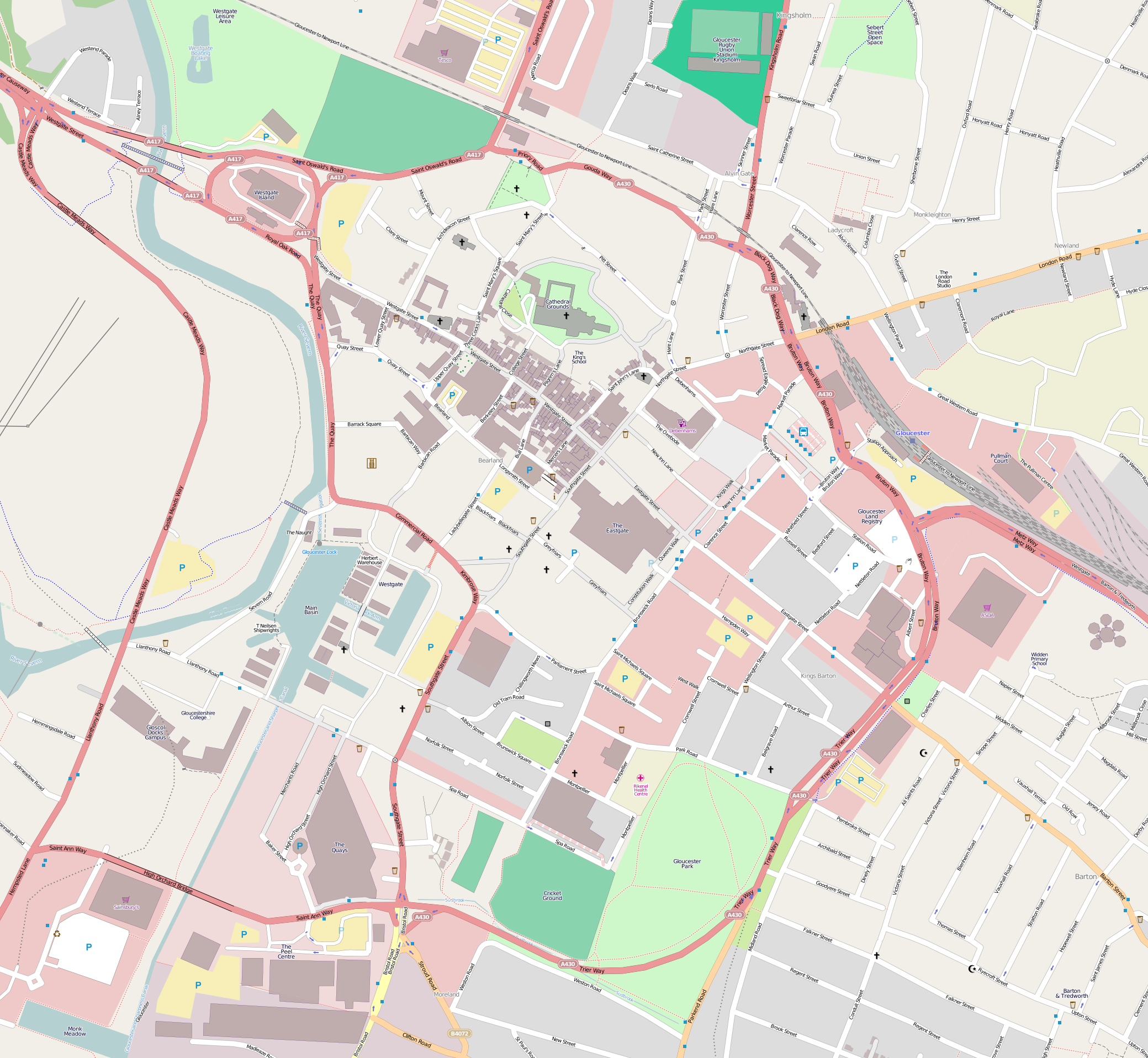
- Shown within Gloucester
- 51°52′03″N 2°14′48″W
- OS grid reference: SO 83121 18778
- Location: Gloucester, Gloucestershire
- Country: England (United Kingdom)
- Denomination: Church of England
- Previous denomination: Roman Catholic
- Website: gloucestercathedral.org.uk

History
- Status: Active
- Dedication: St Peter; Holy Trinity
- Consecrated: 15 July 1100

Architecture
- Functional status: Formerly abbey, dissolved 1540. Cathedral since 1541.
- Heritage designation: Grade I listed building
- Style: Romanesque, Gothic
- Groundbreaking: 1089
- Completed: 1482

Specifications
- Length: 426 ft 6 in (130.00 m)

Administration
- Province: Canterbury
- Diocese: Gloucester

Clergy
- Bishop: Rachel Treweek
- Dean: Andrew Zihni

Listed Building – Grade I
- Official name: Cathedral Church of the Holy and Indivisible Trinity
- Designated: 23 January 1952
- Reference no.: 1245952

Gloucester Cathedral, formally the Cathedral Church of St Peter and the Holy and Indivisible Trinity and formerly St Peter's Abbey, in Gloucester, England, stands in the north of the city near the River Severn. It originated with the establishment of a minster, Gloucester Abbey, dedicated to Saint Peter and founded by Osric, King of the Hwicce, in around 679.

The subsequent history of the church is complex; Osric's foundation came under the control of the Benedictine Order at the beginning of the 11th century and in around 1058, Ealdred, Bishop of Worcester, established a new abbey "a little further from the place where it had stood". The abbey appears not to have been an initial success, by 1072, the number of attendant monks had reduced to two. The present building was begun by Abbott Serlo in about 1089, following a major fire the previous year. Serlo's efforts transformed the abbey's fortunes; rising revenues and royal patronage enabled the construction of a major church. William the Conqueror held his Christmas Court at the chapter house in 1085, at which he ordered the compilation of Domesday Book. In October 1216, Henry III was crowned at the abbey.

After another disastrous fire in 1222, an ambitious rebuilding programme was begun. In the 14th century, the choir, transepts, and Great and Little Cloisters were reconstructed, displaying the earliest surviving example of structural fan vaulting. The cathedral contains the shrine of Edward II, who was murdered at nearby Berkeley Castle. Following the dissolution of the monasteries by Henry VIII in 1536, the abbey was refounded as a cathedral. The cathedral underwent much restoration in the 18th century, and again in the 19th. In 1989, it celebrated its 900th anniversary. In 2015, the installation of Rachel Treweek saw the Church of England appoint its first woman as a diocesan bishop. The cathedral has frequently been used as a filming location, including as a stand-in for Hogwarts in the Harry Potter movies.

The cathedral is a Grade I listed building. There are a large number of other listed buildings within the cathedral complex, many also listed at Grade I, the highest grade. These include the Treasury, the Chapter House, the Cloisters, the precinct wall and a number of the medieval gates into the cathedral enclosure. Others are listed at Grade II* and Grade II.

== History ==
=== Early history ===
The first recorded religious building on the site was a minster founded by Osric of Hwicce in around 679. A relative, Kyneburg, was consecrated as the first abbess by Bosel, Bishop of Worcester. Monastic life flourished, and the possessions of the house increased, but after 767 it seems probable that the nuns dispersed during the confusion of civil strife in England.

Beornwulf of Mercia is said to have rebuilt the church, and to have endowed a body of secular priests with the former possessions of the nuns. In 1022 Wulfstan, Bishop of Worcester, had the Benedictine rule introduced and the abbey dedicated to St Peter.

The early building history is confused; at some point in the early 11th century the monastic buildings were destroyed by fire, and it is recorded that Ealdred, Bishop of Worcester rebuilt the church in around 1058 on a site "a little further from the place where it stood, and nearer to the side of the city". (Note: The history of the early church is made more complicated by its intermingling with that of St Oswald's Priory. This foundation was established in around 909 by Æthelflæd, daughter of Alfred the Great, but was also dedicated to St Peter. Over the following centuries, as the abbey grew in wealth and importance, it incorporated elements of the priory.) The foundations of the present church were laid by Abbot Serlo (1072–1104). Appointed by William I in 1072, Serlo found a new building with a complement of only two monks and eight novices.

The situation was worsened by another major fire in 1088. But the town retained its importance as a favoured royal seat; William celebrated Christmas there in 1085 when, in discussion with his Witan in the chapter house, he initiated the assembly of Domesday Book. His support, together with that of others such as Walter de Lacy and his wife, (Note: On Walter de Lacy's death in 1085, he was buried in the chapter house at Gloucester and his son later became abbot there.) enabled Serlo to embark on a major rebuilding, and between the laying of the foundation stone in 1089 and the abbey's re-consecration in 1100, work on the nave, the apse, the crypt and the chapter house was undertaken at speed and on an "exceptional scale".

St Peter's Abbey had long enjoyed important royal connections, from its foundation, then under the patronage of William I, and in October 1216 it was chosen as the venue for the coronation of Henry III, after the death of his father, King John. The nine-year-old boy was crowned in the presence of his mother Isabella, whose bracelet was reputedly used in place of a crown.

The abbey's royal connections continued, albeit in a darker vein, in the following century. In 1327, Edward II was buried in an elaborate shrine at Gloucester, following his death at Berkeley Castle nearby. Widely believed to have been murdered, Edward was entombed at Gloucester in a lavish ceremony attended by his widow, Isabella and their young son, Edward. The abbey reputedly benefitted from substantial gifts donated by those making pilgrimage to Edward's shrine, although this is disputed. Nikolaus Pevsner suggests that the more likely source of revenue was the new king, making donations in piam memoriam.

Others support the traditional claim, and Jon Cannon, in his work, Cathedral: The great English cathedrals and the world that made them, is certain that the presence of the body of the dead king had a long-term, beneficial, impact on the abbey's fortunes, citing Henry VIII's later decision to make it a cathedral, on account of the presence of "many famous monuments of our renowned ancestors, kings of England."

However occasioned, the cathedral's improved financial position enabled another great period of building. This work included the east end of the church, the crossing tower and the cloisters, with their famed fan vaulting. St Peter's was unusual as a religious foundation in commissioning its own history, the Historia Monasterii Sancti Petri Gloucestriae. Its author, Walter Frocester (died 1412), became its first mitred abbot in 1381.

=== Dependencies ===
- In 1134, William Fitznorman gave the church of St David, Kilpeck, and the Chapel of St Mary at Kilpeck Castle to Gloucester Abbey, and a priory cell was established about 400 yards south east of the church, to house some monks displaced from Llanthony Priory by attacks of the Welsh. Kilpeck Priory closed in 1422.
- The Priory of Saints Peter, Paul and Guthlac in Hereford was a dependency of Gloucester Abbey.
- Ewenny Priory was founded by Maurice de Londres in 1141. Maurice granted the Norman church of St. Michael to the abbey of St. Peter at Gloucester, together with the church of St Brides Major and the chapel at Ogmore "in order that a convent of monks might be formed".
- In 1146 the college of Augustinian canons at Stanley St. Leonard was given to the monastery by Roger de Berkeley III, with the consent of the prior and canons, and became St. Leonard Priory. His grandfather, Roger de Berkeley I, had retired as a monk to St Peter's Abbey around 1091.

=== Dissolution and recreation ===
At its inception, the abbey stood in the see of Worcester; but its position was transformed at the Dissolution of the monasteries. Following abolition, Henry VIII created the new Diocese of Gloucester and on 3 September 1541, the abbey church became its cathedral, with John Wakeman, last abbot of Tewkesbury, as its first bishop. The diocese covered the greater part of Gloucestershire, with small parts of Herefordshire and Wiltshire. Although staunchly Royalist in its sympathies, the city, and the cathedral, escaped largely unscathed from the tumult of the English Civil War and plans for complete demolition formulated during the Commonwealth were not taken forward.

The 18th and 19th centuries saw repeated periods of reconstruction, renovation and rebuilding. Counter to the approach sometimes adopted elsewhere in the Victorian era, the 19th century restorations at Gloucester, firstly by the local architects, Frederick S. Waller and Thomas Fulljames, and latterly by George Gilbert Scott, were "on the whole, very tactful" [see box]. (Note: George Gilbert Scott's plans for the restoration of Tewkesbury Abbey saw a furious assault from William Morris, who subsequently founded the Society for the Protection of Ancient Buildings to fight against the "scraping" he considered was so often the result of Victorian restoration.) During the Second World War a recess in the crypt was used to house the Coronation Chair, which had been moved in August 1939 from Westminster Abbey for safe keeping. The 13th century bog-oak effigy of Robert Curthose was placed on the chair and the whole covered by sandbags. The Great East Window was also dismantled and placed in storage. The remainder of the 10,000 sandbags supplied by the Office of Works were used to protect the other monuments in the cathedral, including the tomb of Edward II.

=== Modern period ===
The cathedral celebrated its 900th anniversary in 1989. In 2015 Rachel Treweek was installed as bishop, the first woman to be appointed to a diocesan bishopric in the history of the Church of England. In September 2016 Gloucester Cathedral joined the Church of England's 'Shrinking the footprint' campaign, intended to reduce the Church of England's carbon emissions by 80% by 2050. The cathedral commissioned a solar array on the cathedral roof which is expected to reduce the cathedral's energy costs by 25%. The installation was completed by November 2016, making the 927-year-old cathedral the oldest one in the UK with a solar installation.
A redevelopment of the former car park area next to the south side of the cathedral was finished in 2018, making the car park a landscaped green space under the 'Project Pilgrim' initiative.

== Architecture ==
=== Cathedral church ===
The cathedral consists of a Norman nave (Walter de Lacy is buried there), with additions in every style of Gothic architecture. It is 420 feet (130 m) long, and 144 feet (44 m) wide, with a fine central tower of the 15th century rising to the height of 225 ft (69 m) and topped by four delicate pinnacles.

The crypt, nave and chapter house date from the late 11th century. The crypt is one of the four apsidal cathedral crypts in England, the others being at Worcester, Winchester and Canterbury. The nave was begun in 1089. The church was largely complete by 1100. In the early 12th century, the western towers were added; the south tower collapsed around 1165.

In 1222, a fire damaged the timber roof and several of the monastic buildings. To repair the damage and update the architectural style, an ambitious building campaign was launched, including the revaulting of the nave Early English style (completed 1243); the construction of the central tower (begun 1237); the rebuilding of the collapsed south tower (completed 1246); and the rebuilding of the refectory.

The south aisle was rebuilt in 1318–29. The most notable monument is the canopied shrine of Edward II of England who was murdered at nearby Berkeley Castle in 1327. Pilgrimages to the tomb brought a huge influx of cash enabling the rebuilding and redecorating of the south transept (1329–37), the north transept (1368–73), and the choir (1350–77). The Norman choir walls are sheathed in Perpendicular tracery. The multiplication of ribs, liernes and bosses in the choir vaulting is particularly rich.

Between the apsidal chapels is a cross Lady chapel, and north of the nave are the cloisters, the carrels or stalls for the monks' study and writing lying to the south. In a side-chapel is a monument in coloured bog oak of Robert Curthose, eldest son of William the Conqueror and a great benefactor of the abbey, who was interred there. Monuments of William Warburton (Bishop of Gloucester) and Edward Jenner (physician) are also worthy of note. The coronation of Henry III is commemorated in a stained-glass window in the south aisle.

Between 1873 and 1890, and in 1897, the cathedral was extensively restored by George Gilbert Scott. The cathedral has forty-six 14th-century misericords and twelve 19th-century replacements by Gilbert Scott. Both types have a wide range of subject matter: mythology, everyday occurrences, religious symbolism and folklore. Among these is a depiction of people playing a ball game, which has been suggested as one of the earliest images of medieval football.

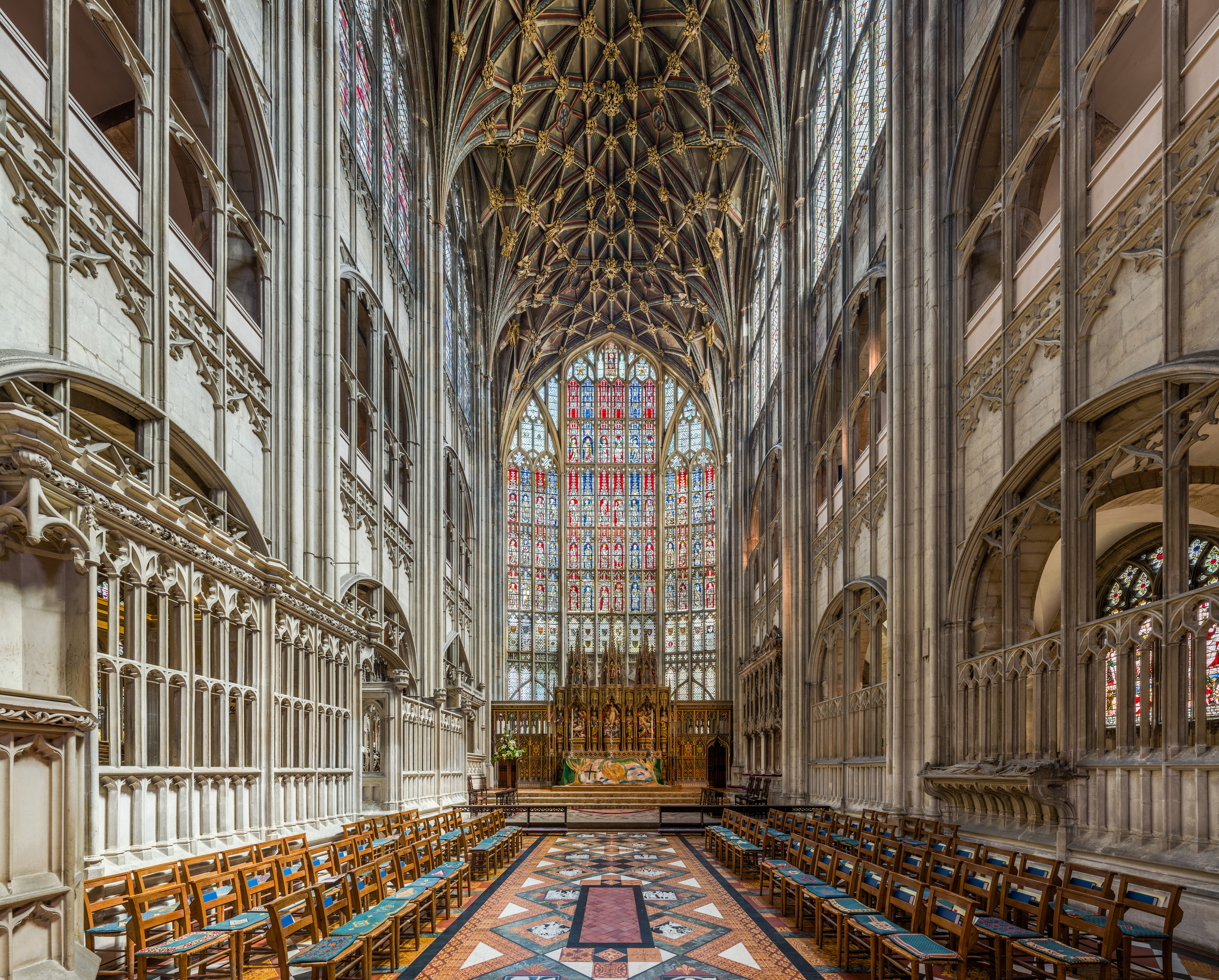
The Quire with the Great East Window behind - in 1350, when installed, it was the largest window in the world

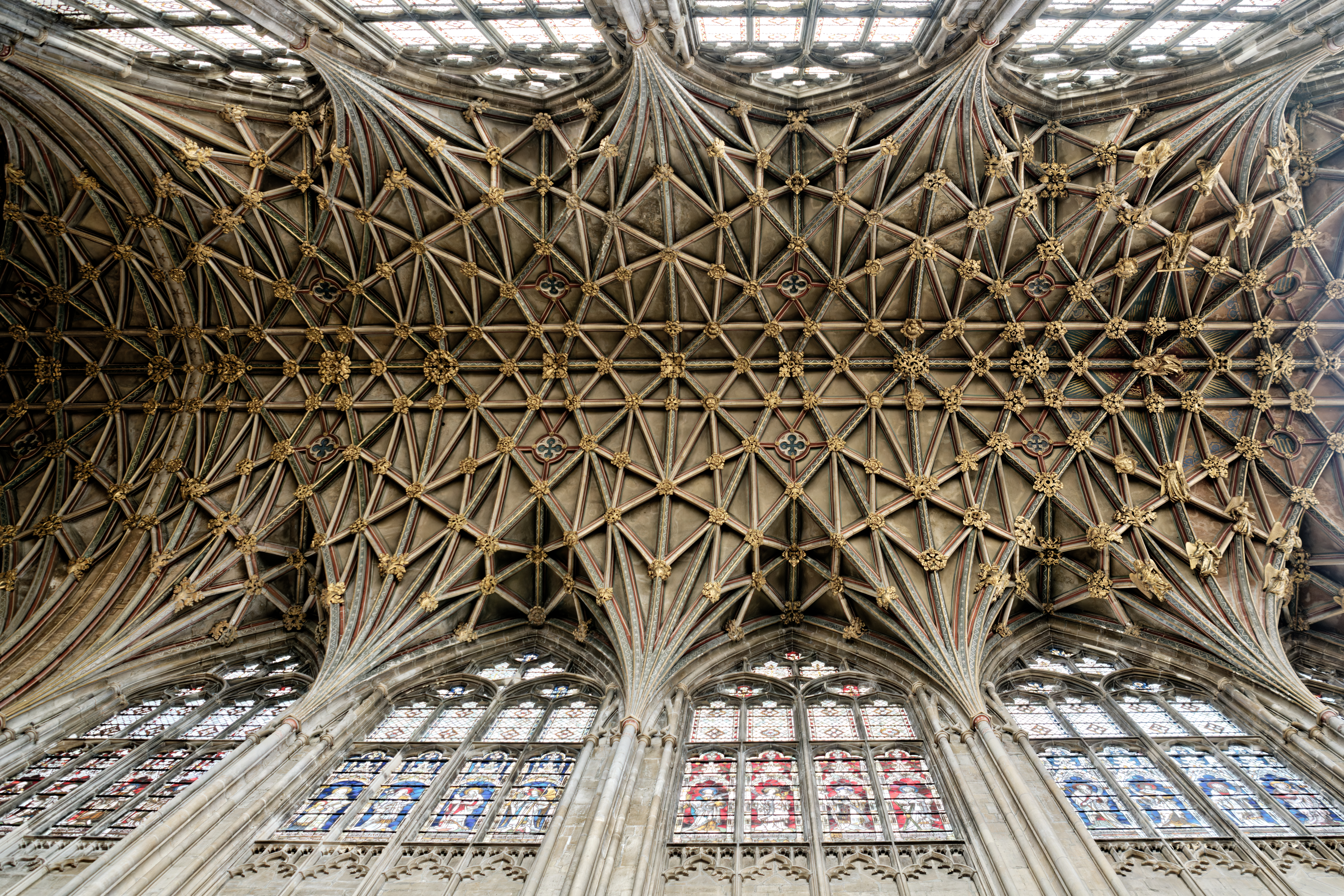
The Quire's vaulted ceiling

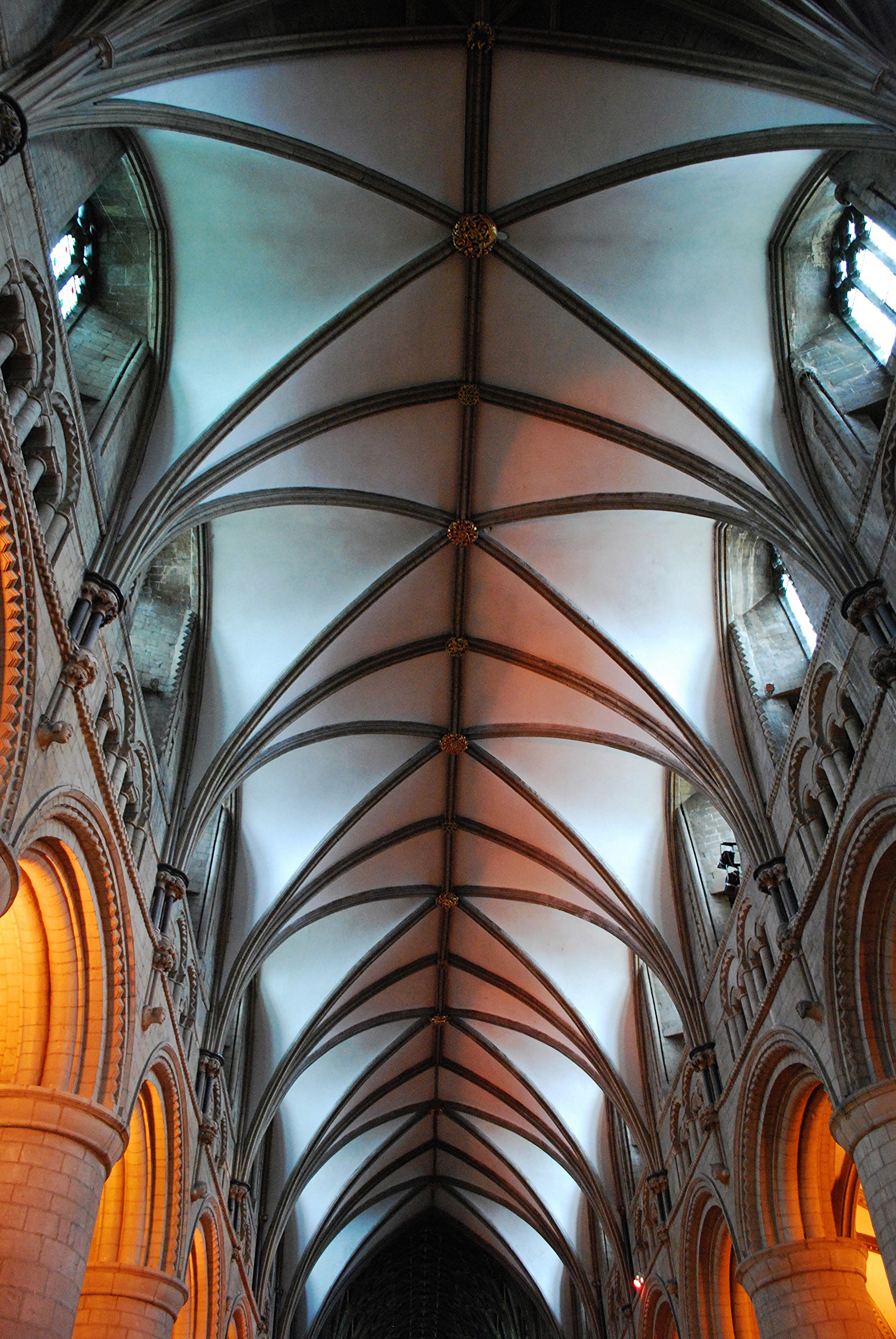
The vaulted ceiling of the Nave

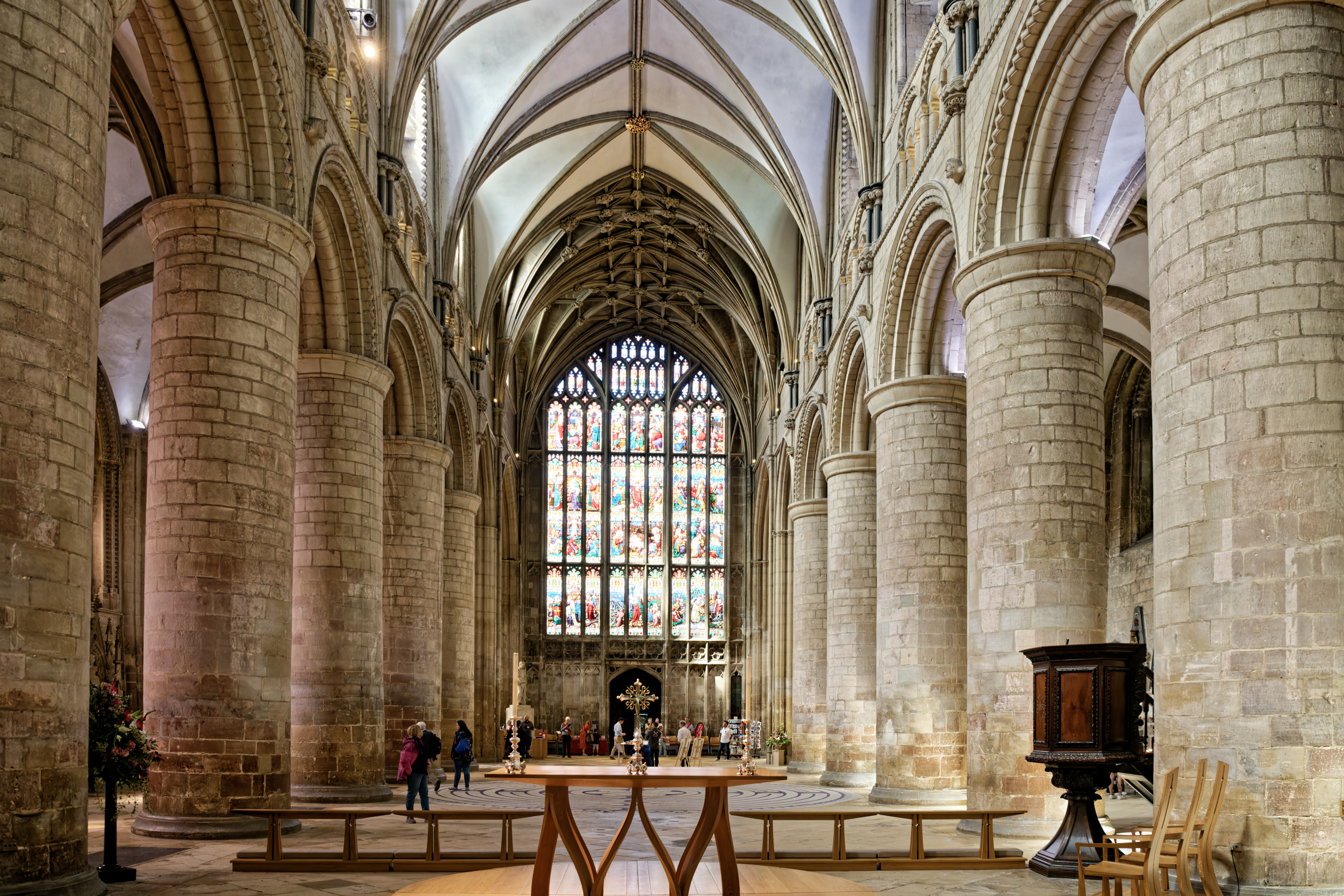
The Nave from the east

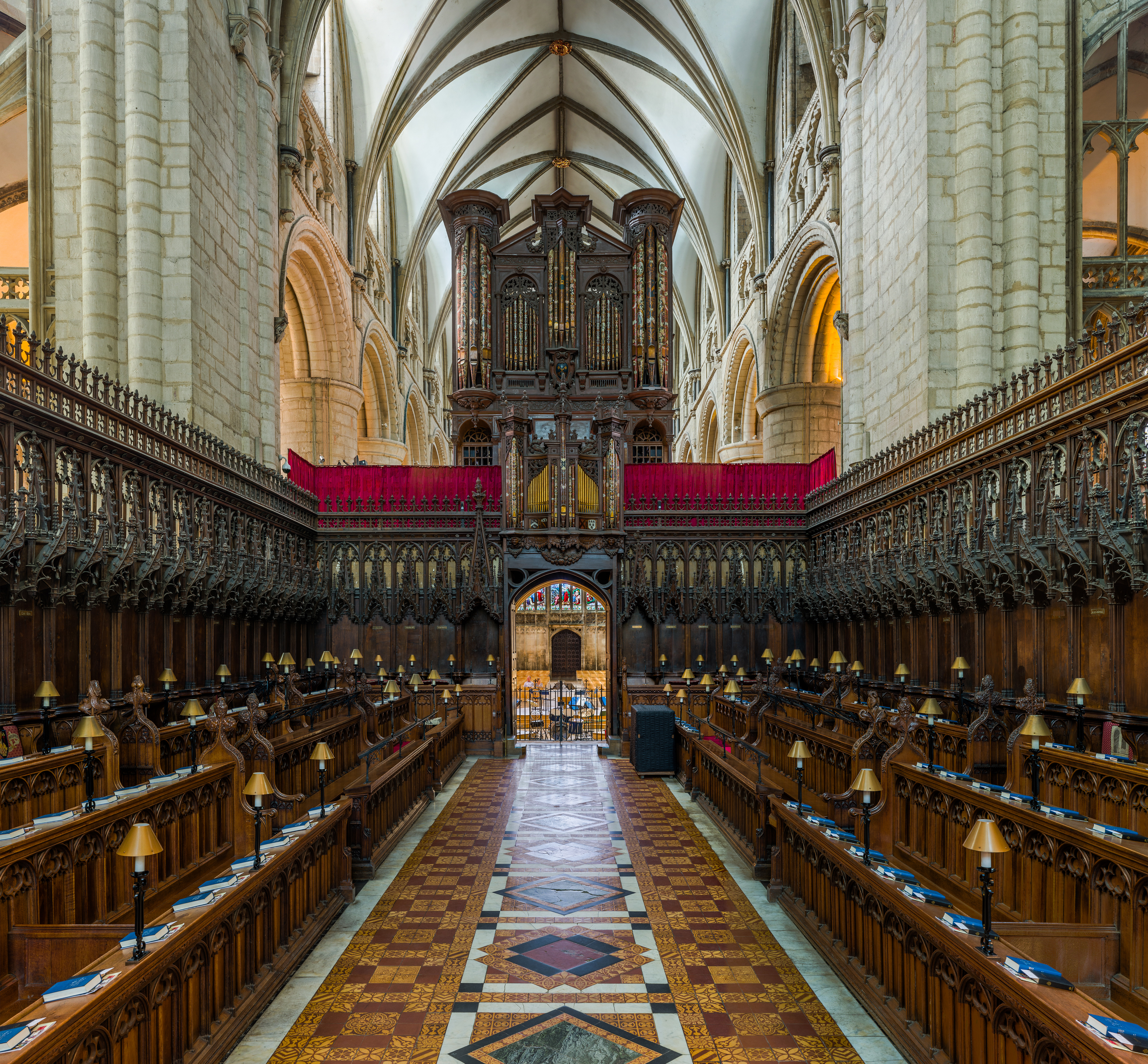
Facing west towards the choir, with the organ above

=== Stained glass ===
The stained glass at Gloucester Cathedral dates from the 14th century to the 21st century. The principal medieval feature is the Great East Window, installed in the 1350s as part of the remodelling of the east end following the burial of Edward II. At 22 metres high by 12 metres wide, it was reputed to be the largest window in the world at the time of its installation and remains one of the largest surviving medieval stained glass windows in England. The central composition shows the Virgin Mary and Christ in Majesty, flanked by the twelve apostles; the surrounding figures and imagery reflect the hierarchical makeup of society and divine order as it was understood in the Middle Ages. One pane is said to depict the earliest known image of the game of golf, created more than 300 years before than the first depiction of golf from Scotland.

The Great West Window, which takes as its theme the Nativity of Jesus and the sacrament of Baptism, was designed by William Wailes and installed in 1859. The Lady Chapel was furnished with windows made by the Arts and Crafts designer Christopher Whall, between 1899 and 1910, with the exception of the south-east window, which is by Heaton, Butler and Bayne. In the chantry chapel to the south of the Lady Chapel, is a 1929 window by Veronica Whall in memory of organist Sir Alfred Brewer, which depicts musical angels. In the same chapel is a 1992 window by Caroline Swash commemorating the composer Herbert Howells. Also installed in 1992 are three windows in the St Thomas Chapel, designed and made by Thomas Denny, taking as their theme St Thomas and Psalm 148. Denny is also responsible for two more windows in the Cathedral, both in chantry chapel to the north of the Lady Chapel. His 2013 window commemorates the poet and composer Ivor Gurney, while the second, installed in 2016, remembers the composer Gerald Finzi.

The Great East Window (mid-14th Century)

Central detail of Great East Window, showing St Thomas, St Peter, the Virgin Mary, Jesus, St Paul and St John the Evangelist

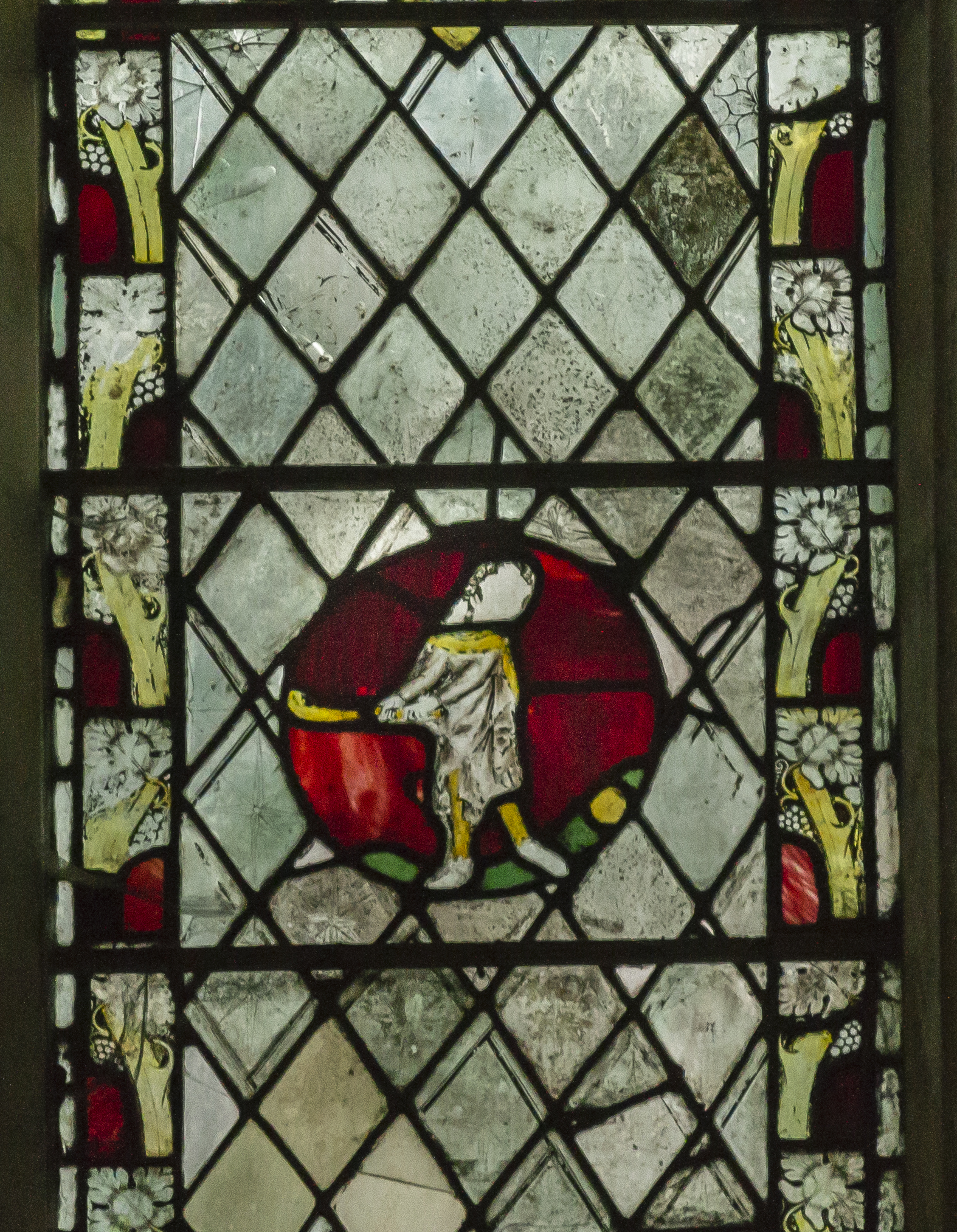
Roundel in the Great East Window said to be the earliest known depiction of the game of golf

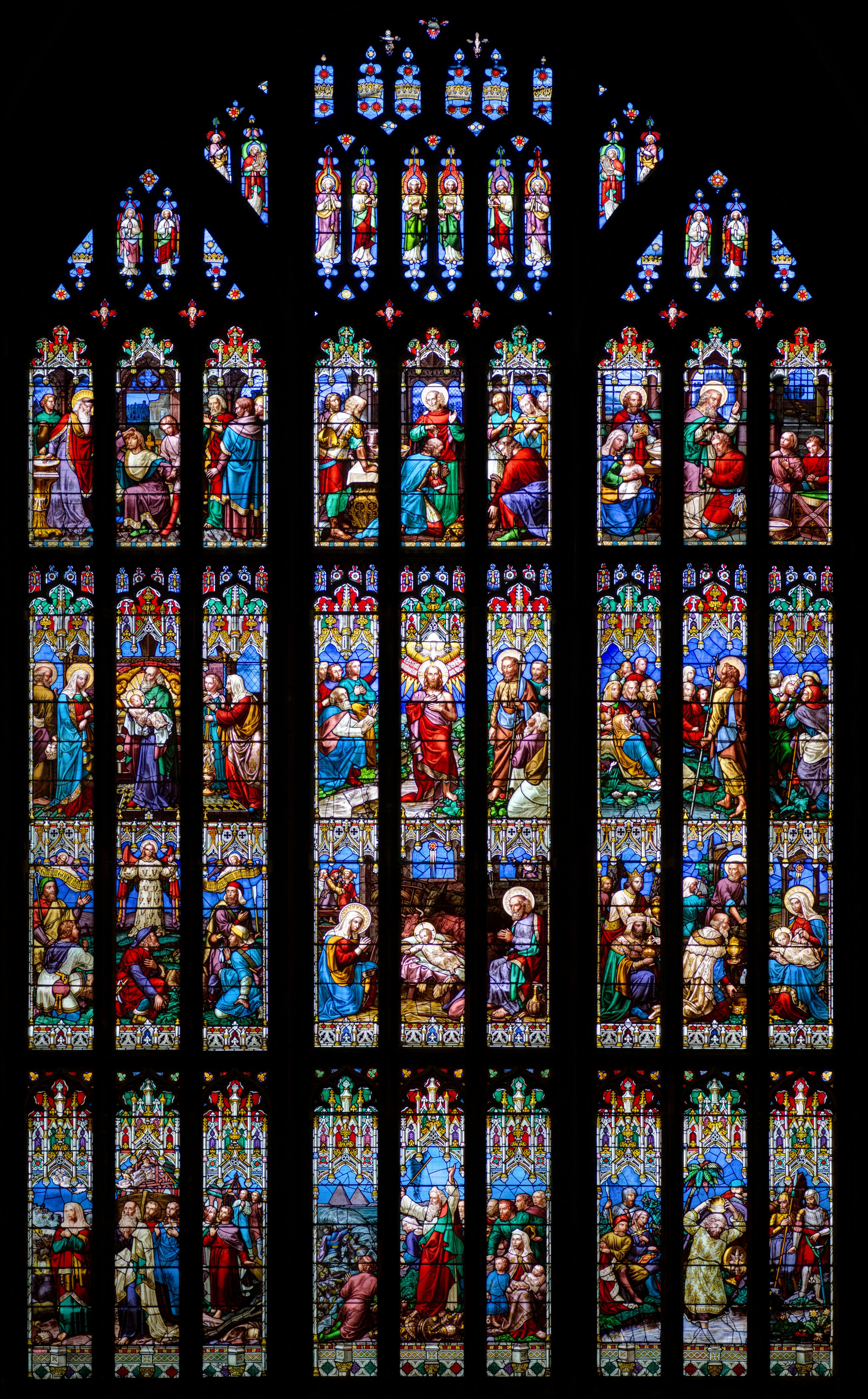
The Great West Window - William Wailes (1859)

Lady Chapel Annunciation window - Christopher Whall (1901)

Lady Chapel Childhood of the Virgin window - Christopher Whall (1901)

Lady Chapel Nativity window - Christopher Whall (1901)

Alfred Brewer memorial window - Veronica Whall (1929)

Herbert Howells memorial window - Caroline Swash (1992)

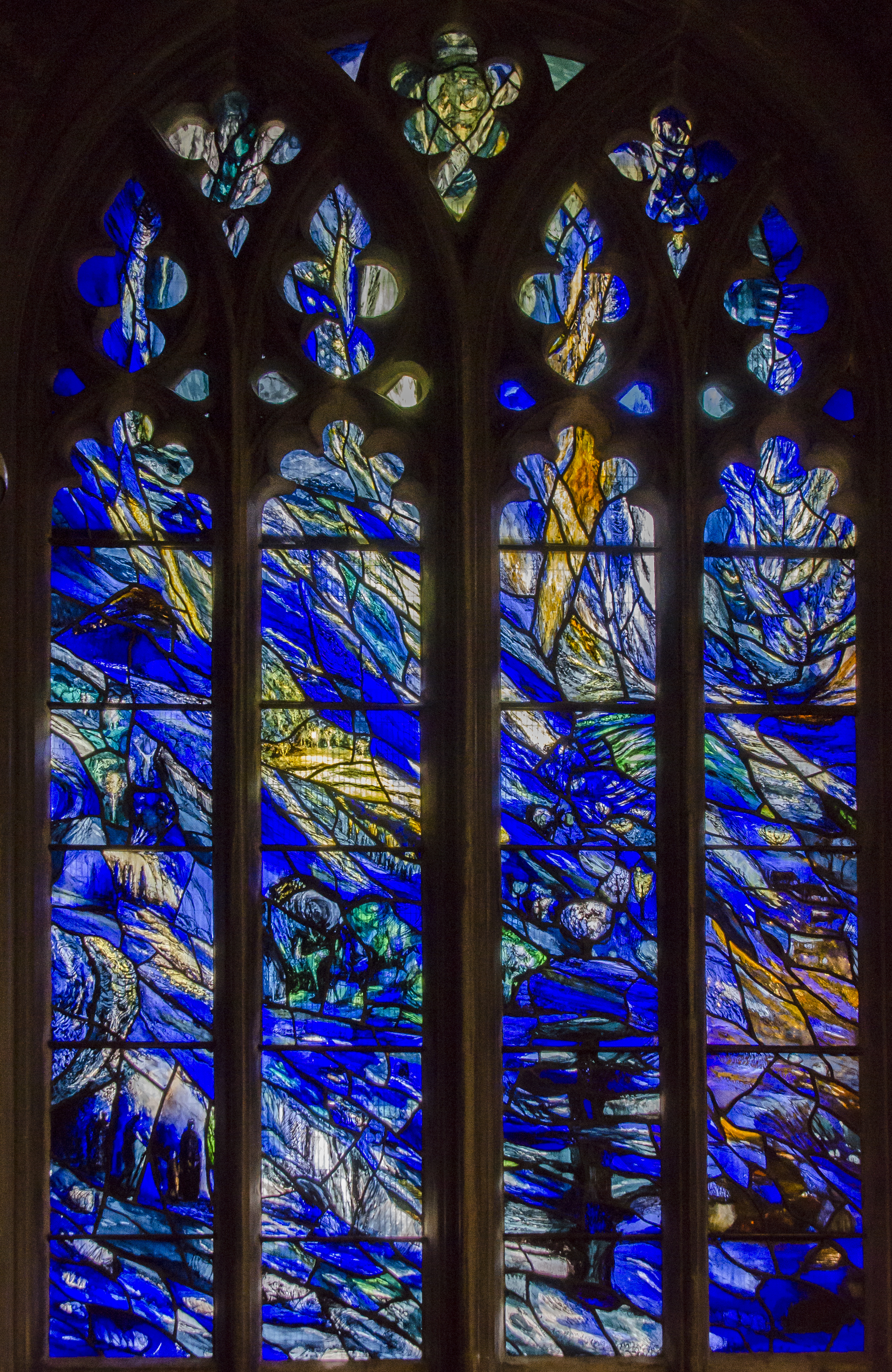
St Thomas Chapel windows, left - Thomas Denny (1992)

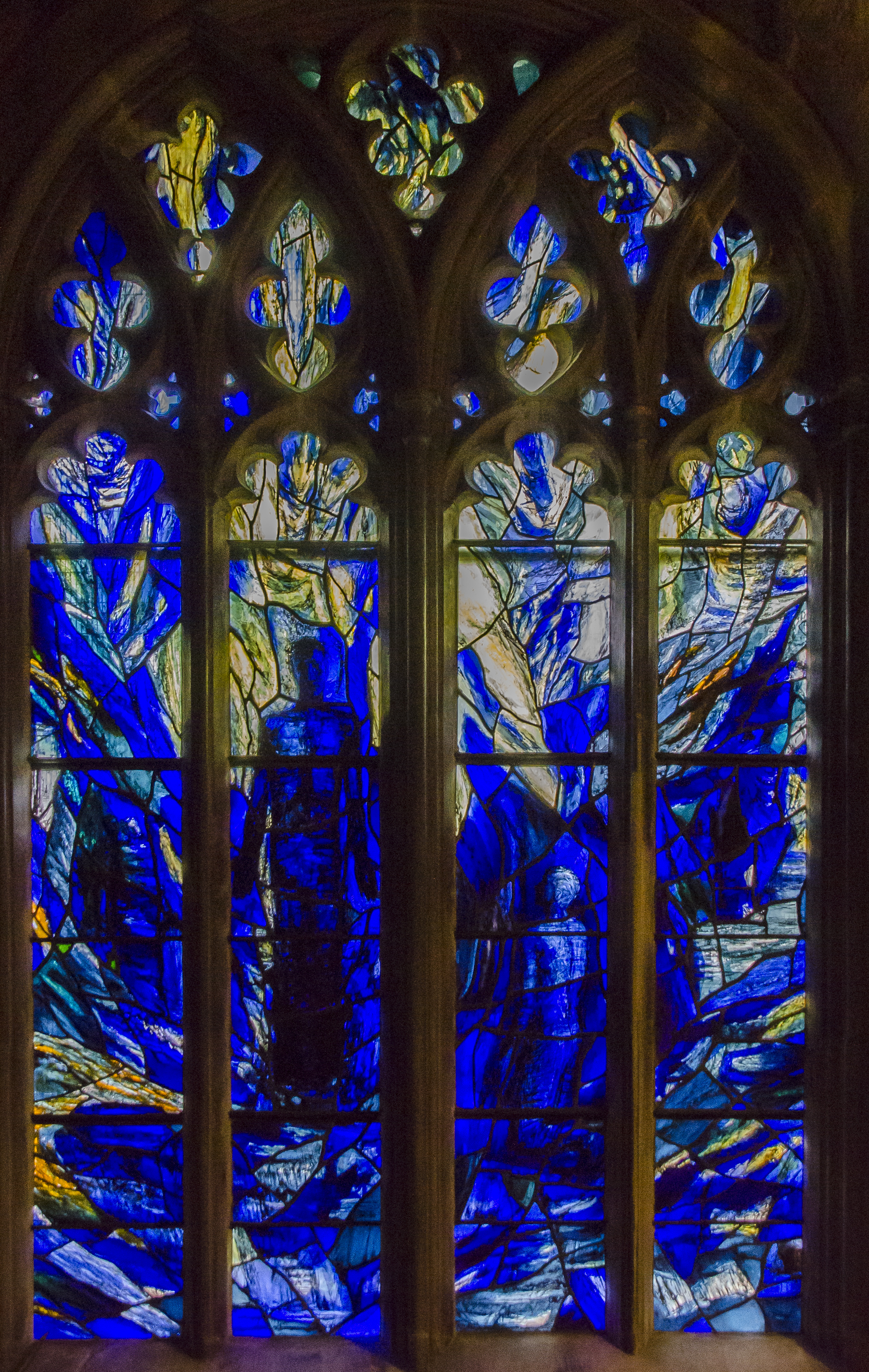
St Thomas Chapel windows, centre - Thomas Denny (1992)

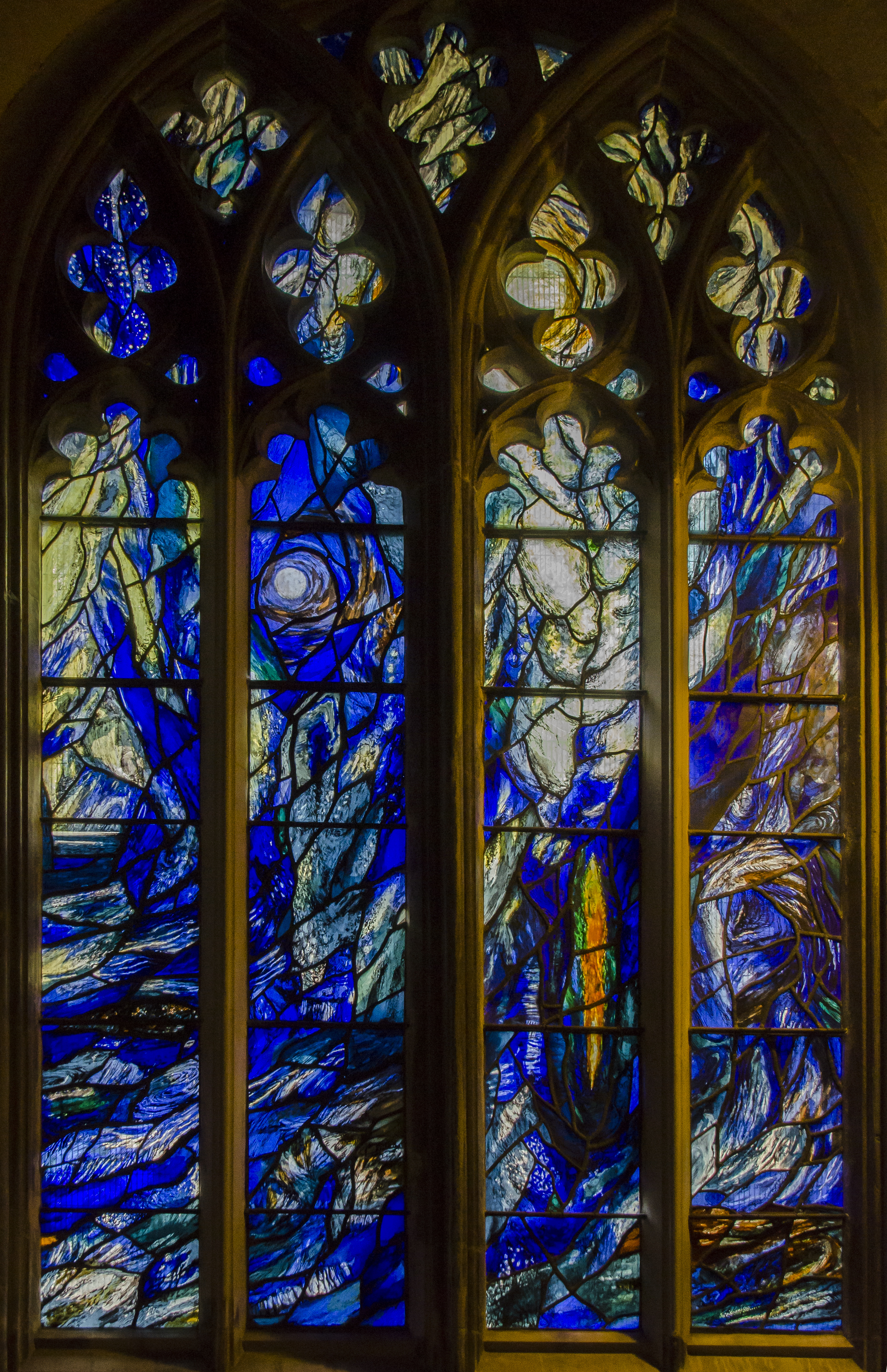
St Thomas Chapel windows, right (1992) - Thomas Denny (1992)

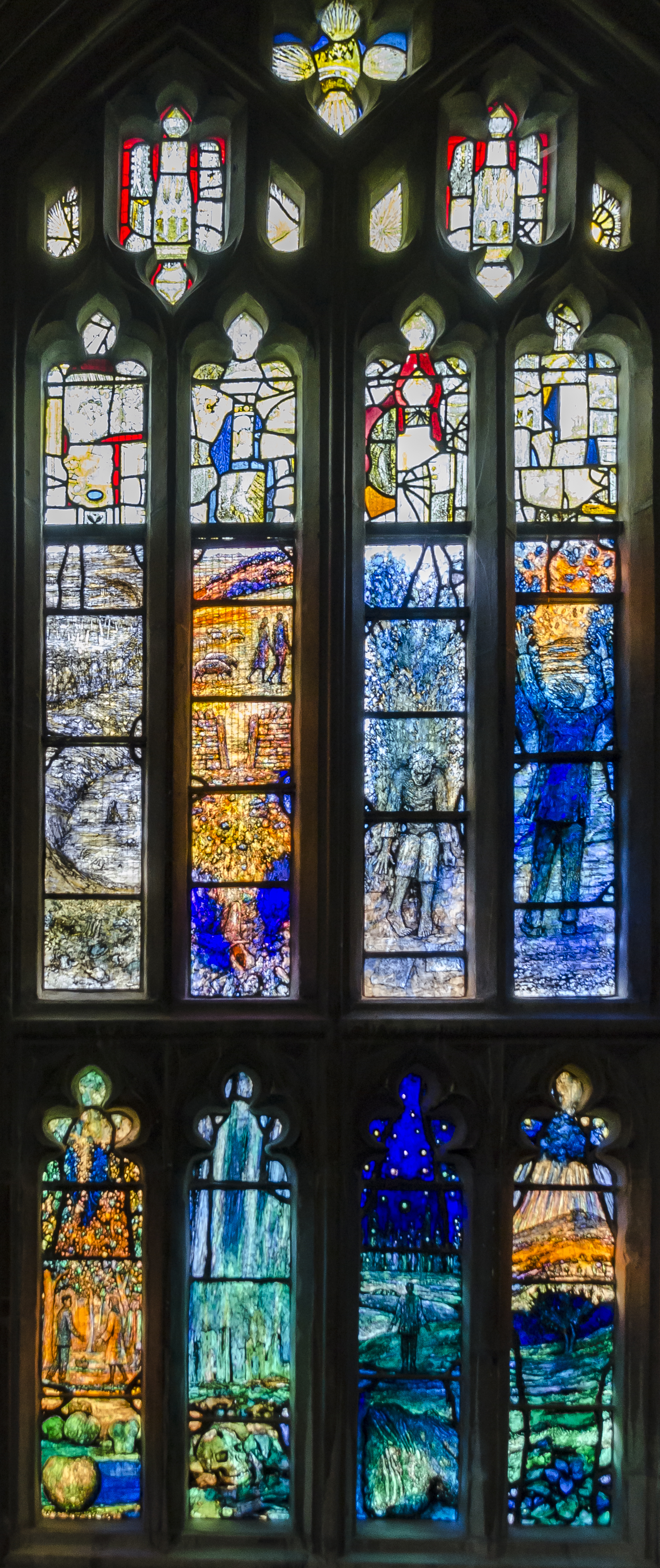
Ivor Gurney memorial window - Thomas Denny (2014)

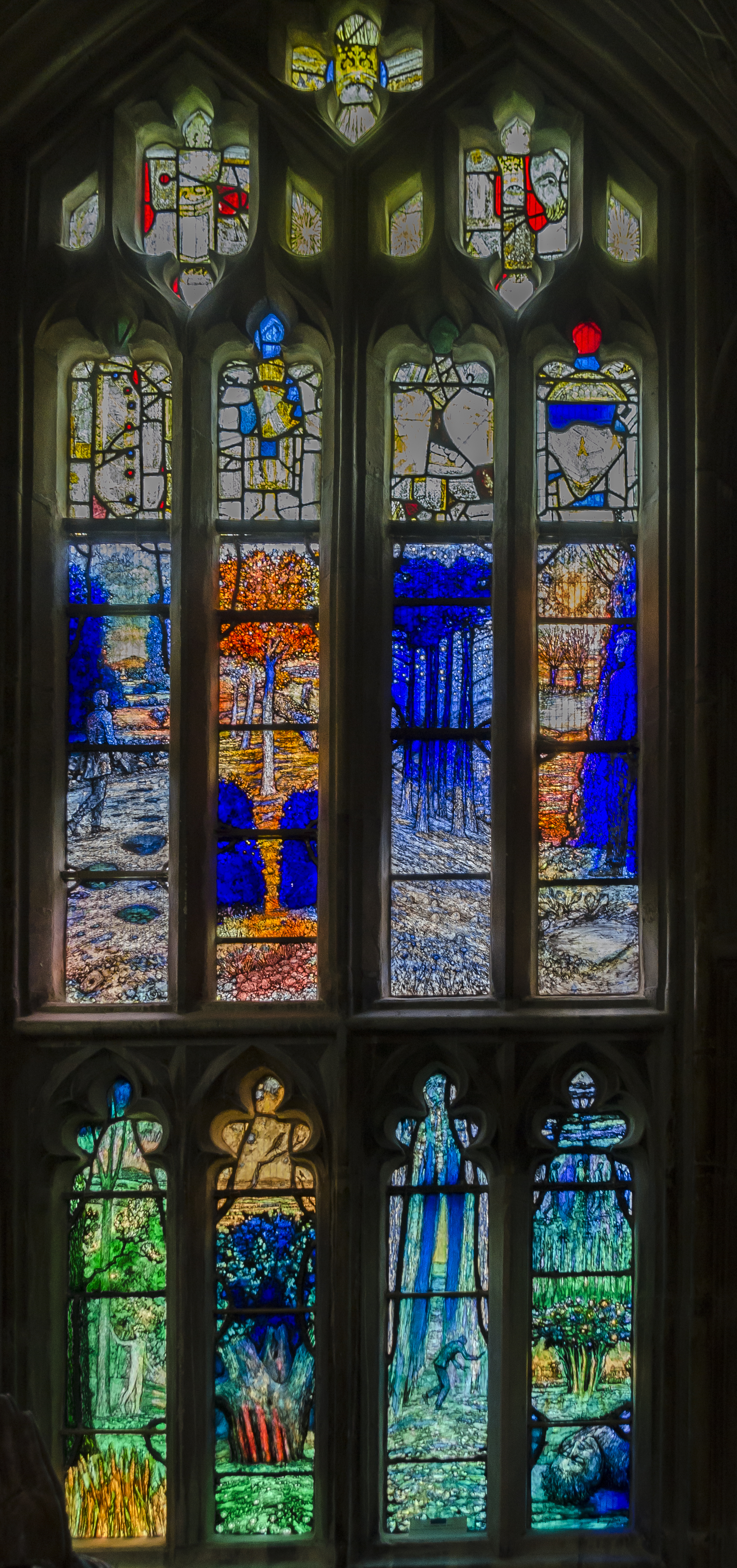
Gerald Finzi memorial window - Thomas Denny (2016)

=== Cloisters and cathedral precincts ===
The cloisters at Gloucester are the earliest surviving fan vaults in England, having been designed between 1351 and 1377 by Thomas de Cantebrugge. (Note: Thomas of Catebrugge (of Canterbury) also undertook work at Hereford Cathedral.) David Verey and Alan Brooks, in the 2002 revised volume, Gloucestershire 2: The Vale and the Forest of Dean, in the Pevsner Buildings of England series, call them "the most memorable in England". The cathedral itself suggests that they form "the first and best example of fan vaulting in the world". (Note: Gloucester Cathedral also has a Little Cloister, extending from the northeast corner of the Great Cloisters.)

The cloisters stand to the north of the cathedral and, along with the cathedral precincts to the north and east, contain a number of listed buildings. The Great Cloister itself is listed at Grade I, as are the Little Cloister and Little Cloister House, the remains of a reservoir in the north-west corner of the Great Cloister and a passage from the cloister to the former Infirmary, the remains of the infirmary itself, and the north Precinct Wall.

The other major structures within the precincts are the Chapter house and the Treasury and library. They date initially from the 11th century, although they have undergone major reconstruction in subsequent centuries. Both are Grade I listed buildings. The treasury adjoins the main cathedral on its northern side, with the library above it, and the chapter house adjoins the treasury.

Other structures in the precincts now form part of King's School, Gloucester including: the remains of the Abbott's lodgings and Dulverton House, both listed at Grade II*, and the gymnasium, Dulverton House Coachhouse, Wardle House, Palace Cottage and a set of railings surrounding a playground, all of which are listed at Grade II.

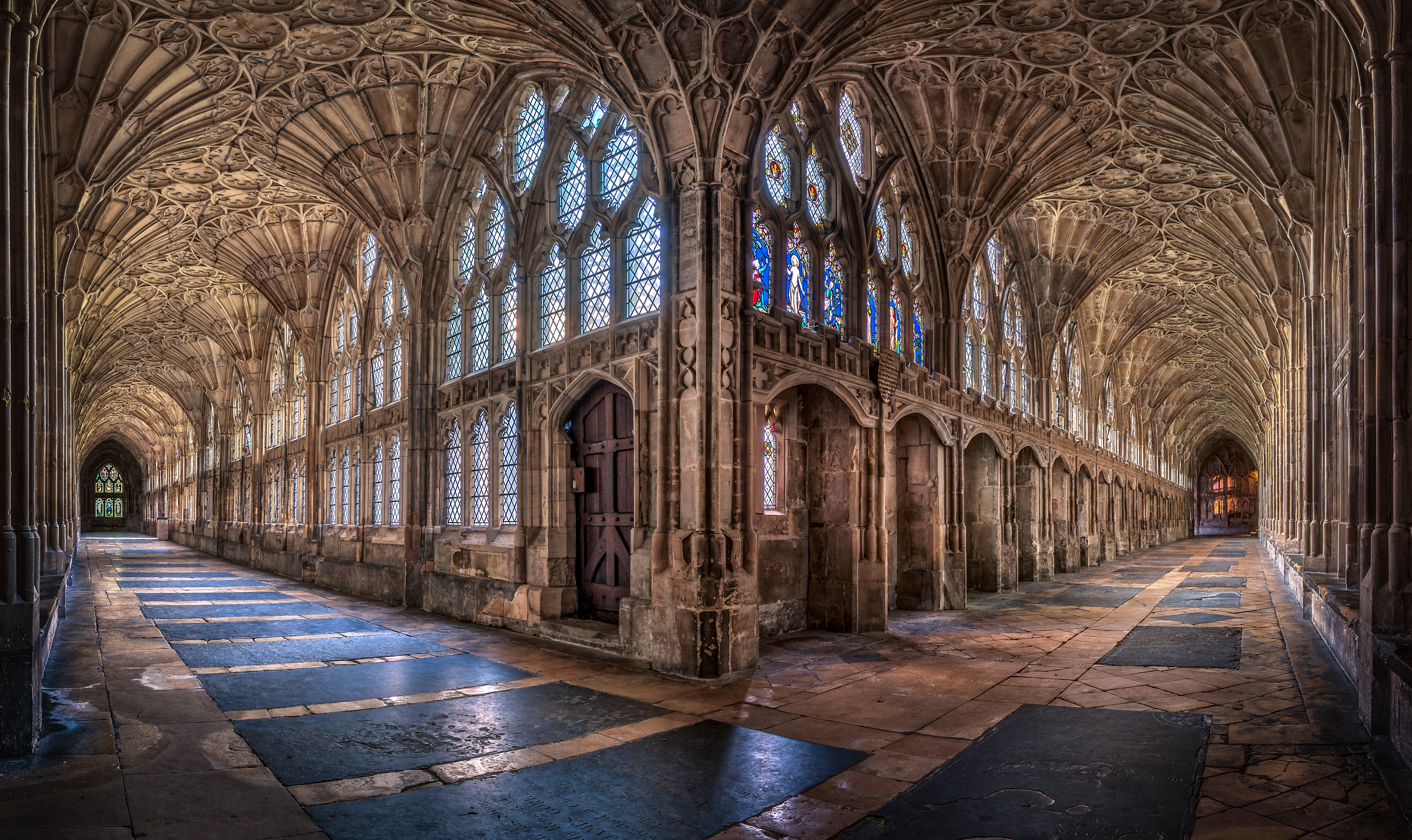
The Great Cloister

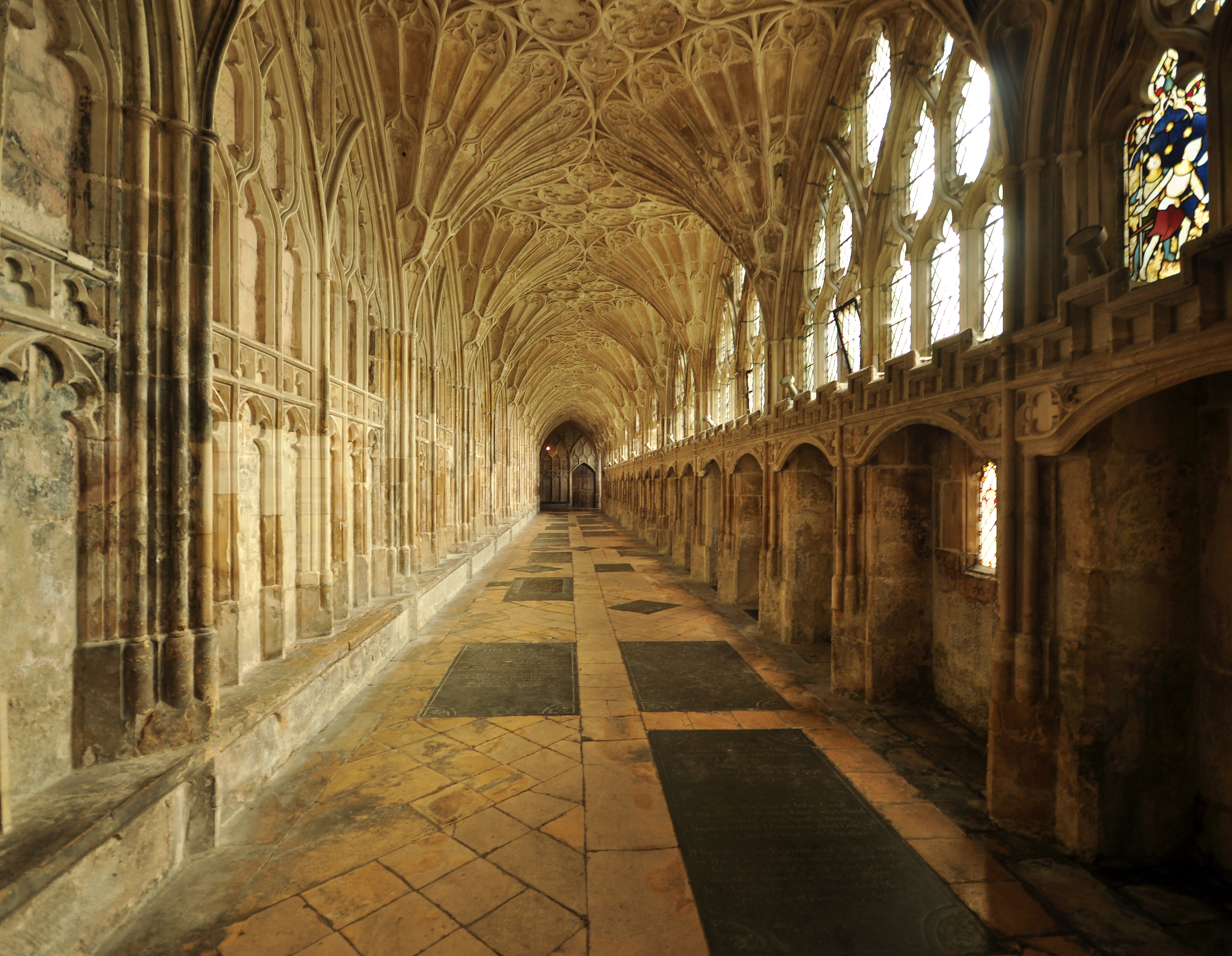
Another view

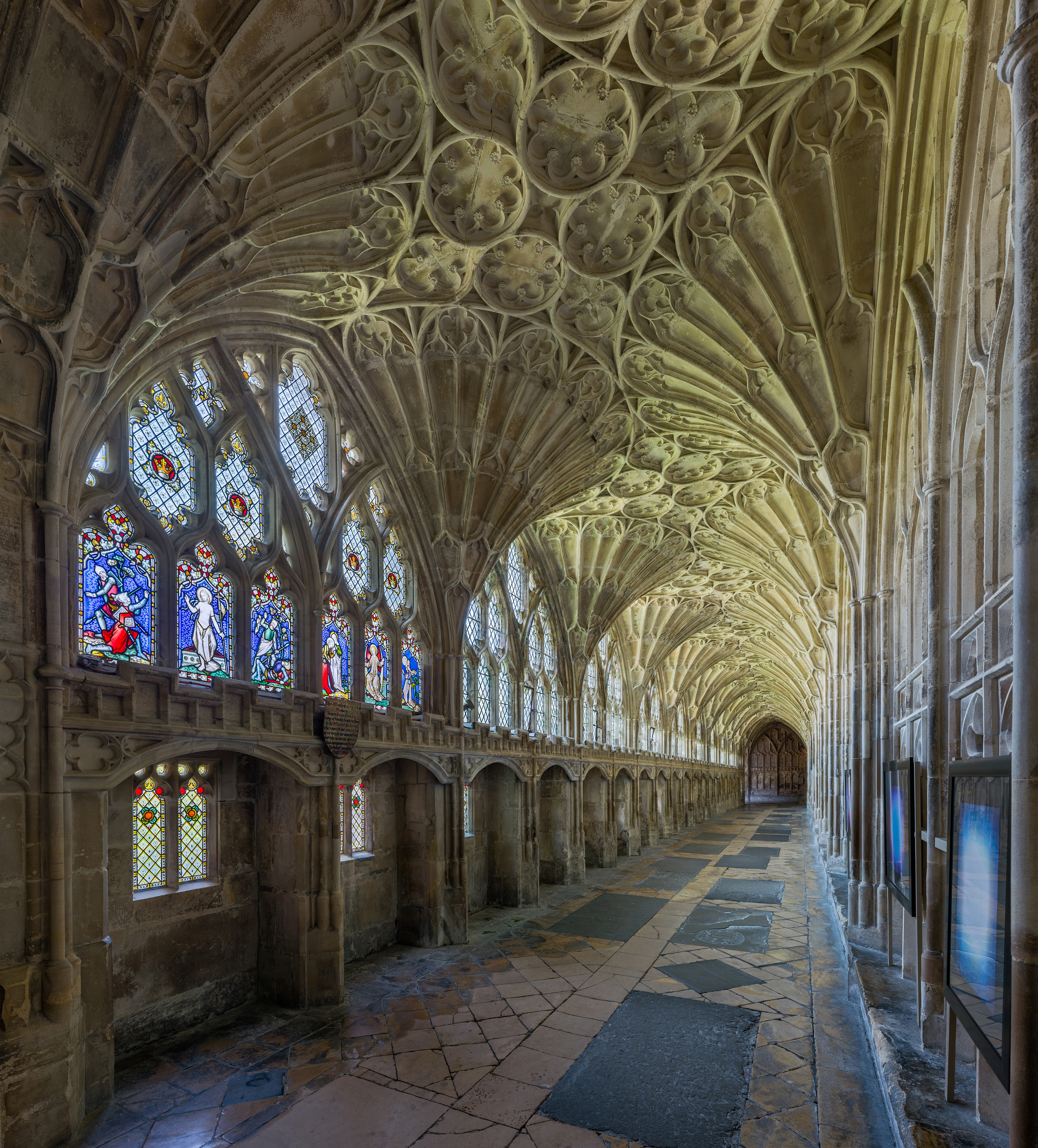
Another view

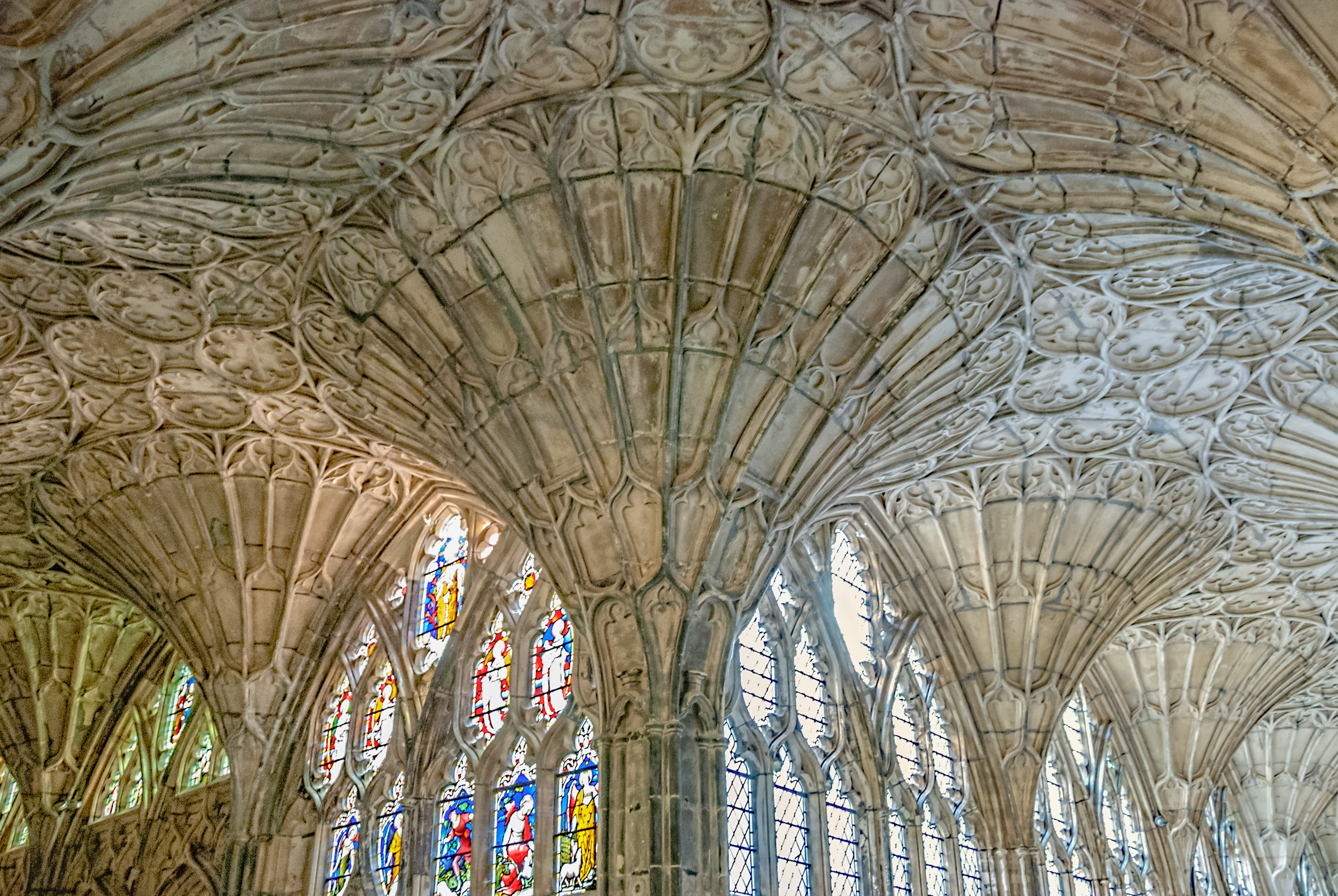
Fan vaulting

Door into the cloister from the west slype

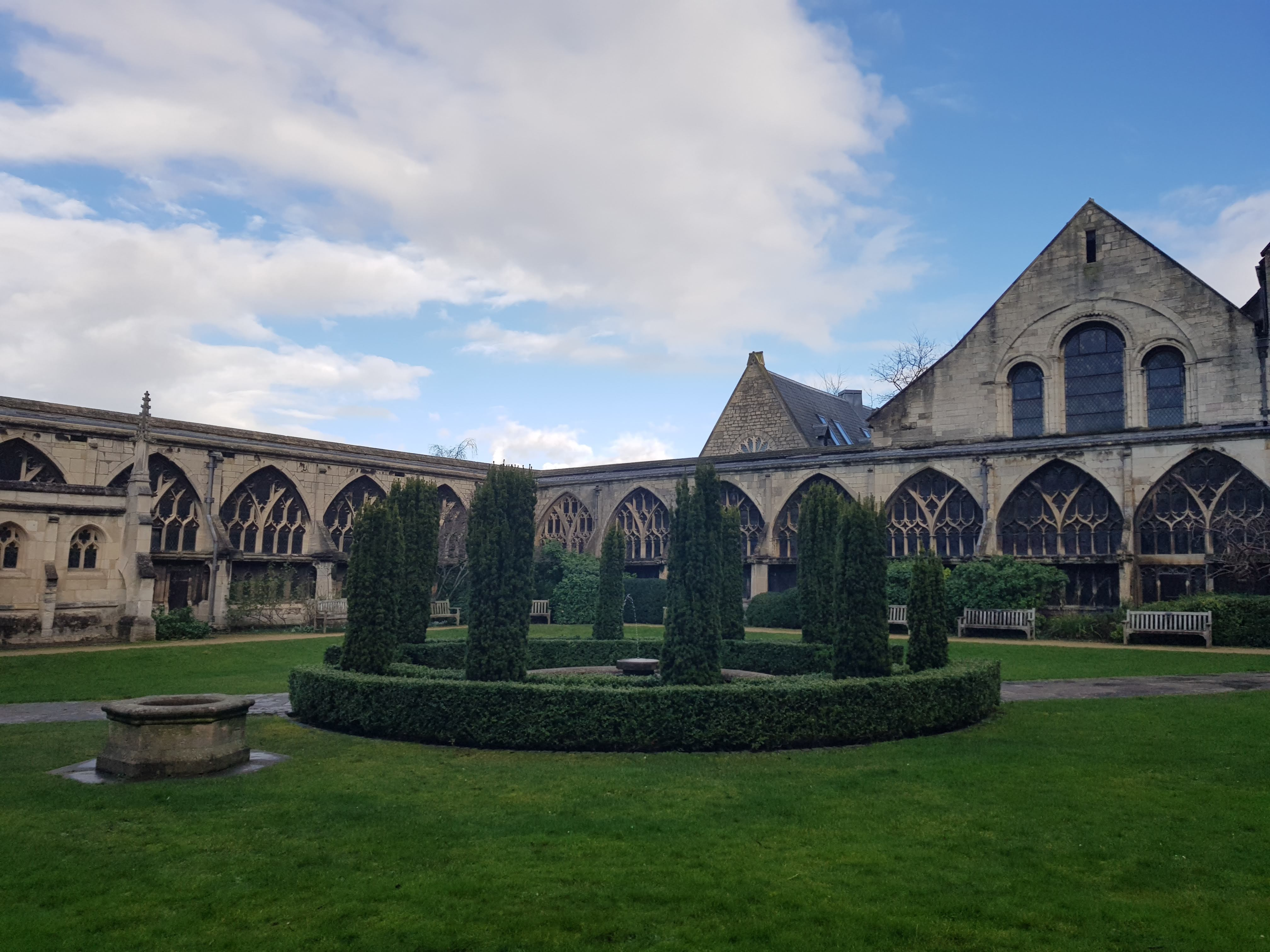
The cloister garth (central courtyard)

=== College Green and Miller's Green ===
Plaques at the gates to the cathedral close

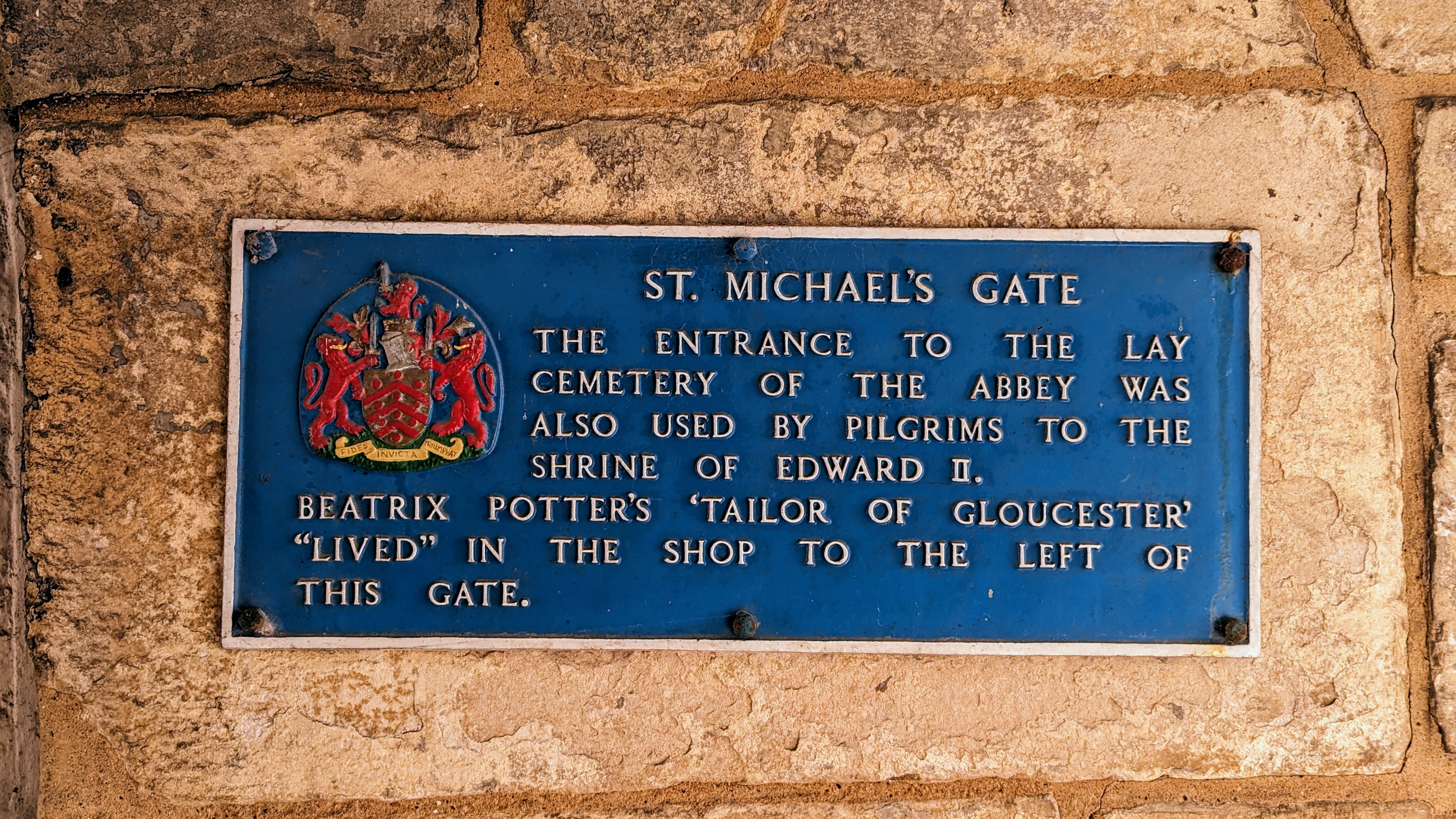
Plaque at St Michael's Gate

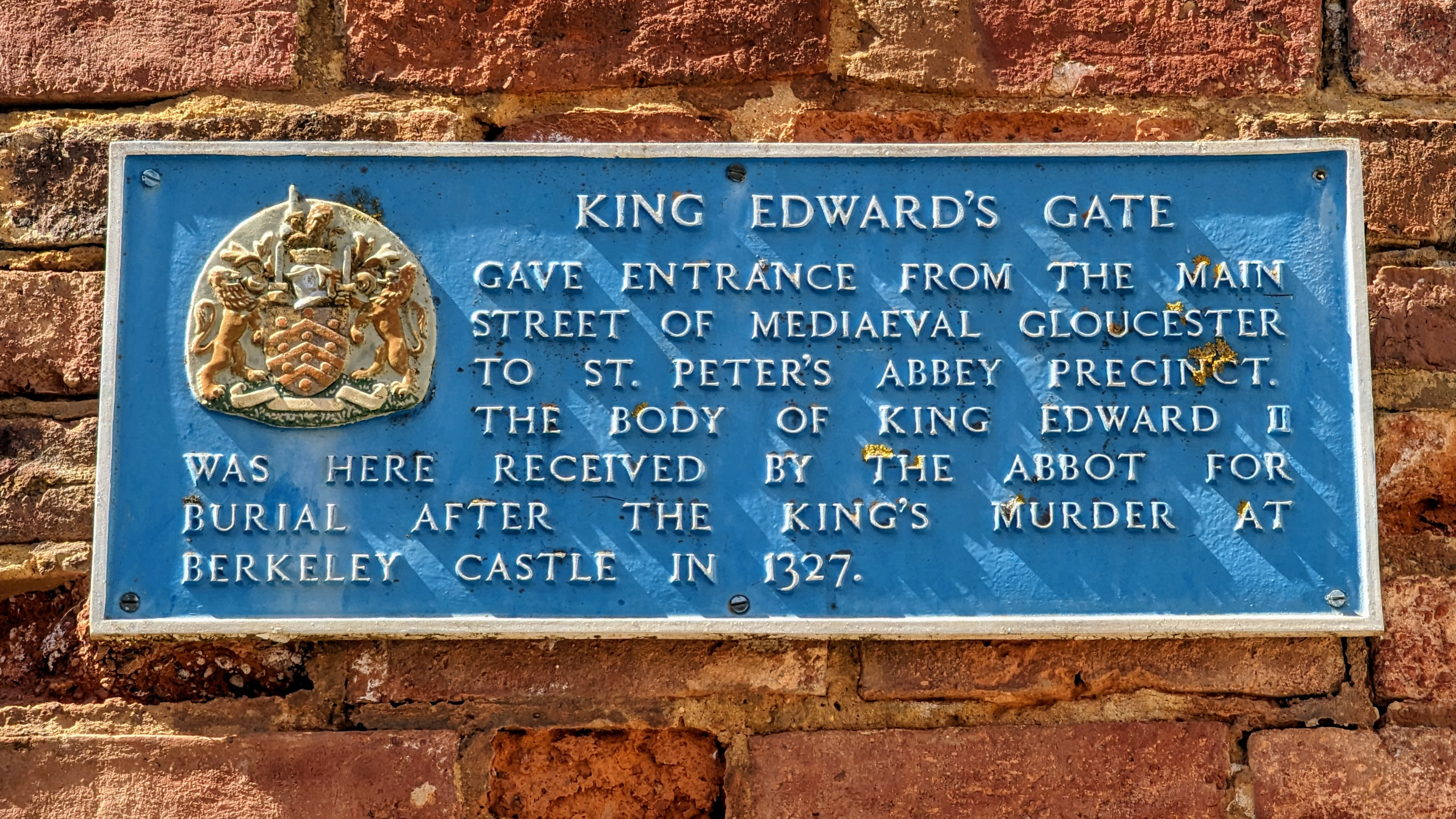
Plaque at King Edward's Gate

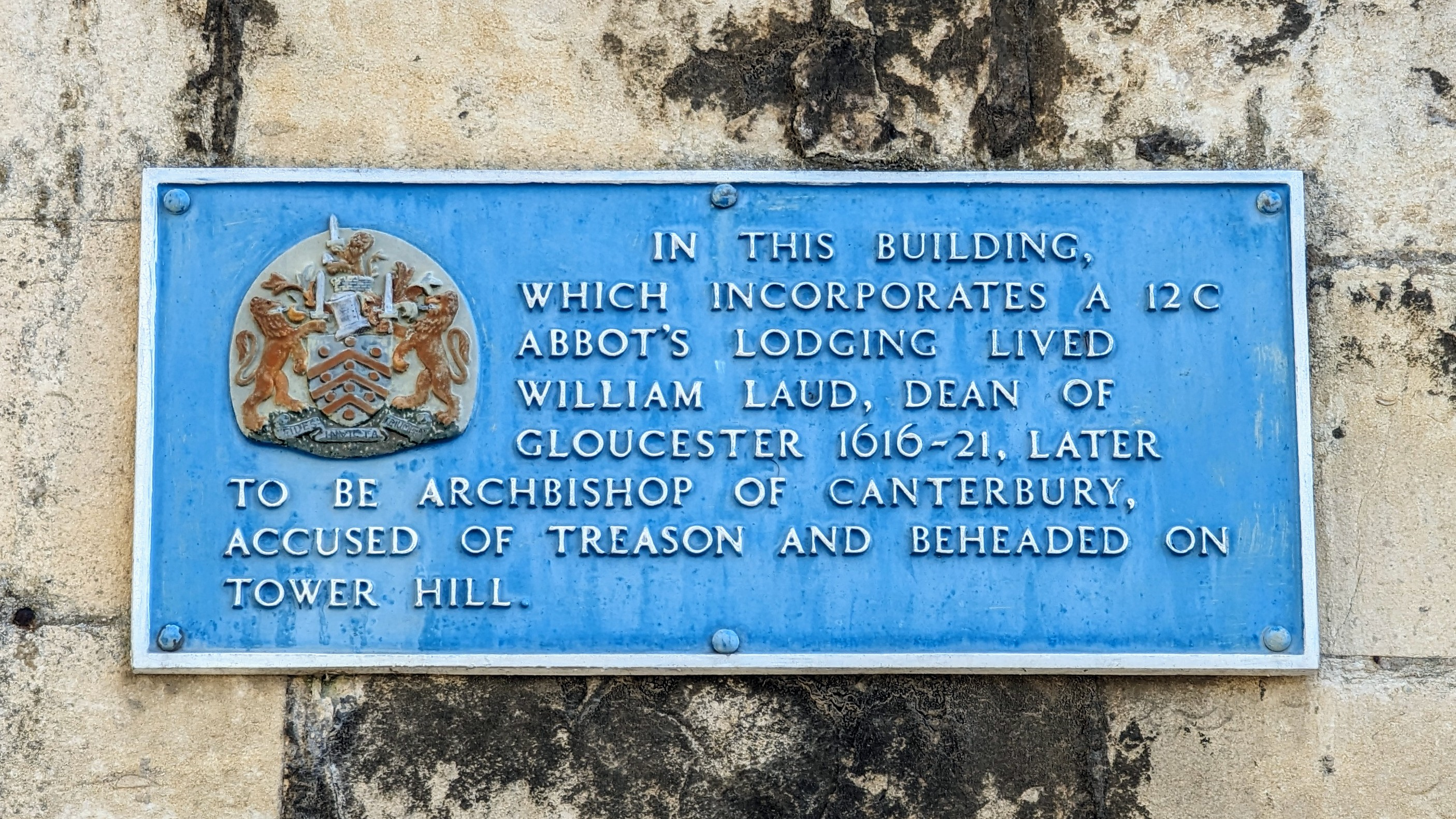
Plaque at the Abbott's lodge

College Green lies to the south and west of the cathedral, forming its cathedral close. It was originally the site of a series of monastic graveyards, but was largely rebuilt in the 18th century when many of the buildings were converted to domestic use.

Miller's Green forms a close to the north of the cathedral and was originally the monastic service court. Both Miller's Green and College Green contain a large number of listed buildings. College Green is entered through St Michael's Gate, which dates from the 14th century and is listed at Grade I. No.s 1, 2, 3, and 4 are listed Grade II and stand between St Michael's Gate and King Edward's Gate, which dates from the 16th century, was subject to a major restoration in the 19th century and is listed at II*. No.s 6, 7, and 8 conclude the south-western edge of the green and are all listed at Grade II.

No.9 College Green begins the western range of the close and is listed Grade II*. The western range includes No.s 10, 11, 12, Beaufort House, and 13, all of which are listed at Grade II, and concludes with No. 14, which is listed Grade II*.

The close is broken by St Mary's Gateway, a scheduled monument. The War Memorial to the Royal Gloucestershire Hussars Yeomanry, a Grade II* listed structure, stands in the centre of College Green. The northern side of College Green concludes with No. 15, Community House, which is Grade II listed, and Church House, which was originally the Abbot's Lodge and is now utilised as offices and a restaurant and is listed at Grade I. On the south-eastern edge of the Green, No.s 17, 18 and 19 are listed at Grade II, while 20 College Green is Grade II*.

Miller's Green is entered through the Inner Gateway, between Community House and No. 7, Miller's Green. The gateway dates from the 14th century and formed the gatehouse to the monastic service court. It is a Grade I listed building, while No. 7 is listed at Grade II. Other buildings on Miller's Green include the Deanery, listed at Grade II*, the Old Mill House, No. 2 Miller's Green, listed at Grade II, and No.s 3, 4A, 4B, 5 and 6, all listed at Grade II.

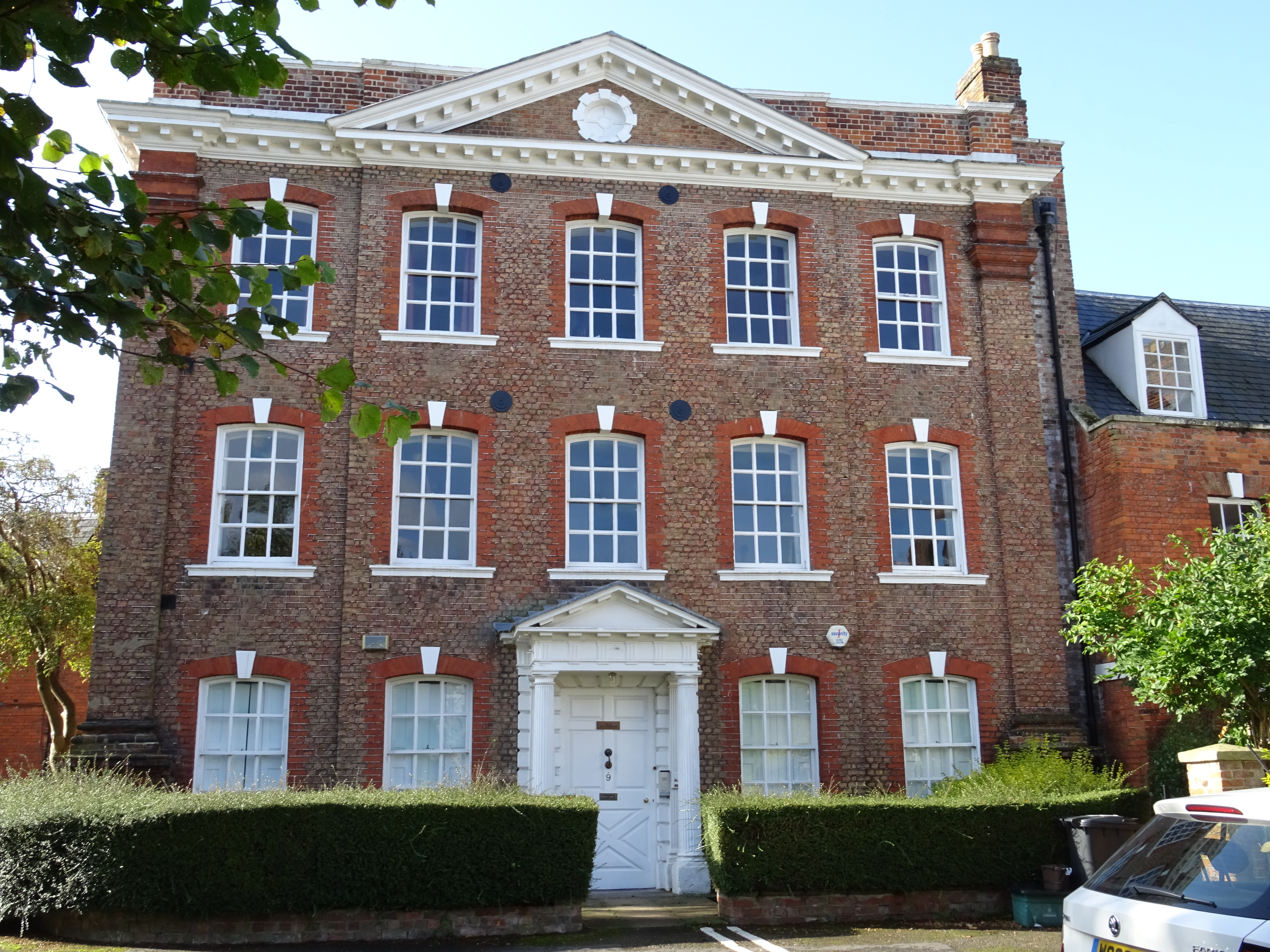
No. 9, College Green

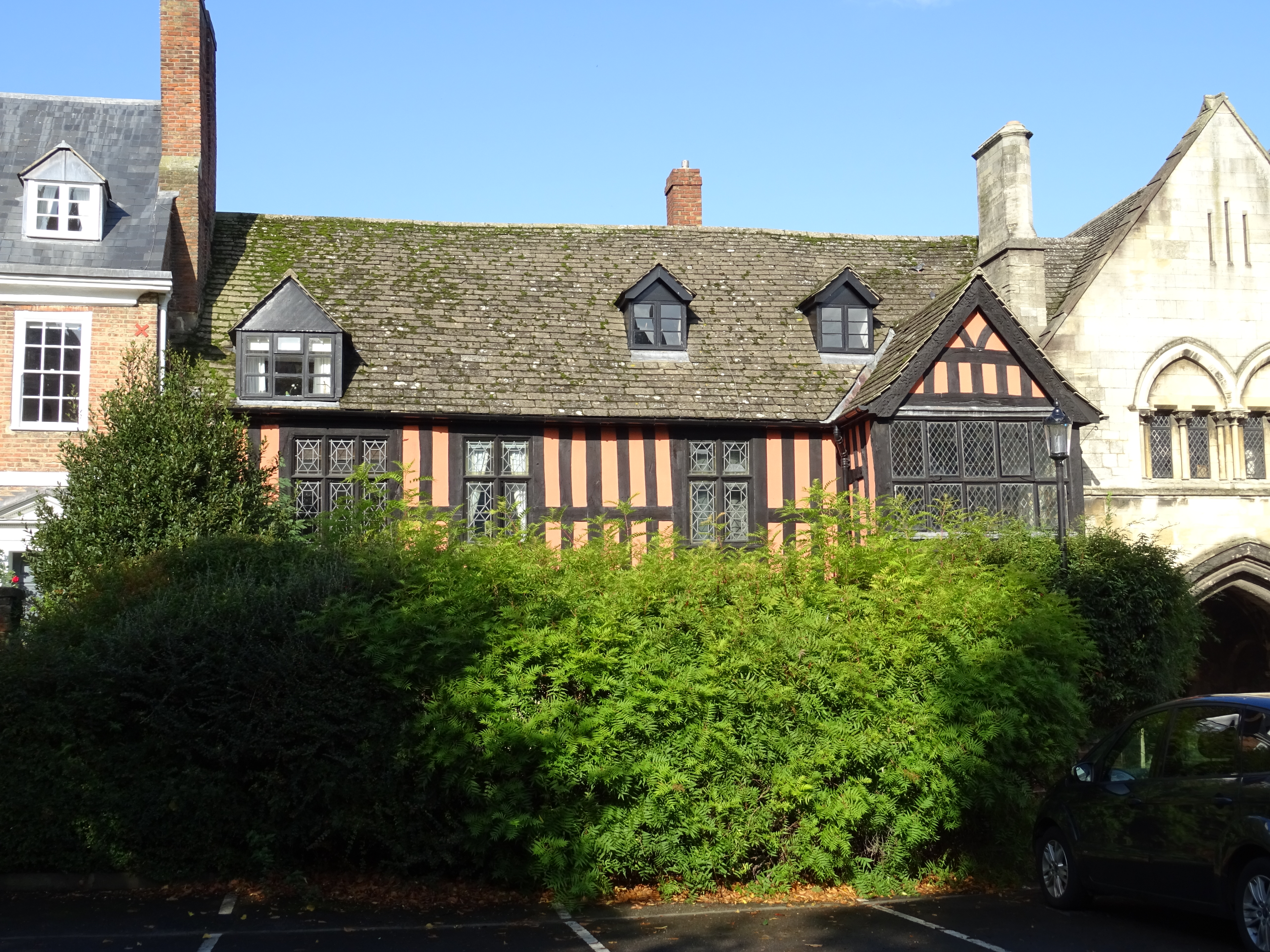
No. 14, College Green

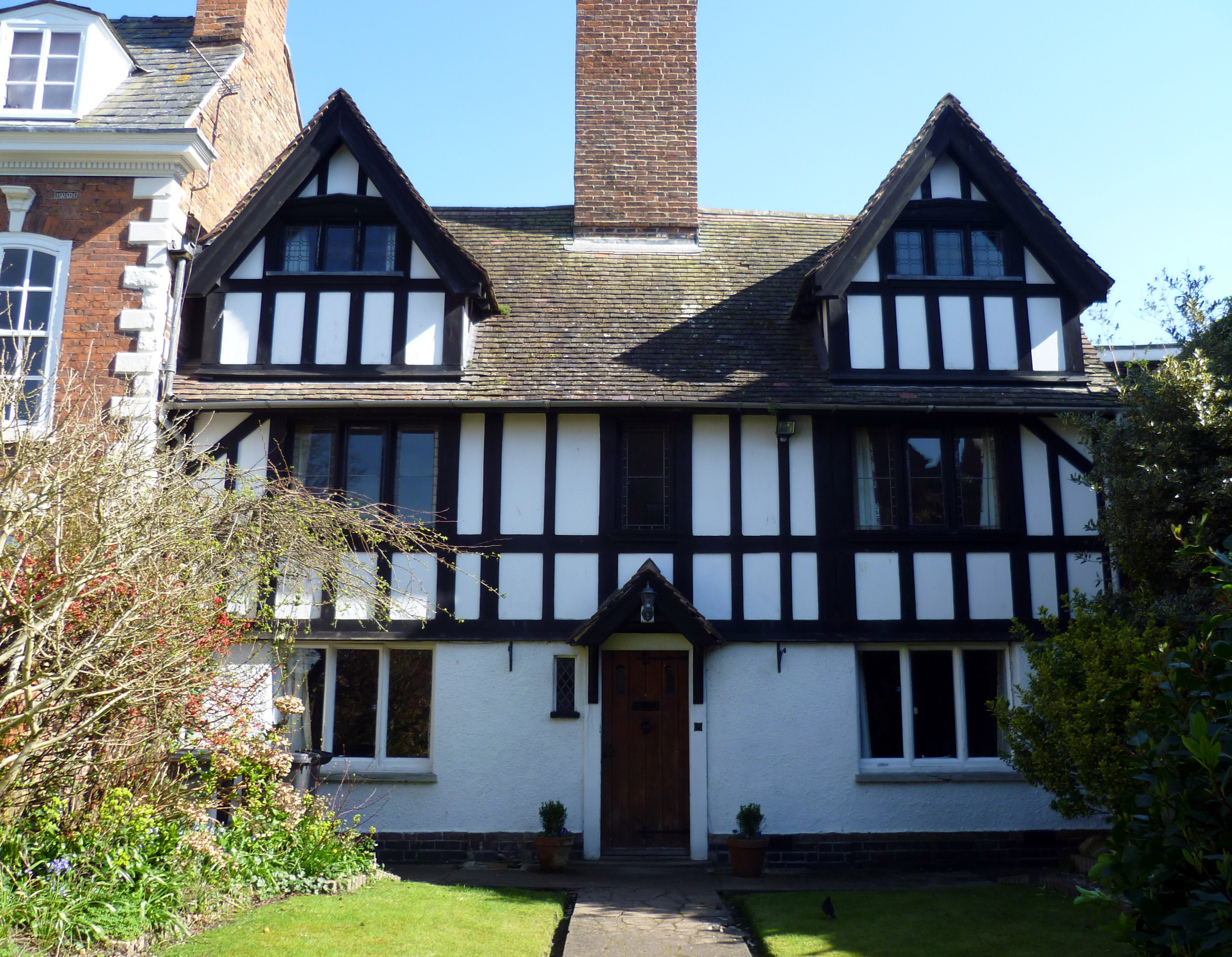
No. 20, College Green

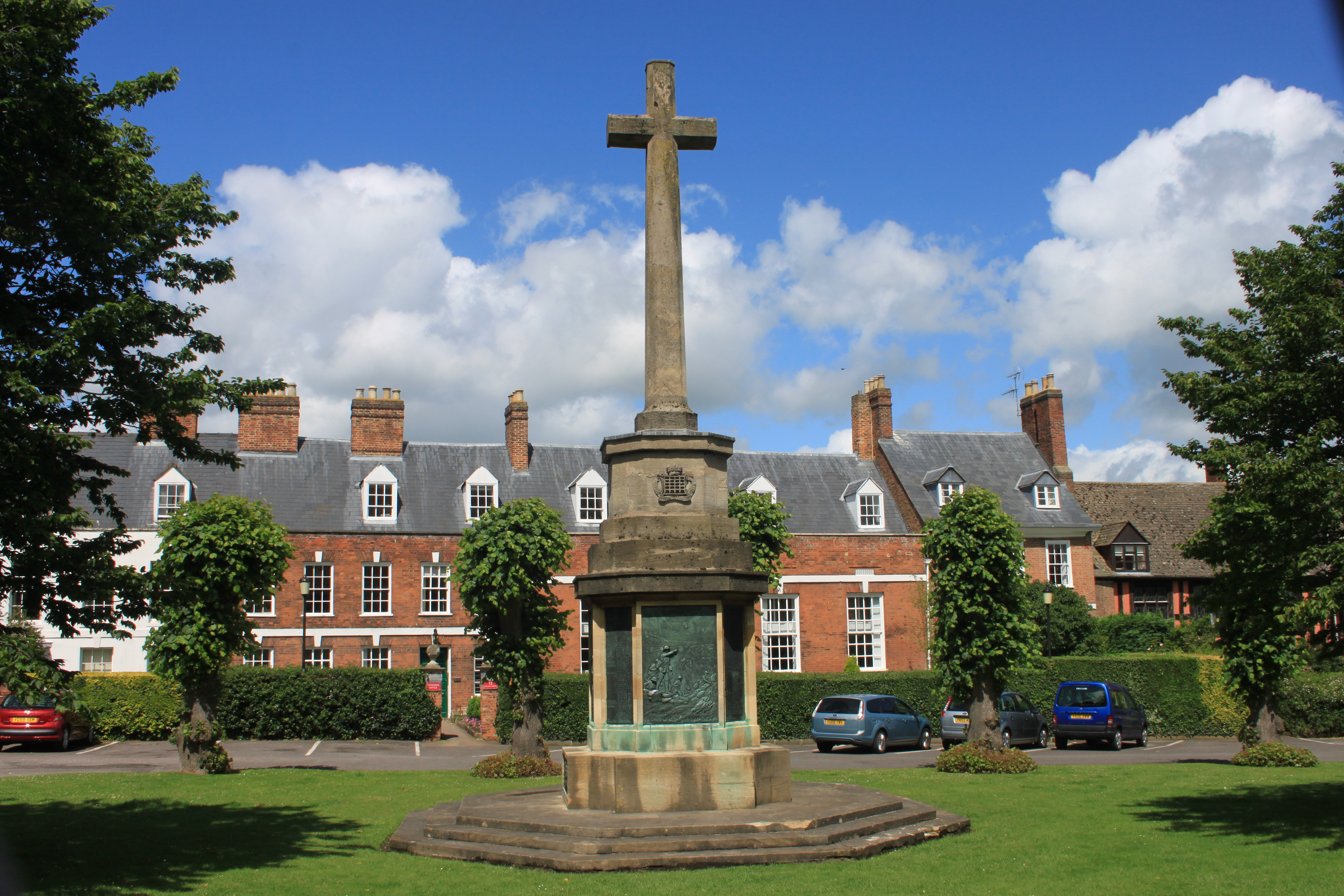
The war memorial on College Green

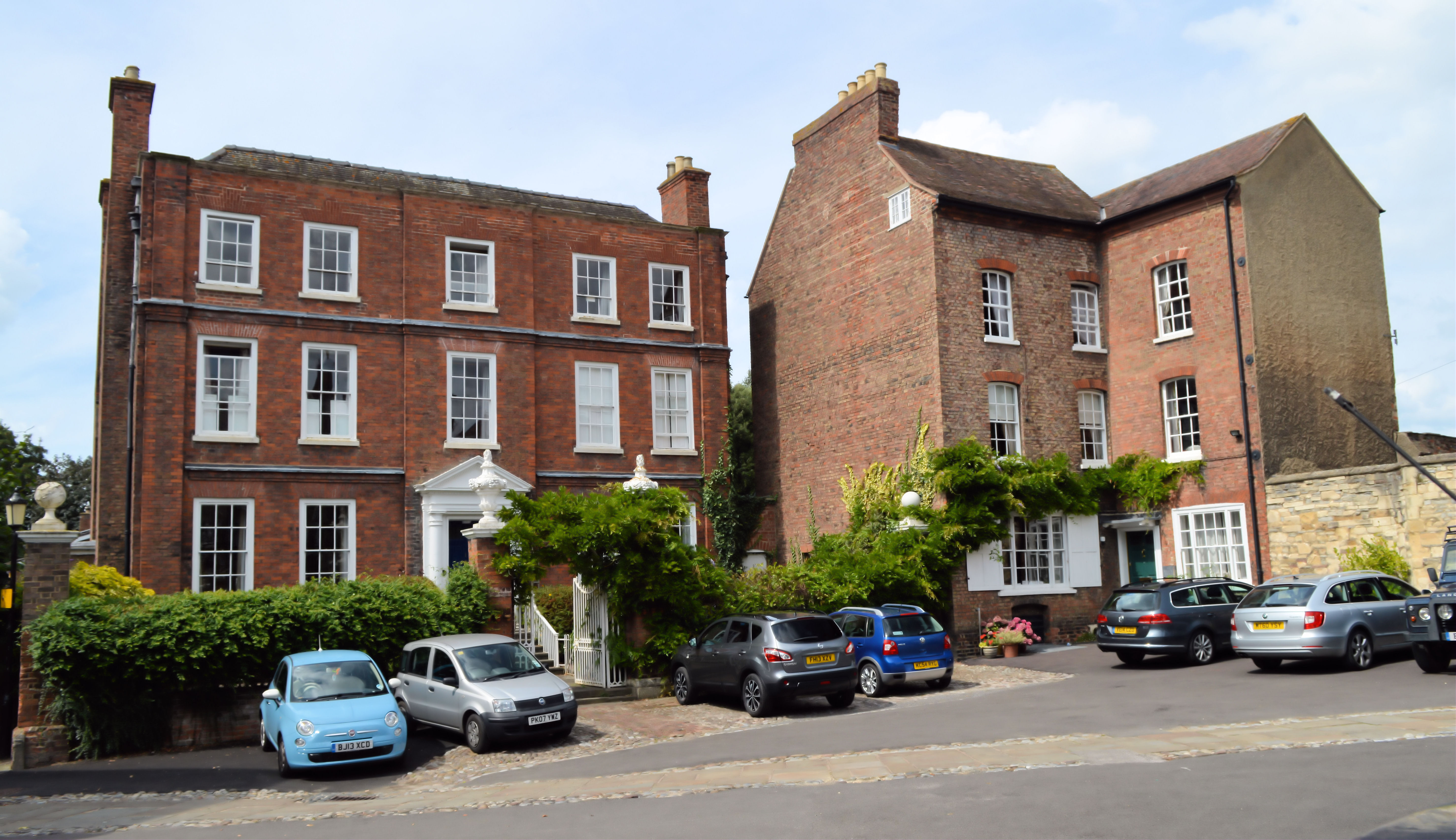
The Deanery, No. 1, Miller's Green

== Dean and chapter ==
- Dean – Andrew Zihni (since 23 April 2023)
- Canon Precentor & Director of Congregational Development – Craig Huxley-Jones (since 23 July 2023 installation)
- Canon Chancellor – Celia Thomson (since 15 March 2003 installation; previously Pastor)
- City Centre Rector (Diocesan Canon) – Nikki Arthy (since 2009; Rector of St Mary de Lode, St Mary de Crypt and Hempsted)
- Archdeacon of Gloucester (Diocesan Canon) – Hilary Dawson (since 27 January 2019 collation)

== Music ==
=== Choir ===
In medieval times, daily worship was sung by boys and monks from the abbey. The cathedral's current choir was established by King Henry VIII in 1539, and at present is composed of 18 boy and 20 girl choristers, as well as 12 adult singers. The choristers attend the King's School, which was also founded by Henry VIII. The choir sings regularly during term time and at major religious festivals such as Christmas or Easter. It also takes part in concerts and has been featured in choral evensong on BBC Radio 3.

=== Organ ===
The cathedral's first organ was built by Thomas Harris in 1666. Its original case remains complete, the only such surviving example from the 17th century in England. The pipes displayed on the front of the case are still functional. Over the following four centuries many of the major English organ builders have made contributions to the organ, including modifications in 1847 and a complete rebuild in 1888–1889 by Henry "Father" Willis. Harrison & Harrison undertook a further reconstruction in 1920.

In 1971 Hill, Norman and Beard, working with the cathedral's organist John Sanders, and a consultant, Ralph Downes, completely redesigned the instrument, which was again overhauled in 1999 by Nicholson & Co. In 2010 Nicholson's added a Trompette Harmonique solo reed. From 2022 the organ was out of commission and was replaced with samples of Hereford Cathedral organ played via a keyboard. The cathedral contracted Nicholsons to reconstruct the instrument by June 2026, in time for that year's Three Choirs' Festival. The reconstructed organ was formally dedicated during a Festal Evensong on 5 July 2026, attended by the Duke and Duchess of Gloucester.

=== Organists ===
In 1582, Robert Lichfield is recorded as the organist of Gloucester Cathedral. Notable among the organists are composers and choral conductors of the Three Choirs Festival, Herbert Brewer, Herbert Sumsion and John Sanders. Herbert Howells, who was a pupil of Brewer, composed a Magnificat and Nunc dimittis for Gloucester Cathedral

=== Three Choirs Festival ===
An annual musical festival, the Three Choirs Festival, is hosted by turns in this cathedral and those of Worcester and Hereford in rotation.

== Clock and bells ==
=== Clock ===
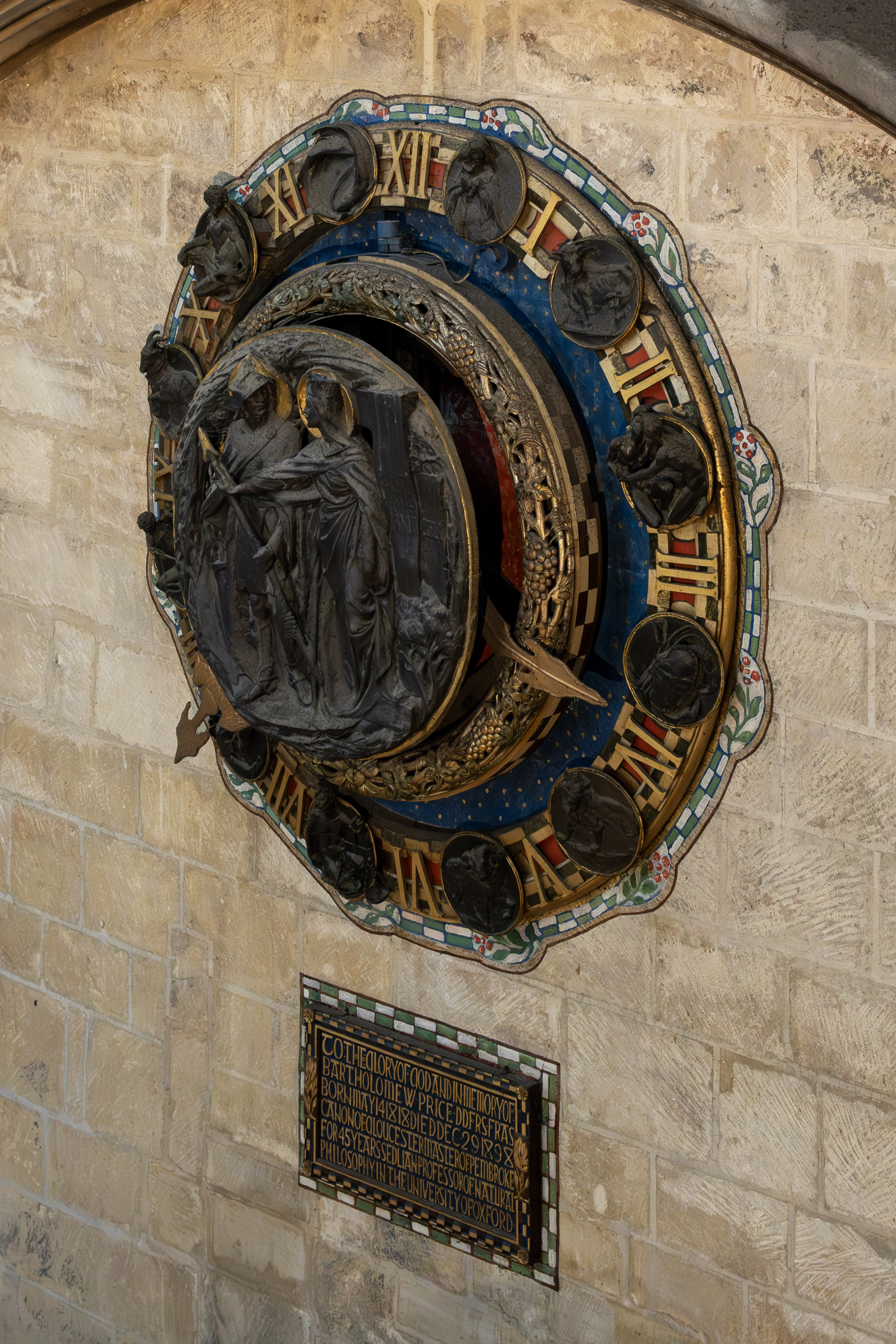
The clock face by Henry Wilson

The cathedral's clock, bells and the chimes are referred to in a repair agreement of 1525. The present clock, installed in 1898, is by Dent and Co, who built the clock for Big Ben. There is no external dial, but there is a Art Nouveau clock face in the north transept, dating from 1903, designed by Henry Wilson.

=== Bells ===
The bells were rehung and augmented in 1978 to give a ring of twelve. The two oldest bells date from before 1420, so they are older than the present tower. The bells are rung 'full circle' by the cathedral's band of ringers for the weekly practice session. In addition, there is Great Peter, the largest medieval bell in Britain, weighing a fraction under three tons. Great Peter is the hour bell and can also be heard ringing before the main services.

== Burials and monuments ==
Gloucester Cathedral has a large collection of funerary monuments from the Middle Ages to the present. Notable people buried at Gloucester Cathedral include:

- Osric, King of the Hwicce
- Robert Curthose, eldest son of William the Conqueror
- Edward II of England, 6th Plantagenet King of England (1307–1327)
- John Wakeman, last Abbot of Tewkesbury and first Bishop of Gloucester (1541–1550)
- James Brooks, Bishop of Gloucester (1554–1558)
- Richard Cheyney, Bishop of Gloucester (1562–1579)
- John Bullingham, Bishop of Gloucester (1581–1598)
- Members of the Hyett family from the 17th and 18th centuries, whose remains were discovered accidentally in November 2015
- William Nicholson, Bishop of Gloucester (1660–1672)
- Martin Benson, Bishop of Gloucester (1734–1752)
- Richard Pate, landowner and MP for Gloucester
- Thomas Machen, mercer who was mayor of Gloucester three times and one time MP for the city
- Dorothea Beale, Principal of the Cheltenham Ladies' College, educational reformer and suffragist
- Ralph Bigland, Garter Principal King of Arms (1712–1784)
- Miles Nightingall, British army general (1768–1829)
- Albert Mansbridge, pioneer of adult education in Britain (1876–1952)
- John Yates, Bishop of Gloucester (1925–2008)
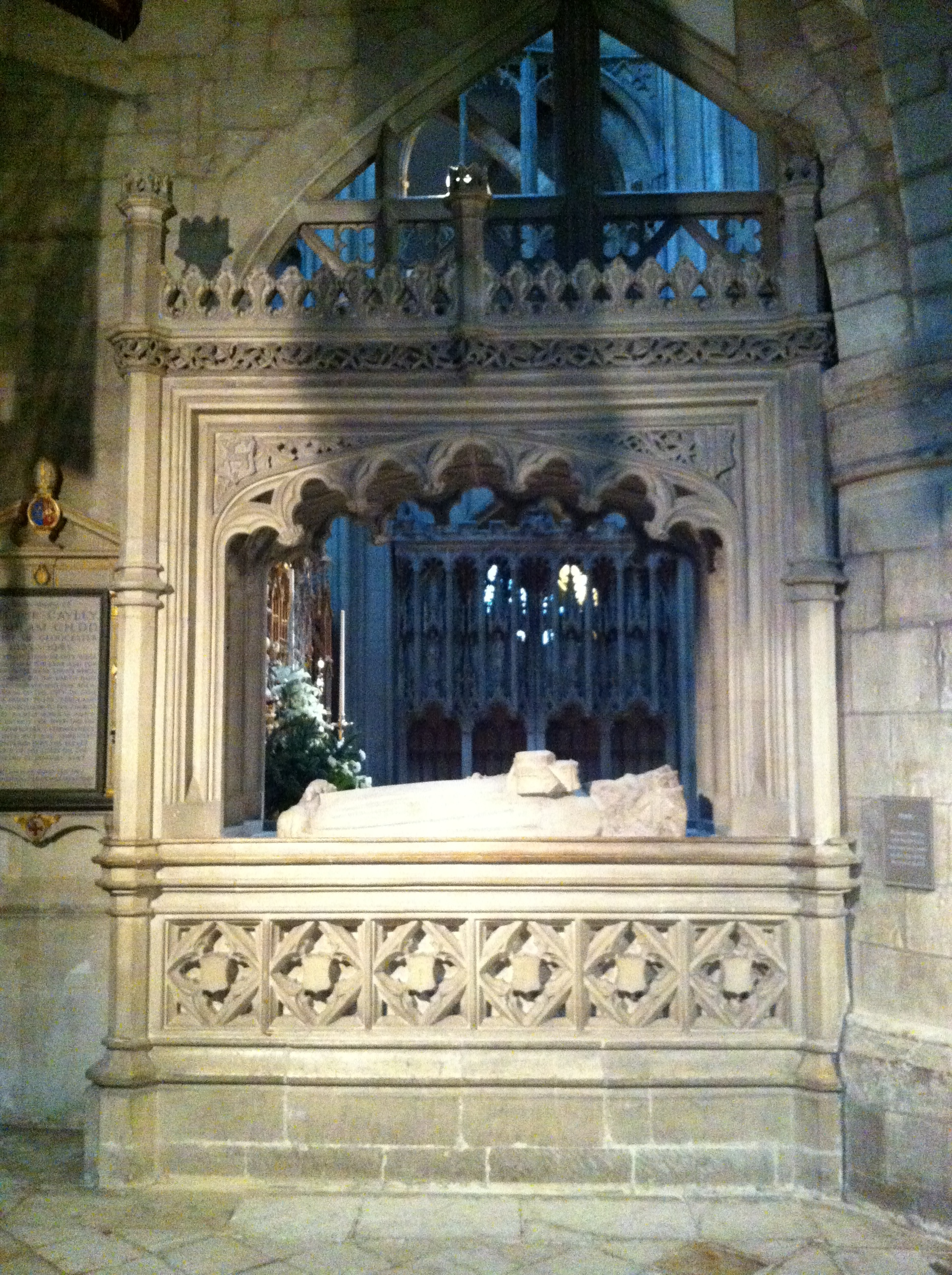
Tomb of Osric, King of the Hwicce

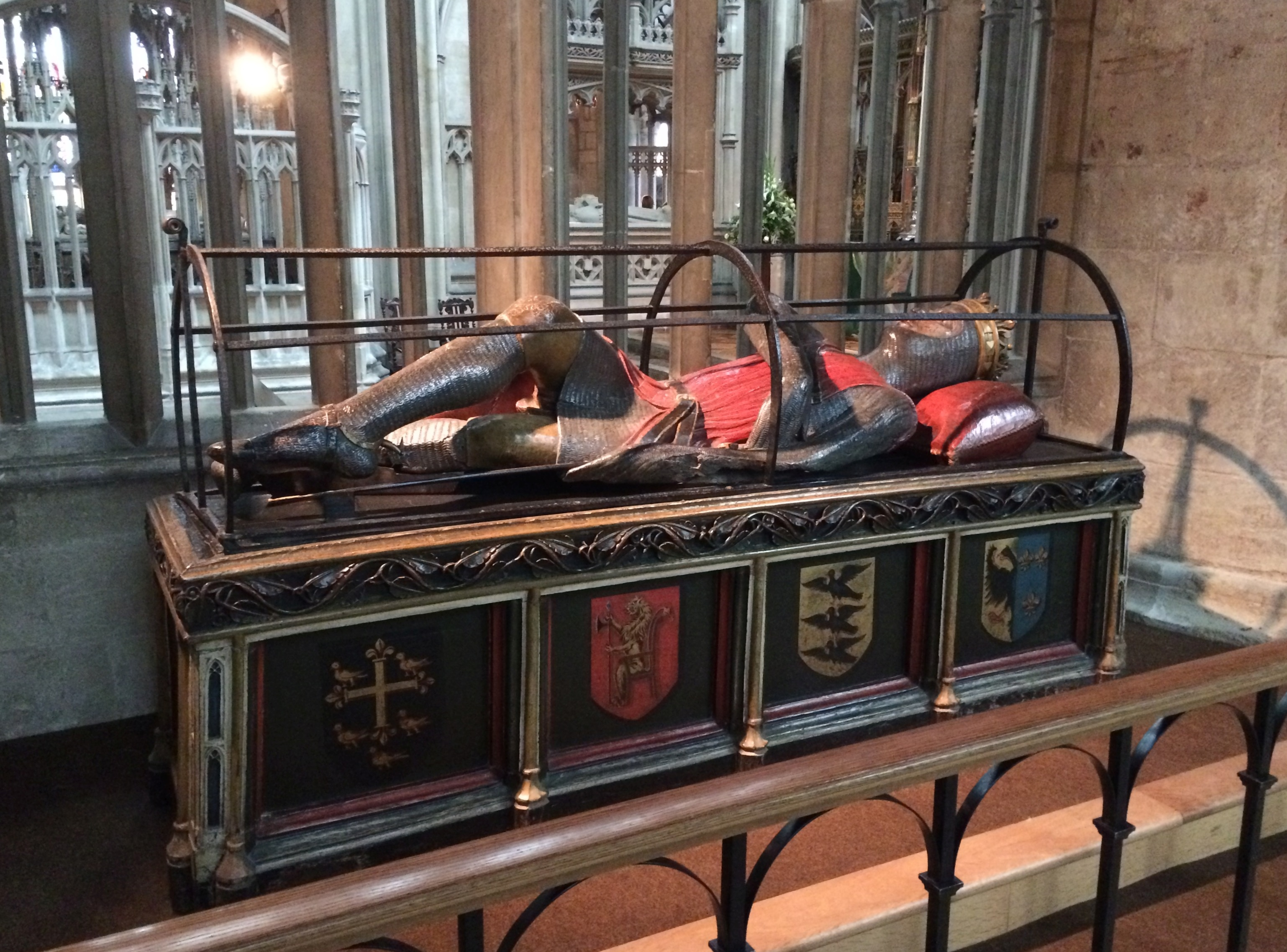
Tomb of Robert Curthose

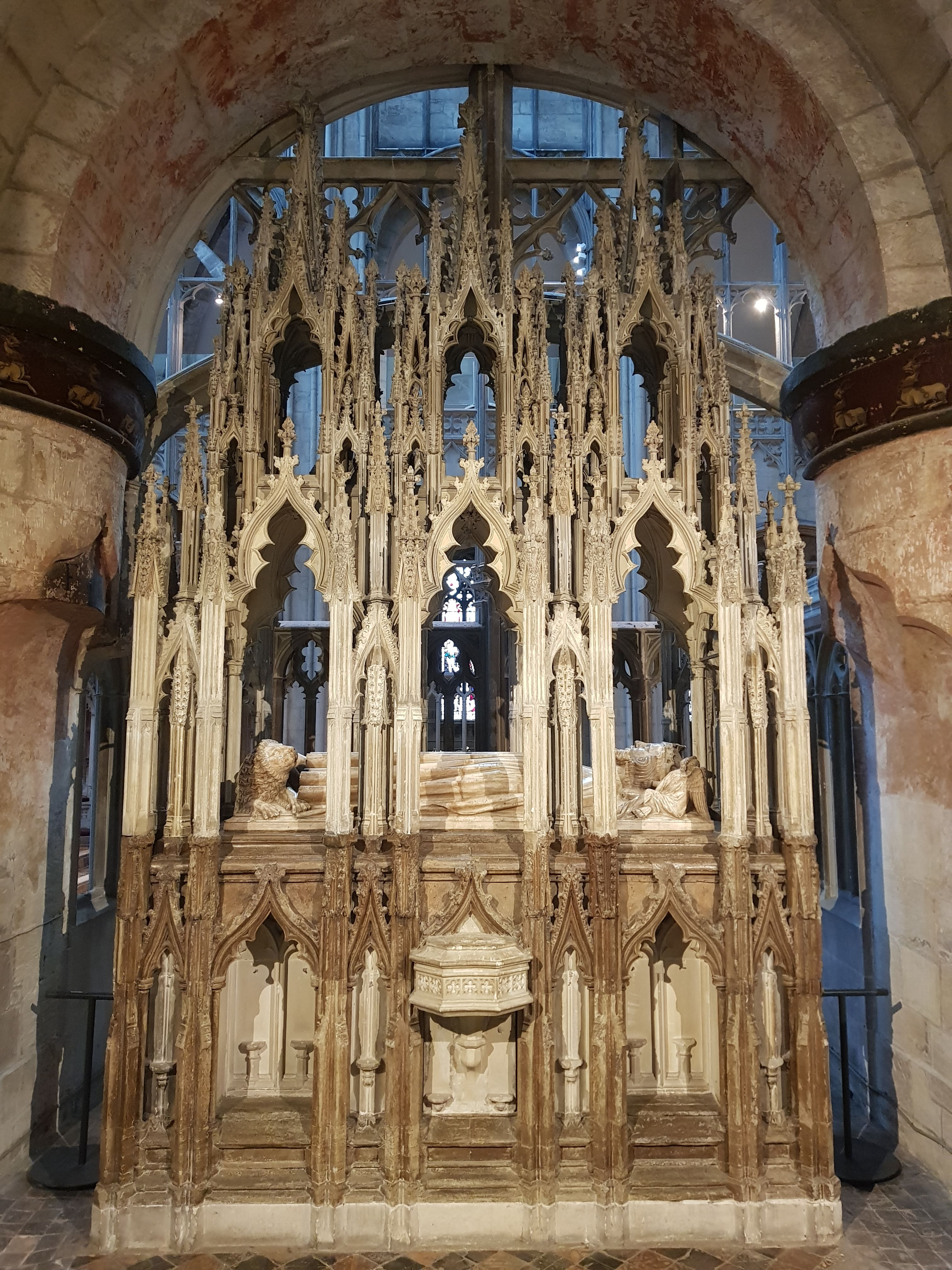
Tomb of Edward II of England

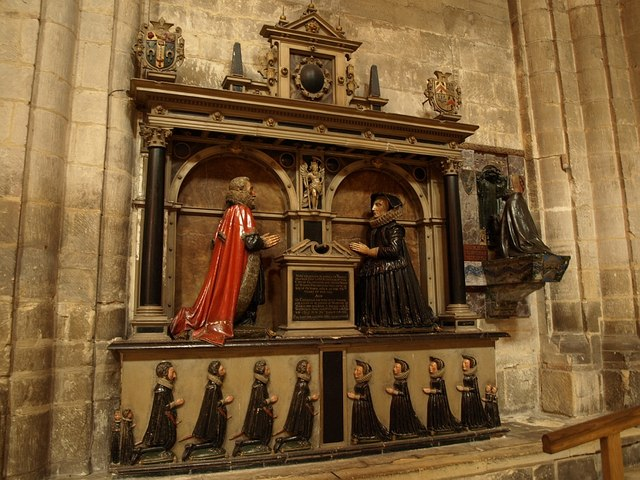
Tomb of Thomas Machen

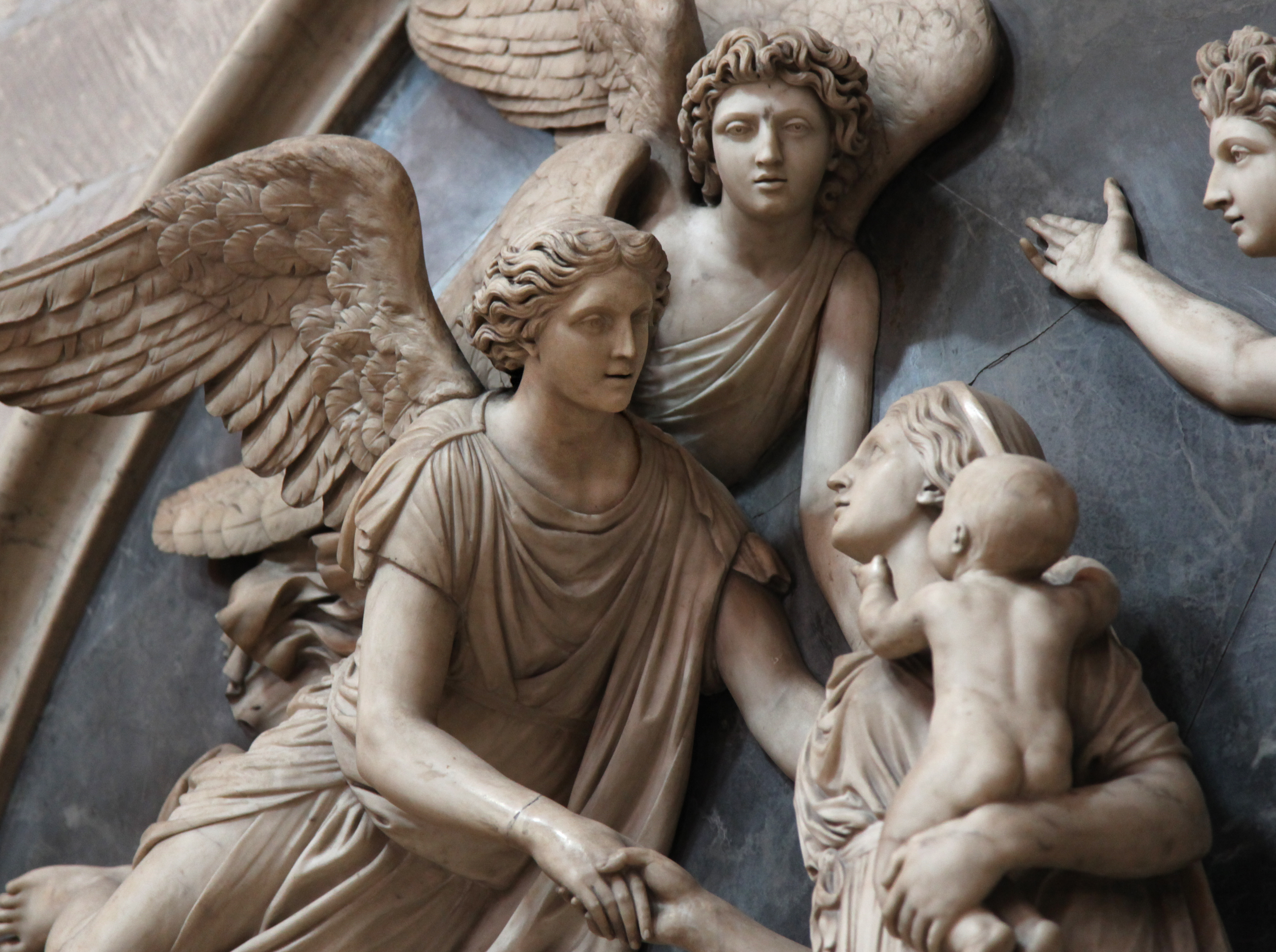
Detail of monument to Sarah Morley by John Flaxman

== Film and television location ==
The cathedral has been used as a filming location for movies and for TV including: the first, second and sixth Harry Potter movies; the Doctor Who episodes The Next Doctor and the Fugitive of the Judoon; The Hollow Crown; Wolf Hall; the Sherlock special The Abominable Bride; Mary Queen of Scots; and all three of The Cousins' War adaptations – The White Queen, The White Princess and The Spanish Princess.

== Academic use ==
Degree ceremonies of the University of Gloucestershire and the University of the West of England (through Hartpury College) both take place at the cathedral. The cathedral is also used during school term-time as the venue for assemblies by The King's School, Gloucester, and for events by the Denmark Road High School, Crypt Grammar School, Sir Thomas Rich's School for boys and Ribston Hall High School.

== Timeline ==
- 678–679 A small religious community was founded in Anglo-Saxon times by Osric of the Hwicce. His sister Kyneburga was the first abbess.
- 1017 Secular priests expelled; the monastery given to Benedictine monks.
- 1072 Serlo, the first Norman abbot, appointed to the almost defunct monastery by William I.
- 1089 Foundation stone of the new abbey church laid by Robert de Losinga, Bishop of Hereford.
- 1100 Consecration of St Peter's Abbey.
- 1216 First coronation of Henry III.
- 1327 Burial of Edward II.
- 1331 Perpendicular remodelling of the quire.
- 1373 Great Cloister begun by Abbot Horton; completed by Abbott Frouster (1381–1412)
- 1420 West End rebuilt by Abbot Morwent.
- 1450 Tower begun by Abbot Sebrok; completed by Robert Tully.
- 1470 Lady Chapel rebuilt by Abbot Hanley; completed by Abbot Farley (1472–1498).
- 1540 Dissolution of the abbey.
- 1541 Refounded as a cathedral by Henry VIII.
- 1616–1621 William Laud holds the office of Dean of Gloucester
- 1649–1660 Abolition of dean and chapter, reinstated by Charles II
- 1666 Installation of Great Organ by Thomas Harris
- 1735–1752 Martin Benson, Bishop of Gloucester, carried out major repairs and alterations to the cathedral.
- 1847–1873 Beginning of extensive Victorian restoration work (Frederick S. Waller and George Gilbert Scott, architects).
- 1953 Major appeal for the restoration of the cathedral; renewed
- 1968 Cathedral largely re-roofed and other major work completed.
- 1989 900th anniversary appeal.
- 1994 Restoration of tower completed.
- 2000 Celebration of the novecentennial of the consecration of St Peter's Abbey.
- 2015 Installation of Rachel Treweek as the Church of England's first female diocesan bishop.

== See also ==
- Architecture of the medieval cathedrals of England
- Gloucester Candlestick
- Gothic cathedrals and churches
- List of Gothic Cathedrals in Europe
- List of cathedrals in the United Kingdom
- List of tallest structures built before the 20th century
- Christopher Whall works in Gloucester Cathedral

== Sources ==
- Bailey, James (2000). The Parish Church of St Mary and St David at Kilpeck. Hereford: Berrington Press. OCLC 1033796044.
- Cannon, Jon (2011). Cathedral: The Great English Cathedrals and the World that made them. London: Constable & Robinson. ISBN 978-1-849-01679-7.
- Gransden, Antonia (2013). Historical Writing in England: 550 – 1307 and 1307 to the Early Sixteenth Century. London: Routledge. ISBN 978-1-136-19021-6.
- Harvey, John (1978). The Perpendicular Style. London: Batsford Books. OCLC 819786894.
- Heighway, Carolyn (2003). Gloucester Cathedral and Precinct: an archaeological assessment (PDF). Bristol & Gloucestershire Archaeological Society.
- Herbert, N.M. (1988). "Gloucester: The cathedral and close". A History of the County of Gloucester. Victoria County History. Vol. 4. Oxford: Oxford University Press for the Institute of Historical Research. OCLC 1103213964.
- Knowles, David; Brooke, C. N. L.; London, Vera C. M. (1972). The Heads of Religious Houses: England and Wales 940–1216. Cambridge: Cambridge University Press. ISBN 0-521-08367-2.
- Newman, John (1995). Glamorgan. The Buildings of Wales. London, UK: Penguin. ISBN 0140710566.
- Page, William (1907). "The Abbey of St Peter at Gloucester". A History of the County of Gloucester. Victoria County History. Vol. 2. London: Archibald Constable and Company. OCLC 927032134.
- Pevsner, Nikolaus; Metcalf, Priscilla (2005). The West and Midlands. The Cathedrals of England. Cambridge: Folio Society. OCLC 71807455.
- Shenton, Caroline (2021). National Treasures: Saving the Nation's Art in World War II. London: John Murray. ISBN 978-1-529-38743-8.
- Stamp, Gavin (2015). Gothic For The Steam Age: An Illustrated Biography of George Gilbert Scott. London: Aurum Press. ISBN 978-1-78131-124-0. OCLC 980892536.
- Verey, David; Brooks, Alan (2002a) [1970]. Gloucestershire 2: The Vale and the Forest of Dean. The Buildings of England. New Haven, US and London: Yale University Press. ISBN 978-0-300-09733-7. OCLC 249275468.
- Verey, David; Brooks, Alan (2002b). Gloucester: The cathedral church of the Holy and Indivisible Trinity. New Haven, US and London: Yale University Press. ISBN 978-0-300-11018-0.
- Welander, David (1991). The history, art, and architecture of Gloucester Cathedral. Stroud, Gloucestershire: Sutton Publishing. OCLC 755233912.
