= 20 College Green =

House in Gloucester, England

Coordinates: 51°52′00″N 2°14′48″W

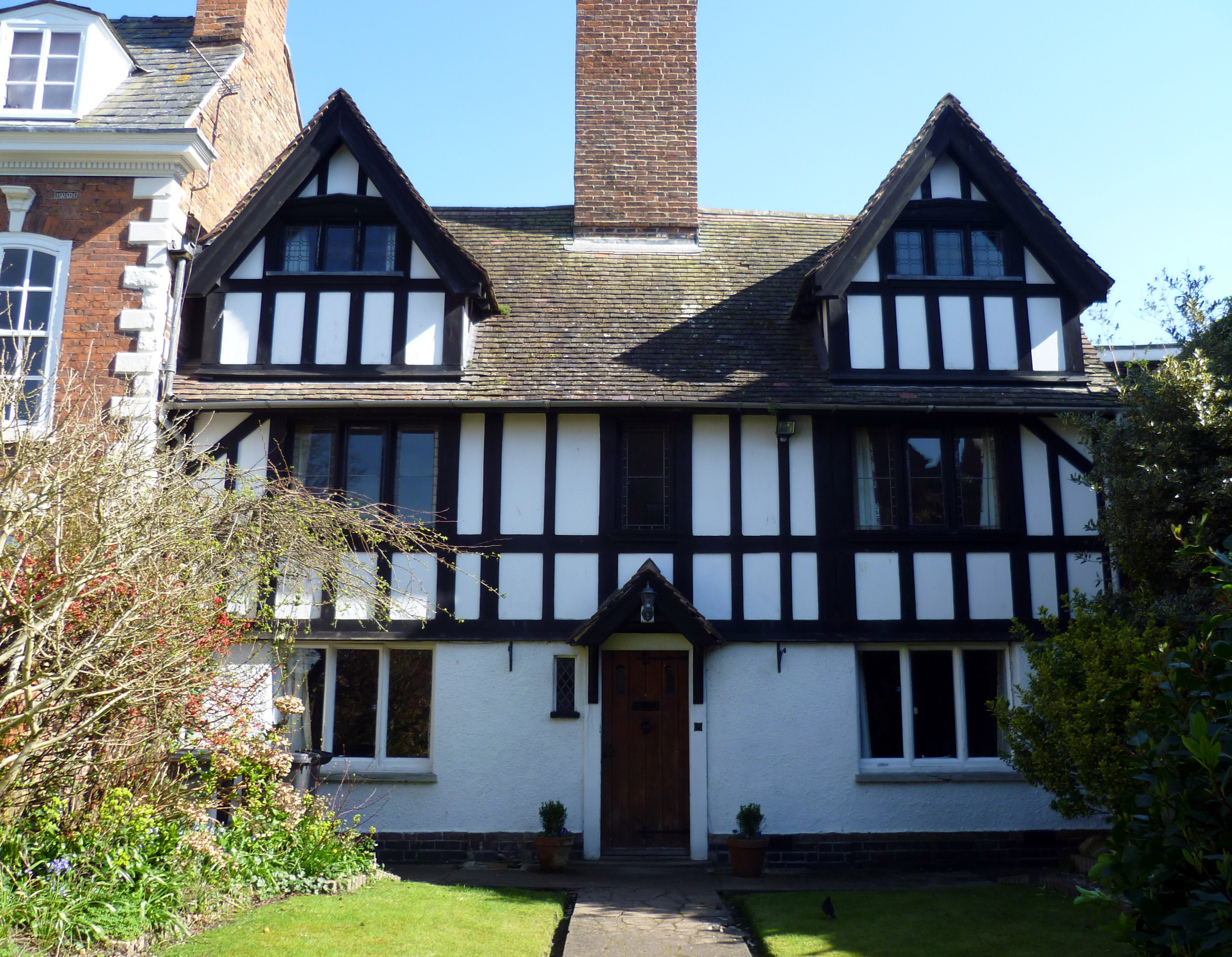
20 College Green

20 College Green is an early 17th-century house located in Gloucester. Together with the associated part of the Abbey Precinct Wall the house is a Grade II* listed building with Historic England. It is located in the precincts of Gloucester Cathedral. The house was begun in 1596, but was altered and added to in the 18th century. The house incorporates the 12th century precinct wall of St Peter's Abbey as well as another wall that lay between the former monk's cemetery to the east and the lay cemetery to the west. 20 College Green was listed as a Grade II* listed building on 12 March 1973. Its residents have included the musicians Herbert Sumsion and John Sanders.

== History ==
Up until 1768, the precincts of Gloucester Cathedral were divided in two; the area to the east of this wall was known as the Upper College Churchyard, while the area to the west was known as the Lower College Churchyard. The building where 20 College Green stands now was the first to be built in the Upper College Churchyard. The site was let from 1595, when it was leased to one John Brewster, a gentleman. Early reports described it as part of the churchyard but

latelye inclosed paled about and separated from thother parte of the said churchyarde lyinge neare unto the over gate...and now used as a garden by the said John Brewster.

Brewster's land evidently caused some consternation. At the 1613 visitation, when asked whether anyone had encroached or put a garden on any area of the churchyard where burials had formerly taken place, the reply was that there were now two enclosures of such nature,

one made by Mr. Bruister nowe in the occupation of Steeve Cooke six lugge of ground, thother by William Elbridge about 4 lugge, now in the occupation of Mr. Loe & John Elbridge.
