= Thomas Frewen =

Thomas Frewen may refer to:

- Thomas Frewen (physician) (1704–1791), English physician from Sussex
- Thomas Frewen (MP) (1630–1702), MP for Rye

== See also ==
- Frewen (disambiguation)
