= Frewen =

Frewen may refer to:

== People ==
- Accepted Frewen (1588–1664), priest in the Church of England and Archbishop of York from 1660 to 1664
- Alexandra Frewen (born 1934), British public servant
- Charles Hay Frewen (1813–1878), known until 1837 as Charles Hay Frewen-Turner, an English land-owner and Conservative Party politician
- Clare Consuelo Frewen (1885–1970), British sculptor and writer
- John Frewen (divine) (1558–1628), English Puritan divine.
- John Frewen (Admiral Sir John Byng Frewen GCB) (1911–1975), Commander-in-Chief Naval Home Command in the Royal Navy
- Moreton Frewen (1853–1924), Anglo-Irish writer on monetary reform who served briefly as a Member of Parliament.
- Thomas Frewen (physician) (1704–1791), English physician from Sussex
- Thomas Frewen (MP) (1630–1702), MP for Rye 1679–89, 1694–98
