= Bill Jennings =

Bill or Billy Jennings may refer to:

- Bill Jennings (Australian footballer) (1879–1943), Australian rules footballer
- Bill Jennings (ice hockey) (1917–1999), American ice hockey player
- Bill Jennings (American football) (1918–2002), head coach of the Nebraska Cornhuskers, 1957–1961
- Bill Jennings (footballer, born 1920) (1920–1969), British footballer with Ipswich Town, Northampton Town and Rochdale
- Bill Jennings (baseball) (1925–2010), Major League Baseball shortstop
- Billy Jennings (Welsh footballer) (1893–1968), Bolton Wanderers and Wales international footballer
- Billy Jennings (born 1952), English footballer with Watford, West Ham United and others
- Bill Jennings (guitarist) (1919–1978), jazz guitarist

== See also ==
- William Jennings (disambiguation)
