= Henry Gee (priest) =

British clergyman (1858–1938)

The Very Rev'd Professor Henry Gee FSA

Vice-Chancellor of the University of Durham
- In office 1914–1916
- Preceded by: Sir George Hare Philipson
- Succeeded by: Sir William Henry Hadow

Master of University College, Durham
- In office 1902–1919
- Preceded by: Alfred Plummer
- Succeeded by: The Rev'd Prof Henry Ellershaw

Dean of Gloucester
- In office 1918–1938
- Preceded by: Henry Donald Maurice Spence
- Succeeded by: Harold Costley-White

Personal details
- Born: 1858
- Died: 1938 (aged 79–80)
- Education: Exeter College, Oxford
- Profession: Academic and Vice-Chancellor

Henry Gee, FSA (1858–1938) was an Anglican dean in the first half of the 20th century.

He was educated at Exeter College, Oxford and ordained in 1877. In 1880 he was appointed by Dr. Boultbee as junior tutor at the London College of Divinity, where he later advanced to tutor and vice-principal, until he resigned in January 1900 to become Principal of Bishop's College, Ripon. From May 1902 he was Master of University College, Durham and in 1910 was appointed Professor of Church History at Durham University, a post he held for 8 years up to his appointment as Dean of Gloucester. He died on 23 December 1938.

== Notes ==
Academic offices
Preceded by Sir George Hare Philipson	Vice-Chancellor & Warden of the University of Durham; 1914 - 1916	Succeeded by Sir William Henry Hadow
Preceded by Alfred Plummer	Master of University College, Durham; 1902–1919	Succeeded by Henry Ellershaw
Church of England titles
Preceded by Henry Donald Maurice Spence	Dean of Gloucester; 1918–1938	Succeeded by Harold Costley-White
Professional and academic associations
Preceded by Alan Percy, 8th Duke of Northumberland	President of the Surtees Society; 1931–38	Succeeded by Hensley Henson
Preceded by William Brown	Secretary of the Surtees Society; 1916–20	Succeeded by Alexander Hamilton Thompson
