= William Jennings =

William Jennings may refer to:

- William Jennings (mayor) (1823–1886), mayor of Salt Lake City, Utah, USA
- William M. Jennings (1920–1981), one time owner of the New York Rangers of the National Hockey League; the League annually gives out an award in his honour
- William Nicholson Jennings (1860–1946), photographer in Philadelphia
- W. Pat Jennings (1919–1994), Representative in the United States Congress from Virginia
- William Sherman Jennings (1863–1920), governor of Florida, United States
- William Thomas Jennings (1854–1923), New Zealand politician
- William Jennings (priest) (died 1565), Dean of Gloucester, 1541–1565
- William Dale Jennings (1917–2000), American author of The Cowboys, The Ronin, and The Sinking of the Sarah Diamond
- Sir William Ivor Jennings (1903–1965), British lawyer and academic
- William Jennens (1701–1798), "William the Miser", "William the Rich", 'the richest commoner in England' who died intestate

== See also ==
- William Jennings Bryan (1860–1925), orator and three times the Democratic Party's candidate for the US presidency
- Bill Jennings (disambiguation)
