= Pulpit Commentary =

1880–1919 Biblical commentary

The Pulpit Commentary is a homiletic commentary on the Bible first published between 1880 and 1919 and created under the direction of Rev. Joseph S. Exell and Henry Donald Maurice Spence-Jones. It consists of 23 volumes with 22,000 pages and 95,000 entries, and was written over a 30-year period with 100 contributors.

Rev. Joseph S. Exell M.A. served as the editor of Clerical World, The Homiletical Quarterly and the Monthly Interpreter. Exell was also the editor for several other large commentary sets like The Men of the Bible, The Preacher's Homiletic Library and The Biblical Illustrator. Henry Donald Maurice Spence-Jones was the Vicar and Rural Dean of St. Pancras, London and the principal of Gloucester Theological College.
