= John Frewen (disambiguation) =

John Frewen was a Royal Navy officer.

John Frewen may also refer to:

- John Frewen (divine) (1558–1628), English divine
- John Frewen (general), Australian Army general
- John Frewen-Turner (1755–1829), born John Frewen, English landowner and politician
