= Higgons =

Higgons is a surname. Notable people with the surname include:

- Bevil Higgons (1670–1735), English historian and poet
- Thomas Higgons (1624–1691), English diplomat and politician
- Theophilus Higgons (1578–1659), English divine

== See also ==
- Higgins (surname)
