= David C. C. Watson =

Indian creationist

- Born: 20 February 1920; Bharatpur, India
- Died: 12 January 2004 (aged 83); Worthing
- Occupation: Teacher
- Writing career
- Period: 1975–1996
- Genres: Christian theology, apologetics

David Charles Cuningham Watson (20 February 1920 – 12 January 2004) was an English teacher, author and creationist, born in Bharatpur, India.

== Biography ==
Watson graduated from the University of Cambridge with First class honours in Classics, winning the Carus Greek Testament Prize in 1947. He was later a Senior Scholar at Trinity College.

He then served as a missionary in India, teaching at a Christian school near Madras (now Chennai). There he came into contact with Hannington Enoch, Professor of Zoology at Presidency College, whose articles Watson cited as influential on his own creationist efforts. In 1951 he was a founding member and the magazine editor of the Inter Collegiate Evangelical Union (ICEU) of Madras, which was one of a number of movements that later formed the Union of Evangelical Students of India.

In 1975 and 1976 he published The Great Brain Robbery and Myths and Miracles, which were later translated into other languages including German, Spanish and Finnish.

In 1976 Watson, who was a member of the Evolution Protest Movement, lost his job teaching religious education at a state school in the United Kingdom. Although creationists publicly reported that this dismissal was for refusing "to teach that Genesis is myth" and rallied to his support, they privately intimated opinions about his inability to control pupils classroom behaviour and failure to follow the prescribed syllabus. The Times Educational Supplement reported that students interrupted his class with shouts of "rubbish".

As of 1980 he was Director of the Institute for Creation Research's Midwest Center in Illinois, but in September of that year Walt Brown assumed that role. In 1997, the journal of another UK creationist group published an article that included Watson's views in a table comparing the opinions of "leading creationists".

He died in Worthing in 2004.

== Works ==
=== Creationism ===
- The Great Brain Robbery: Creation or Evolution? (1975) 105pp. ISBN 978-0-85479-960-2
  [Reprint (Dillon's book, 1989) 140pp. ISBN 978-0-9514538-0-3
- Myths and Miracles: A New Approach to Genesis 1–11 (1976) 120pp. ISBN 978-0-85479-601-4
  [Reprint (Creation Science Foundation, 1991) ASIN B000WO6FOY].
- Ten articles in Origins, journal of the Biblical Creation Society (1989 to 1995)

In translation:

- Die grosse Gehirnwäsche: Schöpfung oder Evolution? (1977) Schulte, ISBN 3-87739-545-7.
- Weltschöpfung und Urgeschichte aus wissenschaftlicher Sicht (1987) Schulte, ISBN 3-87739-319-5.
- El gran fraude intelectual (1981) Clie, ISBN 84-7228-589-8.
- Mitos y milagros (1980) Clie, ISBN 84-7228-555-3.
- Elämän synty: sattumaa vai suunnittelua? (1979) Ristin voitto, ISBN 951-605-587-7.

=== General evangelical theology ===
- Fact or Fantasy: Authenticity of the Gospels (1980) 142pp. ISBN 978-0-85479-022-7
- The End is Nigh (Creation Science Movement, Pamphlet 296, 1994)
- Gospel According to Matthew: Commentary (Welsh Riviera Press, 1996), ISBN 978-1-899654-26-0
