= Carus Greek Testament Prizes =

- Awarded for: A paper on translating and interpreting a passage from the Greek New Testament.
- Description: Annual prizes for undergraduate and graduate students at Cambridge University.
- Country: United Kingdom
- Presented by: University of Cambridge
- Status: Inactive (not awarded in recent years due to a lack of candidates)
- Established: 1853
- First award: 1854

The Carus Greek Testament Prizes are two annual prizes (one for undergraduates, one for graduate students) awarded at Cambridge University in England. Candidates are given a passage in Greek from the New Testament and asked to both translate and interpret it; a board of examiners then judges the papers. A student can only win each prize once.

Prize money was originally donated by friends of a Rev. William Carus, a Fellow of Trinity College, and was accepted by the university in 1853. It was later increased by a donation from Carus himself and by an anonymous donor in 1894. The prizes were first awarded in 1854.

The prize is still announced annually, but has not been awarded in recent years due to a lack of candidates.

== Notable prize-winners ==
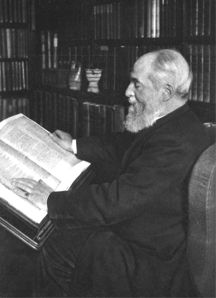
Henry Barclay Swete, undergraduate winner (shared) in 1854

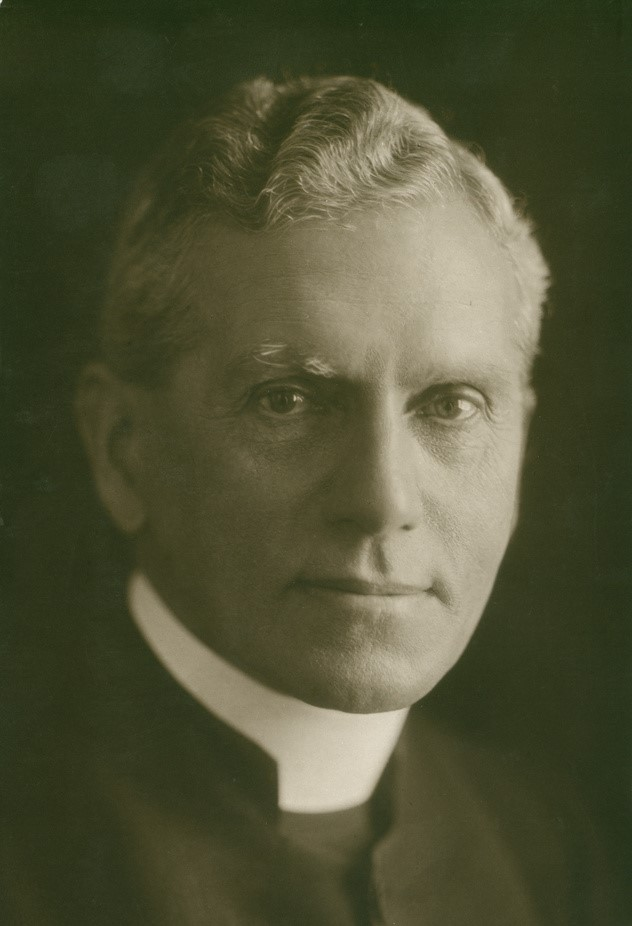
Arthur Nutter Thomas, undergraduate winner in 1893

- Arthur Ayres Ellis (the first graduate prize winner, 1854)
- Henry Barclay Swete (undergraduate - 1855 (shared))
- William Hagger Barlow (graduate - 1858)
- Herbert Mortimer Luckock (graduate - 1860)
- Handley Moule (undergraduate - 1862 (shared))
- Henry Donald Maurice Spence (undergraduate - 1862 (shared); graduate - 1866)
- Henry Melvill Gwatkin (undergraduate - 1865; graduate - 1868)
- Alexander Francis Kirkpatrick (undergraduate - 1870)
- James Welldon (undergraduate - 1873)
- Frederic Wallis (undergraduate - 1874; graduate - 1877)
- Herbert Edward Ryle (undergraduate - 1875; graduate - 1879)
- Rodney Eden (1878)
- William Edmund Smyth (graduate - 1880)
- John Reginald Harmer (1881)
- M. R. James (undergraduate - 1882)
- Francis Burkitt (undergraduate - 1886)
- Arthur Nutter Thomas (undergraduate - 1893)
- Harold Herbert Williams (undergraduate - 1901)
- Campbell West-Watson (graduate - 1901)
- Stephen Neill (undergraduate - 1919; graduate - 1923
- David C. C. Watson (1947)
