= Gilbert Thurlow =

Alfred Gilbert Goddard Thurlow (6 April 1911 – 24 April 1991) was an Anglican dean and author in the last third of the 20th century.

He was educated at Selwyn College, Cambridge and ordained after a period of study at Ripon College Cuddesdon in 1935. He was Curate of All Saints, Wokingham then Precentor of Norwich Cathedral until 1955. He then held Norfolk incumbencies in Norwich and Great Yarmouth before becoming a Canon Residentiary at Norwich Cathedral. He was Dean of Gloucester from 1972 to 1982. He spent his retirement in Chichester.

== Notes ==
Church of England titles
Preceded by Seiriol John Arthur Evans	Dean of Gloucester; 1972–1982	Succeeded by Kenneth Neal Jennings
