= Daniel Newcombe =

English Anglican dean

Daniel Newcombe was an Anglican dean in the mid 18th century.

Newcombe was educated at Emmanuel College, Cambridge. He was ordained in 1702 and held livings at Caldecote, Thornhaugh and Penmark. He was an Honorary Chaplain to the King from 1725 until 1730; and Dean of Gloucester from 1730 until his death on 3 March 1758.

Church of England titles
Preceded by Peter Allix	Dean of Gloucester; 1730–1758	Succeeded by Josiah Tucker
