= Griffith Lewis =

Griffith Lewis (d. 1607) a Church of England minister.

Lewis was presented to the sixth prebend of Westminster by Elizabeth I in 1577 and became one of her chaplains in ordinary around 1584. He was the rector of Kingsland, Herefordshire.

In 1594 Lewis was installed as Dean of Gloucester. In 1596 he unsuccessfully appealed to Robert Cecil to be appointed bishop of Chester. During his tenure he snubbed the authority of successive bishops by failing to appear at their visitations of the cathedral clergy. He wrote his will in February 1607, requesting that he be buried in one of the cathedrals of Gloucester Worcester or Hereford. He was interred at Hereford Cathedral on 6 June 1607.

Church of England titles
Preceded by Anthony Rudd	Dean of Gloucester; 1594–1607	Succeeded by Thomas Morton
