= Seiriol Evans =

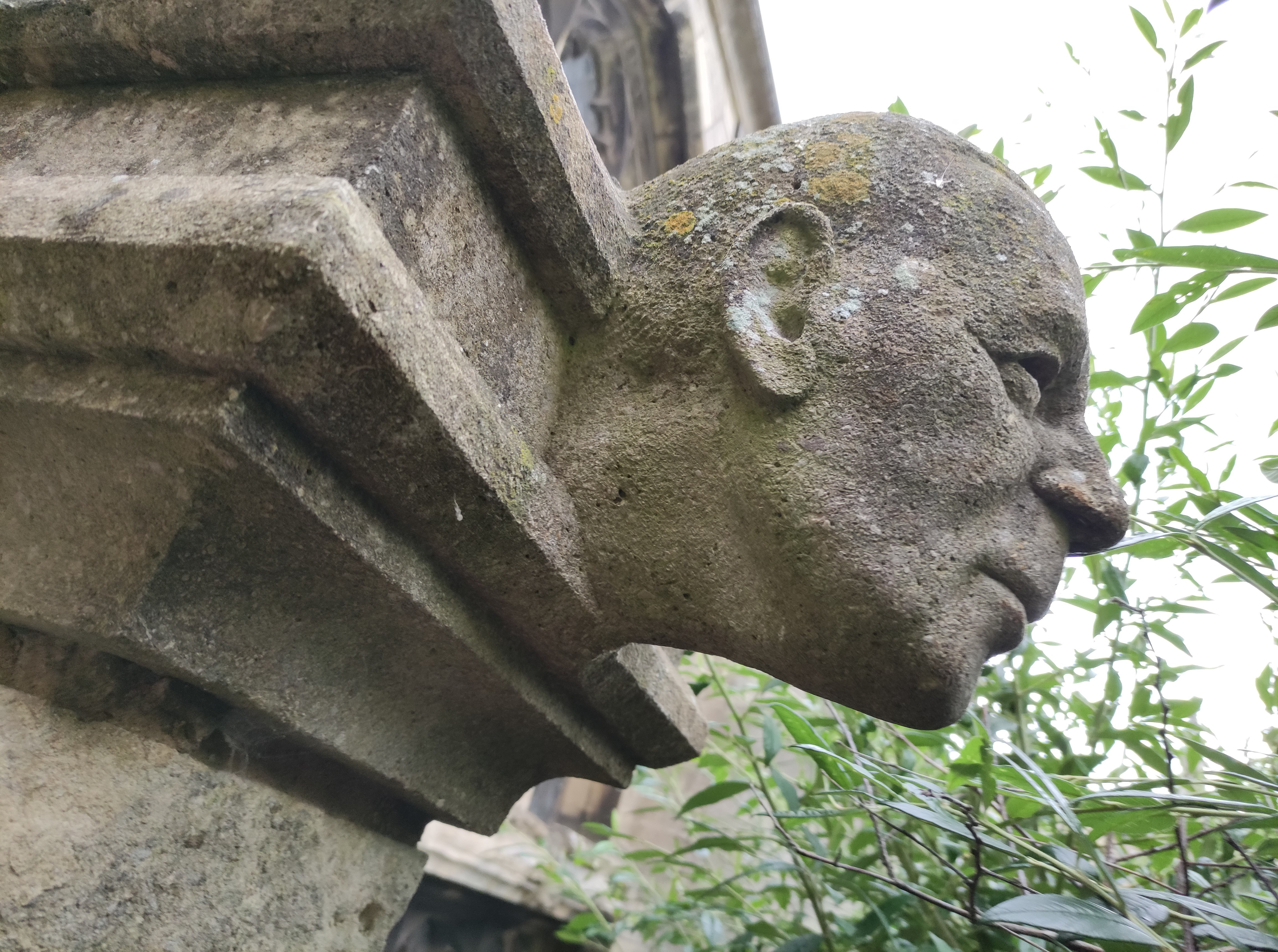
Stone carving of the face of Seiriol Evans, which is located on the west wall of Gloucester Gathedral's Gath, behind some bushes.

Seiriol John Arthur Evans CBE (22 November 1894 – 29 June 1984) was an Anglican dean and author in the third quarter of the 20th century.

== Biography ==
Evans was the son of Rev. John Arthur Evans, sometime Rector of Sible Hedingham, Essex. He was educated at King's College School, Cambridge, then the King's School, Worcester before returning to King's College, Cambridge as an undergraduate. He was then ordained after a period of study at Salisbury Theological College in 1921. He was Curate of St Mary and All Saints' Church, Kidderminster then Sacrist of Gloucester Cathedral. After this he was Precentor of Ely Cathedral from 1923 to 1929 and then Rector of Upwell. During World War II he was a Chaplain in the RNVR. From 1945 to 1953 he was Archdeacon of Wisbech when he was appointed Dean of Gloucester- a post he held for 19 years. He spent his retirement in Fulbourn.

There is a stone effigy dedicated to him at Gloucester Cathedral.

== Notes ==
Church of England titles
Preceded by Harold Costley-White	Dean of Gloucester; 1953–1972	Succeeded by Alfred Gilbert Goddard Thurlow
