= Harold Herbert Williams =

Sir Harold Herbert Williams FBA FSA JP (25 July 1880 – 24 October 1964) was an English scholar, priest, lawyer, politician, bibliophile, and expert on the works of Jonathan Swift.

Williams was born in Tokyo, the son of Rev. James Williams, an Anglican missionary in Japan, and Mary Ann Hodson Grindrod. He returned to England to attend Liverpool College and Christ's College, Cambridge (1904). He won the undergraduate Carus Prize for Greek Testament scholarship in 1901. Ordained in 1904, he held several posts before resigning as a priest in 1909.

Williams served as a captain in the Royal Army Service Corps 1914–19. In 1920, he was called to the Bar (Inner Temple). He resided in Buntingford, Hertfordshire and served as a Justice of the Peace and chairman of the Hertfordshire County council (1947–50).

Williams wrote Book Clubs & Printing Societies of Great Britain & Ireland (1929) and served as president of the Bibliographical Society 1938–44.

He was knighted in the 1951 King's Birthday Honours List for his work in local government and bibliography. He was elected to the British Academy (1944) and the Society of Antiquaries of London (1948).

Wiliams wrote a number of books on literary subjects (Two Centuries of the English Novel, Outlines of Modern English Literature, 1890-1914).

Williams specialty was the work of Jonathan Swift. He wrote Dean Swift's Library (1932), edited an edition of The Poems of Jonathan Swift (1937, revised 1958), held the Sandars Readership in Bibliography at Cambridge in 1950 on the subject of "New Light on the Publication of Gulliver's Travels" and published three volumes of Swift's Letters in his lifetime (with two more published posthumously). Williams bequeathed his library of rare books relating to Swift to Cambridge University and a version of Jervas's first portrait of Swift to the National Portrait Gallery.
