= Kenneth Jennings (priest) =

Kenneth Neal Jennings (8 November 1930 – 14 December 2007) was Dean of Gloucester from 1983 until 1996.

Jennings was educated at Hertford Grammar School, Corpus Christi College, Cambridge, and Ripon College Cuddesdon. After a curacy at Holy Trinity, Ramsgate, he joined the staff of Bishop’s College, Calcutta. Later he was Vice Principal of his old theological college from (1967 to 1973) then Vicar of Hitchin, a post he held until his appointment to the Deanery.

== Notes ==
Church of England titles
Preceded by Gilbert Thurlow	Dean of Gloucester; 1983–1996	Succeeded by Nicholas Bury
