= Simon Luttichuys =

Dutch painter

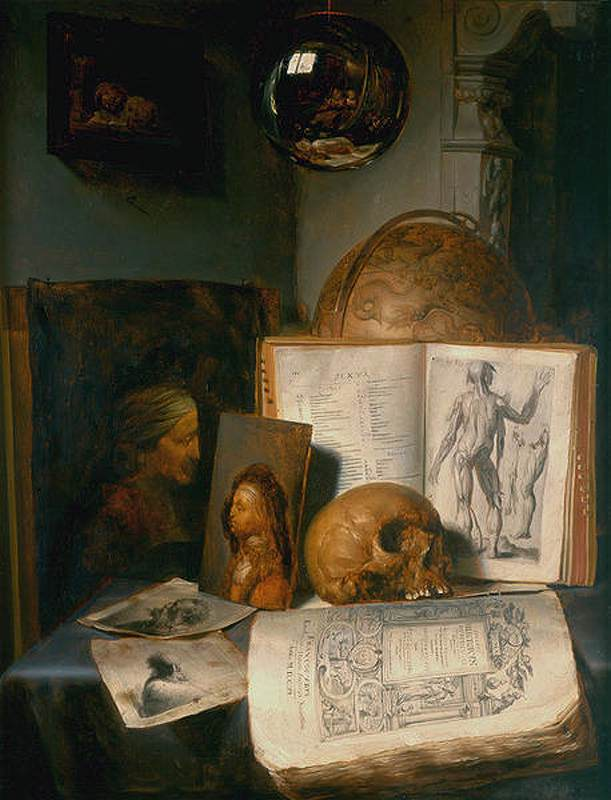
Vanitas still life with skull, books, prints and paintings by Rembrandt and Jan Lievens, with a reflection of the painter at work.

Simon Luttichuys (1610–1661) was a Dutch Golden Age still life painter.

== Biography ==
Luttichuys was born in London. According to RKD, he was probably the same person as Simon Littlehouse who painted a portrait of the bishop Thomas Morton of St. John's College, Cambridge in 1637/1638. His name in Dutch sounds like Littlehouse. He was the brother of the painter Isaack Luttichuys and had moved to Amsterdam by 1649. He married an Englishwoman from Norfolk in Amsterdam in 1655, Anna van Peene uit ' Naerfick in Engelant'. He is known for various forms of still life painting and influenced the painter Willem Kalf. He died in Amsterdam.
