= Nick Holtam =

British Anglican bishop (born 1954)

The Right Reverend Nick Holtam
- Bishop of Salisbury
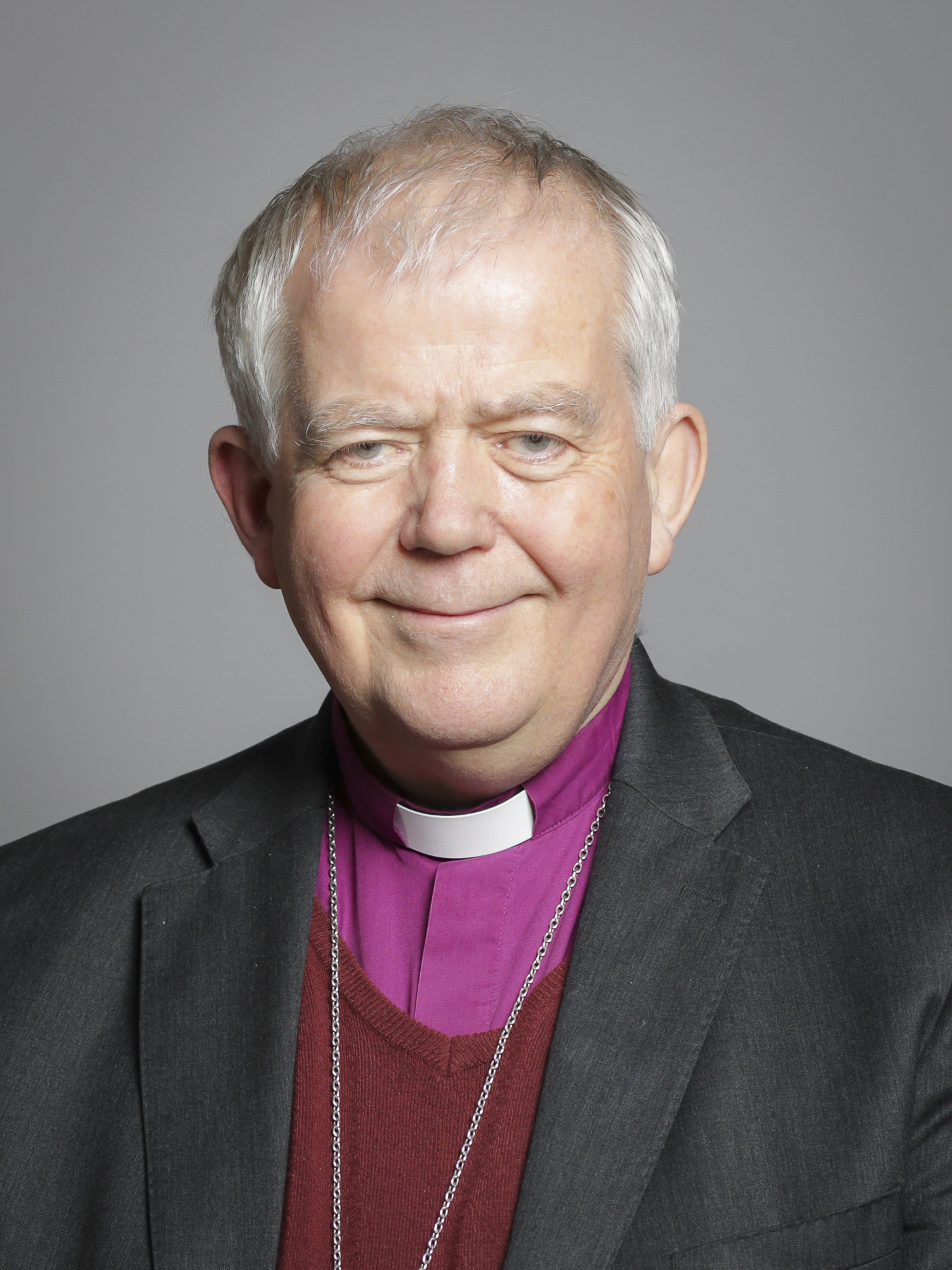
- Official portrait, 2019
- Diocese: Diocese of Salisbury
- In office: 2011–2021
- Predecessor: David Stancliffe
- Successor: Stephen Lake
- Other post: Vicar of St Martin-in-the-Fields (1995–2011)

Orders
- Ordination: 1979 (deacon); 1980 (priest) by Gerald Ellison (deacon); Jim Thompson (priest)
- Consecration: 22 July 2011 by Rowan Williams

Personal details
- Born: 8 August 1954 (age 72)
- Denomination: Anglican
- Residence: South Canonry, Salisbury
- Spouse: Helen Harris
- Children: Four
- Occupation: broadcaster, author
- Education: Collingwood College, Durham; King's College London

Member of the House of Lords
- Lord Spiritual
- Bishop of Salisbury; 9 February 2015 – 3 July 2021

Nicholas Roderick Holtam (born 8 August 1954) is a retired bishop of the Church of England. He served as Bishop of Salisbury from 2011 until his retirement in 2021.

== Early life and education ==
Holtam was born in Launton Oxfordshire and grew up in Enfield and Winchmore Hill in North London. He attended the Latymer School Edmonton before going to Collingwood College, Durham University, where he studied geography. After graduating, he studied for ordination at both King's College, London and Westcott House theological college, Cambridge. He studied part-time externally for an MA in Theology from Durham University for a dissertation on The Churches and the Bomb.

== Ordained ministry ==
=== As a priest ===
Holtam was made deacon at Michaelmas 1979 (30 September), by Gerald Ellison, Bishop of London, at St Paul's Cathedral, and ordained priest the Michaelmas following (28 September 1980), by Jim Thompson, Bishop of Stepney, at St Mary's, Islington. He was an assistant curate at St Dunstan's, Stepney. In 1983, he moved to Lincoln Theological College, where he was a tutor in Christian ethics and mission. In 1988, he became the vicar of The Isle of Dogs.

From 1995 to 2011, Holtam was the vicar of St Martin-in-the-Fields, in the Trafalgar Square area of the Diocese of London, where he initiated and led a £36 million buildings renewal. While in this position, he was a regular broadcaster and published articles and two books, A Room with a View: Ministry with the World at Your Door (SPCK, 2008); The Art of Worship: Paintings, Prayers and Readings for Meditation (National Gallery London with Yale University Press, 2011)..

=== As a bishop ===
On 12 April 2011, it was announced that Holtam had been nominated to become the Bishop of Salisbury. His last service at St Martin-in-the-Fields was on 10 July 2011, his canonical election was confirmed on 21 July and he was consecrated as a bishop on 22 July by Rowan Williams, Archbishop of Canterbury, at St Paul's Cathedral. He was installed at Salisbury Cathedral on 15 October.

Holtam was a trustee of the National Churches Trust (2008–16), and now serves as a Vice President, and chaired the Church of England Ministry Division's Committee for Ministry with and among Deaf and Disabled People (2013–18). He is a vice-president of the Royal School of Church Music and in 2013 was made an Honorary Fellow of the Guild of Church Musicians. From 2014 until June 2021 he was Chair of the C of E's Environmental Working Group and lead bishop for the Environment. From 9 February 2015 until his retirement he was a member of the House of Lords as a Lord Spiritual. He made his maiden speech on 2 June 2015, during the Lords debate on the Queen's Speech.

In February 2021, it was announced that he would step down as Bishop of Salisbury on 3 July 2021, retiring one month short of his 67th birthday. He duly retired on that date.

=== Views ===
In February 2012, Holtam became the first Church of England bishop to support same-sex marriage publicly. In June 2013, Holtam wrote in response to a request from Waheed Alli asking him to clarify his views on same-sex marriage and explain why he differs from the official statements made by the Church of England. Acknowledging that members of the Church of England hold varied views, Justin Welby, Archbishop of Canterbury, said in the House of Lords that this was a "strong and welcome contribution". In 2017, speaking on same-sex marriage, Holtam stated that "the Church will come to see the goodness of supporting people in a fruitful relationship that is permanent, faithful and stable."

In 2022 he wrote a third book, Sleepers Wake: Getting Serious About Climate Change, The Archbishop of York’s Advent Book 2022 (SPCK, 2022).

He is an Hon Assistant Bishop in the Diocese of Chichester, a Trustee of The Auckland Project, a member of the Fabric Advisory Committee of Canterbury Cathedral and is Patron of the Museum of Homelessness.

== Personal life ==
Holtam is married to Helen (née Harris), a mathematics teacher, and they have four adult children.

== Honours ==
In 2005 he was awarded an honorary doctorate by Durham University and made a Fellow of King's College London.

== Styles ==
- The Reverend Nick Holtam (1979–2011)
- The Right Reverend Nick Holtam (2011–present)

Church of England titles
Preceded by David Stancliffe	Bishop of Salisbury; 2011–2021	Succeeded by Stephen Lake
