= Accepted Frewen =

English priest

The Most Reverend Accepted Frewen
- Archbishop of York
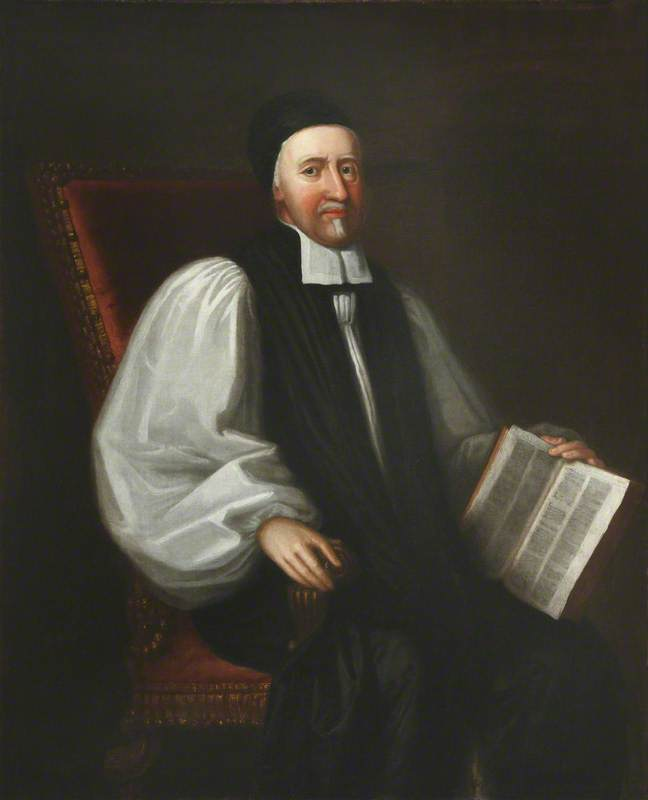
- Diocese: Diocese of York
- Installed: 1660
- Term ended: 1664
- Predecessor: John Williams
- Successor: Richard Sterne
- Other posts: Bishop of Lichfield and Coventry (1644–1646 & 1660); Dean of Gloucester (1631–1644)

Orders
- Consecration: 28 April 1644 by John Williams

Personal details
- Born: 1588 Northiam, Sussex
- Died: 28 March 1664 Bishopthorpe, West Riding of Yorkshire
- Denomination: Anglican
- Parents: John Frewen
- Education: Magdalen College, Oxford

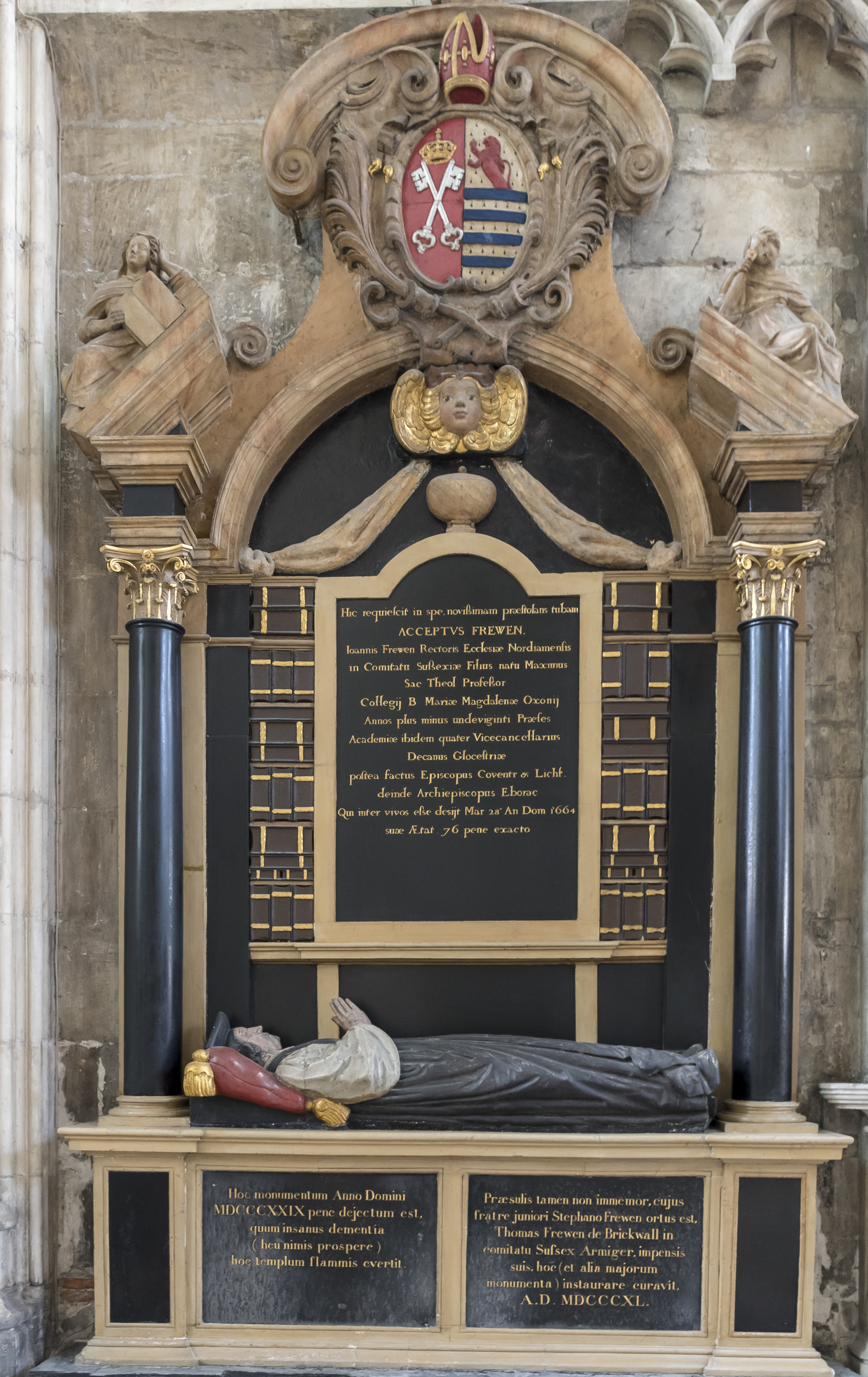
His imposing monument in York Minster

Accepted Frewen (baptised 26 May 1588 – 28 March 1664) was a priest in the Church of England and Archbishop of York from 1660 to 1664.

== Life ==
Frewen was born at Northiam, in east Sussex, the son of John Frewen who was the rector there. The unusual forename is an example of the type of puritan name not uncommon in the area in the late sixteenth century; his brother was called Thankful Frewen. He was educated at Magdalen College, Oxford, where he became a Fellow in 1612. Anthony Wood describes him as being at that time "puritanically enclin'd". In 1617 and 1621 the college allowed him to act as chaplain to Sir John Digby, ambassador in Spain. In Madrid he preached a sermon that pleased Prince Charles, afterwards Charles I, who, on his accession, appointed him one of his chaplains.

In 1625 he became canon of Canterbury Cathedral and Vice-President of Magdalen College, and in the following year he was elected president. He was Vice-Chancellor of Oxford University in 1628 and 1629, and again in 1638 and 1639. In 1631 he was appointed (additionally) Dean of Gloucester. It was mainly by his instrumentality that the University plate was sent to the king at York in 1642.

Two years later (in 1644) he was consecrated Bishop of Lichfield and Coventry, and resigned his presidency (and deanery). He was deprived of his See by Parliament on 9 October 1646, as episcopacy was abolished for the duration of the Commonwealth and the Protectorate. Parliament declared his estates forfeited for treason in 1652, and Cromwell afterwards set a price on his head. The proclamations, however, designated him Stephen Frewen, and he was consequently able to escape into France. At the Restoration in 1660, he was restored to the See of Lichfield and Coventry, reappeared in public, and later the same year was elected Archbishop of York; he took that see by the confirmation of his election on 4 October 1660. In 1661 he acted as chairman of the Savoy conference.

== Arms ==
Coat of arms of Accepted Frewen
Notes When Frewen was serving as a bishop his arms would be displayed impaled with those of the diocese and topped by a mitre. Escutcheon Ermine four bars Azure in chief a lion issuant Gules.

Academic offices
Preceded by William Langton	President of Magdalen College, Oxford; 1626–1644	Succeeded by John Oliver
Preceded by William Juxon	Vice-Chancellor of Oxford University; 1628–1630	Succeeded by William Smyth
Church of England titles
Preceded by George Warburton	Dean of Gloucester; 1631–1644	Succeeded by William Brough
Preceded by Robert Wright	Bishop of Lichfield and Coventry; 1644–1646 & 1660	Succeeded by John Hacket
Preceded by John Williams	Archbishop of York; 1660–1664	Succeeded by Richard Sterne
