= Nicholas Bury =

British clergyman

Nicholas Ayles Stillingfleet Bury (born 8 January 1943) is an Anglican priest who was Dean of Gloucester from 1997 until 2010.

Bury was educated at The King's School, Canterbury and Queens' College, Cambridge, trained for the ministry at Ripon College Cuddesdon (during which time his predecessor, Kenneth Jennings, was Vice Principal) and ordained in 1969. After a curacy in Liverpool he was Chaplain of Christ Church, Oxford He was Vicar of Shephall and then St Peter in Thanet until his appointment to the Deanery.

Church of England titles
Preceded by Kenneth Jennings	Dean of Gloucester; 1997–2010	Succeeded by Stephen Lake
