= Peter Allix (priest) =

Anglican priest (1679–1758)

(John) Peter Allix, D.D. (22 August 1679 – 11 January 1758) was an Anglican dean in the early 18th century.

Allix was born in Alençon and graduated from Queens' College, Cambridge in 1703. From 1705 to 1714, he was a Fellow of Jesus College, Cambridge. He held livings at Swaffham, Fordham and Dry Drayton. He was Dean of Gloucester from 1729 until 1730; and Dean of Ely from then until his death in Castle Camps.

Church of England titles
Preceded by John Frankland	Dean of Gloucester; 1729–1730	Succeeded by Daniel Newcombe
Preceded by John Frankland	Dean of Ely; 1729–1730	Succeeded by Hugh Thomas
