= William Smyth (academic administrator) =

English academic administrator

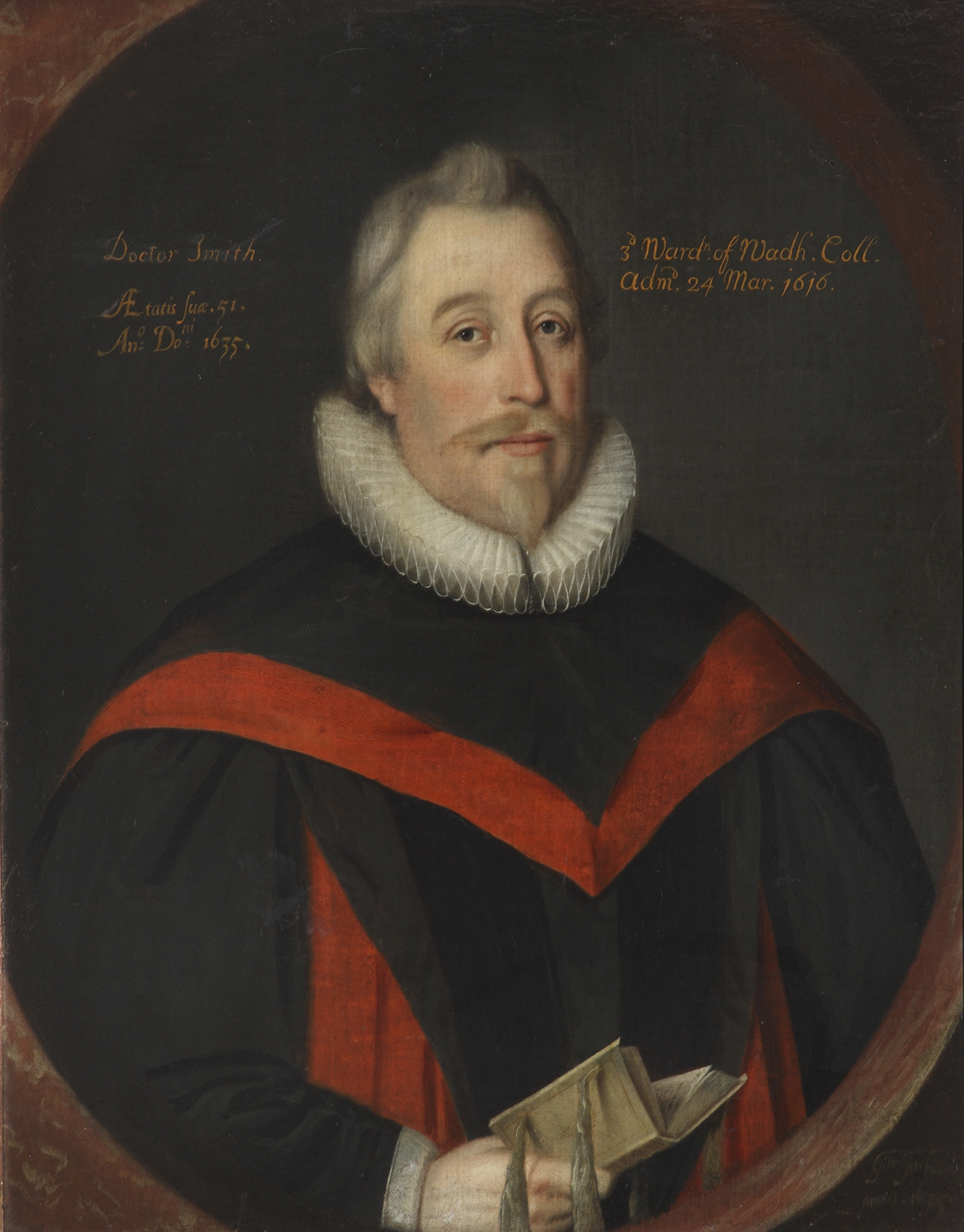
William Smyth in 1635

William Smyth D.D. (1582 – 6 May 1658), was an English academic administrator at the University of Oxford.

Smyth was elected Warden of Wadham College, Oxford on 24 March 1616/17, a post he held until he resigned on 7 September 1635. While Warden at Wadham College, Smyth was also Vice-Chancellor of Oxford University from 1630 until 1632. He died on 6 May 1658.

Academic offices
Preceded by John Flemming	Warden of Wadham College, Oxford; 1616/17–1635	Succeeded by Daniel Escot
Preceded by Accepted Frewen	Vice-Chancellor of Oxford University; 1630–1632	Succeeded by Brian Duppa
