= Dean of Gloucester =

Head and chair of the chapter of canons, the ruling body of Gloucester Cathedral

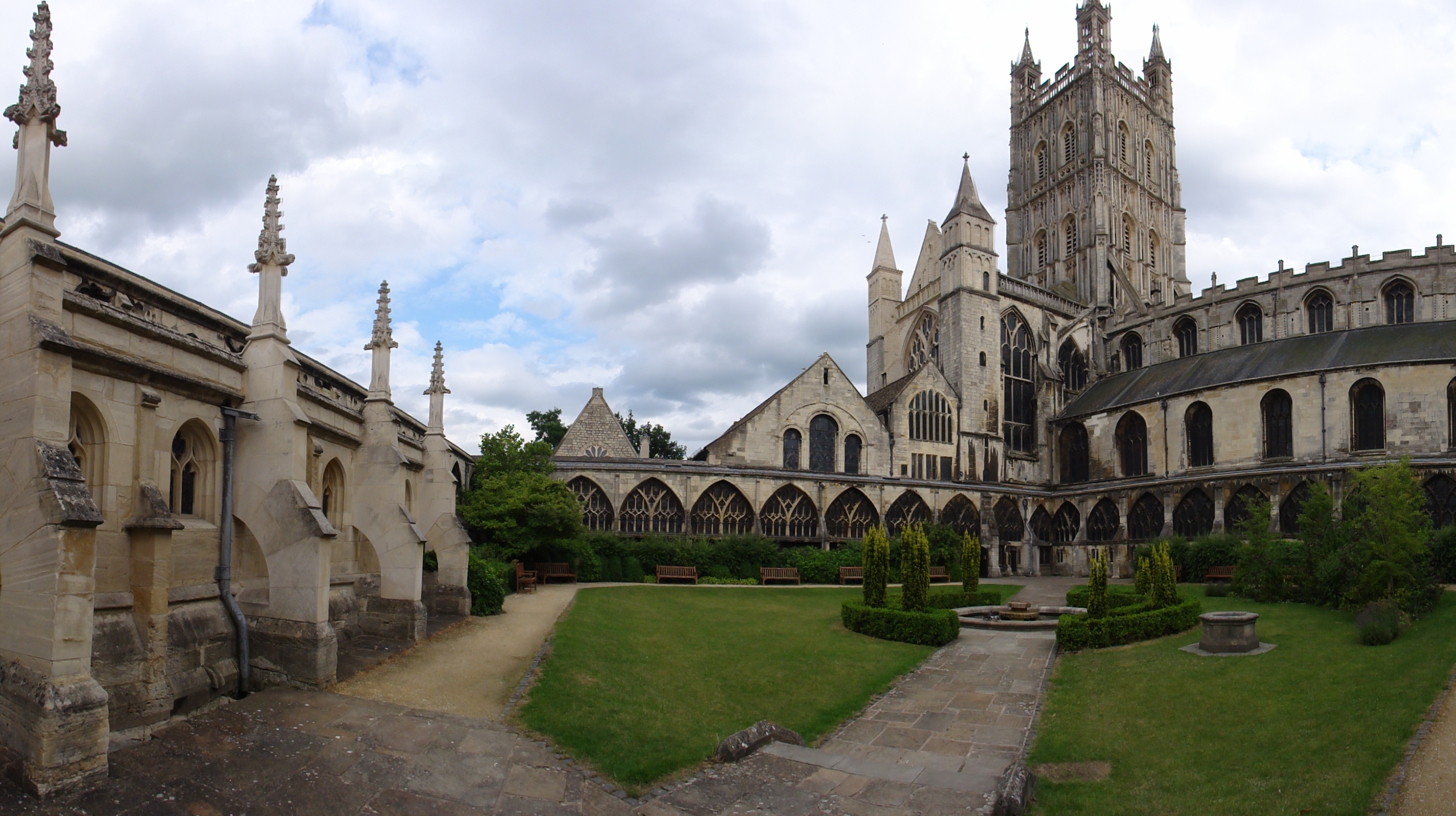
The cloisters courtyard at Gloucester Cathedral, July 2010

The Dean of Gloucester is the head (primus inter pares: first among equals) and chair of the chapter of canons - the ruling body of Gloucester Cathedral - and senior priest of the Diocese of Gloucester. The dean and chapter are based at Gloucester Cathedral. The cathedral is the mother church of the Diocese of Gloucester and seat of the Bishop of Gloucester.

== List of deans ==
=== Early modern ===
- 1541–1565 William Jennings
- 1565–1569 John Man
- 1569–1570 Thomas Cooper
- 1571–1580 Lawrence Humphrey
- 1580–1585 Vacancy
- 1585–1594 Anthony Rudd
- 1594–1607 Griffith Lewis
- 1607–1609 Thomas Moreton
- 1609–1616 Richard Field
- 1616–1621 William Laud
- 1621–1624 Richard Senhouse
- 1624–1631 Thomas Winniffe
- 1631–1631 George Warburton
- 1631–1643 Accepted Frewen
- 1643–1671 William Brough
- 1671–1673 Thomas Vyner
- 1673–1681 Robert Frampton
- 1681–1685 Thomas Marshall
- 1685–1707 William Jane
- 1707–1720 Knightly Chetwood
- 1720–1723 John Waugh
- 1723–1729 John Frankland
- 1729–1730 Peter Allix
- 1730–1758 Daniel Newcombe
- 1758–1799 Josiah Tucker

=== Late modern ===
- 1800–1808 John Luxmoore
- 1808–1825 John Plumptre
- 1825–1862 Edward Rice
- 1862–1884 Henry Law
- 1885–1885 Edward Bickersteth
- 1885–?1887 Montagu Butler
- 1887–1917 Donald Spence (Spence-Jones after 1904)
- 1917–1938 Henry Gee
- 1938–1953 Harold Costley-White
- 1953–1972 Seiriol Evans
- 1973–1982 Gilbert Thurlow
- 1983–1996 Kenneth Jennings
- 1997–2010 Nicholas Bury
- 2011–2022 Stephen Lake (became Bishop of Salisbury)
- 2023–present Andrew Zihni

== Sources ==
- s:Page:Fasti ecclesiae Anglicanae Vol.1 body of work.djvu/485
- s:Page:Fasti ecclesiae Anglicanae Vol.1 body of work.djvu/486
- s:Page:Fasti ecclesiae Anglicanae Vol.1 body of work.djvu/487
- http://www.british-history.ac.uk/report.aspx?compid=35315#s1
