= Harold Costley-White =

Anglican dean and author

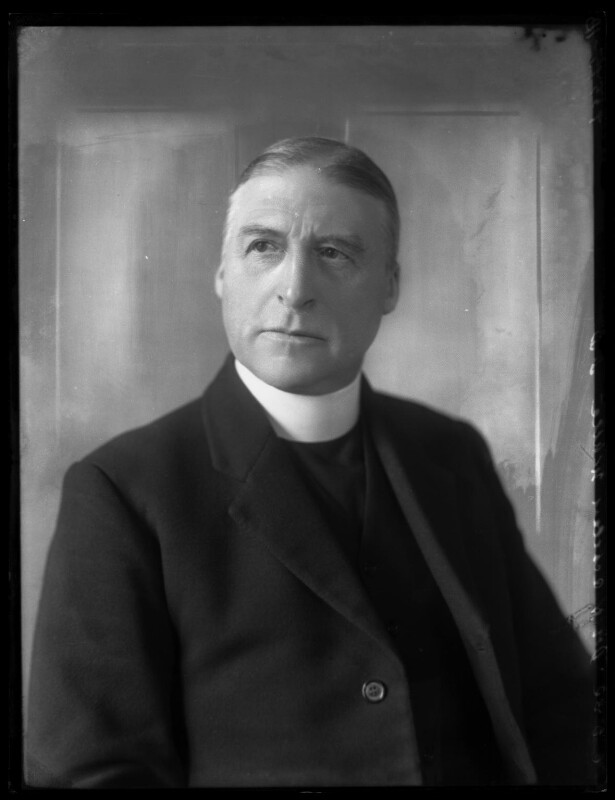
Costley-White in 1932

Harold Costley-White (9 November 1878 – 5 April 1966) was an Anglican dean and author in the mid-20th century.

He was educated at Malvern College and Balliol College, Oxford, and was ordained in 1902. He was an assistant master at Sherborne School (1901–03) and Rugby School (1903–10 and 1915–17) and held headships at Bradfield College (1910–14), Liverpool College (1917–19) and Westminster School (1919–36), where he was a member of the Old Westminsters' Lodge. In 1936 he became Canon of Westminster and two years later Dean of Gloucester, serving for 15 years.
He died in Wells, Somerset, in 1966 and was buried at Westminster Abbey.

Church of England titles
Preceded by Henry Gee	Dean of Gloucester; 1938–1953	Succeeded by Seiriol John Arthur Evans
