= Thomas Morton (bishop) =

English churchman and writer (1564–1659)

The Right Reverend Thomas Morton
- Bishop of Durham
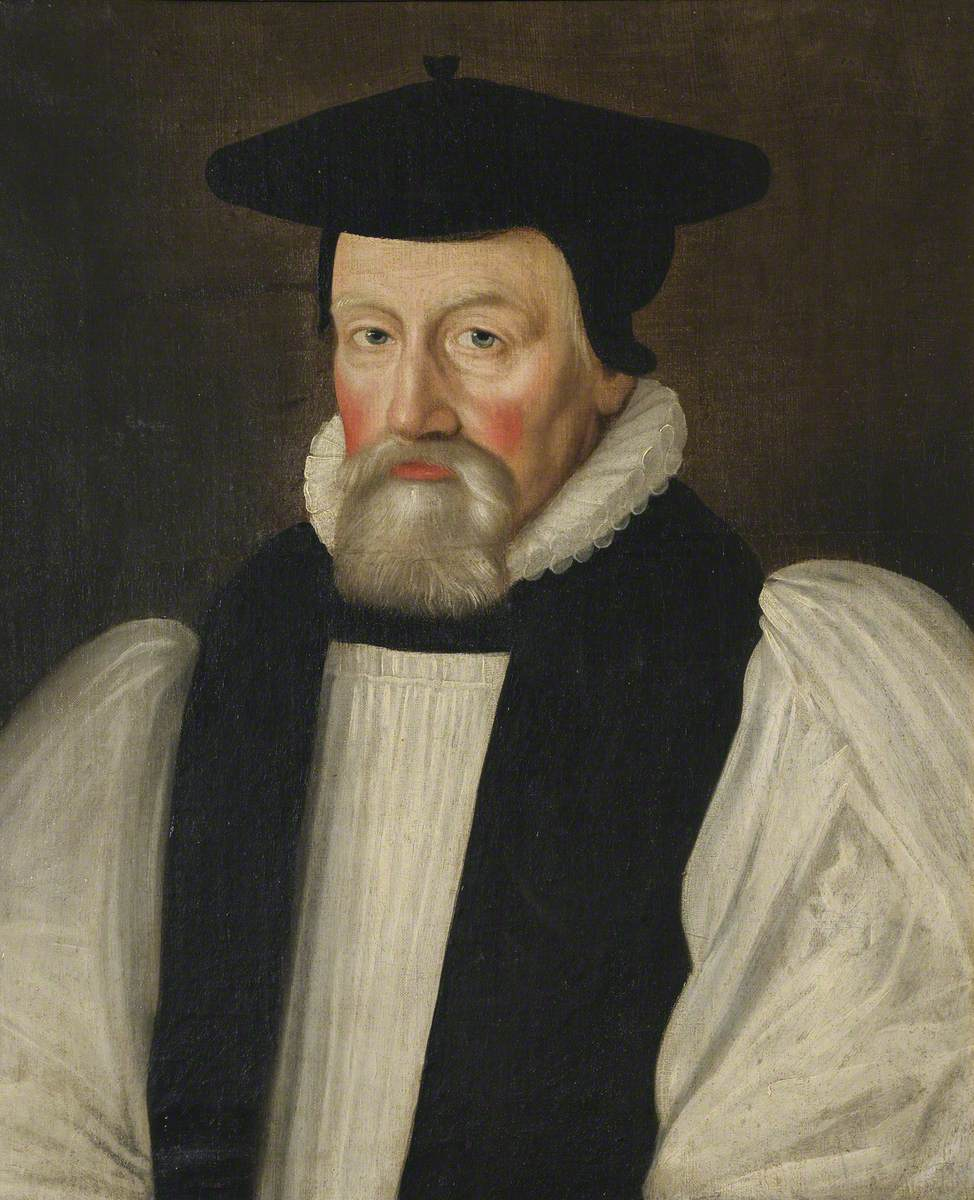
- Portrait by Simon Luttichuys
- Diocese: Diocese of Durham
- In office: 1632–1646 (Episcopacy abolished)
- Predecessor: John Howson
- Successor: Vacant (Civil War)
- Other posts: Dean of Gloucester (June 1607–1609); Dean of Winchester (1609–1616); Bishop of Chester (1616–1619); Bishop of Coventry & Lichfield (February 1619–1632)

Orders
- Ordination: 1594
- Consecration: 1616

Personal details
- Born: 20 March 1564 Pavement, York, East Riding of Yorkshire, England
- Died: 20 September 1659 (aged 95) Easton Maudit, Northamptonshire, England
- Buried: Easton Maudit parish church
- Denomination: Anglican
- Residence: Richard Morton & Elizabeth née Leedale
- Spouse: never married
- Education: St John's College, Cambridge

Thomas Morton (20 March 1564 – 20 September 1659) was an English churchman, bishop of several dioceses. Well-connected and in favour with James I, he was also a significant polemical writer against Roman Catholic views. He rose to become Bishop of Durham, but despite a record of sympathetic treatment of Puritans as a diocesan, and underlying Calvinist beliefs shown in the Gagg controversy, his royalism saw him descend into poverty under the Commonwealth.

== Life ==
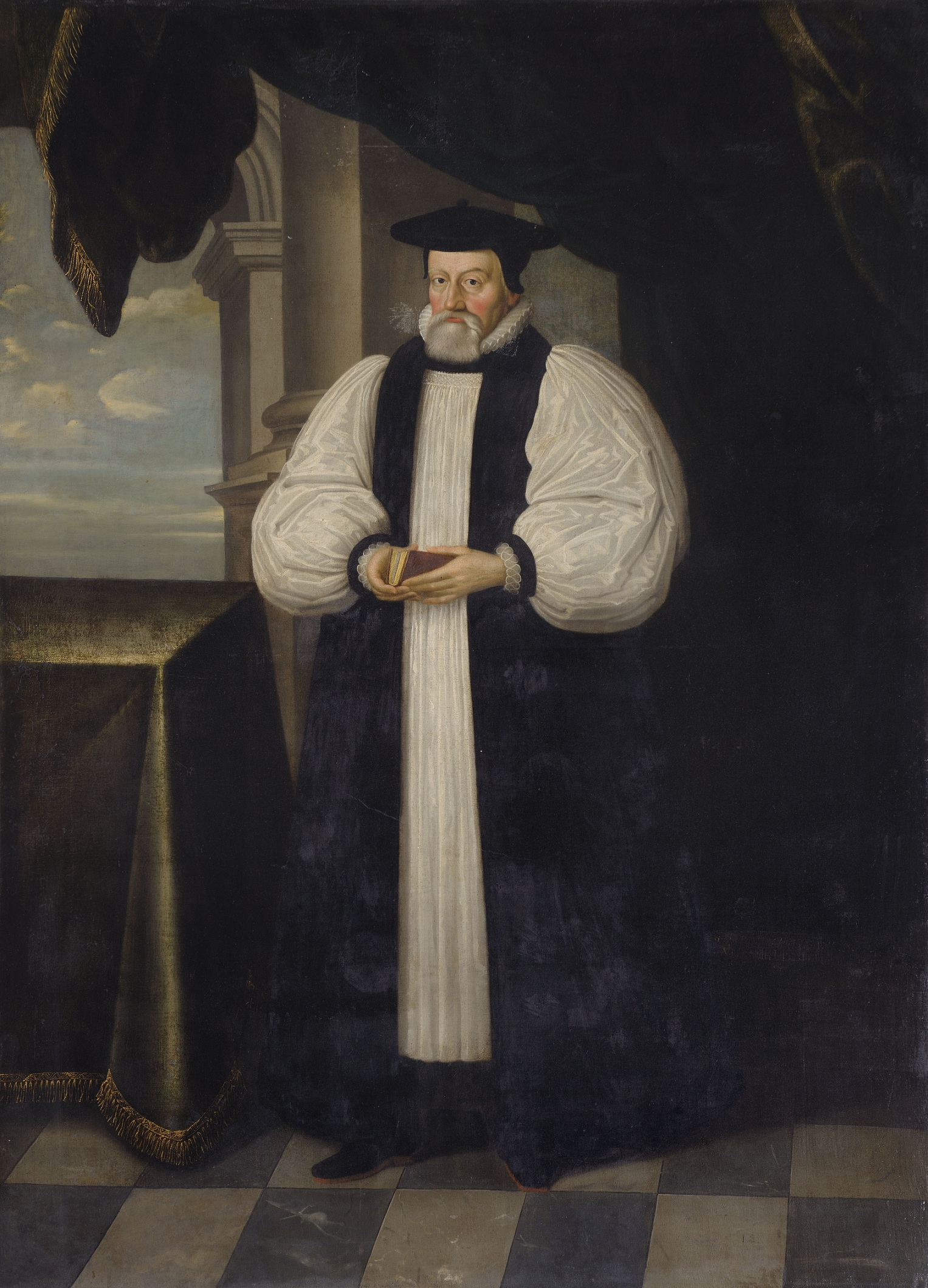
Morton in 1637, painted by Simon Luttichuys.

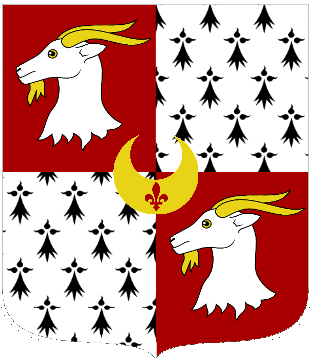
Arms: Quarterly Gules and Ermine in dexter chief and sinister base a goat's head erased Argent attired Or a fleur-de-lis in a crescent in fess point.

Morton was born in York on 20 March 1564, the sixth of the nineteen children of Richard Morton, mercer, of York, and alderman of the city, by his wife Elizabeth All Saints' Church, Pavement, York. He was brought up and grammar school educated in the city and nearby Halifax. In 1582, he became a pensioner at St John's College, Cambridge from which he graduated with a BA in 1584 and an MA in 1590. William Whitaker picked him out for a Fellow of the college, and he proceeded to the degree of BD in 1598, and that of DD 'with great distinction' in 1606.

Morton was ordained in 1592, and held the office of university lecturer in logic till in 1598 when he obtained the living of All Saints' Church, Long Marston, in Yorkshire. He was then chaplain to Henry Hastings, 3rd Earl of Huntingdon, Lord President of the North. In 1602, when the plague was raging at York, he devoted himself to the inmates of the pest-house. He conducted disputations with Roman Catholics; Herbert Croft, who became Bishop of Hereford, was claimed as Morton's convert to the Church of England.

In 1602 he was selected, with Richard Crakanthorpe as his colleague, to accompany Ralph Eure, 3rd Baron Eure when sent by Elizabeth as ambassador extraordinary to Rudolf II, Holy Roman Emperor and Christian IV of Denmark. He made the acquaintance of foreign scholars and theologians, including Jesuits, and collected books at Frankfurt and elsewhere. He met Hugh Broughton, then residing at Middelburg, to whom he proposed scriptural difficulties. On Elizabeth's death Morton returned to England, and became chaplain to Roger Manners, 5th Earl of Rutland. He had time for theological writing, and residence at Belvoir Castle enabled him to consult the libraries of London.

== Dean ==
Through Richard Bancroft's recommendation Morton was appointed one of James I's chaplains, and in 1606 became Dean of Gloucester, and, on the nomination of his former patron, Lord Eure, the lord president, member of the Council of the Marches. On accepting the deanery he offered to resign the living of Long Marston in favour of his friend John Donne, not yet in holy orders, but the offer was declined. In the same year he visited Oxford, where he was admitted to an ad eundem degree on 12 July. On this occasion he met eminent theologians, such as John King, John Rainolds, Henry Airey, and Daniel Featley.

In 1609 James I made him Dean of Winchester, where Thomas Bilson, who conferred on him the living of Alresford. At Winchester he became the intimate friend of Arthur Lake, then master of St. Cross, and of John Harmar, head-master of Winchester School. In 1610 he preached the sermon ad clerum at the opening of Convocation. When in London he lodged at the deanery of St Paul's Cathedral with John Overall, in whose house he enjoyed the society of Isaac Casaubon, who became a friend; and met Abraham Scultetus, Giovanni Diodati, and Pierre Du Moulin. On Casaubon's death in 1614 Morton had a monument erected to him in Westminster Abbey at his own cost. Among his associates from abroad at a later period were Friedrich Spanheim and Marco Antonio De Dominis.

In 1610 he was nominated to one of the seventeen fellowships in Chelsea College. Preferments then followed: in July of the same year he was collated by Tobias Matthew, Archbishop of York, to the canonry of Husthwaite in York Minster. In 1615, on the death of George Lloyd, James I nominated him Bishop of Chester; his consecration was delayed until 7 July 1616. The ceremony, of unusual stateliness, was performed at Lambeth Palace by George Abbot, Archbishop of Canterbury, assisted by Christopher Hampton, Archbishop of Armagh; Alexander Forbes, Bishop of Caithness; John King, Bishop of London; and John Overall, Bishop of Coventry and Lichfield. While the palace at Chester was readied he stayed with Christopher Hatton at Clay Hall, Essex, where he was seriously ill. He had resigned Alresford, but during his episcopate he held the living of Stopford, given him by James I in commendam.

== Bishop of Chester ==
Morton's see was large: Cheshire and Lancashire, the north-western portion of Yorkshire, and large parts of Cumberland and Westmoreland. Lancashire had a Catholic majority and Calvinist minority. Two significant works came out of this period, in which Morton had to deal with local issues outside the grander scope of the allegiance oath controversy to which he had devoted his efforts.

Nicholas Byfield preached in Chester to a congregation including John Bruen. Morton tried to reason with his Puritanical clergy. His tenure as bishop coincided with a watershed moment in opinion, namely a changed view of the relative threat of Catholicism and Protestant nonconformity.

Sabbatarianism was at issue, with an attempt by the magistrates to suppress the diversions customary on Sunday afternoons. James I asked advice from Morton, who recommended:

- that nothing should be permitted which might disturb the worshipers when engaged in divine service; that it should be left to each man's conscience whether he should take part in the accustomed sports when service was over; that all parishioners were to attend their own parish church; and
- those who refused to do so were to be debarred from engaging in the subsequent diversions.

James based the substance of his subsequent declaration on these points; but his publication of the Book of Sports in the following year led to new disturbances. Morton's own dealings with nonconformist clergy were marked by moderation.

== Bishop of Coventry and Lichfield ==
In 1618, on John Overall's translation to Norwich, Morton became Bishop of Coventry and Lichfield, on the recommendation of Lancelot Andrewes. With the bishopric he held the living of Clifton Camville in commendam. In 1621, he served on the commission for granting a dispensation to George Abbot, Archbishop of Canterbury, for the casual homicide of a keeper in Bramshill Park.

In February 1626, he took a leading part in the York House Conference on Richard Montagu's incriminated books. With John Preston, Morton did his best to impugn the statements contained in them on predestination and freewill.

== Bishop of Durham ==
In June 1632, Morton became Bishop of Durham, which he held by canonical right until his death in 1659, although parliament claimed to deprive him of it in 1647. Complaints were later made against him to the House of Commons by his prebendary, Peter Smart. He showed forbearance in claiming the rights of the palatinate, was liberal in almsgiving, and maintained poor scholars at the universities. On his journey to Scotland in 1633, Charles I and his suite were received by Morton in princely style; six years later, in May 1639, he again entertained Charles at the beginning of the First Bishops' War. The next year, in the month of August, the Scots crossed the River Tweed, and pushed on to the city of Durham. The cathedral clergy fled, and Morton himself retired into Yorkshire.

Early in 1641 he was in London attending Parliament, and was nominated a member of the sub-committee to prepare matters for the consideration of the abortive committee of the lords appointed on 1 March—the day of William Laud's committal to the Tower of London—to take cognisance of innovations in religion. In the following December a mob threatened to drag him out of his coach when on his way to the House of Lords. Morton never took his seat in the lords again. Two days later, 29 December, he joined in John Williams' protest against the legality of all acts done in the enforced absence of the Lords Spiritual. For this he and his 11 associates were next day impeached of high treason on William Prynne's motion; and the same night they were all committed to the Tower, with the exception of Morton and the aged Robert Wright, Bishop of Lichfield, who were allowed to remain in the house of the usher of the black rod.

After four months' imprisonment Morton was released without a trial, and remained unmolested at Durham House, in The Strand, till April 1645, when he was again brought before the bar of the House of Commons on the charges of baptising the infant daughter of the Earl of Rutland according to the rites of the Church of England, and of refusing to surrender the seal of the County palatine of Durham. He was committed to the custody of the serjeant-at-arms for six months.

On the abolition of episcopacy in 1646 an annual income was assigned to him, but without indications of by whom it was to be paid not being specified. He obtained a sum of £1,000 from the committee at Goldsmiths' Hall, which he employed in paying his debts and purchasing an annuity. In 1648 he was driven from Durham House soldiers, who took forcible possession of it. He then resided with his friends, the Earl and Countess of Rutland, at Exeter House in The Strand; and the passed his time with royalist lay friends. Returning to London on horseback, he fell in with Christopher, son and heir of Henry Yelverton. Christopher did not recognise the bishop. To his inquiry who he was, Morton replied, 'I am that old man, the Bishop of Durham, in spite of all your votes;' asked where he was going, his answer was, 'To London, to live there a little while, and then to die.' Ultimately, Yelverton invited him to his house at Easton Maudit, ten miles from Northampton. Morton became a member of the family, and tutor to Henry, his eldest son.

At Easton Maudit, Morton held secret ordinations. Yelverton died in 1654. Morton died there on 22 September 1659. He was buried in the Yelverton chapel of the parish church. His chaplain, John Barwick, preached the funeral sermon. He died unmarried.

== Patronage ==
Morton was a patron of learned men. At the beginning of the First English Civil War, he offered Thomas Fuller a home and maintenance. Isaac Basire was one of the scholars whom he brought forward. Ralph Brownrig, Henry Ferne and John Barwick were among his chaplains. He was a patron of foreign Reformed theologians, whom he received into his house and treated generously. He favoured the work of John Durie for reconciling Protestants. He numbered Richard Hooker among his friends as well as Hooker's biographer Isaak Walton, who wrote of the information he derived from Morton. William Laud was one of his correspondents.

== Views ==
In theology he belonged to the school of James Ussher and William Bedell, and had little sympathy with Laudianism. Richard Baxter speaks of him as 'belonging to that class of episcopal divines who differ in nothing considerable from the rest of the reformed churches except in church government,' and Edward Hyde, 1st Earl of Clarendon classes him with 'the less formal and more popular prelates'. He was a sincere episcopalian, regarding ordination by presbyters valid in case of necessity, no such necessity however warranting it in the Church of England.

From the moderation of his ecclesiastical views he was at one time well regarded by William Prynne. Edmund Calamy recorded his liberal treatment of Puritans such as John Hieron, Richard Mather, and John Shawe of Christ's College, Cambridge.

His attitude towards the Roman Catholic Church was hostile; he was one of the only three bishops who, according to a statement made to Gregorio Panzani, the papal envoy, by Richard Montagu, were 'counted violently bent against the Papists'. Morton corresponded with Sibrandus Lubbertus on matters concerning anti-papal polemic, and their views were close. Lubbertus was a leading contra-Remonstrant and Morton was one of his significant English supporters in the conflict over the appointment of Conrad Vorstius at the University of Leiden.

== Legacy ==
One of Morton's last acts before his death was to publish a denial that he had in a speech in the House of Lords acknowledged the fiction of the Nag's Head Consecration of Matthew Parker, Archbishop of Canterbury. By his will he left money to the poor of the parish in which he died, and his chalice to All Saints, York, the parish in which he was born. He also bequeathed a silver-gilt chalice and paten of large size for the use of the chapel recently added to the manor-house by Henry Yelverton. A codicil to his will contained a declaration of his faith and of his adhesion to the Church of England.

In the 1680s Richard Baxter, who as a schoolboy received confirmation from Morton in Durham, called him "one of the learnedest and best bishops that ever I knew".

== Works ==
He gained a reputation as a Protestant controversialist, and published numerous works against Roman Catholicism, prominent among them being the Apologia catholica (1605) and A Catholicke Appeale (1609).

Morton's major works were:

- 'Apologia Catholica, ex meris Jesuitarum contradictionibus conflata,' &c., part 1, London [1605–1606]. John Donne may have assisted him in this work.
- 'An Exact Discoverie of Romish Doctrine in the case of Conspiracie and Rebellion,' &c., 1605.
- 'Apologiæ Catholicæ, in qua parodoxa, hæreses, blasphemiæ, scelera, quæ Jesuitæ et Pontificii alii Protestantibus impingunt, fere omnia, ex ipsorum Pontificiorum testimoniis apertis diluuntur, libri duo. De notis Ecclesiæ Editio castigatior,' 2pts. London, 1606.
- 'A Full Satisfaction concerning a Double Romish Iniquitie, hainous Rebellion, and more than heathenish Æquivocation. Containing three parts,' London, 1606.
- 'A Preamble unto an Incounter with P. R. (R. Parsons), the Author of the deceitfull Treatise of Mitigation: concerning the Romish Doctrine both in question of Rebellion and of Aequivocation,' London, 1608.
- 'A Catholic Appeal for Protestants, out of the Confessions of the Romane Doctors; particularly answering the misnamed Catholike Apologie for the Romane Faith, out of the Protestants [by J. Brereley],' London, 1610.
- A Direct Answer unto the scandalous Exceptions which T. Higgons hath lately objected against D. Morton [i.e. against his "Apologia Catholica"]. In which there is principally discussed two of the most notorious Objections used by the Romanists, viz.: (1) Martin Luther's Conference with the Divell; and (2) The Sence of the Article of Christ, His Discension into Hell (Animadversions), London, 1609. Against Theophilus Higgons. Higgons was writing at this time from a Catholic point of view; the work was an animadversion on a passage of his. Where Higgons argued that the Descensus controversy was more important than matter of clerical dress for which nonconformists were deprived, Morton argued that Catholic teaching on that matter was unclear, as based on scripture or patristics.
- 'The Encounter against M. Parsons, by a Review of his last Sober Reckoning and his Exceptions urged in the Treatise of his Mitigation ...,' London, 1610.
- 'A Defence of the Innocencie of the Three Ceremonies of the Church of England, viz., the Surplice, Crosse after Baptisme, and Kneeling at the Receiving of the Blessed Sacrament', London, 1618. This work arose out of Morton's diocesan dealings with Puritans, and in it Morton argued that deprivals of nonconforming clergy only took place for obstinate and public opposition to church doctrine over extended periods.William Hinde argued that the surplice was not Biblical, and that ceremonies should be matters indifferent. Robert Nicholls of Wrenbury had written a treatise against kneeling for Morton, printed later in 1660. Kneeling had formed one of the matters over which clergy of the diocese of Lincoln had petitioned James I in 1604 for change in the Book of Common Prayer in 1604; an abridged form of the petition was circulating in 1617 as a book printed covertly in Leiden by William Jones.
- 'Causa Regia, sive De Authoritate et Dignitate principum Christianorum adversus R. Bellarminum,' 1620.
- 'The Grand Imposture of the (now) Church of Rome manifested in this one Article of the new Romane Creede, viz., "The Holy Catholike and Apostolike Romane Church, Mother and Mistresse of all other Churches, without which there is no salvation." The second edition, revised ... with ... Additions,' London, 1628.
- 'Of the Institution of the Sacrament of the Blessed Bodie and Blood of Christ,' &c., 2 pts., London, 1631; 2nd edit. 'enlarged ... with particular answers,' London, 1635
- 'A Discharge of Five Imputations of Mis-Allegations falsely charged upon the Bishop of Duresme by an English Baron (Arundell of Wardour),' London, 1633.
- 'Sacris ordinibus non-rite initiati tenentur ad eos ritus ineundos. Non datur purgatorium Pontificium aut Platonicum' (in verse), Cambridge, 1633.
- 'Antidotum adversus Ecclesiæ Romanæ de merito proprie dicto ex condigno venenum,' Cantabr. 1637.
- 'De Eucharistia Controversiæ Decisio,' Cantabr. 1640.
- 'The Opinion of ... T. Morton ... concerning the peace of the Church,' 1641; a Latin version appeared in 1688.
- 'The Necessity of Christian Subjection demonstrated ... Also a Tract intituled "Christus Dei,"' &c., 1643; posthumously printed.
- 'Ezekiel's Wheels: a Treatise concerning Divine Providence,' London, 1653.
- ‘Episkopos Apostolikos, or the Episcopacy of the Church of England justified to be Apostolical. … Before which is prefixed a preface … by Sir H. Yelverton,’ London, 1670.

Other works of the 1590s which have been ascribed to this Thomas Morton were the works of another Thomas Morton, of Berwick and Christ's College, Cambridge.

== Sources ==
- R. C. Richardson (1972), Puritanism in North-West England: a regional study of the Diocese of Chester to 1642; Internet Archive.
- This article incorporates text from a publication now in the public domain: Venables, Edmund (1894). "Morton, Thomas (1564–1659)". In Lee, Sidney (ed.). Dictionary of National Biography. Vol. 39. London: Smith, Elder & Co.

Church of England titles
Preceded by Griffith Lewis	Dean of Gloucester; 1607–1609	Succeeded by Richard Field
Preceded by George Abbot	Dean of Winchester; 1609–1616	Succeeded by John Young
Preceded by George Lloyd	Bishop of Chester; 1616–1618	Succeeded by John Bridgeman
Preceded by John Overall	Bishop of Coventry and Lichfield; 1618–1632	Succeeded by Robert Wright
Preceded by John Howson	Bishop of Durham; 1632–1646	Vacant Episcopacy abolished (Civil War) Title next held by John Cosin
Political offices
Preceded by John Howson	Lord Lieutenant of Durham; 1632–1642	Succeeded by Henry Vane the Elder (Parliamentary)
