= Richard Sterne (bishop) =

Archbishop of York from 1664 to 1683

The Most Reverend and Right Honourable Richard Sterne
- Archbishop of York
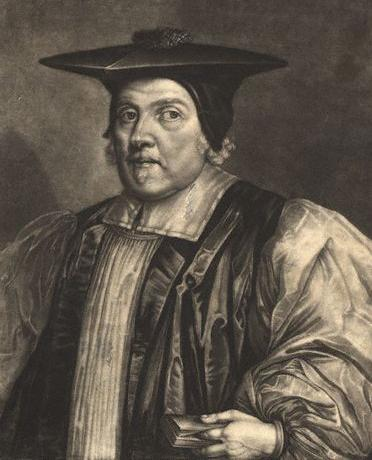
- In office: 1664–1683
- Predecessor: Accepted Frewen
- Successor: John Dolben

Orders
- Consecration: 2 December 1660 by Accepted Frewen

Personal details
- Born: c. 1596 Mansfield, Nottinghamshire
- Died: 1683
- Education: Trinity College, Cambridge

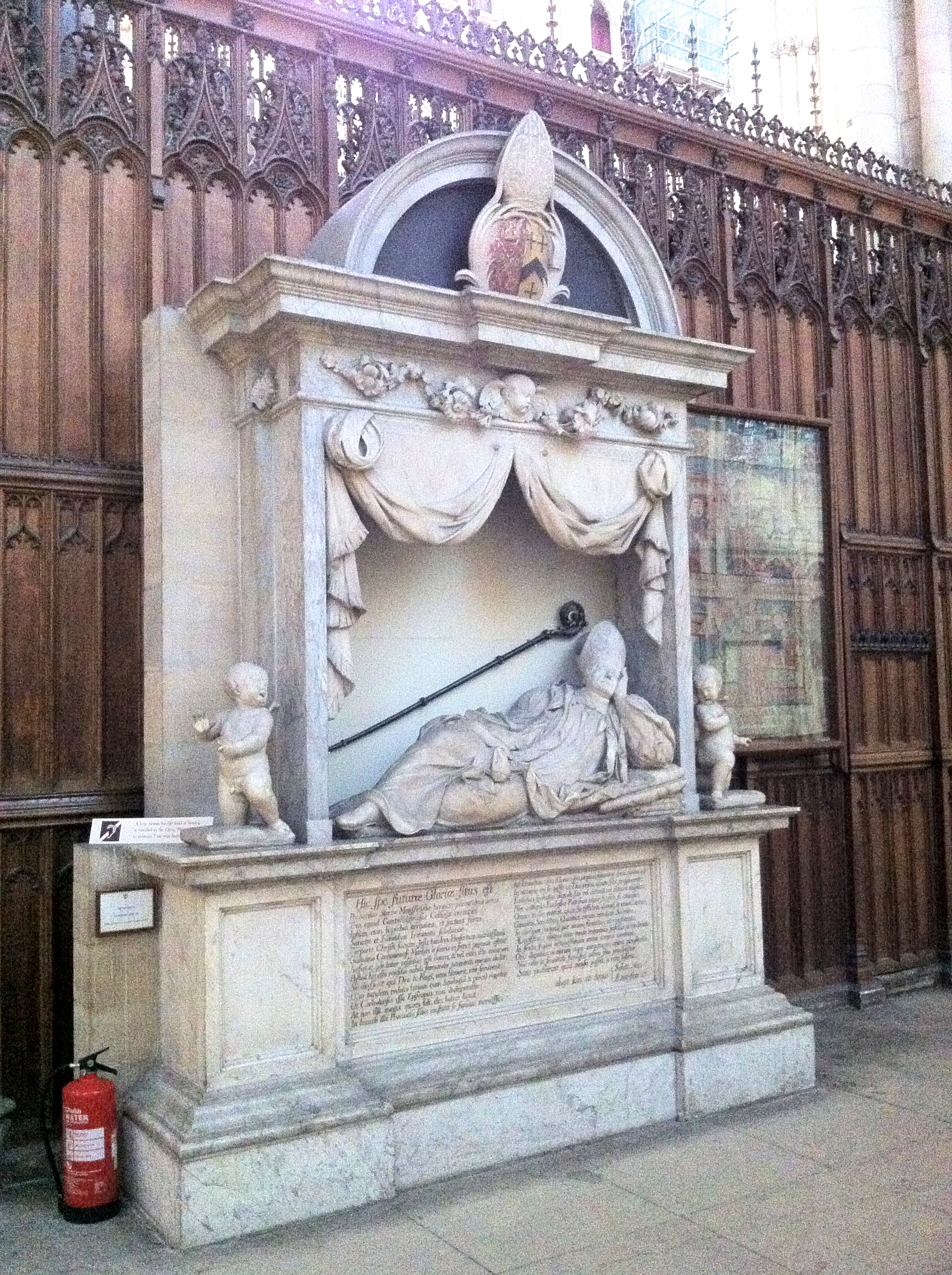
Memorial to Archbishop Richard Sterne in the north choir aisle of York Minster by Grinling Gibbons.

Richard Sterne (c. 1596–1683) was a Church of England priest, Archbishop of York from 1664 to 1683.

== Life ==
Sterne was born in about 1596 in Mansfield, Nottinghamshire. He was educated at Trinity College, Cambridge, where he graduated MA in 1618, BD in 1625 and DD in 1635. He was elected a fellow of Benet College (now Corpus Christi College), Cambridge in 1623 and then served as Master of Jesus College, Cambridge, from 1634.

Around 1633, he became chaplain to Archbishop Laud. From 1642, he held the rectories of Yeovilton and Harleton. A Royalist, he was arrested and imprisoned by the Parliamentarians later the same year. In 1644, he was formally dismissed as Master of Jesus and, in 1645, he lost his rectories, although he was released from prison.

At the Restoration in 1660, Sterne was appointed Bishop of Carlisle — he was elected to the See on 15 November 1660, confirmed 1 December, and consecrated a bishop on 2 December 1660. From there he was translated to York in 1664 — he was elected to that See on 28 April and confirmed on 31 May. He is said to have been one of those who assisted in revising the Book of Common Prayer in 1662. He also assisted Brian Walton with the English Polyglot Bible and himself wrote Summa Logicae (published posthumously in 1685). He founded scholarships at both Corpus Christi and Jesus Colleges.

== Family ==
Sterne was married to Elizabeth, daughter of Edward Dickinson of Farnborough. They had 13 children, including Richard Sterne, MP for Ripon, and Simon Sterne, father of Archdeacon Jaques Sterne and grandfather of Laurence Sterne, who would find literary fame in the 1760s as author of The Life and Opinions of Tristram Shandy, Gent. and live as a curate and parson in Yorkshire.

== Arms ==
Coat of arms of Richard Sterne
Notes While serving as a bishop Sterne's arms would be displayed impaled with the arms of the diocese and topped by a mitre. Escutcheon Or a chevron between three crosslets Sable.

== Sources ==
- Chisholm, Hugh, ed. (1911). "Sterne, Richard" . Encyclopædia Britannica. Vol. 25 (11th ed.). Cambridge University Press.
- Pollard, A. F.; Spurr, John. "Sterne, Richard (1595/6–1683)". Oxford Dictionary of National Biography (online ed.). Oxford University Press. doi:10.1093/ref:odnb/26413. (Subscription, Wikipedia Library access or UK public library membership required.)

Academic offices
Preceded by William Beale	Master of Jesus College, Cambridge; 1634–1644	Succeeded by Thomas Young
Preceded by John Worthington	Master of Jesus College, Cambridge; 1660–1655	Succeeded by John Pearson
Church of England titles
Preceded by James Ussher vacancy from 1643	Bishop of Carlisle; 1660–1664	Succeeded by Edward Rainbowe
Preceded by Accepted Frewen	Archbishop of York; 1664–1683	Succeeded by John Dolben
