= Andrew Zihni =

British Anglican priest

The Very Reverend Andrew Stephen Zihni
- Dean of Gloucester
- Church: Church of England
- Diocese: Gloucester
- In office: April 2023 – present
- Predecessor: Stephen Lake

Orders
- Ordination: 2003 (priest)

Personal details
- Born: Andrew Zihni; 4 February 1977 (age 49) British Hong Kong
- Denomination: Anglicanism
- Education: Merton College, Oxford; St Stephen's House, Oxford

Andrew Stephen Zihni (born 4 February 1977) is a Hong Kong-born British Anglican priest. Since 2023, he has served as Dean of Gloucester.

== Life and career ==
Zihni was born on 4 February 1977 in Hong Kong, and grew up there before moving to the United Kingdom with his family.

He was educated at Merton College, Oxford and trained for priesthood at St Stephen's House, Oxford. He served as a curate in the parishes of Goldthorpe and Hickleton in the Diocese of Sheffield, and was ordained as a priest in 2003. In 2006, he became Minor Canon and School Chaplain at St George's Chapel, Windsor. In 2014, he became assistant director of Vocations for the Diocese of Southwark and Honorary Minor Canon at Southwark Cathedral, also serving as Priest Vicar at Westminster Abbey from 2018. In January 2021, he became Canon Precentor of Southwark Cathedral.

After his appointment as Dean of Gloucester was announced on 19 January 2023, he was installed as Dean on 23 April.

Church of England titles
Preceded by Stephen Lake	Dean of Gloucester; 2023–	incumbent
