= Thomas Vyner (priest) =

Thomas Vyner DD (1629 - 11 April 1673) was a Church of England minister and Dean of Gloucester

== Family ==
He was the son of William Vyner of Eathorpe, Warwickshire and younger brother of Sir Robert Vyner, 1st Baronet. He obtained his BA at Catherine Hall, Cambridge in 1650. He married Elizabeth, daughter of Henry Izod(d. 1650), rector of Stanton, Gloucestershire. In 1652 he succeeded his father-in-law as rector of Stanton and three years later was incorporated at the University of Oxford. He was subsequently awarded a BD in 1662 and became DD in 1671 by letters patent from the king.

He died in 1673 aged 44, and was buried in the Lady Chapel of Gloucester Cathedral. He left a son Thomas (d. 1706), who inherited the Gautby estate of his uncle Sir Robert Vyner, and two daughters: Elizabeth married John Snell of Salisbury Hall, Hertfordshire and Honor married Thomas Leigh, merchant of London, brother of Sir Francis Leigh.

Clement Barksdale dedicated his translation of Hugo Grotius to Sir Robert Vyner in 1675 in remembrance of Vyner, referring to 'his learned, generous, and obliging Converse'.

== Career ==
He was appointed:

- Rector of Stanton, Gloucestershire, 1652 - c. 1665
- Rural Dean of Campden
- Rector of Paulersbury, Northamptonshire 1660 - 1663
- Prebendary of the second stall, Gloucester Cathedral, 1665 - 1671
- Rector of Bradwell by Sea, Essex, 1667 - 1673
- Canon of the 9th stall, St George's Chapel, Windsor Castle 1670 - 1673
- Archdeacon of Gloucester 1671 - 1673
- Dean of Gloucester Cathedral 1671 - 1673
