= Stephen Lake =

British clergyman, bishop of Salisbury since 2022

The Right Reverend Stephen Lake
- Bishop of Salisbury
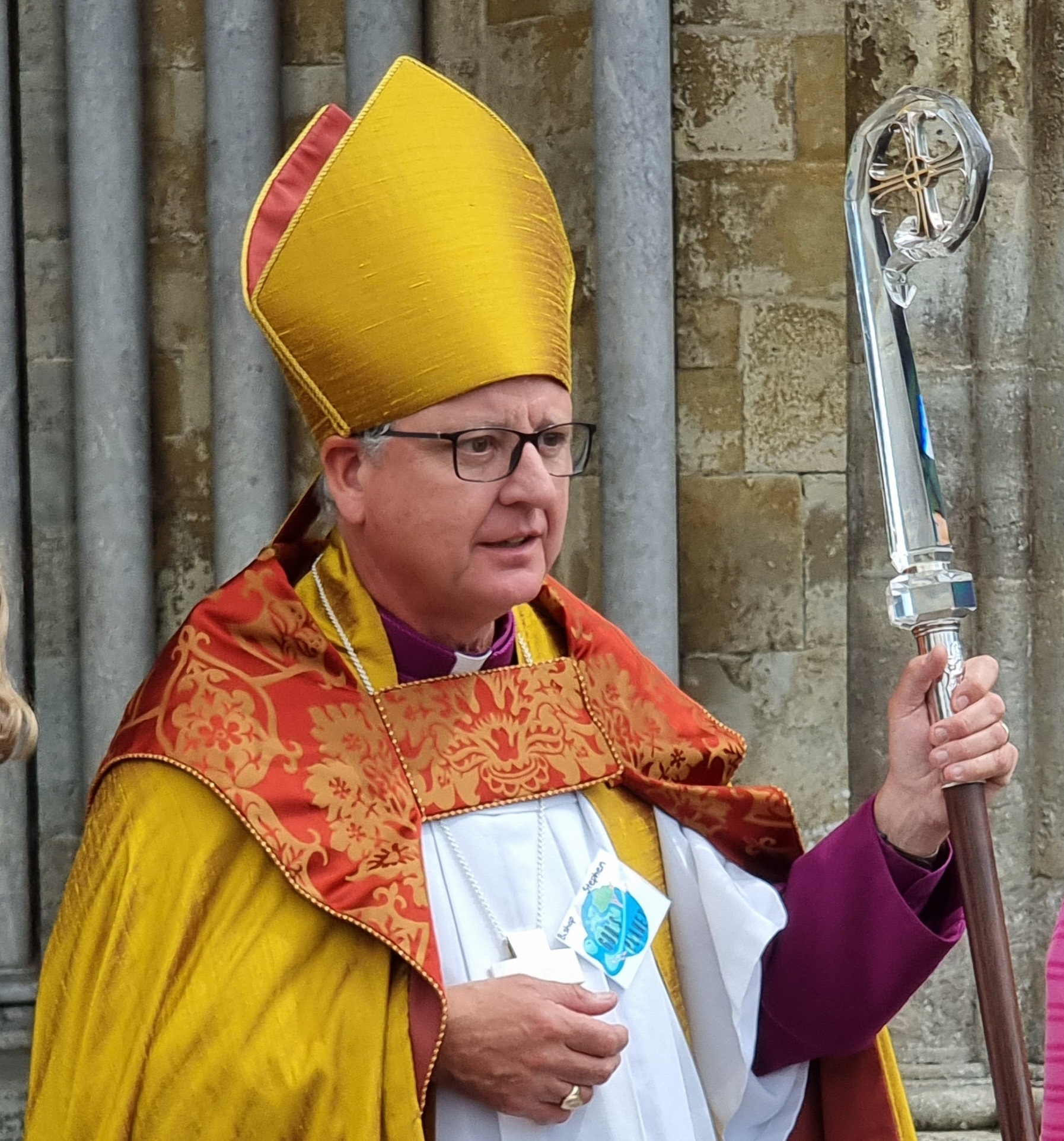
- Bishop Lake in 2022
- Church: Church of England
- Diocese: Diocese of Salisbury
- In office: April 2022 to present
- Predecessor: Nick Holtam
- Previous post: Dean of Gloucester (2011–2022)

Orders
- Ordination: 1988 (deacon); 1989 (priest)
- Consecration: 25 April 2022 by Justin Welby

Personal details
- Born: 17 December 1963 (age 62)
- Denomination: Anglican

Member of the House of Lords
- Lord Spiritual
- Bishop of Salisbury; 23 July 2026

Stephen David Lake (born 17 December 1963) is an Anglican clergyman and author who has been Bishop of Salisbury since April 2022; he was previously Dean of Gloucester from June 2011.

After a curacy at Sherborne Abbey he was priest in charge at St Aldhelm's Church, Branksome then Rural Dean of Poole. He was a Canon Residentiary and Sub-Dean at St Albans Cathedral from 2001 until June 2011, when he became Dean of Gloucester. He was confirmed as Bishop of Salisbury in April 2022.

== Early life and education ==
Lake was born on 17 December 1963 in Poole, Dorset, England. After serving as a Community Service Volunteer he attended Chichester Theological College and was ordained in 1988 as deacon and 1989 as priest.

In 2011, he studied part time at King's College London, receiving a Master of Arts in Theology, Politics and Faith-Based Organisations. In 2016, he was made an Honorary Fellow for services to the City of Gloucester and the University by the University of Gloucestershire.

== Ordained ministry ==
Lake was ordained at Salisbury Cathedral and served his curacy at Sherborne Abbey. In 1992, he became vicar of Branksome St Aldhelm's Church, becoming Assistant Rural Dean of Poole in 1996 and Rural Dean of Poole in 2000.

In 2001, Lake became Sub-Dean and Canon Residentiary of St Albans Cathedral and was acting Dean between 2003 and 2004. From 2003 to 2011, he was a member of the General Synod.

In 2011, he became Dean of Gloucester; he was instituted at Gloucester Cathedral on 12 June. He was a Church Commissioner, acting Chair of the Bishoprics and Cathedrals Committee, and a member of the Church of England Emerging Church Steering Group. He was also lead Dean for safeguarding.

In Gloucester, his particular interests were the delivery of Project Pilgrim, the £10m development project for the Cathedral; and his role as Chair of the Regeneration Advisory Board for the City of Gloucester, which became the City Centre Commission in 2021.

=== Episcopal ministry ===
In January 2022 it was announced that he had been appointed Bishop of Salisbury, to take office "after Easter" 2022. His election was confirmed on 1 April 2022 (at which point he legally became Bishop of Salisbury); he was consecrated as a bishop on 25 April 2022 by Justin Welby, Archbishop of Canterbury, at Southwark Cathedral.

In April 2026, Lake "stepped back" as Bishop of Salisbury and resigned as a trustee of the Church Commissioners when a financial audit identified "potential financial irregularities in relation to two separate funds". Safeguarding complaints, related to his conduct and involving adults, were also made in 2026.

=== Views ===
In November 2023, he was one of 44 Church of England bishops who signed an open letter supporting the use of the Prayers of Love and Faith (i.e. blessings for same-sex couples) and called for "Guidance being issued without delay that includes the removal of all restrictions on clergy entering same-sex civil marriages, and on bishops ordaining and licensing such clergy".

== Personal life ==
Lake has been a member of the Scout Association since he was a Cub Scout and is currently chair of Gloucestershire Scouts and vice president of Dorset Scouts, having been a national trustee from 2007 to 2012.

He is married to Carol and they have three children.

== Published books ==
- Confirmation Prayer Book, ISBN 0281054622 (2002)
- Welcoming Marriage: A Practical and Pastoral Guide to the New Legislation, ISBN 0715141724 (2009)
- Let the Children Come to Communion, ISBN 0281057958 (2006)

Church of England titles
Preceded by Nicholas Bury	Dean of Gloucester; 2011–2022	Succeeded by Andrew Zihni
Preceded by Nick Holtam	Bishop of Salisbury; 2022–present	Incumbent
