= Donald Spence Jones =

British Anglican priest (1836–1917)

Henry Donald Maurice Spence (Spence Jones from 1904; 14 January 1836 – 2 November 1917) was an Anglican dean and author in the last decades of the 19th century and the start of the 20th.

The son of George Spence MP QC, Spence was born at Pall Mall, London and educated at Westminster School and Corpus Christi College, Cambridge, winning the Carus Prize in 1862 and 1866, and the Scholefield Prize in 1866, and graduating B.A. 1865, M.A. 1868, D.D. 1887. He was ordained deacon in 1865 and priest in 1866.

In his academic career, Spence was Professor of English Literature and Modern Languages, and Hebrew Lecturer at St David's College Lampeter 1865–1870; Principal of Gloucester Theological College 1875–1877; and Professor of Ancient History at the Royal Academy from 1906.

In the church, he was Rector of St Mary de Crypt Church, Gloucester 1870–1877, then Vicar and Rural Dean of St Pancras 1877–1886, when he became Dean of Gloucester, a post he held until his death. As Dean, he banned performances of Edward Elgar's choral work The Dream of Gerontius from Gloucester Cathedral from 1900 until 1910 because of Roman Catholic references in its text.

On 11 April 1871, Spence married Louise Madeline Maria, daughter of David Jones MP. He adopted the additional surname Jones (his wife's maiden name) in 1904.

== Works ==
- Talmudical Commentary on Genesis, 1883
- Cloister Life in Days of Cœur de Lion, 1892
- The Church of England: a History for the People (4 vols), 1904
- The Early Christians in Rome, 1910
- "The Pulpit Commentary", 1909–1919

Church of England titles
Preceded by Henry Montagu Butler	Dean of Gloucester; 1886–1917	Succeeded by Henry Gee
