= William Jennings (priest) =

William Jennings, S.T.D. was the last Prior of St Oswald's Priory, Gloucester, dissolved in 1536. He was a chaplain to Henry VIII and became the first Dean of Gloucester, serving from 1541. He held the office of dean in plurality with five other livings, including Cromhall. In 1565 he was excused from attending the episcopal visitation on account of his infirmity and he died shortly after on 4 November 1565. He was buried in Gloucester Cathedral 'before the choir door'.

Church of England titles
Preceded by Anthony Rudd	Dean of Gloucester; 1594–1707	Succeeded by Thomas Morton
