= John Howson (bishop) =

English academic and bishop

The Right Reverend John Howson
- Bishop of Durham
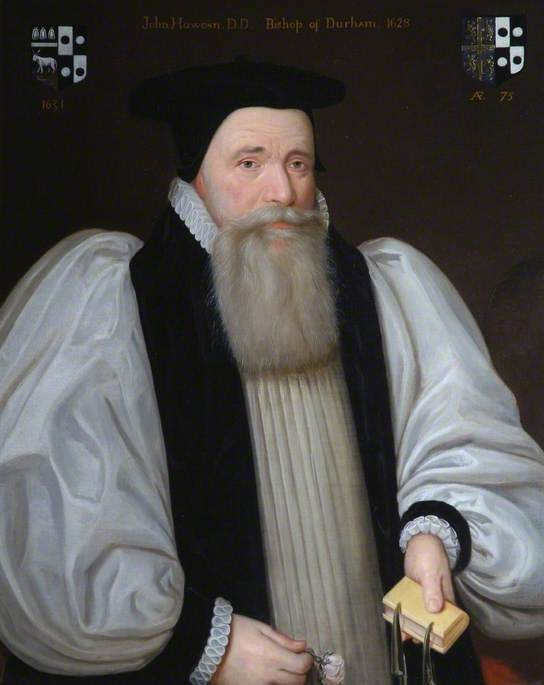
- Diocese: Diocese of Durham
- In office: 1628–1632
- Predecessor: George Montaigne
- Successor: Thomas Morton
- Other posts: Vice-Chancellor of the University of Oxford (1602); Bishop of Oxford (1619–1628); Lord Lieutenant of Durham (1628–1632)

Personal details
- Born: c. 1557 Farringdon Without, London, England
- Died: 6 February 1632
- Buried: St Paul's Cathedral
- Denomination: Anglican
- Spouse: Jane Floyd (married 10 August 1601 at Black Bourton)
- Children: at least one, Anne Farnaby
- Education: St Paul's School, London; Christ Church, Oxford

Ordination history of John Howson
History
Episcopal consecration
- Date: 9 May 1619

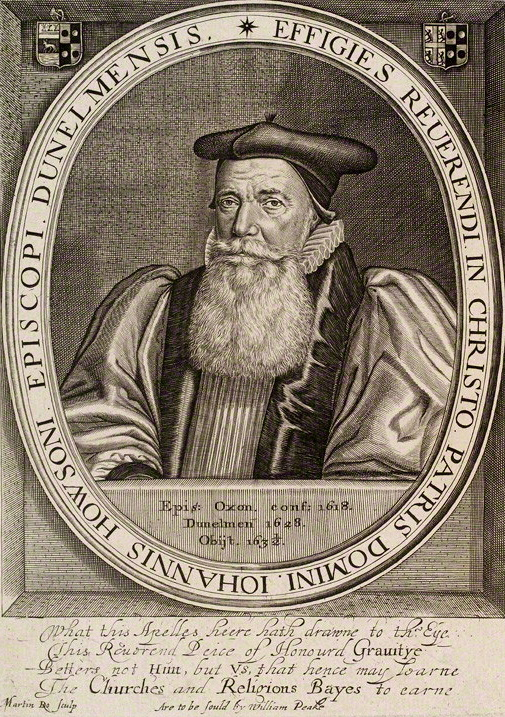
John Howson, engraving by Martin Droeshout

John Howson (c. 1557 – 6 February 1632) was an English academic and bishop.

== Life ==
He was born in the London parish of St Bride's Church, and educated at St Paul's School.

He was a student and then a canon of Christ Church, Oxford, and Vice-Chancellor in 1602. James I of England appointed him to Chelsea College. He became rector of Brightwell Baldwin in 1608.

Conflicts in Oxford with Calvinist clergy led to his being accused in 1615 before the King of popery, by George Abbot, Archbishop of Canterbury. He was able to convince the King that the charges were misplaced, and began to rise in the hierarchy, where he was an influence on the Arminian side. He was Bishop of Oxford from 1619, and Bishop of Durham from his translation there in September 1628.

He was buried in Old St Paul's Cathedral in London, but the grave and monument were destroyed in the Great Fire of London in 1666. His name appears on a modern monument in the crypt, listing important graves lost in the fire.

== Works ==
- Remarriage Be Not Permitted After Adultery (1602)
- Certain sermons made in Oxford, anno Dom, 1616 (1622)

== Family ==
His daughter Anne married Thomas Farnaby.

Church of England titles
Preceded by John Bridges	Bishop of Oxford; 1619–1628	Succeeded by Richard Corbet
Preceded by George Montaigne	Bishop of Durham; 1628–1632	Succeeded by Thomas Morton
Political offices
Vacant Title last held by Richard Neile	Lord Lieutenant of Durham; 1628–1632	Succeeded by Thomas Morton
