= Vice-chancellor =

Head or chief executive of a university

A vice-chancellor (commonly called a VC) serves as the chief executive of a university in the United Kingdom, New Zealand, Australia, Nepal, India, Bangladesh, Malaysia, Nigeria, Pakistan, Sri Lanka, South Africa, Kenya, other Commonwealth countries, and some universities in Hong Kong. In Scotland, Canada, and the Republic of Ireland, the chief executive of a university is usually called a principal or (especially in the Republic of Ireland) a president, with vice-chancellor being an honorific associated with this title, allowing the individual to bestow degrees in the absence of the chancellor. In Northern Ireland, a vice-chancellor of a university also usually has the subsidiary titles of either president or principal; the title is vice-chancellor and president at The Queen's University of Belfast.

The role of the VC contrasts with that of the chancellor, who is usually a prominent public figure who acts as a ceremonial figurehead only (e.g., the chancellor of the University of Cambridge for 36 years was Prince Philip), while the vice-chancellor is the chief executive. An assistant to a vice-chancellor is called a pro-vice-chancellor or deputy vice-chancellor; these were traditionally academics who were elected to take on additional responsibilities in addition to their regular teaching and research for a limited time, but are now increasingly commonly full-time appointments. In some universities (e.g. in Australian universities: Deakin University, Macquarie University), there are several deputy vice-chancellors subordinate to the vice-chancellor, with pro-vice-chancellor being a position at executive level ranking below deputy vice-chancellor.

The Vice-Chancellor is also the name or former name given to certain judges in common law jurisdictions.

== Vice-chancellor by countries ==
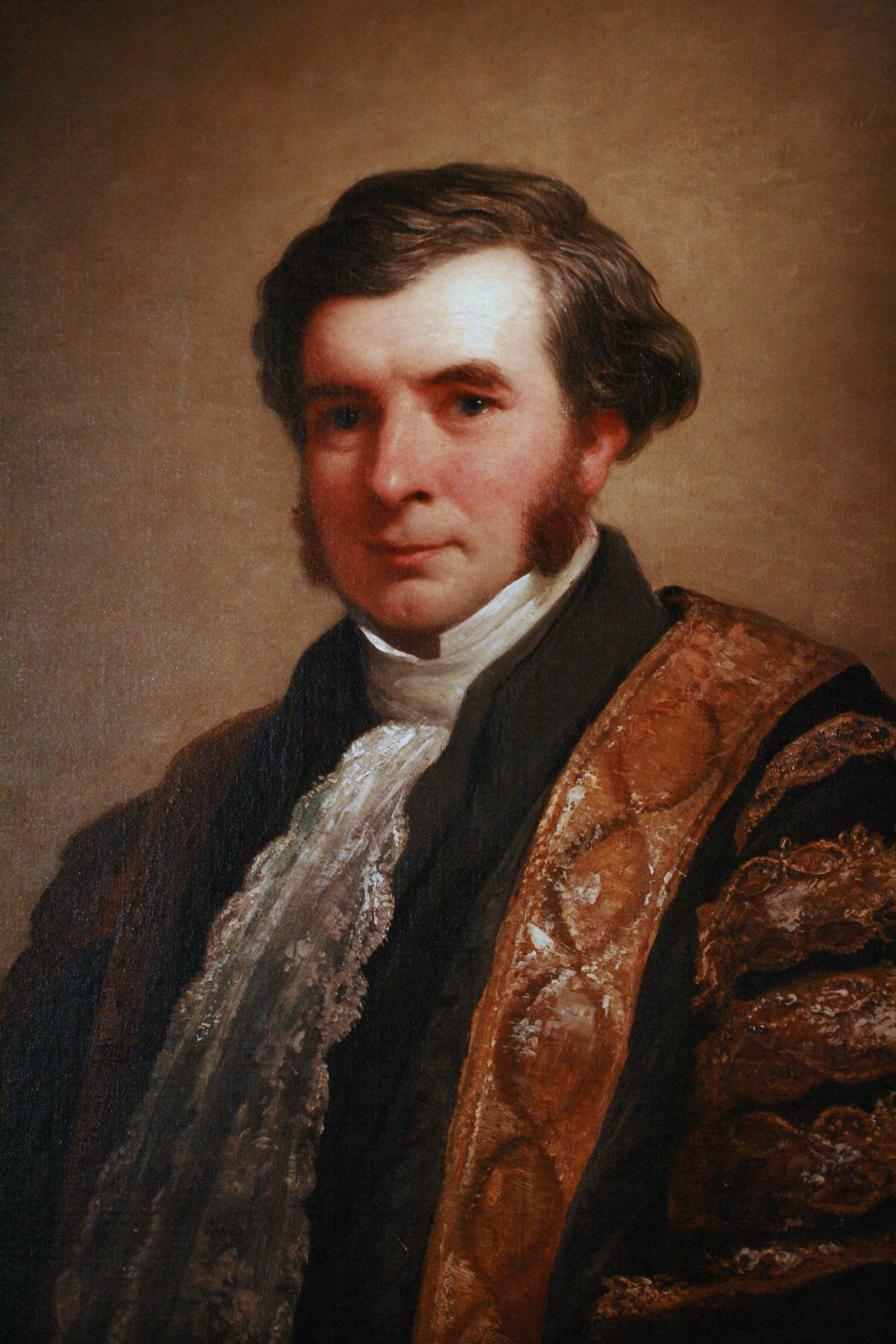
Sir Charles Nicholson, the first vice-chancellor of the University of Sydney, c. 1850

=== Australia ===
The executive head of an Australian university is the vice-chancellor, who serves as the university equivalent of a chief executive officer. The vice-chancellor is responsible for the day-to-day operations of the university and reports directly to the University Council, which the chancellor heads. Assisting the vice-chancellor, the roles of deputy vice-chancellors and pro vice-chancellors have emerged to better manage the administrative overhead of the position.

=== Canada and Scotland ===
Canadian university vice-chancellors almost always carry the title of "president (or equivalent) and vice-chancellor"; likewise, in Scotland, they hold the position of "principal and vice-chancellor" (as do a few Canadian universities such as Queen's University and the Royal Military College of Canada). In the Scottish practice, the one individual may have two sets of official robes, reflecting a continuing division of responsibilities between the two posts. The vice-chancellor's robes, therefore, should not be worn in the presence of the chancellor but should only be worn when deputizing for the chancellor.

=== England, Wales and Northern Ireland ===
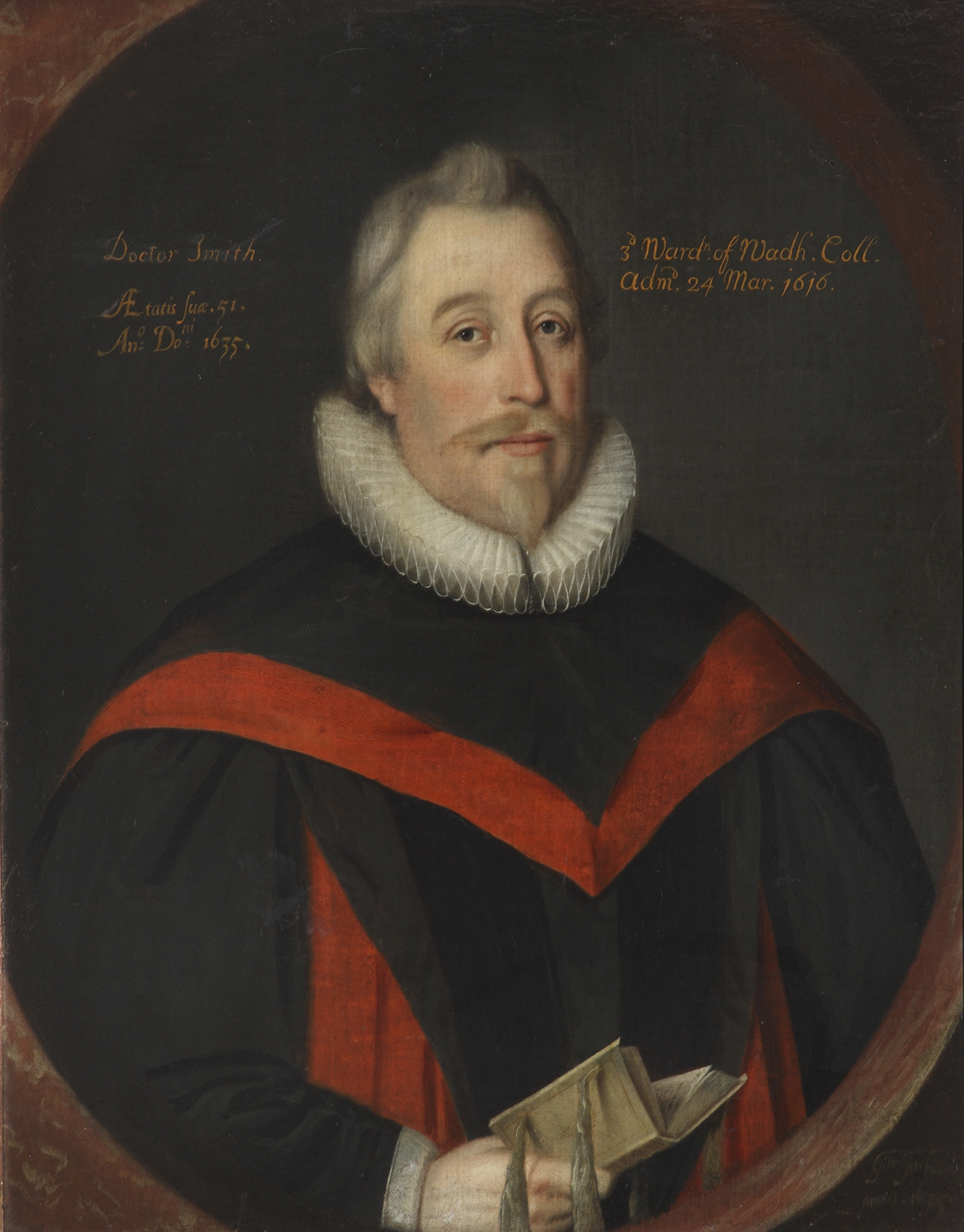
William Smyth, Vice-Chancellor of the University of Oxford; painting by Gilbert Jackson

Almost all chief executives of institutions with university status in England, Wales and Northern Ireland use vice-chancellor in their title. Additional titles are sometimes used alongside vice-chancellor in England and Wales. Most of these involve the use of either "president and vice-chancellor" or "vice-chancellor and president", and have arisen in the 21st century, although the title of the chief executive of Durham University as "vice-chancellor and warden" dates back to 1937 (and refers back to the use of "warden" as the title of the chief executive of the university from its foundation to 1909). The full titles of the vice-chancellors of Oxford and Cambridge universities, used only in formal address, are "the Reverend the Vice-Chancellor" and "the Right Worshipful the Vice-Chancellor", respectively.

Some examples of the use of "president" alongside "vice-chancellor" include the University of Manchester (in England), where the statutes define the title of the chief executive officer of the university as "President and Vice-Chancellor", Queen's University Belfast (in Northern Ireland) and Cardiff University (in Wales).

The chief executives of some member institutions of the University of London that are also universities in their own right also use the title vice-chancellor, e.g. Birkbeck and the London School of Economics (as "president and vice-chancellor")

Some institutions without university status also use "vice chancellor" in the title of their head, such as the Walbrook Institute London, which uses "Vice-Chancellor and Chief Executive Officer".

=== India ===
In India, most central and state level universities have a titular head called chancellor who is either the President of India or an eminent person appointed by the Government of India (in central universities) or state governors (in state universities). The de facto head of a university is the vice-chancellor, the highest paid official of the university. Next in command are more than one pro-vice-chancellor in charge of academic as well as administrative and financial affairs. In deemed universities and institutes of national importance, the head of the institution is either called director general or director, the latter designation being more commonly used in academic terms in the subcontinent. Among the State Universities, The state ministers are de-facto pro-vice-chancellors of universities of professional Importance. Eg. The State Minister for Medical and Health Care will be the de-facto pro-vice-chancellor of the state medical university.

=== Bangladesh ===
The President of Bangladesh is the titular chancellor of all universities in Bangladesh, public or private. The vice chancellor is the executive head, and his/her deputy, the pro-vice chancellor holds a full-time administrative office.

=== Nepal ===
The Prime Minister of Nepal is the titular chancellor of most universities in Nepal, public or private. The vice chancellor is the executive head, and along with Registrar holds a full-time administrative office.

=== Sri Lanka ===
In Sri Lanka, all the government universities are administered by the vice-chancellor.

=== Sudan ===
In Sudan and South Sudan, universities are administered by the vice-chancellor.

=== Kenya ===
In Kenya, chancellors are titular heads of public universities, either appointed by the head of state (president) directly, or, in newly introduced legislation, at the recommendation of senate and alumni of the university. The day-to-day running of universities is the responsibility of the vice-chancellors. "Rector" and "president" are not commonly used terms in university administration. The vice-chancellor is assisted by a number of high ranking University officials known as Deputy Vice-chancellor, popularly referred to as DVC. The DVC's head specific departments of the university such as Finance and Administration, etc.

=== Malaysia ===
In Malaysia, all the government universities (with the sole exception of International Islamic University Malaysia, which was administered by the rector) are administered by the vice-chancellor.

=== Nigeria ===
In Nigeria, chancellors are ceremonial heads of public universities (mostly traditional monarchs), appointed by the head of state (president), governor of a state (in the case of state-owned universities) or assumed by the owner of a private university. The day-to-day running of universities is the responsibility of the vice-chancellors. There are also pro-chancellors who are government appointees that head the universities' governing councils. The university governing council is the highest administrative organ of a Nigerian public universities. They approve projects, contracts, recruitments, promotions and are regarded as employer of university workers. They also appoint the principal officers of the university including the vice chancellor. They exercise all these functions on behalf of the "visitor." The visitor is the president of the federation (for federal universities) and state governors for state-owned universities.

=== Ireland ===
In Ireland, day-to-day operations of the universities are under the directorship of a president (a provost in the case of Trinity College Dublin). However, the president of each constituent university of the National University of Ireland also has the title of pro-vice-chancellor of the NUI.

=== Philippines ===
In the University of Santo Tomas, neither the chancellor nor the vice-chancellor are the day-to-day head of the university. The chief executive officer of the university is the rector. The vice-chancellor position is held ex officio by the Prior Provincial of the Dominican Province of the Philippines, the Dominican province that has majority control over the university. The Master of the Order of Preachers (the leader of the Dominican Order) is ex officio the chancellor of the university.

In the University of the Philippines, the chancellor assigns different vice-chancellors to handle different aspects of running the university. There is one for instruction, administration, and community affairs, among others.

=== Sweden ===
In Sweden, the rektor (rector) is the head of a Swedish university, but the word vice-chancellor (vicekansler) is often used as the English translation of rektor. The vice-chancellor (vicekansler) is also an honorary title given to the rectores magnifici at the universities of Lund and Uppsala.

University chancellor (universitetskansler) is the office of the highest civil servant in the Swedish university system.

=== United States ===
In the United States, a vice chancellor (typically spelled without a hyphen) is an assistant to a chancellor, who is generally the (actual, not merely ceremonial) head of one campus of a large university which has several campuses. The head of the entire university is the president (the equivalent of a Commonwealth vice-chancellor), the chancellor is in charge of one campus, and a vice chancellor is one of their direct reports responsible for a broad area of authority at one campus. Some systems, such as the California State University and the Pennsylvania State System of Higher Education invert this arrangement so that the chancellor is the head of the entire university system, while a vice chancellor is an executive who directly reports to the chancellor and is responsible for a broad area of authority across the entire system.

At the University of the South, the vice chancellor is the administrative head of the university (as well as mayor of the unincorporated town of Sewanee). The chancellor is a bishop of one of the 28 southeastern Episcopal dioceses that own the university and is elected by the members of the board of trustees. The chancellor neither resides at the university nor holds administrative power; the office of chancellor is a ceremonial one.
