= William Brough (priest) =

English royalist churchman

William Brough (died 1671) was an English royalist churchman, Dean of Gloucester from 1643.

== Life ==
He was educated at Christ's College, Cambridge, where he matriculated in 1613, graduating B.A. 1617 and M.A. 1620. He proceeded B.D. 1627, and D.D. 5 February 1636. He was presented to the rectory of St. Michael, Cornhill, from 1625.

Brough was a supporter of William Laud and his Arminian views, was made chaplain to the king, and was installed canon of Windsor, 1 February 1639. At the beginning of the First English Civil War, he was removed from his benefice by the parliamentary commission, and lost his home and possessions. Thomas Holl was intruded as rector. His wife died soon afterwards, and Brough joined the king at Oxford. On 16 August 1643 he was nominated dean of Gloucester, but was not installed till 20 November 1644. He returned to Oxford in 1645, and on 26 August of that year was created D.D. by the king's order.

Little is heard of him from this date to the Restoration. He then was reappointed to the deanery, and was rector of Bemerton. He died 5 July 1671, and was buried in St. George's Chapel, Windsor.

== Works ==
He was the author of The Holy Feasts and Fasts of the Church, with Meditations and Prayers proper for Sacraments and other occasions leading to Christian life and death, London 1657; and of Sacred Principles, Services, and Soliloquies; or a Manual of Devotion, 1659, 1671.
