= John Williams (archbishop of York) =

Archbishop of York from 1641 to 1646

The Most Reverend and Right Honourable John Williams
- Archbishop of York
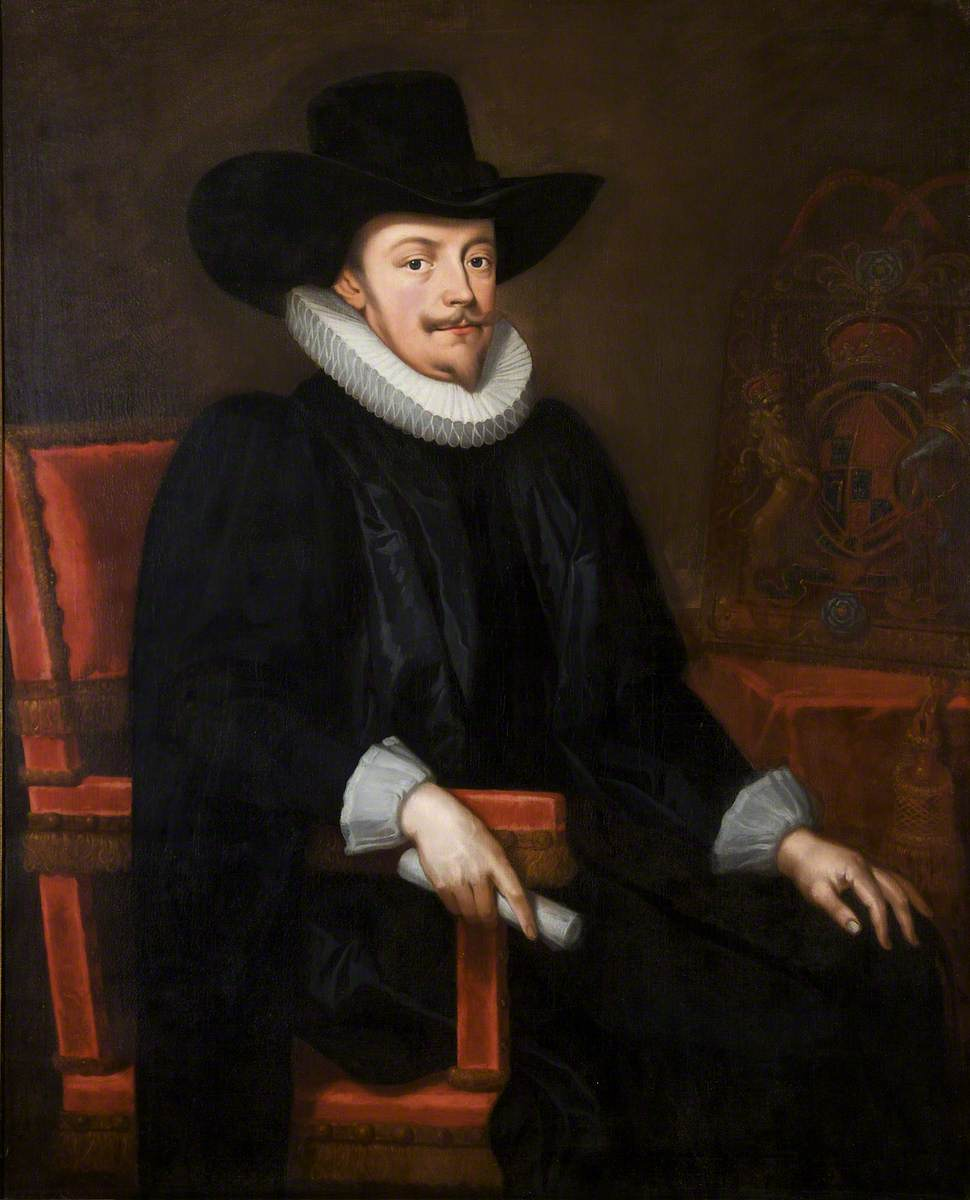
- Portrait by Gilbert Jackson
- Installed: 1641
- Term ended: 1646 (episcopacy abolished)
- Predecessor: Richard Neile
- Successor: Accepted Frewen (1660)
- Other post: Bishop of Lincoln (1621–1641)

Personal details
- Born: 22 March 1582 Parlwr Mawr, Conwy, Caernarfonshire, Wales
- Died: 25 March 1650 (aged 68) Gloddaeth Hall, Llandudno, Caernarfonshire, Wales
- Buried: Llandygai Church
- Denomination: Anglicanism
- Education: Ruthin School
- Alma mater: St John's College, Cambridge

John Williams (22 March 1582 – 25 March 1650) was a Welsh clergyman and political advisor to King James I. He served as Dean of Westminster 1620–1644, Bishop of Lincoln 1621–1641, Lord Keeper of the Great Seal 1621–1625, and Archbishop of York 1641–1646. He was the last bishop to serve as lord chancellor.

== Early life ==
John Williams, Bishop of Lincoln, and later Archbishop of York, was born in Conwy, Wales, the second son of Edmund Williams and Mary Wynn. At a time when many bishops came from rather humble backgrounds, Williams prided himself on belonging to an "ancient family". He attended Ruthin School before graduating from St John's College, Cambridge BA 1601, MA 1605, BD 1613, and DD 1616. He became a fellow in 1603 and was a University Proctor in 1611–12. He entered the clergy and he first impressed the king with a sermon he preached in 1610. He became the king's chaplain in 1617.

== Political career ==
In 1620 he was made Dean of Westminster and was swiftly elevated by King James I to the Bishopric of Lincoln in 1621, as well as being made Lord Keeper of the Great Seal. Throughout his political career, Williams was identified as a strong supporter of King James, who, it has been said, valued him as a man "who knew his mind and would do his bidding" and with whom personally he had much in common. He alienated the Prince of Wales, the future Charles I by disapproving of his ill-fated expedition with the Duke of Buckingham to Madrid. When James I died and was succeeded by Charles I in 1625, Williams was quickly removed from the office of Lord Chancellor, and was prevented from attending Parliament. Though Williams managed to survive Buckingham, who was assassinated in 1628, he remained out of favour; he incurred the enmity of William Laud, Archbishop of Canterbury from 1633 and his powerful ally Thomas Wentworth, 1st Earl of Strafford, both of whom had great influence with Charles I.

Williams's liberal attitudes toward the Puritans led to a legal battle with the Court of the Star Chamber. Laud's biographer refers to the original charge against him, of revealing State secrets, as frivolous; but Williams, in his efforts to clear himself, laid himself open to a charge of subornation of perjury, which was proved, and he was suspended from his benefices in 1636, fined, and imprisoned in the Tower of London until 1640. Laud had assumed that the conviction would force Williams' resignation as Bishop of Lincoln; but to his fury, Williams refused to resign and no machinery existed to remove him. Until his imprisonment, Williams remained defiantly at his episcopal palace, Buckden, lavishing hospitality on his neighbours.

=== Loyalties: Cromwell or King Charles I ===
In 1640 the Lords forced the King to release him, and Williams resumed his offices and tried to steer a course between the extreme wings of the Church. He showed little pity for either Laud or Strafford, supporting the impeachment of both men. In the case of Laud, there is no evidence that he approved of Laud's eventual execution; but it was otherwise with Strafford. He fatally weakened Strafford's cause in the House of Lords by arguing successfully that the bishops should absent themselves in cases involving the death penalty, and later specifically urged the King not to spare Strafford's life, arguing that in his public role he was discharged from his private promise to that effect. He was re-imprisoned by Parliament in 1641, but was released on bail in 1642 and went to be with the King in Yorkshire, as well as be enthroned as Archbishop of York, a position to which he had been appointed the previous year.

1646 would see Williams change sides and decide to support the Parliamentarians as evident in the attack on Conwy Castle. His stay in Yorkshire was brief, and he spent the last years of his life in his native north Wales, initially supporting the royalist cause, but eventually coming to an accommodation with the local parliamentarian commander in 1646. He was deprived of his See by Parliament on 9 October 1646, as episcopacy was abolished for the duration of the Commonwealth and the Protectorate. Always on speaking terms with Oliver Cromwell, Williams wrote to him after the attacks on Conwy requesting the return of landowners' goods and that the troops be removed from Conwy as they were eating too much! While the request was granted by Cromwell, Williams was viewed by some as a traitor for his actions during the English Civil War. Williams had been convinced that the King's cause was lost and consequently negotiated with Parliamentary forces, even participating in the battle at Conwy. He was, however, deeply affected by the execution of the monarch in 1649.

== Death and legacy ==
Williams died of quinsy in 1650 at Gloddaeth Hall in Llandudno, held by the Royalist Mostyn family, and was interred at the parish church of Llandygai. He had repurchased the family estate, which passed to his nephew Sir Griffith Williams. Through his niece Elizabeth Dolben he was the grand-uncle of a later Archbishop of York, John Dolben.

Details of Williams' Civil War activities in North Wales are contained in Norman Tucker's book Prelate at Arms (Llandudno, 1937). He is also the central character in Tucker's fictional work Castle of Care, (London 1937) as well as playing a significant role in one of Tucker's later novels, Restless we roam (London 1950).

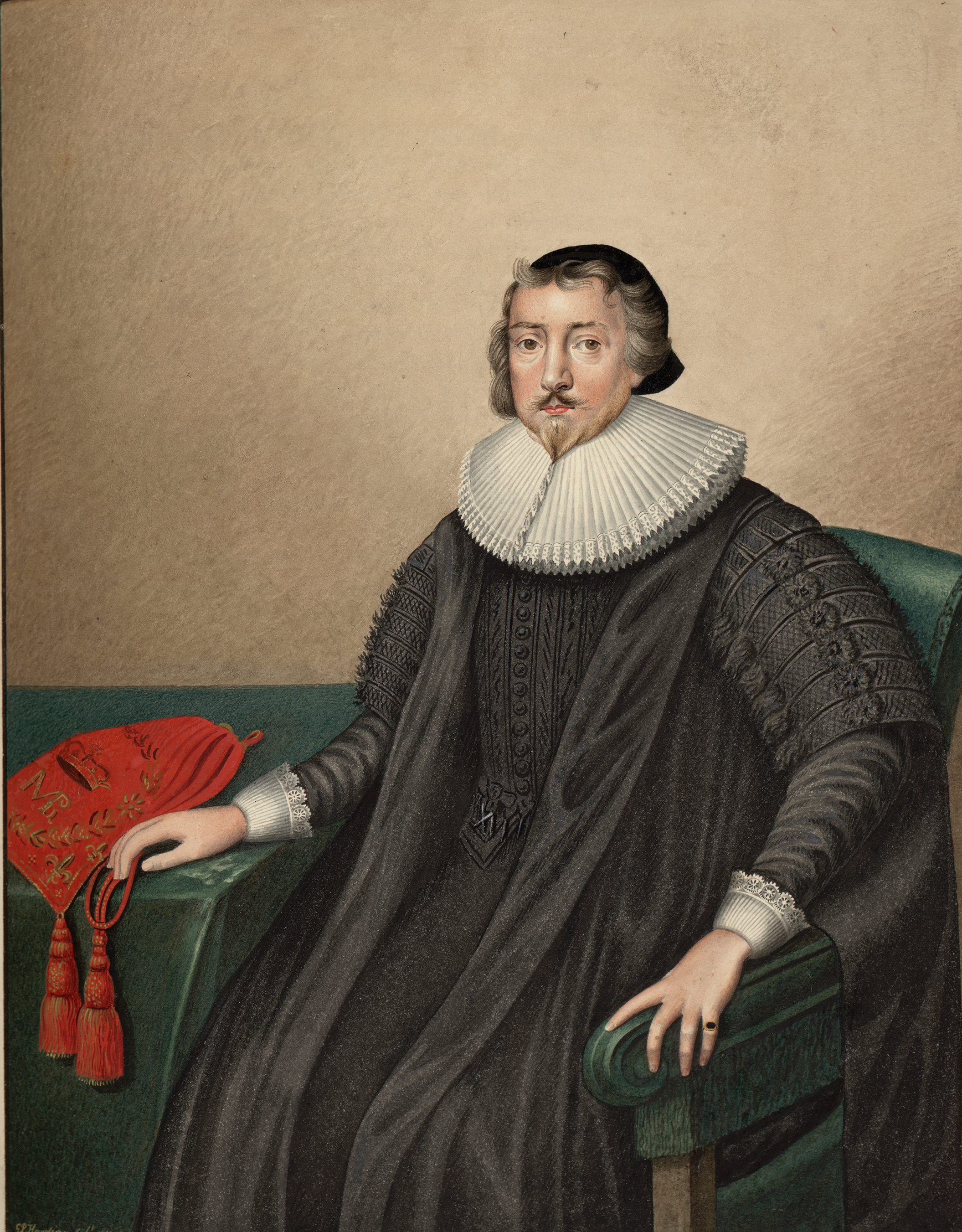
18th-century copy of a portrait of Archbishop John Williams

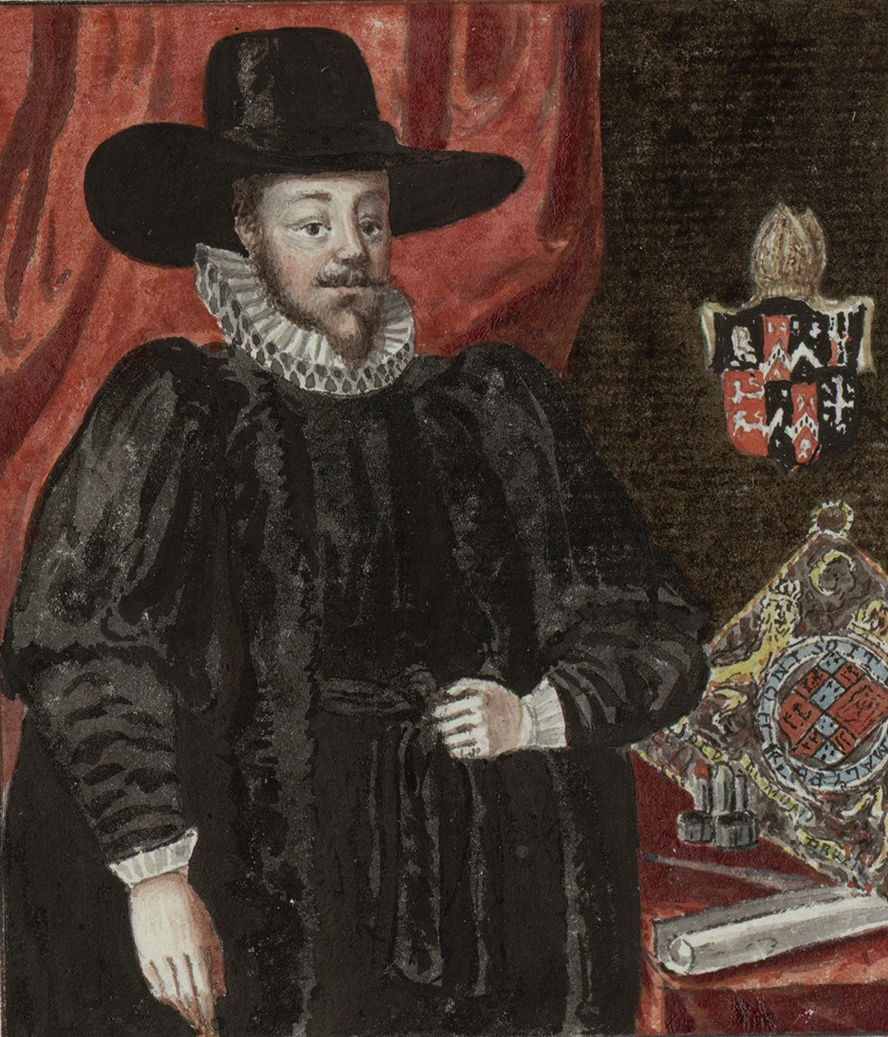
John Williams, from A Tour in Wales by Thomas Pennant (1726-1798) that chronicle the three journeys he made through Wales between 1773 and 1776

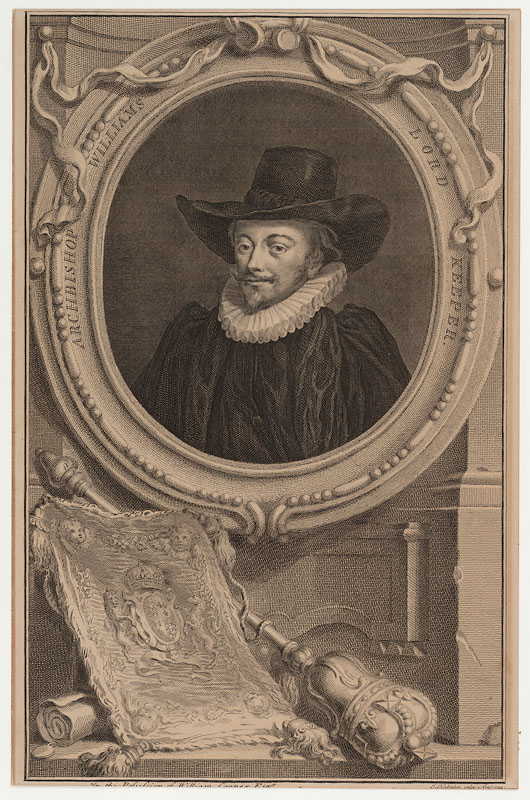
John Williams by Jacobus Houbraken, 1742

== Books ==
- Ashbee, Jeremy (2007). Conwy Castle. Cardiff, UK: Cadw. ISBN 978-1-85760-259-3.
- Ashbee, Jeremy (2010). "The King's Accommodation at his Castles". In Williams, Diane; Kenyon, John (eds.). The Impact of Edwardian Castles in Wales. Oxford, UK: Oxbow Books. pp. 72–84. ISBN 978-1-84217-380-0.

== Arms ==
Coat of arms of John Williams

Notes
While serving as a bishop Williams's arms would be displayed impaled with the arms of the diocese and topped by a mitre.
Escutcheon
Gules a chevron Ermine between three men’s heads in profile couped Argent.

Political offices
| In commission Title last held by The Lord Verulam | Lord Keeper of the Great Seal; 1621–1625 | Succeeded by Sir Thomas Coventry |
Church of England titles
| Preceded by George Montaigne | Bishop of Lincoln; 1621–1641 | Succeeded by Thomas Winniffe |
| Preceded by Richard Neile | Archbishop of York; 1641–1646 | Vacant Title next held by Accepted Frewen |
