= Bill Jennings (Australian footballer) =

Australian rules footballer

Personal information
- Full name: William Maurice Jennings
- Born: 17 November 1879; Ballarat, Victoria
- Died: 27 February 1943 (aged 63); Malvern, Victoria

Playing career^{1}
Years	Club	Games (Goals)
1902	St Kilda	2 (0)
- ^{1} Playing statistics correct to the end of 1902.

William Maurice Jennings (17 November 1879 – 27 February 1943) was an Australian rules footballer who played with St Kilda in the Victorian Football League (VFL).

Bill Jennings died in 1943 and is buried at Burwood Cemetery.
