= Gloucester Theological College =

Former Anglican theological college

Gloucester Theological College (1868–1897) was an Anglican theological college for the Diocese of Gloucester and Bristol in Gloucestershire, England.

== History ==
The college was established in 1868 (formally opened in 1869) by Charles Ellicott, Bishop of Gloucester and Bristol. It closed in 1897, the year that the Diocese of Gloucester was separated from the Diocese of Bristol.

The college was an affiliated college of Durham University. The college had an academic hood of a full shape black stuff with the cape edged with puce-coloured satin.

== Notable staff ==
- Edward Scobell, who was a lecturer at the college from 1877 to 1881.
- Donald Spence Jones, Principal, 1875–77.

== Notable alumni ==
- Alfred Alston, hymnwriter.
