= Theophilus Higgons =

Theophilus Higgons (c.1578–1659) was an English Anglican divine and convert to (and from) Catholicism.

== Life ==
The son of Robert Higgons, he was born at Chilton, near Brill, Buckinghamshire, and was educated partly in the free school at Thame in Oxfordshire. In November 1592 he became a student of Christ Church, Oxford, at the age of 14. He proceeded B.A. 20 October 1597, and M.A. 4 June 1600.

Higgons was inclined to Puritanism, and while censor at Christ Church he sawed down the maypole. On the promotion of Thomas Ravis, Dean of Christ Church, as Bishop of Gloucester (17 March 1605), Higgons became his domestic chaplain, continuing with him till Ravis' translation to London (2 June 1607), when he became lecturer at St Dunstan Fleet Street, and was popular as preacher.

After he had been established at St Dunstan for some time, Higgons married. He did so practically in secret, and his congregation disliked what he had done. He therefore left his wife and went into the North of England.

Higgons became discontented; and was converted to Roman Catholicism, probably by John Floyd. He went to France and spent two years at Douai and the College of St. Omer, where his father went to try to bring him to Protestantism. He took the pseudonym Thomas Forster. He went on to Rouen, where he lived for some time; but he found no preferment as a Catholic.

Higgons was reconverted to Protestantism by Thomas Morton, who had replied to one of his books. He then became rector of Hunton, Kent, near Maidstone. During the First English Civil War his living was sequestered, and he was taken into the house of a Daniel Collins of Maidstone. He died there in 1659 and was buried in Maidstone churchyard.

== Works ==
- ‘A Scholastical Examination of Man's Iniquity and God's Justice,’ 1608.
- ‘Apology, refuting Sir E. Hoby's Letter,’ &c., Rouen, 1609.
- ‘The First Motive to suspect the Integrity of his Religion, with an Appendix against Dr. Field, Dr. Humfrey, &c.,’ 1609. Under his Catholic pen name of Thomas Forster.
- ‘Sermon at St. Paul's Cross,’ 1610.
- ‘Reasons proving the lawfulness of the Oath of Allegiance,’ 1611.
- ‘Sermon on Ephesians ii. 4–7,’ London, 1611.
- ‘Mystical Babylon, or a Treatise on Apoc. xxiii. 2,’ London, 1624.
- ‘A Miscellany of divers remarkable Passages and Practices of Master Freeman, by T. H., rector of Hunton,’ 1655 (appended to Robert Boreman's Mirrour of Mercy and Judgment).
