= Thomas Frewen (physician) =

English physician

Thomas Frewen, M.D. (1704–1791), was an English physician.

== Career and works ==
He practised as a surgeon and apothecary at Rye, Sussex, and afterwards as a physician at Lewes, having obtained the M.D. degree previous to 1755. He became known as one of the first in England to adopt the practice of inoculation against smallpox. In his essay on The Practice and Theory of Inoculation he narrates his experience in three hundred and fifty cases, only one having died by the smallpox so induced. The common sort of people, he says, were averse to inoculation, and "disputed about the lawfulness of propagating diseases"—the very ground on which smallpox inoculation (variolation) was made illegal in 1840. "The more refined studies of our speculative adepts in philosophy", he says, "have let them into the secret that the small-pox and many other diseases are propagated by means of animalcula hatched from eggs lodged in the hairs, pores, &c. of human bodies".

In the year of 1759, he published another short essay on smallpox, Reasons against an opinion that a person infected with the Small-pox may be cured by Antidote without incurring the Distemper. The opinion was that of Boerhaave, Cheyne, and others, that the development of smallpox after exposure to infection could be checked by a timely use of the æthiops mineral. Frewen's argument was that many persons ordinarily escape smallpox "who had been supposed to be in the greatest danger of taking it", and that the æthiops mineral was irrelevant. His other work, Physiologia (Lond. 1780), is a considerable treatise applying the doctrines of Boerhaave to some diseases. One of his principles is: "Wherever nature has fixed a pleasure, we may take it for granted she there enjoins a duty; and something is to be done either for the individual or for the species".

He died at Northiam in Sussex, on 14 June 1791, aged 86.
