= John Frewen (divine) =

English Puritan divine

John Frewen (1558–1628) was an English Puritan divine.

== Life ==
Frewen was descended from an old Worcestershire family. He is stated to have been baptised on 1 July 1560. His grandfather, Roger Frewen, and his father, Richard Frewen, were both possessed of property in Hill Croome and Earls Croome in Worcestershire. He was ordained priest by Bullingham, bishop of Gloucester, 24 June 1582, and in November of the following year was presented by his father to the rectory of Northiam, Sussex. On his becoming resident at Northiam it is supposed that Frewen occupied a house known as ‘Carriers,’ situated about two hundred yards south of the present rectory-house, and then the property of his friend and neighbour, John White of Brickwall. In 1593 Frewen bought the Church House at Northiam, where he and his descendants continued to reside until their purchase of Brickwall; Church House remained in the family.

Frewen's uncompromising puritanism brought him at length into collision with some of his chief parishioners. At the Lewes summer assizes in 1611 they preferred a bill of indictment against him for nonconformity, but the grand jury ignored the bill. Frewen's persecutors still continued to annoy him, and he appealed to the ecclesiastical court at Lewes, 30 July 1622, when it was deposed that one Robert Cresswell of Northiam, ‘gentleman,’ had on 26 June 1621, on the open highway, insulted the rector, ‘calling him old Fole, old Asse, old Coxscombe.’ Cresswell was, after due citation, excommunicated.

On 1 June 1627, ‘being aged and weake in bodie,’ he made his will. He died towards the end of April 1628, and was buried in the chancel of his own church on the following 2 May.

== Works ==
His first publication was ‘Certaine Fruitfull Instructions and necessary doctrines meete to edify in the feare of God: faithfully gathered together by Iohn Frewen,’ London, 1587. It was dedicated to Thomas Coventry, father of the lord keeper. Two years later Frewen published another manual with the title ‘Certaine Fruitfull Instructions for the generall cause of Reformation against the slanders of the Pope and League,’ London, 1589.

In 1598 he edited, and wrote the preface to, a pamphlet of eighty-eight pages, entitled ‘A Courteous Conference with the English Catholickes Romane, about the six articles ministered unto the Seminarie Priests,’ London. This treatise had been left in manuscript by John Bishop, a recusant papist, a native of Battle, Sussex. Its design is to show the unlawfulness of revolting from the authority of the civil magistrate on account of religion.

Frewen vindicated himself against his parishioners in sermons, published as ‘Certaine Sermons on the 2, 3, 4, 5, 6, 7, and 8 verses of the Eleventh Chapter of S. Paule his Epistle to the Romanes. Preached in the parish church of Northiam, in the county of Sussex,’ London, 1612. Exactly two hundred and fifty years later Octavius Lord, the then rector of Northiam, a descendant in the female line of Frewen, ‘re-preached’ them by request on eight successive Sundays in the same pulpit. In 1621 Frewen published his ‘Certaine choise grounds and principles of our Christian Religion, … wherein the people of the parish of Northiam, in the county of Sussex, have been catechized and instructed for the settling of their hearts and mindes in the mysteries of Salvation,’ London. In addition to his published writings he left a large unfinished work in manuscript, entitled ‘Grounds and Principles of Christian Religion;’ it consisted of seven books, of which two only have been preserved.

In 1627 Frewen sat for his portrait to Marcus Gheeraerts the Younger, and the picture took its place among family portraits in the banqueting-room at Brickwall. ‘It is a half-length, and represents the old puritan in full canonicals, except that he wears a very broad-brimmed hat. His right hand rests upon a Geneva bible, open at 2 Kings, chapter xxiii.—a favourite passage with the puritans, as it describes Josiah's zeal for religious reformation; his left hand grasps a skull.’ It was engraved by Edward Scriven.

== Family ==
He was married three times. By his first wife, Eleanor, who died in 1606, he had six sons:

- Accepted (1588–1664);
- Thankfull (1591–1656), purse-bearer and secretary of petitions to Lord-keeper Coventry, who suffered for his loyalty during the civil war and Commonwealth (in his will he is described as ‘clerk of appeals and clerk of the crown in chancery’);
- John (1595–1654), his father's successor in the rectory of Northiam;
- Stephen of Brickwall, citizen of London, master of the Skinners' Company, and fined for alderman of Vintry Ward;
- Joseph;

and Mary, wife of John Bigg of Newcastle upon Tyne. In 1607 he married Helen Hunt, probably daughter of Richard Hunt of Brede, Sussex, and by her had:

- Benjamin, citizen of London;
- Thomas, a captain in Cromwell's army for invading Ireland, and founder of the family at Castle Connel, near Limerick; and Samuel.

The second Mrs. Frewen died in 1616, and Frewen married, on 29 July 1619 at St. Antholin's, Budge Row, London, a third wife, Susan Burdon, who survived him many years.
