= Richard Vaughan (bishop) =

Welsh Church of England bishop (c. 1550–1607)

The Right Reverend Richard Vaughan
- Bishop of London
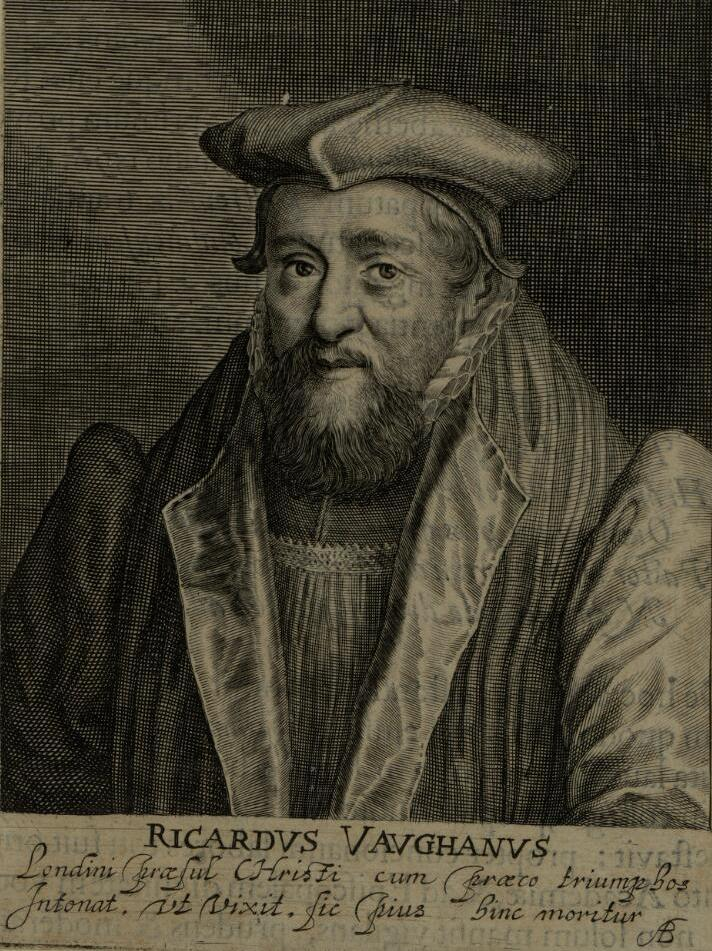
- De Passe engraving, 1620
- Church: Church of England
- Diocese: London
- Installed: 1604
- Term ended: 1607
- Predecessor: Richard Bancroft
- Successor: Thomas Ravis
- Other posts: Bishop of Bangor (1595–1597); Bishop of Chester (1597–1604)

Orders
- Ordination: c. 1578
- Consecration: c. 1595

Personal details
- Born: c. 1550 Llŷn, Caernarfonshire
- Died: 30 March 1607 London
- Buried: St Paul's Cathedral
- Parents: Thomas ap Robert Fychan
- Spouse: Jane Bower (m. 1581)
- Education: St John's College, Cambridge

Ordination history of Richard Vaughan
History
Episcopal consecration
- Principal consecrator: John Whitgift, Archbishop of Canterbury
- Co-consecrators: Richard Fletcher, Bishop of London; John Young, Bishop of Rochester

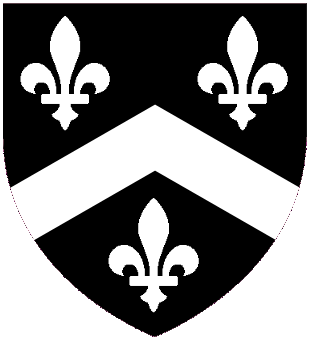
Arms: Sable a chevron between three fleur-de-lis Argent.

Richard Vaughan (c.1550 – 30 March 1607) was a Welsh bishop of the Church of England. He was educated at the University of Cambridge and became Bishop of London.

== Life ==
His father was Thomas ap Robert Fychan (English: Vaughan) of Llŷn, Caernarfonshire. His brother, Roger Vaughan bought Kinnersley Castle, and his son, John Vaughan was a Catholic. He was educated at St John's College, Cambridge, where he graduated BA in 1574, MA in 1577, and DD in 1589. He became chaplain to John Aylmer, Bishop of London, who is said to have been a relative.

Vaughan assisted William Morgan in his translation of the Bible into Welsh, published in 1588.

He was rector of Chipping Ongar from 1578 to 1580, and of Little Canfield in 1580; Archdeacon of Middlesex in 1588; rector of Great Dunmow and Moreton in 1592, and of Stanford Rivers in 1594. He became Bishop of Bangor in 1595, Bishop of Chester in 1597, was Bishop of London from 1604 to 1607.

His views were Calvinist, and he signed and is presumed to have had input into the Lambeth Articles of 1595. He licensed in 1606 the translation of the work Institutiones Theologicae of the Reformed theologian Guillaume Du Buc (Gulielmus Bucanus) of Lausanne, carried out by Robert Hill. As Bishop of London he was generally sympathetic to moderate Puritan clergy; but he did take action in suspending Stephen Egerton.

Church of England titles
Preceded by Hugh Bellot	Bishop of Bangor; 1595–1597	Succeeded by Henry Rowlands
Preceded by Hugh Bellot	Bishop of Chester; 1597–1604	Succeeded by George Lloyd
Preceded by Richard Bancroft	Bishop of London; 1604–1607	Succeeded by Thomas Ravis
