= Thomas Rundle =

English cleric

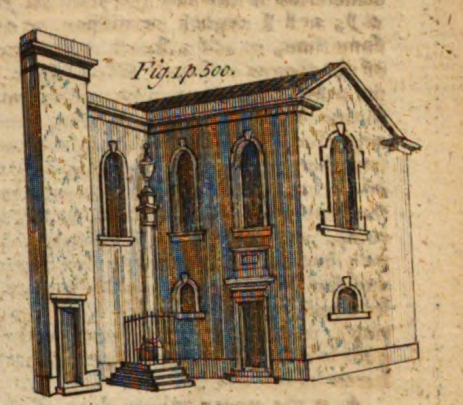
Bishop Thomas Rundle monument at St Peter's Church, Dublin taken from The Gentleman's Magazine in 1789.

Thomas Rundle (c.1688–1743) was an English cleric suspected of unorthodox views. He became Anglican bishop of Derry not long after a high-profile controversy had prevented his becoming bishop of Gloucester in 1733.

== Early life ==
He was born at Milton Abbot, Devon in 1688, son of Thomas Rundle, an Exeter clergyman. After Exeter grammar school under John Reynolds, he matriculated as a commoner at Exeter College, Oxford, on 5 April 1704, at the age of 16. He took the degree of B.C.L. in 1710.

In 1712, Rundle made the acquaintance of William Whiston, in Oxford for patristic study and to find support for his Society for Promoting Primitive Christianity. Rundle and his tutor Thomas Rennel were sympathetic, but thought Whiston would find no other local recruits. Rundle in the same year became tutor to the only son of John Cater of Kempston, near Bedford. Here Whiston visited him, and suggested a critical examination of the Sibylline oracles, which he didn't complete. Going to London, he attended Whiston's society, which held meetings from 3 July 1715 to 28 June 1717; but Thomas Emlyn found Rundle worldly. Rundle informed Whiston that he intended to take holy orders, which Whiston took badly; and became more a follower of Samuel Clarke.

== Priest ==
Rundle was ordained deacon on 29 July, and priest on 5 August 1716, by William Talbot as bishop of Salisbury; his younger son Edward had been Rundle's close friend since Oxford days. Talbot made Rundle his domestic chaplain, and gave him a prebend of Salisbury Cathedral. Rundle became vicar of Inglesham, Wiltshire, in 1719, and rector of Poulshot, Wiltshire, in 1720, both livings being in the bishop's gift. Talbot appointed him archdeacon of Wilts (1720), and treasurer of Sarum (1721).

At Salisbury, Rundle came to know Thomas Chubb well; they had perhaps met through Whiston. He praised the common sense of Chubb's publications, to 1730. Edward Talbot had died in December 1720, but his family continued to support Rundle. Talbot became bishop of Durham, and collated him to a stall in the cathedral (23 January 1722), giving him also the vicarage (1722) and rectory (1724) of Sedgefield, and appointing him (1728) to the mastership of Sherburn Hospital. He lived at the bishop's palace as resident chaplain from September 1722 till Bishop Talbot's death on 10 October 1730, Thomas Secker being his fellow chaplain from 1722 to 1724. On 5 July 1723, he proceeded D.C.L. at Oxford.

== Bishopric controversy ==
In December 1733, the see of Gloucester became vacant after the death of Elias Sydall. Rundle was nominated as his successor by Charles Talbot, 1st Baron Talbot as Lord Chancellor (Bishop Talbot's eldest son) who had made him his chaplain. The appointment was announced, but Edmund Gibson, bishop of London, intervened.

Rundle was attacked for his good relations with Chubb, and was called a deist, but less openly the real objection was to Rundle's church politics. Gibson's ally Richard Venn, rector of St. Antholin's, London, reported a conversation between Rundle and Robert Cannon, who was noted for light-hearted sceptical remarks. Rundle was defended by Arthur Ashley Sykes and John Conybeare, and was known to have preached against deists, and debated against Matthew Tindal and Anthony Collins in the Grecian coffee-house.

The issue was eventually compromised: the see of Gloucester went to Martin Benson, a friend of Rundle, while Rundle himself was unpopularly appointed to Derry, more of a rich sinecure. On 3 August 1735 he was consecrated by Hugh Boulter, Arthur Price and Josiah Hort.

He lived mainly in Dublin.

At the trial of Henry Barry, 4th Baron Barry of Santry, for the murder of Laughlin Murphy, a tavern barman, in 1739, Rundle as a Lords Spiritual was entitled to be an observer the trial, but according to an ancient tradition he was not entitled to participate in the verdict. He took a keen interest in the proceedings, praising the prosecution counsel highly, while deploring the weakness of the defence's legal team. Lord Santry was found guilty and sentenced to death, but King George II, with evident reluctance, was eventually persuaded to pardon him.

== Death ==
Rundle died unmarried at his house on Williams Street, Dublin on 14 April 1743, leaving most of his fortune of £20,000 to John Talbot.

He was buried in St. Peter's Church, Aungier Street, Dublin and a monument was constructed to mark the place of his burial.

== Works ==
Rundle published four single sermons (1718–36). His Letters … with Introductory Memoirs, Gloucester, 1789, 2 vols. (reprinted, Dublin, same year), were edited by James Dallaway. Most of them are addressed to Barbara (1685–1746), daughter of Sir Richard Kyrle, governor of South Carolina, and widow of William Sandys (1677–1712) of Miserden, Gloucestershire.

== Notes ==
Attribution

This article incorporates text from a publication now in the public domain: Lee, Sidney, ed. (1897). "Rundle, Thomas". Dictionary of National Biography. Vol. 49. London: Smith, Elder & Co.
