= John Inett =

English cleric and church historian

John Inett (1647–1717) was an English cleric and church historian.

== Life ==
His father Richard Inett married into the Hungerford family of Down Ampney, Gloucestershire. He attended Bewdley grammar school, and then aged 14 went to University College, Oxford, in 1661. He matriculated there on 17 July 1663, graduating B.A. in 1666 and M.A. in 1669. He was ordained deacon by William Nicholson, the Bishop of Gloucester on 22 September 1667, aged 20.

Inett was presented to the rectory of St Ebbe's Church, Oxford, where he made the acquaintance of Thomas Barlow, who recommended him to Sir Richard Newdigate, 1st Baronet. Newdigate had him presented by the Crown to the vicarage of Nuneaton, Warwickshire, in 1678, and Inett acted as Newdigate's chaplain at Arbury Hall, Warwickshire.

In February 1681 (N.S.) Bishop Barlow appointed Inett precentor of Lincoln Cathedral. In 1685 he was presented by the dean and chapter to the living of Tansor in Northamptonshire.

In 1700 Inett was appointed chaplain in ordinary to William III. He was incorporated member of St John's College, Cambridge, in 1701, and took the degree of D.D. in that university, to which he sent two of his sons. In 1706 he resigned the living of Tansor in favour of his son Richard, and took instead that of Clayworth, Nottinghamshire. In 1714 he was presented by the crown to the living of St Mary's Church, Wirksworth, Derbyshire.

Inett died in 1717, and a tablet was erected by his widow to his memory in Lincoln Cathedral.

== Works ==
On 1 August 1680 Inett preached an assize sermon at Warwick, which was published. It took a shrewd political line.

In 1688 Inett published a short book of devotions, Guide to the Devout Christian, to which he added a second part in 1692, Guide to Repentance. These books were popular; in 1764 were issued the sixteenth edition of the former and the tenth edition of the latter.

Inett's major work was his book Origines Anglicanæ, of which the first volume was published in London in 1704. His object in writing was to fill the gap between two substantial histories, Edward Stillingfleet's Origines Britannicæ and Gilbert Burnet's History of the Reformation. He took advice from White Kennett, and the first volume was well received if inaccurate; when the second volume was ready he made over the copyright to the Oxford University Press, who brought it out in 1710. The two volumes covered the history of the English church from 401 to 1216. It had a vogue in its own time, and was republished, edited by John Griffiths, Oxford, 1855; but was shortly superseded by Jeremy Collier's Ecclesiastical History.

Browne Willis used Inett's collections for his Survey of Lincoln Cathedral.

== Family ==
In 1680, Inett married Mary, daughter of the Rev. Richard Harrison, chancellor of Lichfield Cathedral, at Arbury.

== Notes ==
Attribution

This article incorporates text from a publication now in the public domain: Lee, Sidney, ed. (1891). "Inett, John". Dictionary of National Biography. Vol. 28. London: Smith, Elder & Co.
