= Nicholas Billingsley =

Nicholas Billingsley (baptised 1633 – 1709) was an English poet and cleric of the Church of England, on the outer margins of conformity.

== Life ==
He was born in Faversham, Kent, the son of Nicholas Billingsley, one of the masters of Faversham School and rector of Betteshanger, with the vicarage of Tilmanstone, from 1644 to 1661, and his wife Letitia Besbeche. He was educated at Eton College, c.1648 to 1654. He matriculated at Merton College, Oxford in 1657, graduating B.A. in 1658. Part of his poem Brachy-Martyrology is dated from Wickhambrook, Suffolk, 5 June 1657.

Billingsley was deprived of the living of Weobley in Herefordshire after the Act of Uniformity in 1662. He was a schoolmaster at Abergavenny until, through Sir Edward Harley, he was settled at Blakeney in the parish of Awre, Gloucestershire; the living was attached to a chapel of ease there in the village. He was offered the vicarage, but declined it on principle.

While Samuel Jordan was vicar of Awre, to about 1677, Billingsley as curate was left in peace: Jordan had been an undergraduate at Christ Church, Oxford 1651–4, after the parliamentary visitation. But his successor Charles Chapman, were High Churchmen and hostile; and the new bishop of Gloucester in Robert Frampton in 1681 was bitterly opposed, as was his chancellor Richard Parsons.

Edmund Calamy gave an account of an incident in the street, after Parsons had disliked a sermon by Billingsley on clerical lifestyles, then pulled his hair and abused him. Billingsley had suspensions and penalties for lack of conformity, and made compromises on conventional clerical dress and liturgy from the Book of Common Prayer. An anonymous biographer of Frampton gave another side of the story: that "Billingsley was vile in the judgment of the most."

Edward Fowler succeeded Frampton as bishop in 1691, two years after Billingsley had separated from the Church of England, and was willing to take him back into the fold. But Billingsley did not return to Awre. He ministered to Dissenters at various places in Gloucestershire. He died at Bristol in December 1709.

== Works ==
Billingsley, in his Treasury of Divine Raptures, calls himself "a private chaplain to the muse." His books are:

- Brachy-Martyrologia; or a Breviary of all the greatest Persecutions which have befallen the Saints and People of God from the Creation to our Present Times: Paraphras'd by Nicholas Billingsley of Mert. Coll. Oxon., 1657. This work includes discussion of the voluntary martyrdom to which Billingsley referred his nonconformity with clerical dress and liturgy. Its biographical style follows that laid down by Samuel Clarke.
- Κοσμοβρεφία, or the Infancy of the World; with an Appendix of God's Resting, Eden's Garden, Man's Happiness before. Misery after, his Fall. Whereunto is added, the Praise of Nothing; Divine Ejaculations; the Four Ages of the World; the Birth of Christ; also a Century of Historical Applications; with a Taste of Poetical Fictions. Written some years since by N. B., then of Eaton School, and now published at the request of his Friends, 1658. The work has been characterised by genre as a verse "miniature mythography", and as juvenilia influenced by the Eton context. On the basis of internal evidence, it is taken that Billingsley wrote it during a bout of illness.
- Thesauro-Phulakion, a Treasury of Divine Raptures, consisting of Serious Observations, Pious Ejaculations, Select Epigrams, alphabetically rank'd and fill'd by a Private Chaplain to the illustrious and renowned Lady Urania, the Divine and Heavenly Muse, 1667. Various sub-title-pages are introduced and many dedications.

Richard Baxter had in his possession a manuscript written by Billingsley, entitled Theological Reflections on God's admirable Master-piece. Billingsley has been linked with Thomas Hall, as nonconformists writing in the waning tradition of an allegorized Ovid.

== Family ==
Billingsley married a daughter of Richard Hawes of Leintwardine, an ejected minister. The couple took up residence with him at Abergavenny; when they moved away, he came to live with them.

Billingsley left two sons: Richard, who died minister of Whitchurch, Hampshire, father of the Rev. Samuel Billingsley, and brother of Nicholas, minister of Ashwick, Somerset.
