= William Wyatt (scholar) =

English scholar

William Wyatt (1616 – 9 September 1685), was a scholar and friend of the cleric Jeremy Taylor.

== Life ==
Wyatt, son of William Wyat or Wyatt of ‘plebeian’ origin, was born at Todenham, near Moreton-in-the-Marsh, Gloucestershire, in 1616. He died in Nuneaton in the house of Sir Richard Newdigate on 9 Sept. 1685

== Education and relationship with Jeremy Taylor ==
Wyatt matriculated from St John's College, Oxford, on 16 March 1637–8, but was prevented by the outbreak of the civil war from taking his degree in arts. His diligence as a scholar appears to have been noted by Jeremy Taylor while at Oxford in 1642, and at the close of 1644 he joined Taylor in Wales as an assistant teacher at his school, called Newton Hall (Collegium Newtoniense), in the parish of Llanfihangel-Aberbythych, Carmarthenshire. He seems to have spent a portion of his time with Taylor's family at Golden Grove.

== Later life ==
Subsequently Wyatt, who was much sought after as a teacher, was tutor in a school at Evesham, and then assisted Dr. William Fuller (1608–1675) in a private school at Twickenham, Middlesex. By recommendation of the chancellor he was created B.D. at Oxford on 12 September 1661, and when Fuller became bishop of Lincoln he made Wyatt his chaplain. He obtained a prebend in Lincoln Cathedral by Fuller's favour (installed on 13 May 1668, "vice William Gery, deceased"), and on 16 October 1669 was admitted precentor of Lincoln. In 1681 he exchanged this preferment with John Inett for the living of Nuneaton in Warwickshire, where he died.

== Works ==
Wyatt published A New and Easie Institution of Grammar. In which the labour of many yeares usually spent in learning the Latine tongue is shortened and made easie. In usum Juventutis Cambro-Britannicæ. London, printed by J. Young for R. Royston … Ivie Lane, 1647. Wyatt's epistle of dedication in Latin was dated from Golden Grove, and was addressed to Sir Christopher Hatton; it was followed by one by Taylor in English, addressed to Christopher Hatton, esquire, assumed to be one of the pupils. This short work was published in Taylor's name, but was mainly the work of Wyatt, with some help from William Nicholson and Francis Gregory. A copy of Wyatt's grammar in Caius College, Cambridge, is described in detail in Bonney's Life of Jeremy Taylor (pp. 45 sq.).
