= High Sheriff of Brecknockshire =

Welsh county ceremonial officer

This is a list of High Sheriffs of Brecknockshire or Breconshire.

The office of High Sheriff of Brecknockshire was established in 1535 since when a High Sheriff was appointed annually by the Queen until 1974 when the office was merged into that of High Sheriff of Powys as part of the creation of Powys from the amalgamation of Montgomeryshire, Radnorshire and Brecknockshire. The Office of High Sheriff remained first in precedence in the County until the reign of Edward VII when an Order in Council in 1908 gave the Lord Lieutenant of Brecknockshire the prime Office under the Crown as the Sovereign's personal representative.

== List of sheriffs ==
- 1539: Sir William Vaughan of Porthamel
- 1540: Watkin Herbert, of Crickhowell
- 1541: Sir John Price, Kt, of Brecon Priory
- 1542: Lewis Gwyn, of Gwenffrwd
- 1543: Thomas Havard, of Cwrt Sion Young
- 1544: Richard Herbert, of Aberystwith (?Aberystruth)
- 1545: William Awbrey, of Cantref
- 1546: William Herbert, of Crickhowell
- 1547: Christopher Vaughan, of Tretower
- 1548: Watkin Herbert, of Crickhowell
- 1549: Thomas Havard, of Pontwillim
- 1550: Sir Roger Vaughan, Kt, of Porthamal
- 1551: Richard Herbert of Aberystwyth (?Aberystruth)
- 1552: John Lloyd, of Blantowy
- 1553: Andrew Wynter, of Brecon
- 1554: William John Prosser, of Gaer
- 1555: Thomas Havard, Pontwillim
- 1556: Thomas Sollers, of Porthamal Issaf
- 1557: Rhys Vaughan of Crickhowell
- 1558: Edward Games of Newton and Brecon
- 1559: John Games, of Aberbran
- 1560: Lewis Gwyn, of Gwenffrwd
- 1561: William John Prosser, of Gaer
- 1562: William Games, of Aberbran
- 1563: James Gomond, of Brecon
- 1564: Richard Price, of Brecon Priory
- 1565: Lewis Gunter, of Chilston (Gileston)
- 1566: Edward Herbert, of Crickhowell
- 1567: William Watkins, of Llangorse
- 1568: James Gomond of Brecon
- 1569: William Games, of Aberbran
- 1570: Richard Price, of Brecon Priory
- 1571: Charles Walcott, snr, of Llanfair in Builth
- 1572: John Awbrey, of Abercynrig
- 1573: Charles Awbrey, of Cantref
- 1574: John Games, of Newton
- 1575: Watkin Lloyd, of Trewern in Defynnock
- 1576: William Games, of Aberbran
- 1577: Thomas Vaughan, of Peytyn-gwyn
- 1578: Thomas Games, of Aberbran
- 1579: Charles Walcott, of Llanfair, Builth
- 1580: Sir Henry Jones, Kt, of Abermarlais
- 1581: Hugh Powell, of Talyllyn
- 1582: Thomas Prees Williams, of Ystrad-y-ffin
- 1583: Sir Edward Awbrey, Kt, of Tredomen
- 1584: Roger Vaughan of Clyro, Radnorshire
- 1585: Richard Price died and replaced by son Gregory Price, of Brecon Priory
- 1586: John Awbrey, of Abercynrig
- 1587: John Games, of Newton
- 1588: William Watkins, of Llangorse
- 1589: Sir Edward Awbrey Kt, of Tredomen
- 1590: William Vaughan, of Tretower
- 1591: John Walbeoff, of Llanhamlach
- 1592: Walter Prosser, of Trefecca
- 1593: Gregory Price, of Brecon Priory
- 1594: Roger Vaughan of Clyro
- 1595: William Watkins, of Llangorse
- 1596: John Games, of Newton
- 1597: Richard Herbert, of Penkelly
- 1598: Charles Walcott, the younger
- 1599: Sir Edward Awbrey, Tredomen

=== 17th century ===
- 1600: Sir John Games, Kt, of Newton
- 1601: William Watkins, of Llangorse
- 1602: Roger Williams, of Parc-ar-Irvon
- 1603: Howel Gwynne, of Trecastle
- 1604: John Games, of Buckland
- 1605: Richard Herbert of Clyro
- 1606: Lodowick Lewis, of Trewalter
- 1607: Sir William Awbrey, of Tredomen
- 1608: John Games, of Aberbran
- 1609: John Stedman, of Ystrad-y-ffin
- 1610: Thomas Powell, of Tal-y-llyn
- 1611: Rees Williams, of Defynnock
- 1612: William Rumsey, of Crickhowell
- 1613: Sir Henry Williams, Kt, of Gwernyfed
- 1614: Thomas Price, of Brecon Priory
- 1615: Howel Gwyn, of Trecastle
- 1616: Morgan Awbrey, of Ynyscedwyn
- 1617: Edward Williams, of Llangattock
- 1618: Sir William Lewis, of Llangorse
- 1619: Blanch Parry, of Llandefailog-tre'r-graig
- 1620: John Williams, of Parc-ar-Irvon
- 1621: Charles Vaughan, of Tretower (1st term)
- 1622: John Maddocks, of Llanfrynach
- 1623: Edward Games of Newton
- 1624: Watkin Vaughan, of Merthyr Cynog
- 1625: Richard Games, of Penderyn
- 1626: Sir Henry Williams, Kt, of Gwernyfed
- 1627: John Walbeoff, of Llanhamlach
- 1628: Thomas Boulcott, of Brecon
- 1629: Thomas Gwynne, of Hay Castle
- 1630: John Stedman, of Dol-y-gaer
- 1631: John Jeffreys, of Abercynrig
- 1632: Howel Gwynne, of Tynmawr in Builth
- 1633: John Lewis, of Ffrwdgrech
- 1634: John Herbert, of Crickhowell
- 1635: Charles Vaughan, of Tretower (2nd term)
- 1636: Sir William Lewis, Bt, of Llangorse
- 1637: David Gwynne, of Glanbran
- 1638: Meredith Lewis, of Pennant
- 1639: Henry Williams, of Caebalva
- 1640: Edward Lewis, of Llangattock
- 1641: John Herbert, of Crickhowell
- 1642: John Herbert, of Crickhowell
- 1643: Lewis Lloyd, of Wernos, in Crickadarn
- 1644: Howel Gwynne, of Glanbran
- 1645: Howel Gwynne, of Glanbran
- 1646: Roger Vaughan, of Trephilip
- 1647: Edward Games, of Buckland
- 1648: Charles Walbeoff, of Llanhamlach
- 1649: William Watkins, of Sheephouse
- 1650: Thomas Watkins, of Llanigon
- 1651: William Jones, of Coity in Llanfigan
- 1652: Roger Games, of Tregaer
- 1653: John Williams, of Cwmdu
- 1654: Meredith Lewis, of Pennant
- 1655: William Morgan, of Dderw
- 1656: Thomas Powell, of Maesmawr
- 1657: Hoo Games, of Newton
- 1658: Thomas Gunter, of Gilston
- 1659: Edward Williams, of Gwernvigin
- 1660: Edward Williams, replaced
- 1661: Walter Vaughan, of Trebarried
- 1662: Sir John Herbert, Kt, of Crickhowell
- 1663: Henry Williams, of Caebalva
- 1664: John Williams, of Cwmdu
- 1665: Edward Powel, of Maesmawr
- 12 November 1665: Hugh Powell, of Castlemadoc
- 7 November 1666: John Stedman, of Dol-y-gaer
- 6 November 1667: Thomas Williams, of Abercamlais
- 6 November 1668: James Watkins, of Trecoed
- 11 November 1669: John Gwyn, of Abercrave in Glyntawe
- 4 November 1670: Rees Price, of Cilmeri
- 9 November 1671: Thomas Bowen, of Llanywern, or Thomas Brown, of Tallalin
- 11 November 1672: Daniel Williams, of Penpont
- 12 November 1673: Lodowick Lewis, of Pennant
- 18 November 1674: William Vaughan, of Yscirfechan in Merthyr Cynog
- 15 November 1675: William Saunders
- 1676: Howel Powel, of Pool Hall
- 10 November 1676: Rees Penry, of Brecon
- 15 November 1677: John Waters, of Brecon
- 1679: Thomas Boulcott, of Brecon
- 13 November 1679: John Walbeoff, of Llanhamlach
- 4 November 1680: Charles Jones, of Trebinshwn
- 1682: William Bowen, of Trebervedd
- 1683: Morgan Awbrey, of Yniscedwyn
- 1684: John Lewis, of Coedmawr, Cardigan
- 1685: Morgan Watkins, of Defynnock
- 1686: Saunders Saunders, of Brecon
- 1687: Thomas Williams, of Talgarth
- 1688 (Jan-Jul): Rowland Gwynne of Llanelwedd, Radnorshire
- 1688: Edward Williams, of Ffrwdgrech
- 1689: John Gunter, of Trevecca
- 1690: William Williams, of Felinnewydd
- 1691: Samuel Pritchard, of Builth
- 1692: John Williams, of Cwmdu
- 1693: Gwynne Vaughan, of Trebarried
- 1694: Edward Jones, of Buckland
- 1695: William Winter, of Brecon
- 1696: Samuel Williams, of Trevithel
- 1697: Thomas Bowen, of Llanywern
- 1698: Howel Jones, of Brecon
- 1699: Sir Edward Williams, Kt, of Gwernyfed

=== 18th century ===
- 1700: Thomas Price, of Glyn Tarrell
- 1701: Sackville Gwynne, of Glanbran, and Tymawr, in Builth
- 1702: Richard Stedman, of the Abbey (?Strata Florida)
- 1703: John Davies, of Cefnllys-gwyn
- 1704: Peter Saunders, of Bristol
- 1705: Godfrey Harcourt, of Dan-y-parc
- 1706: William Price, of Cilmeri
- 1707: Robert Rous, of Llanhamlach
- 1708: Henry Williams, of Llangattock
- 1710: John St Loe, of Defynnock
- 1711: Anthony Morgan, of Llanbedr
- 1712: Hugh Powel, of Castle Madoc
- 1713: Rees Price, of Devynnock
- 1714: William Saunders, of Bristol
- 1715: Richard Lewis, of Llangeney
- 1716: Henry Williams, of Bailibrith
- 1717: Edward Matthews, of Gileston
- 1718: Charles Penry, of Brecon
- 1719: Price Devereux, of Tregoyd
- 1720: Thomas Prosser, of Porthamal
- 1721: Richard Hughes, of Brecon
- 1722: Thomas Jones, of Tredustan
- 1723: Henry Rumsey, Crickhowell
- 1724: Joshua Parry, of Llandevailog tre'r graig
- 1725: Miles Stedman, of Dol-y-gaer
- 1726: Richard Wellington, of Hay Castle
- 1727: Richard Portrey, of Ynyscedwyn
- 1728: Marmaduke Protheroe, of Builth
- 1729: William Wynter, of Brecon
- 1730: Lewis Harcourt, of Danyparc
- 1731: Rees Price, of Cwmclyd in Llanvihangel-bryn-Pabuan
- 1732: Penry Williams, of Penpont
- 1733: William Matthews, of Gileston
- 1734: Charles Vaughan, of Scethrog
- 1735: Evan William, of Rhos in Talgarth
- 1736: Thomas Chamberlain, of Trevecca
- 1737: Watson Powel, of Tyleglas
- 1738: Charles Powel, of Castle Madoc
- 1739: Jenkin Williams, of Felin-newydd
- 1740: William Vaughan, of Tregaer
- 1741: Jeffrey Jeffreys, of the Priory
- 1742: Anthony Morgan, of Llanelly
- 1743: Peter Saunders, of Pen-y-lan
- 1744: Roderick Prydderch, of Cilwhibart
- 1745: Edward Williams, of Llangattock Court
- 1746: Richard Wellington, of Hay Castle
- 1747: Charles Harcourt, of Dan-y-parc
- 1748: David Davies, of Cwmwysc
- 1749: William Brydges, of Brecon
- 1750: John Price, of Cwmclyd
- 1751: Henry Rumsey, of Crickhowell
- 1752: John Williams, of Laswern in Llangynidr
- 1753: David Williams of Gaer
- 1754: John Harcourt, of Dan-y-parc
- 1755: Thomas Price, of Talgarth
- 1756: William Prydderch, of Llandevailog-fach
- 1757: Lewis Price, of Llangorse
- 1758: Henry Mitchell, of Battel
- 1759: Evan Hughes, of Pontywall
- 1760: John Bullock Lloyd, of Brecon
- 1761: Howel Gwyn of Newton
- 1762: John Meredith, of Brecon
- 1763: John Jones of Trewern
- 1764: Thomas Bowen, of Tylecrwn
- 1765: Owen Evans, of Pennant
- 1766: David Jones, of Dan-y-crug
- 1767: Maurice Jarvis, of Tretower
- 1768: Thomas Harris, of Tregunter
- 1769: Thomas Powell of Brecon
- 1770: David Lloyd, of Blaenclydach
- 1771: Marmaduke Gwynne, of Garth
- 1772: William Davies, of Dolecoed
- 1773: Thomas Evans, of Pennant
- 1774: Charles Lawrence of Llyswen
- 1775: William Powell, of Llanwrthwl
- 1776: Walter Watkins, of Dan-y-graig
- 1777: Thynne Howe Gwynne, of Buckland
- 1778: Walter Wilkins of Cui
- 1779: Charles Vaughan, of Scethrog
- 1780: Philip Williams of Llangattock
- 1781: Lewis Williams, of Pentwyn in Troescoed
- 1782: Joshua Morgan, of Llanelly
- 1783: Thomas Meredith, of Brecon
- 1784: Edmund Williams of Prisk in Llangattock
- 1785: Walter Roberts, of Llangorse
- 1786: David Watkins, of Aberllech
- 1787: John Jones of Llanavan Fawr
- 1788: Sir Edward Williams, of Llangoed Castle
- 1789: Jeffreys Wilkins, of Brecon
- 1790: Samuel Hughes of Tregunter
- 1791: Walter Jeffreys, of Brecon
- 1792: William James, of Pool Hall
- 1793: John Lloyd, of Aberannell
- 1794: Richard Wellington, of Hay Castle
- 1795: Henry Skrine, of Dan-y-parc
- 1796: Philip Champion de Crespigny of Tal-y-Llyn
- 1797: John Macnamara, of Llangoed Castle
- 1798: John Lloyd, of Dinas
- 1799: Edward Loveden Loveden, of Llangorse and of Buscot, Berkshire

=== 19th century ===
- 5 February 1800: Richard Gough Aubrey, of Ynyscedwyn
- 11 February 1801: Matthew Gwyn, of Abercrave
- 3 February 1802: Joseph Sparkes, of Penywrlodd
- 3 February 1803: Sackville Gwynne, of Tymawr
- 2 March 1803: Edward Kendall, of Beaufort
- 1 February 1804: Penry Williams, of Penpont
- 6 February 1805: William Greenly, of Cwmdu
- 1 February 1806: Osborne Yeats, of Llangattock Court
- 4 February 1807: Sackville Gwynne, of Glanbran
- 24 February 1808: Rees Williams, of Gwainclawth
- 6 February 1809: Thomas Wood, of Gwernyfed
- 31 January 1810: James Jones, of Llanthomas
- 8 February 1811: Walter Wilkins the younger, of Alexanderstone
- 24 January 1812: Charles Fox Champion Crespigny, of Tallyn
- 10 February 1813: Evan Thomas, of Llwynmadoc
- 4 February 1814: John Hotchkis, of Llanwysk Villa
- 13 February 1815: Hugh Price, of Castle Madoc
- 1816: Edward Kendal, of Dan-y-parc
- 1817: Charles Claude Clifton, of Tymawr
- 1818: John Wilkins (or Williams), of Cui
- 1819: John Gwynne, of Gwernvale
- 1820: Thomas Price, of Cilmeri
- 1821: Edward Jones, of Battle End
- 1822: John Christie, of Cwmllwyfog
- 1823: Richard Davys, of Dolecoed, Llanwrtyd
- 1824: William Augustus Gott, of Penmyarth
- 1825: Henry Allen, of Oakfield
- 1826: Edward William Seymour of Porthmawr
- 1827: Capel Hanbury Leigh, of Pontypool Park
- 1828: Fowler Price, of Ty-yn-y-coed, Llanlleonvel
- 1829: John Parry-Wilkins
- 1830: Williams Lewis Hopkins of Aberanell
- 1831: Ebenezer Maitland of Garth
- 1832: James Price Gwynne Holford of Buckland
- 1833: William Henry West of Beaufort
- 1834: William Richard Stretton, of Dany Park
- 1835: Sir Edward Hamilton, 1st Baronet, of Trebinshun
- 1836: John Lloyd Vaughan Watkins, of Pennoyre
- 1837: Crawshay Bailey, of Beaufort
- 1838: James Duncan Thomson, of Sunnybank
- 1839: John Lloyd, of Dinas
- 1840: Richard Douglas Gough, of Yniscedwin
- 1841: William Hibbs Bevan, of Glannant
- 1842: Howell Jones Williams, of Coity Mawr
- 1843: Walter Maybery, of Brecknock
- 1844: Howel Gwyn, of Abercrave
- 1845: William Williams, of Aberpergwm
- 1846: Morgan Morgan, of Bodwigiad
- 1847: Rhys Davies Powel, of Graig-y-Nos
- 1848: Penry Williams, of Penpont
- 1849: William Pearce, of Ffrwdgrech
- 1850: Sir Charles Morgan, 3rd Baronet
- 1851: Robert Raikes, of Treberfydd
- 1852: Paul Mildmay Pell, of Tymawr
- 1853: Wyndham William Lewis, of Llanthetty Hall
- 1854: John Powell, of Watton Mount
- 1855: John Williams Vaughan, of Velinnewydd
- 1856: Thomas Davies, of Llangattock Court
- 1857: James Price William Gwynne Holford, of Buckland
- 1858: Thomas Wood the younger, of the Lodge
- 1859: John Maund, of Tymawr
- 1860: John Evans, of Brecon
- 1861: Jeston Williams Fredericks, of Talwen
- 1862: David Watkins Lloyd, of Aberllech
- 1863: Thomas De Winton, of Cefn Cantref
- 1864: Sir Joseph Bailey, 2nd Baronet, of Glanusk Park
- 1865: Henry Gwynne Vaughan, of Esgair-fechan
- 1866: William Fuller-Maitland, of Garth House
- 1867: John Williams-Morgan, of Bolgoed House
- 1868: John Evan Thomas, of Penisha'r-Pentre
- 1869: William Powell, of Chapel House, Alltmawr
- 1870: Hugh Powell Price, of Castle Madoc
- 1871: Thomas John Evans, of Tymawr-yn-y-Glyn
- 1872: John Jayne, of Pant-y-Bailea, Abergavenny
- 1873: Oliver Morgan Bligh, of Cilmery Park, Builth
- 1874: William de Winton, of Maesderwen, Llanfrynach
- 1875: James Vaughan, of the Castle, Builth
- 1876: Mordecai Jones of Morganwg House
- 1877: George Overton of Watton Mount
- 1878: Colonel Thomas Conway Lloyd of Dinas
- 1879: David Evans, of Ffrwdgrech
- 1880: Captain Thomas Wood, of Gwernyfedd Park, Glasbury.
- 1881 Francis William Alexander Roche, Rochemount, Cork and Tregunter Park, Brecknockshire and Tremadoc, Carnarvonshire
- 1882: James Lewis of Plas-draw, Glamorganshire and Pwll-Ivor, Brecknockshire
- 1883: William Thompson Crawshay, of Cyfarthfa Castle, Merthyr Tydfil
- 1884: Sir William Lewis, of Mardy, Aberdare, Glamorgan
- 1885: Charles Evan-Thomas, of The Gnoll, Neath, Glamorgan
- 1886: Thomas Wood, Gwernyfed Park, of Three Cocks, Llwyn-y-Brane, Caermarthenshire
- 1887: Richard Crawshay, of Tymawr, near Abergavenny
- 1888: Lieutenant-Colonel John Morgan, of Lion-street, Brecon
- 1889: Thomas Chichele Bargrave Watkins, of Brecon
- 1890: Richard Digby Cleasby, of Penoyre, Brecon
- 1891: William Thomas Powell, of Chapel House, Builth
- 1892: John Andrew Doyle, of Pendarren, Crickhowell
- 1893: Bowen Pottinger Woosnam of Tynygraig, Builth
- 1894: Morgan Thomas, of Abersenny, Sennybridge, Brecon
- 1895: Fleming Richard Dansey Aubrey Gough, of Yniscedwyn House, Swansea Vale
- 1896: Howell Richard Jones Williams, of Cut Park, Talybont
- 1897: Stuart Williams Morgan, of Bolgoed, near Brecon
- 1898: Colonel John Morgan, of Bank House, Brecon
- 1899: David Hughes Morgan, of Tredurn, Brecon

=== 20th century ===
- 1900: Howel John James Price of Glynllech, Swansea Vale
- 1901: John Edwards Vaughan, of Rheola, Neath and Maesgronen
- 1902: Joseph Edward Moore-Gwyn of Ahercrave House, Ystradgynlais, Breconshire
- 1903: William David Davies of Cwmwysg, Senny Bridge
- 1904: William Bailey Partridge, of Glowcoed, Breconshire, and Bacton, Herefordshire,
- 1905: John Atcherley Jebb, of Watton Mount, Brecon
- 1906: John Conway Lloyd of Dinas, Brecon
- 1907: Edward Davies, of Bwlch-y-waun, Breconshire and Machen House, near Newport, Monmouthshire
- 1908: Henry Edward Gray, of Ynysowen, Merthyr Vale, Glamorgan
- 1909: James Benjamin Garsed Price of Dylais Fach, near Neath, Glamorganshire, and Glynllech, Breconshire
- 1910: John James Watkins, of Greenhill, Crickhowell
- 1911: Roger Jeffreys Powell of Maespoth, Senny Bridge
- 1912: John David Douglas Evans of Ffrwdgrech
- 1913: Evan Evans-Bevan of Cadoxton, Neath
- 1914: John James Jones, of Fronheulog, Cefn
- 1915: David Jones of Pytindu, Brecon
- 1916: Rees Llewellyn, of Bwllfa House, Cwmdare, Aberdare
- 1917: Morgan Watkin Morgan, of Bryntawe, Abercrave
- 1918: David Powell, of Caedryssu, Brecon
- 1919: Rhys Davies, of Cefn-y-meusydd, Abercrave
- 1920: David Daniel, of Bryncoed, Crynant, Neath
- 1921: Thomas Picton Rose Richards, of Caer-Beris, Builth Wells
- 1922: Thomas Edwards Richards of Bargoed Hall, Bargoed, Glamorganshire
- 1923: Thomas Price Thomas, of Bank House, Brecon
- 1924: Henry Seymour Berry, of Buckland, Bwlch, Breconshire
- 1925: Thomas James Davies, of Maesyderi, Abercrave
- 1926: Robert McTurk, of Cnewr, Cray, Breconshire
- 1927: John Llewelyn Morgan, of Brynderwen, Llandaff
- 1928: William Morgan Llewellyn, of Bwllfa House, Cwmdare, Aberdare
- 1929: David Martyn Evans Bevan, of Cadoxton House, Neath
- 1930: Howell Alfred Morgan, of Maesycoed, Ystradgynlais, Breconshire
- 1931: David James Davies, of Brynawel, Abercrave, Breconshire
- 1932: David Rupert Phillips, of The Greenway, Radyr, Cardiff
- 1933: Christopher Armstrong, of Gelli, Crynant, Neath
- 1934: Philip Williams, of 312, Earls Court Road, London, S.W.5
- 1935: David Morgan Rees, of Benton House, Whitchurch, Cardiff
- 1936: Thomas John Thomas, of Glanrhos Hall, Rhayader, Radnor
- 1937: David Charles Exton Evans,of Ty Gwyn, 30, Monkhams Drive, Woodford Green, Essex
- 1938: Morton Howell Llewellyn, of Wernoleu, Ammanford, Carmarthenshire
- 1939: John Wilfred Rowlands, of 25, Cholmeley Park, Highgate, London, N.6
- 1940: George Ethelbert Sayce, of "Fern Lea", Builth Wells, Breconshire
- 1941: Bevington Rhys Gibbins, of Cwmirfon Lodge, Llanwrtyd Wells, Breconshire
- 1942: Gwilym Ffrancon Williams, of 14, Park Lane, Aberdare, Glamorgan
- 1943: John Murray, of Loan-Riavach, Llangorse
- 1944: William Craven Llewelyn, of Forest, Clydach, Glamorgan
- 1945: John Jones, of Voel, King Street, Brynmawr, Brecon
- 1946: Reginald Heber Rees Lloyd, of Heathcliff, 73, Eaton Grove, Swansea
- 1947: George Ethelbert Sayce, of Dinsterwood, Pontrilas, Herefordshire
- 1948: Dr. John Emrys Jenkins, of Chalfont, Llandrindod Wells
- 1949: Ernest Ashby Watts, of Bryn-y-gaer, Brecon.
- 1950: David Rhys Lewis, of "Tredilion", Uplands, Swansea
- 1951: David John Price, of "Plasycoed", Upper Cwmtwrch, Breconshire
- 1952: Guy Bown, of Boughspring House, Tidenham, Chepstow
- 1953: John Martin Davies, of 12, Hawthorne Avenue, Uplands, Swansea
- 1954: John Keysell, of Ty Llwyd, King Street, Brynmawr
- 1955: David Lloyd Jones, of "Highclere", St. Lawrence Road, Chepstow
- 1956: James William Tudor Thomas, of Clifton Lodge, Cathedral Road, Cardiff
- 1957: Lewis Thomas Edwards, of 227, Chase Side, Southgate, London, N.14
- 1958: Colonel Kevern Ivor Morgan, of 15, Hawthorne Avenue, Uplands, Swansea
- 1959: Joshua Thomas, of Gwernvale Manor, Crickhowell
- 1960: Thomas Leslie Lowe, of "Sherwood", Park Road, Penarth, Glamorgan
- 1961: Thomas Hughes, of Greenfields, Green Avenue, Porthcawl, Glamorgan
- 1962: Howell Powell, of Pontybat, Brecon
- 1963: David Michael Morgan Rees, of The Meadows, Lisvane, Cardiff
- 1964: Lieut-Colonel Rees William Marshall, of West Acre, Langland Court Road, Newton, Swansea, Glamorgan
- 1965: Major William Rhys Lloyd, of Abercynrig, Brecon
- 1966: Elwyn Owen Jones, of Sheep House, Hay-on-Wye
- 1967: Martyn Evan Evans Bevan, of Bronllys Castle, Brecon
- 1968: Sir George Vernon Kitson, of Dan-y-Castell, Crickhowell
- 1969: Francis Lewis Parry de Winton, of Ty Mawr, Llanfrynach
- 1970: Mervyn Leigh Bourdillon of Llwyn Madoc, Llanwrtyd Wells
- 1971: The Lady Brecon of Greenhill, Cross Oak, Brecon
- 1972: Herbert Stanley Jones of Castell Madoc, Brecon
- 1973: Major John Lewis Harpur of Llanbrynean, Llanfrynach, Brecon
- after 1974 - See High Sheriff of Powys
