= John Pritchett (bishop) =

English churchman

John Pritchett (died 1 January 1681) was an English churchman, bishop of Gloucester from 1672.

== Life ==
He was the son of Walter Pritchett of Cowley Hall. He studied at the University of Oxford from 1622, graduating M.A. in 1629. He was collated to the joint rectory of St Andrew Undershaft-St Mary Axe in 1641, but was sequestrated during the First English Civil War. Under the Commonwealth he had a living at Harlington, Middlesex, but was replaced in 1658. He also held the curacy of the church at Harefield, Middlesex, but was removed from that position in favour of a Mr. Hoare.

After the Restoration, he returned to his position at St Andrew Undershaft. He was appointed vicar of St Giles Cripplegate in 1663, successor to John Dolben. He avoided the Great Plague of London in 1665 by moving to the country.

He was appointed bishop of Gloucester in 1672, but continued as vicar of St Giles Cripplegate. In his diocese he opposed the dissenter Nicholas Billingsley.

He died on his estate at Harefield on 1 January 1681 and was buried under the pulpit of Harefield Church. He left to St Giles Cripplegate a communion flagon that still belongs to the church.

Church of England titles
Preceded by William Nicholson	Bishop of Gloucester; 1672-1681	Succeeded by Robert Frampton
