= Hugh Powell =

16th-century English politician

Hugh Powell (died 1587) was an English politician.

He was the son of John or Howell Powell of Breconshire and was educated at Oxford University (1559).

He was the Registrar for the Salisbury diocese from 1562 to 1584. He was appointed High Sheriff of Breconshire for 1582–83. He was elected member (MP) of the parliament of England for Devizes in 1563 and for Old Sarum in 1572.

He married Eleanor, the daughter of John Corriatt of Salisbury. They had no children.
