= Richard Willis (bishop) =

English bishop (1664–1734)

Richard Willis (1663–1734) was an English bishop.

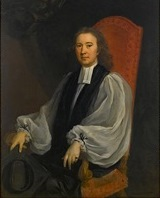
Richard Willis by Michael Dahl

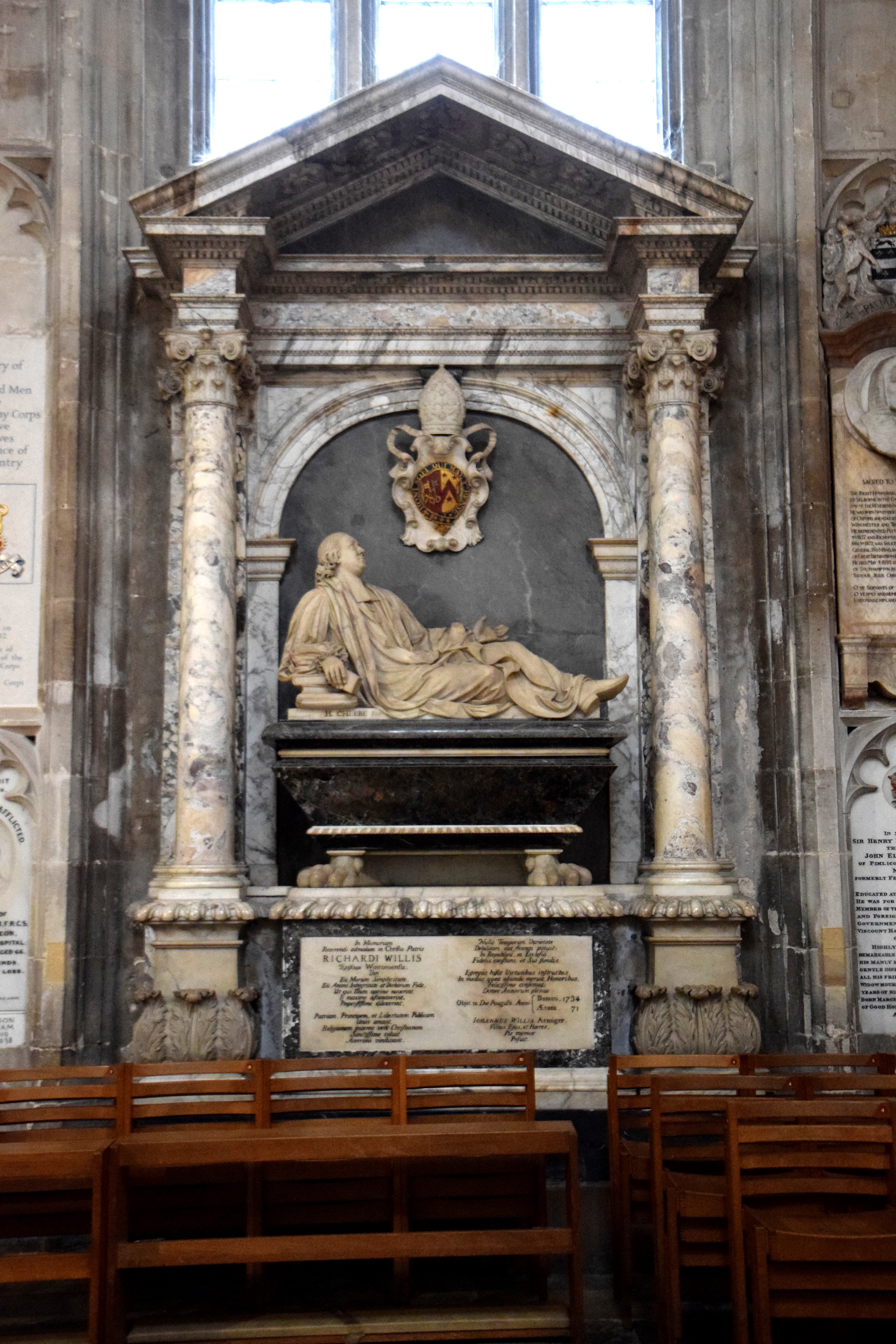
Monument to Bishop Willis in Winchester Cathedral by Henry Cheere

== Life ==
Willis was born in Ribbesford, Worcestershire, where his father was a tanner. He was educated at Bewdley Grammar School and Wadham College, Oxford, where he matriculated in 1684 and graduated BA in 1688. He became a Fellow of All Souls College, Oxford.

Willis became a curate at Cheshunt and then, in 1692, lecturer at St Clement, Strand, where he acquired a reputation as a preacher. In 1694 he was chaplain to King William III on a journey to the Netherlands.

In 1701 Willis was appointed Dean of Lincoln and in 1714 Bishop of Gloucester. In 1721 he became Bishop of Salisbury and Chancellor of the Order of the Garter before transferring in 1723 to be Bishop of Winchester and Clerk of the Closet. Willis was Lord High Almoner from 1718 to 1723.

He was one of the principal founders of the Society for Promoting Christian Knowledge (SPCK). He gave in 1702 the first of the annual sermons on behalf of the Society for the Propagation of the Gospel in Foreign Parts (SPG). It proposed an influential set of theories about evangelical missionary work in connection with the Anglican church settlement, commercial life and colonization.

He accused John Locke of “Hobbism” citing a parallel with Leviathan. He attacked deism in general, and John Toland and William Stephens in particular.

He gave a thanksgiving sermon 23 August 1705, for victories of the Duke of Marlborough in the War of the Spanish Succession. Given in St Paul's Cathedral, it was an elaborate effort for a full state occasion, and was published. It attracted also attracted controversy, with John Hughes writing A review of the case of Ephraim and Judah, and its application to the case of the church of England and the dissenters, and Joseph Williamson replying. He was also attacked by the Unitarian Thomas Emlyn.

He was a Whig in politics.

He died on 10 August 1734 aged 71. There is a large memorial to him in Winchester Cathedral sculpted by Henry Cheere.

== Notes ==
Church of England titles
Preceded by Edward Fowler	Bishop of Gloucester; 1715–1722	Succeeded by Joseph Wilcocks
Preceded by William Talbot	Bishop of Salisbury; 1722–1723	Succeeded by Benjamin Hoadly
Preceded by Charles Trimnell	Bishop of Winchester; 1723–1734	Succeeded by Benjamin Hoadly
