= John Wakeman =

English Benedictine

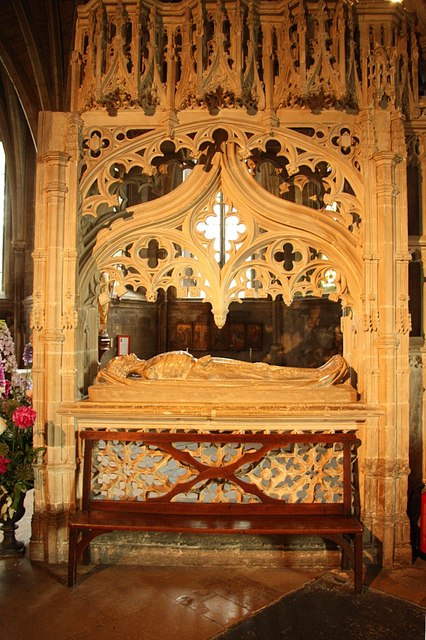
The cadaver monument which Abbot Wakeman had erected for himself at Tewkesbury Abbey

John Wakeman (died 1549) was an English Benedictine, the last Abbot of Tewkesbury and first Bishop of Gloucester, both posts in the English county of Gloucestershire. In the earlier part of his life he went by the name John Wiche.

== Life ==
He was the second son of William Wakeman of Drayton, Worcestershire. He supplicated in the name of John Wyche, for the degree of Bachelor of Divinity on 3 February 1511.

On 19 March 1534 a congé d'élire was issued for the election of an abbot of the Benedictine monastery of Tewkesbury to replace Henry Beeley, deceased. On 27 April 1534 royal assent was given to the election of John Wiche, late prior, as abbot. The temporalities were restored on 10 June. Wiche had secured his own appointment by intrigue, obtaining the interest of Sir William Kingston and of Thomas Cromwell, and by then persuading his brethren to refer the election to the king's pleasure. At the end of July 1535 both Cromwell and the king were staying at the monastery, and in October Wiche sent Cromwell a gelding and £5 to buy him a saddle. He supplied information to the government on the disaffection of one of his priors.

On 9 January 1539 he surrendered his monastery, receiving an annuity of four hundred marks. He then seems to have taken the name Wakeman, by which he was afterwards known. On his nomination to the newly erected see of Gloucester in September 1541 this pension was vacated. The date of the letters patent for the erection of the bishopric is 3 September 1541. Wakeman was consecrated by Thomas Cranmer, Edmund Bonner, and Thomas Thirlby at Croydon in September 1541.

In 1547 he attended the funeral of Henry VIII, and on 19 February of the same year assisted at the consecration of Arthur Bulkeley as bishop of Bangor. Wakeman must have had some pretensions to scholarship and theology. In 1542, when Cranmer was projecting a revision of the translation of the New Testament, he assigned the Revelation to Wakeman, with John Chambers, bishop of Peterborough, as his colleague. Wakeman died early in December 1549. His place of burial is uncertain, he is said to have died at Forthampton. While abbot of Tewkesbury, Wakeman constructed a cadaver tomb cenotaph in Tewkesbury Abbey, on the north-east side of the high altar, which is still to be seen.

His nephew Richard was great-grandfather of Sir George Wakeman.

Church of England titles
Preceded by initial appointment	Bishop of Gloucester; 1541–1550	Succeeded by John Hooper
