= Miles Smith (bishop) =

English priest and academic (1554–1624)

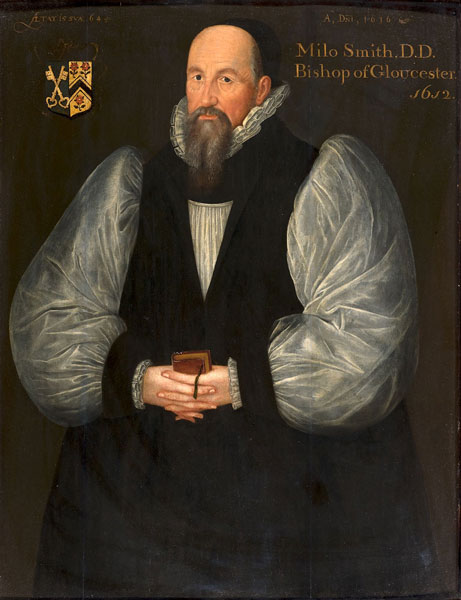
Miles Smith

Miles Smith (1554, Hereford – 1624, Gloucester) was a clergyman of the Church of England renowned as a theologian, scholar and bibliophile. After attaining the degree of doctor of divinity, he became Bishop of Gloucester (1612–1624). Although he may have been at times an indifferent administrator, his erudition contributed fundamentally to the translation and production of the King James Bible.

== Life ==
Smith was born in Hereford, a fletcher's son, and attended Hereford School. He had a brother Richard and a sister Anne. He was of Corpus Christi College, Oxford in 1568, at about which time he transferred to Brasenose College, where he took BA in 1572/73 and MA in 1576. He obtained B.D. at the University of Oxford in 1584/85 and was incorporated in that degree in the University of Cambridge in 1586. He was appointed Vicar of Bosbury in 1584, and Rector of Hampton Bishop, and of a portion of Ledbury, in 1587. In time, he became a residentiary canon of Hereford Cathedral and was awarded his Doctor of Divinity in 1594, where he "proved at length an incomparable theologist," and became chaplain of Christ Church, Oxford. He became a canon of Exeter in 1595, Rector of Hartlebury, Worcs., 1598-1624 and Rector of Upton-on-Severn in 1604. He became one of the original fellows of Chelsea College in 1610. In 1612 he was appointed Bishop of Gloucester, and upon his death in 1624 at the age of 70 he was buried in the cathedral there.

Anthony à Wood quoted from Smith's funeral eulogy in writing of his scholarly erudition:

"From his youth he constantly applied himself to the reading of antient classical authors of the best note, in their own languages; wherewith, as also with neoterics, he was plentifully stored, and lusted after no worldly thing so much as books; of which, tho' he had great store, yet there were none scarce to be found in his library, especially of the antients, that he had not read over... He ran thro' the Greek and Latin fathers, and judiciously noted them in the margin as he went. The Rabbins also, as many as he had, with their glosses and commentaries, he read and used in their own idiom of speech. And so conversant he was, and expert in the Chaldaic, Syriac and Arabic, that he made them as familiar to him, almost, as his own native tongue. Hebrew also he had at his fingers' ends, and withal stories of all times; and for his rich and accomplish'd furniture in that study, he had this e[u]logy given him by a learned bishop of this kingdom, that 'he was a very walking library'."

He was known as a sincere Calvinist and a great accumulator of books. In 1592 he wrote a preface to Bishop Babington's Commentaries on Genesis.

=== King James Version ===
In the translation of the King James Version of the Bible, Smith served in the "First Oxford Company", responsible for the later books of the Old Testament. Anthony à Wood continued as follows:

"For his exactness in those languages, he was thought worthy by king James I. to be called to that great work of the last translation of our English BIBLE, wherein he was esteemed the chief, and a workman that needed not be ashamed. He began with the first, and was the last man in the translation of the work; for after the task of translation was finished by the whole number set a-part and designed to that business, being some few above forty, it was raised by a dozen selected from them, and at length referred to the final examination of Bilson bishop of Winton, and this our author, who, with the rest of the twelve, are stiled in the History of the Synod of Dort, 'vere eximii & ab initio in toto hoc opere versatissimi' [truly excellent, and most accomplished from the beginning in all of this work], as having happily concluded that worthy labour. All being ended, this excellent person Dr. Smith was commanded to write a preface..."

He, with Thomas Bilson, Bishop of Winchester, performed the final examination of the text before sending it to the printer. Bilson composed the Dedicatory Epistle ("To the most High and Mighty Prince, James..." : "Great and manifold were the blessings..."), and Miles Smith composed the Preface ("The Translators to the Reader" : "Zeal to promote the common good...") which stand at the beginning of the "Authorised Version" of the King James Bible.

=== William Laud ===
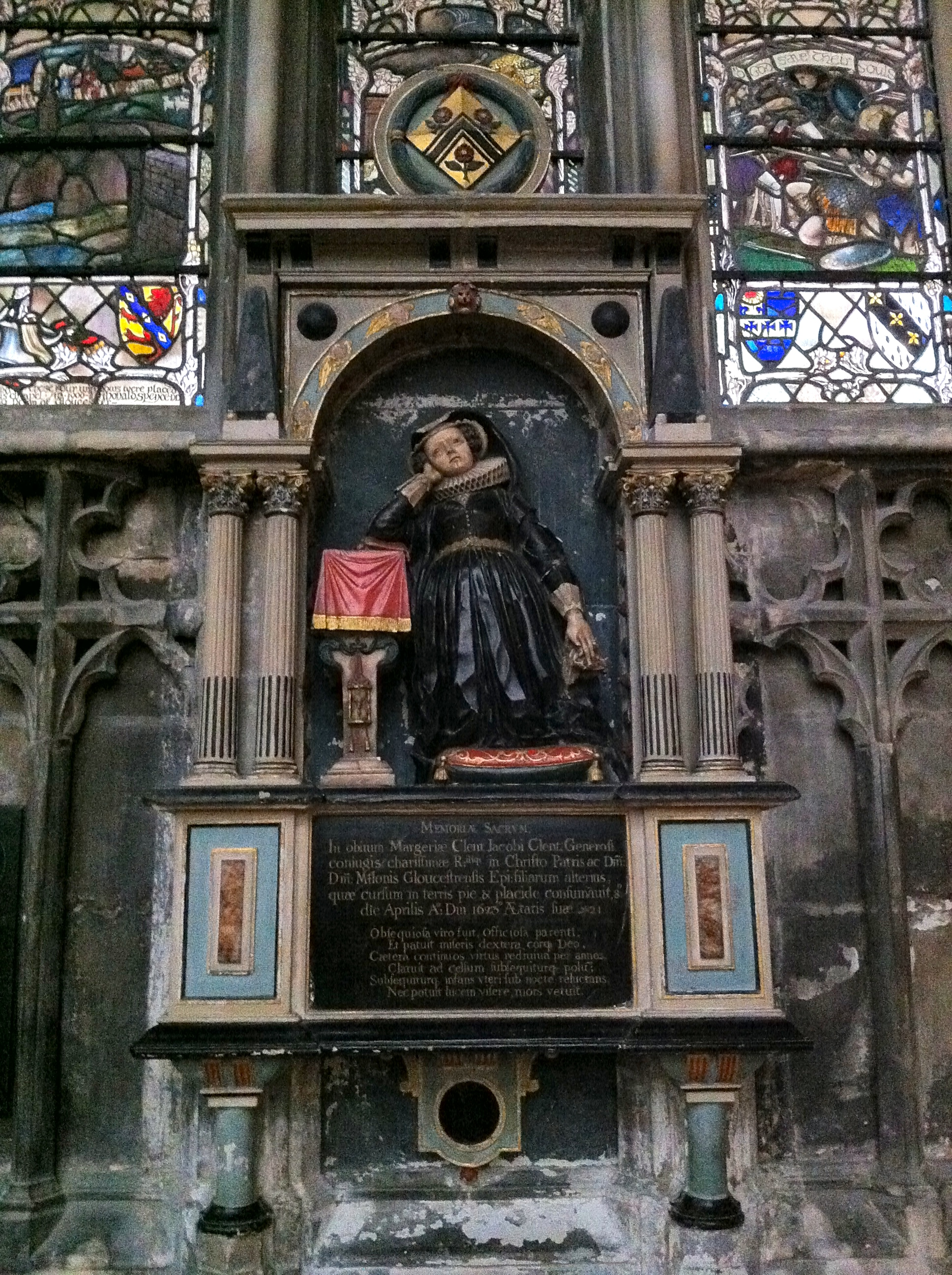
Monument to Margery Smith (Mrs Clent), Gloucester cathedral

It is said that Dr Smith received the bishopric of Gloucester in 1612 as a reward for his great pains taken in the translation of the Bible. "But then withall he was a man that spared not to shew himself upon all occasions in favour of the Calvinian party; and more particularly in countenancing the Lecturers within his Diocess against the lawful Minister of the Parish when ever any complaint of their proceedings was made unto him," wrote Peter Heylyn in his History of William Laud. However the King appointed Laud to be Dean of Gloucester, saying that the church of Gloucester was ill-governed, and requiring him to reform and repair it and to set matters in order. The bishop had set the Communion table in the middle of the choir, but in 1616 Laud had it removed to the east end (the position of a high altar) and advised all the prebendaries, choristers and officers to make low obeisances towards it as they approached. Dr Smith objected fiercely, saying (reputedly) that he would never enter the church again until the table was restored to its former position.

The bishop's chaplain wrote to his Chancellor protesting that the new arrangement would give encouragement to the Roman Catholics who wished to restore superstitious practises, and that the prebendaries had been faint-hearted in their not having resisted the change. A copy of the letter was thrown into the pulpit of St Michael's church, where the sub-Dean, Thomas Prior, used to preach, with the intention of bringing it to the notice of the prebendaries. However it fell into the hands of the parish clerk, and was communicated to the large and turbulent Puritan faction in the city, who raised an outcry against Popery. An Alderman of the city attempted to suppress disturbance by committing various people to prison, but, doubting his powers of containment, he advised the Dean (William Laud) that the High Commissioners should be brought in. Laud was then able to show the bishop that if they acted in consort to restore order, this would be viewed favourably by the king.

=== Death and burial ===
On 26 August 1615 William Camden granted or exemplified for him the following arms: "Or, a chevron cotised sable, between three roses gules, slipped vert" (also blazoned as "Or, a chevron entre 2 cheveronells sable between 3 roses gules, leaves and stalks vert.") Camden's Visitation shows these arms impaling Hawkins (Smith's first wife), as: "Or, on a chevron between three cinquefoils azure, as many escallops argent, on a chief per pale gules and sable a griffin passant ermine."

Bishop Smith died in November 1624 in the presence of his surviving children; his funeral eulogy includes a short deathbed scene. His will, written 7 March 1623/24, and finalized on 12 October 1624, was proved on 6 November 1624. He was buried on 9 November in the Lady Chapel of Gloucester Cathedral, where his grave was marked by a white stone, bearing no inscription but displaying his arms impaled by those of the see of Gloucester.

Smith left his collection of Hebrew and Arabic texts to Hereford Cathedral library. These were to form a working resource for the study of the Bible: the sources and editions are more fully explained and identified in a recent article. His will refers to the following:

- The Venice Bible containing the Targumim and the Rabbins in 4 volumes bound in white leather
- Maimonides in 4 volumes
- (David) Kimhi, his Miklol (Grammar) in Hebrew, his Dictionary in Hebrew, and his work on the Psalms
- Elia Levita, his Meturgeman
- The Bible in Hebrew in 4 volumes in quarto, gilded leaves
- Stephanus print Raphelengius, Arabic Dictionary
- Erpenius, Arabic Grammar
- Arabic New Testament, and the Five Books of Moses (Pentateuch)
- Arabic Lexicon Talmudicum
- The Hebrew Concordance

=== Sermons ===
His funeral sermon was preached at Gloucester by Thomas Prior M.A., a prebendary of Gloucester, and was printed in 1632 together with a posthumous collection of fifteen of Smith's sermons with additional biographical information in the preface. Although it has been claimed that these sermons were productions of Smith's earlier life, it is shown by John Tiller (Chancellor of Hereford Cathedral) that several of them should date from the time of Smith's episcopacy because they include biblical passages in the King James translation of 1611.

== Family ==
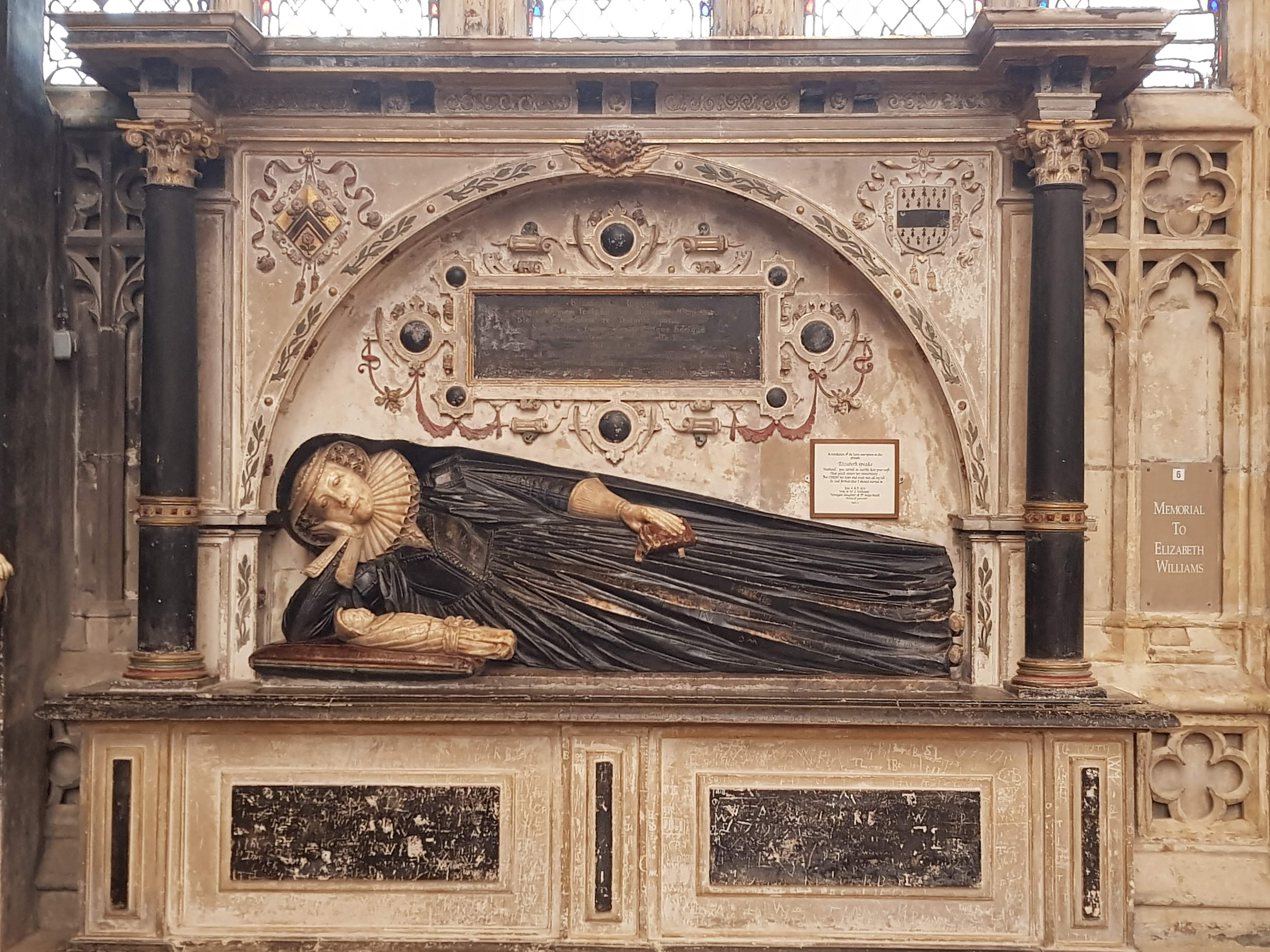
Monument to Elizabeth Smith (Mrs Williams). The Smith arms are in the dexter spandrel of the arch.

According to the Heralds' Visitations, Smith married twice. His first marriage was to Mary Hawkins of Cardiff, who was the mother of Dr Smith's children. His second wife was Elizabeth, daughter of Richard Ligon (or Lygon) of Madresfield, Worcestershire, by whom Dr Smith had no issue. No wife is named in his will.

He had sons,

- Gervase Smith (of the Middle Temple, admitted 28 October 1615) His father's administrator in 1624.
- Miles Smith. His father's administrator in 1626.
- Robert Smith. Named in the will of 1623/24.
- Edward Smith. Named in the will of 1623/24.

He had daughters,

- Margery Smith, died 1623 (married James Clent of Gloucester)
- Elizabeth Smith, died 1622 (married John Williams)
- Margaret Smith, living 1624 (married Edmund Morgan "of Guerneclepa").
- Katherine Smith, (married William Sutton, Chancellor of the see of Gloucester).

Separate elaborate monuments with effigies of his daughters Elizabeth and Margery survive in Gloucester cathedral. Both died in child-birth.

Church of England titles
| Preceded by Giles Thomson | Bishop of Gloucester; 1612–1624 | Succeeded by Godfrey Goodman |
