= Godfrey Goldsborough =

English clergyman

- Bishop of Gloucester
- Church: Church of England
- Predecessor: John Bullingham
- Successor: Thomas Ravis

Personal details
- Born: 1548
- Died: 1604

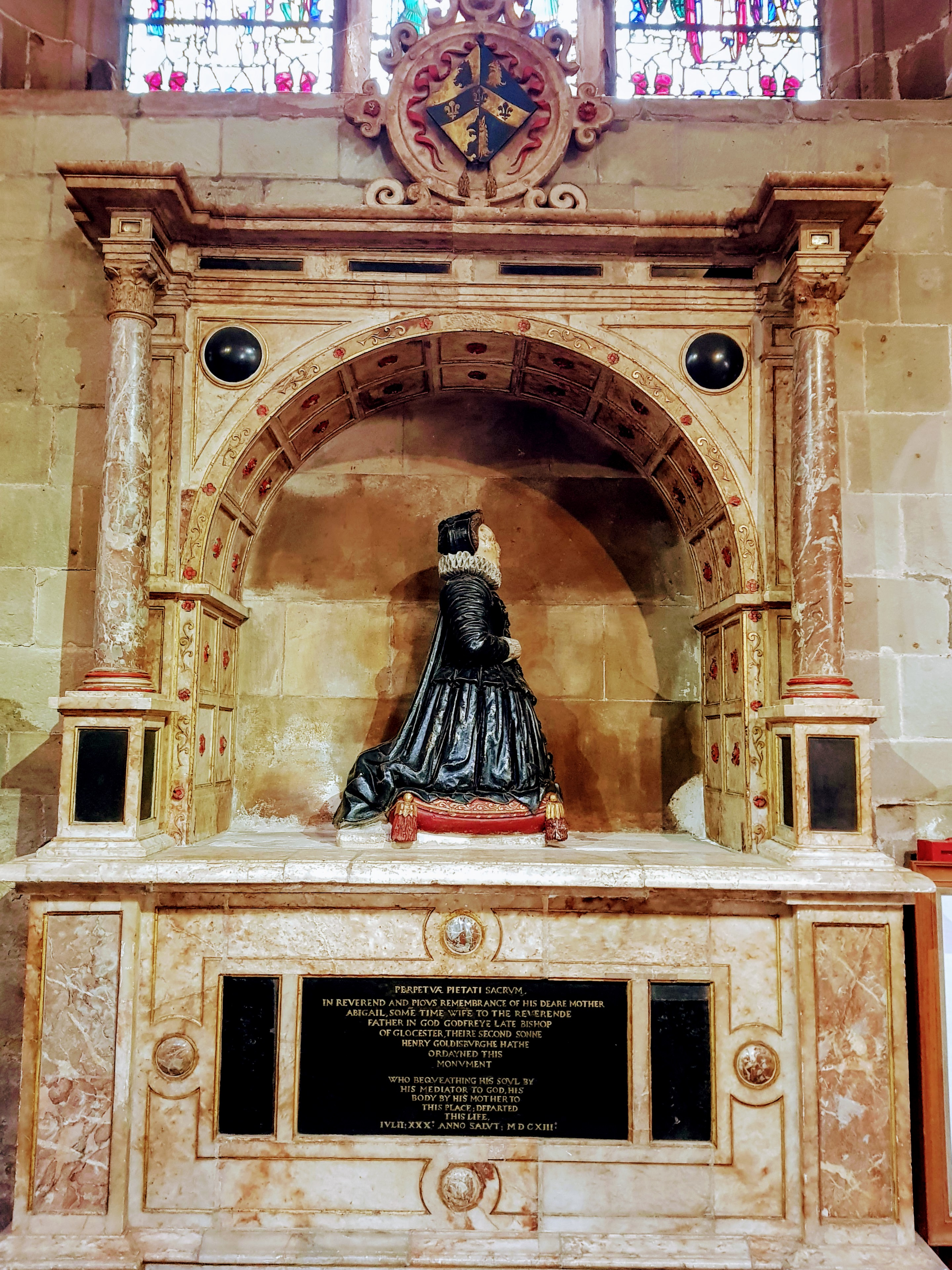
Monument in Worcester Cathedral to Abigail Goldsborough, first wife of Godfrey Goldsborough, Bishop of Gloucester. Erected by his second son Henry Goldsborough (d.30 July 1613)

Godfrey Goldsborough (1548 in Cambridge – 26 May 1604) was a Church of England clergyman and Bishop of Gloucester from 1598 to 1604. He also served as a Prebendary of Worcester.

== Career ==
He was born in 1548 in the town of Cambridge. He was matriculated as a pensioner of Trinity College, Cambridge in 1560, and became a scholar in 1562. In 1565–6 he proceeded B.A. Strype's statement that John Whitgift, afterwards Archbishop of Canterbury, was his tutor, is no doubt erroneous. On 8 September 1567 he was admitted a minor fellow, and on 27 March 1569 a major fellow, of his college. In the latter year he commenced M.A. He was one of the subscribers against the new statutes of the university in May 1572. He proceeded to the degree of B.D. in 1577. On 14 July 1579 he was incorporated in that degree at Oxford, and on the following day he was collated to the archdeaconry of Worcester. On 23 February 1579–80 he was collated to the prebend of Gorwall in the church of Hereford. On 1 September 1581 he was installed a canon of Worcester, and on 13 December following prebendary of Caddington Minor in the church of St. Paul, London. He was created D.D. at Cambridge in 1583. On 30 December 1585 he was installed in the prebend called Episcopi sive Pœnitentiarii, or the golden prebend in the church of Hereford, for which he exchanged the prebend of Gorwall. In or before 1589 he became Archdeacon of Salop in the diocese of Lichfield. He also held the rectory of Stockton—probably the benefice of that name in Shropshire.

On 28 August 1598 he was elected Bishop of Gloucester, and he was consecrated at Lambeth on 12 November The queen licensed him to hold his canonry at Worcester in commendam. During his episcopate he rarely resided in his diocese, and it is said that his palace was much dilapidated.

== Marriages and progeny ==
He married twice:

- Firstly to a certain Abigail, whose monument with kneeling effigy survives in Worcester Cathedral, erected by her second son Henry Goldsborough (d.30 July 1613). He left two further sons John and Godfrey, by which wife unknown.
- Secondly to a certain Helen (1543-1622), as her third husband, who survived him.

== Death and burial ==
He died on 26 May 1604 and was buried in a small chapel within the lady chapel of the cathedral at Gloucester, where there is a handsome altar-tomb, with his recumbent effigy attired in a scarlet rochet, and a Latin inscription.

== See also ==
- List of bishops of Gloucester

== Sources ==
- Cooper, Thompson, Goldsborough, Godfrey, Dictionary of National Biography, 1885–1900, Volume 22

Church of England titles
Preceded by John Bullingham	Bishop of Gloucester; 1598–1604	Succeeded by Thomas Ravis
