= John Bullingham =

Anglican Bishop

John Bullingham (died 1598) was the Bishop of Gloucester in the Church of England from 1581.

== Life ==
Bullingham was a native of Gloucestershire. He was elected a probationer fellow of Magdalen College, Oxford, in July 1550, being then B.A. In the latter part of Edward VI's reign he went as a voluntary exile to France, staying at Rouen, to avoid the church reforms in England. On the accession of Queen Mary he returned to England and was restored to his place. He received his M.A. degree on 1 June 1554.

Bullingham was in favour as domestic chaplain to Stephen Gardiner, Bishop of Winchester, and rector of Boxwell and Withington in Gloucestershire. On the accession of Elizabeth I he remained Catholic and lost his livings. He was subsequently appointed by Edmund Grindal to the prebendal stall of Wenlocks-barn in St Paul's Cathedral on 1 August 1565 and admitted to the degree of B.D. at Oxford under the new reformed regime on 8 July 1566. The next year, on 27 December 1567, he was appointed Archdeacon of Huntingdon by his namesake and probable relation, Nicholas Bullingham, Bishop of Lincoln. He held the post until 1576. He was created D.D. by his university on 12 July 1568 and received from Bishop Bullingham the stall of Louth in Lincoln Cathedral on 10 September of the same year and still retaining his other preferments was installed canon of Worcester on 13 October 1570. He was incorporated D.D. of Cambridge on 7 July 1575. When Grindal held a visitation in 1576 of his province by commission, Bullingham was one of those appointed to visit the Diocese of Hereford.

He was raised to the episcopate in 1581, being consecrated on 3 September of that year at Croydon to the see of Gloucester. He was allowed to hold the recently created bishopric of Bristol in commendam as well as the prebend of Norton in Hereford Cathedral, to which he was installed on 16 January 1582. He held the see of Bristol until the appointment of Richard Fletcher, at whose consecration he assisted on 14 December 1589. The rectory of Kilmington in Somerset was given him in compensation for the loss of the second bishopric and his Hereford stall. He served as commissioner for the confirmation of Whitgift's election as archbishop on 27 August 1583 and in 1584 was commissioned by the new primate to visit his own Diocese of Gloucester. When the see of Oxford fell vacant in 1592, John Aylmer, then Bishop of London, at his request unsuccessfully endeavoured to obtain it for Bullingham. Bullingham died at Kensington on 20 May 1598 and was buried in his own cathedral. He was one of the targets of attack for Martin Marprelate.

== Works ==
A letter relating to his friend Julins Palmer is printed in John Foxe's Acts and Monuments. Palmer had also been a Roman Catholic exile but became a Reformation convert and martyr. The only other work attributed to Bullingham is "a translation of John Venerus's oration in defence of the Sacrament of the Aultare" (1554).

== Notes ==
Church of England titles
Preceded by Richard Cheyney	Bishop of Gloucester; 1581–1598	Succeeded by Godfrey Goldsborough
