= Thomas Ravis =

English bishop and Bible translator, c. 1560–1609

The Right Reverend Thomas Ravis
- Bishop of London
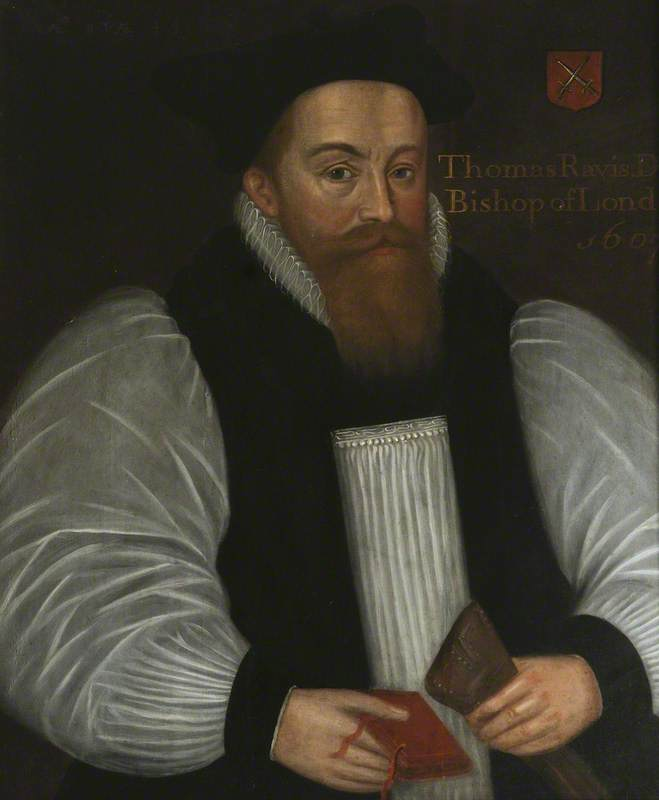
- Church: Church of England
- Diocese: Diocese of London
- Elected: 18 May 1607
- Installed: 2 June 1607
- Term ended: 1609 (death)
- Predecessor: Richard Vaughan
- Successor: George Abbot
- Other posts: Bishop of Gloucester; 1604–1607; Dean of Christ Church, Oxford; 1596–1607

Orders
- Ordination: 1582
- Consecration: 17 March 1605

Personal details
- Born: c. 1560 Old Malden, Surrey
- Died: 14 December 1609
- Buried: St Paul's Cathedral, London
- Denomination: Anglican
- Profession: Academic
- Education: Westminster School
- Alma mater: Christ Church, Oxford

Thomas Ravis (c. 1560 – 14 December 1609) was a Church of England bishop and academic. He was among those engaged in translating the King James Bible.

== Early life ==
Ravis was born at Old Malden in Surrey, probably in 1560, and educated at Westminster School. He was elected, on the recommendation of Lord Burghley, to Christ Church, Oxford, in 1575, but the dean and chapter declined to admit him on the grounds that there was no room, until Burghley remonstrated with them. He gained a BA on 12 November 1578 and an MA on 3 March 1582, proceeding to a bachelor's divinity degree in 1589 and a divinity doctorate in 1595.

== Priestly career ==
Ravis took holy orders in 1582 and preached around Oxford for some time. On 17 April 1588 he was elected a proctor and in July 1596 and again in July 1597 was chosen Vice-Chancellor of the University of Oxford. In 1591 he was admitted to the rectory of Merstham, Surrey, and from 27 December of the same year until May 1598 was vicar of All Hallows, Barking. From February 1593 till 1607 he was a prebendary of Westminster, and from 1596 until 1605 an authoritarian Dean of Christ Church. As Dean he commuted the commons allowance for food into monetary form, of two shillings a week. Some of those who resisted this innovation he expelled, others he sent before the council, and others he imprisoned.

On 7 July 1598 he became vicar of Islip, and in the following October vicar of Wittenham Abbas, Berkshire. He was one of the six deans who attended the Hampton Court Conference in 1604, and later supplied notes for William Barlow's account, the Sum and Substance of the Conference. He was then involved in the subsequent creation of the King James Bible, being appointed one of the Oxford committee deputed to translate part of the New Testament. Also in that year, he was elected prolocutor of the lower house of Convocation.

== Episcopal career ==
In October 1604 Ravis was appointed Bishop of Gloucester and consecrated on 17 March 1605; he was allowed to hold in commendam with his bishopric the deanery of Christ Church, his Westminster prebend, and the parsonages of Islip and Wittenham. At Gloucester he improved the Bishop's Palace. On 18 May 1607 Ravis was translated to the episcopal see of London and installed as Bishop of London on 2 June. He was intolerant of all nonconformity. Ravis died on 14 December 1609, and was buried in the north aisle of St Paul's Cathedral.

== Notes ==
Academic offices
Preceded by William James	Dean of Christ Church, Oxford; 1596–1605	Succeeded by John King
Church of England titles
Preceded by Godfrey Goldsborough	Bishop of Gloucester; 1604–1607	Succeeded by Henry Parry
Preceded by Richard Vaughan	Bishop of London; 1607–1609	Succeeded by George Abbot
