= Martin Benson (bishop) =

English churchman

The Right Reverend Martin Benson
- Bishop of Gloucester
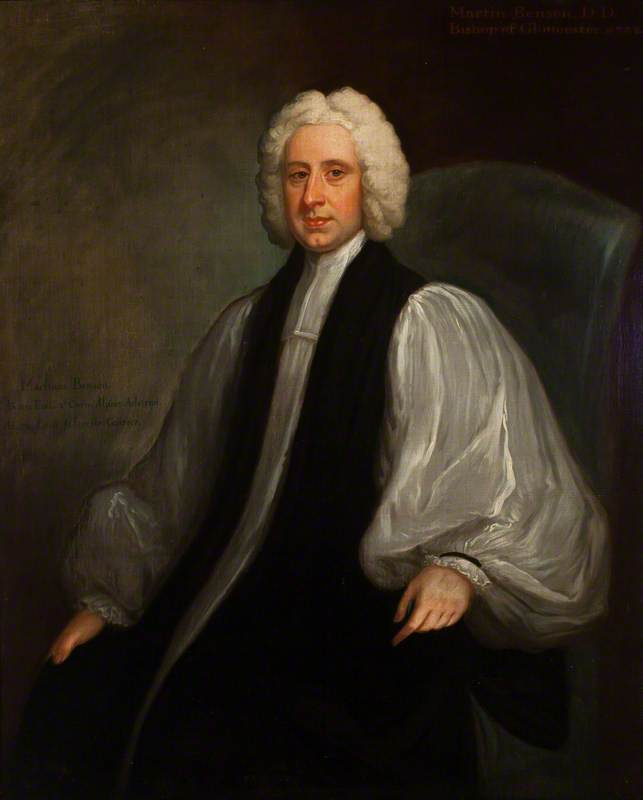
- Portrait by Jonathan Richardson
- Diocese: Diocese of Gloucester
- In office: 1734–1752
- Predecessor: Elias Sydall
- Successor: James Johnson

Personal details
- Born: 23 April 1689
- Died: 30 August 1752 (aged 63)
- Buried: Gloucester Cathedral
- Denomination: Anglican
- Education: Charterhouse School; Christ Church, Oxford

Martin Benson (1689–1752) was an English churchman, Archdeacon of Berkshire and Bishop of Gloucester.

== Life ==
He was the son of the Rev. John Benson, rector of Cradley, Herefordshire, and was born there on 23 April 1689. He was educated at Charterhouse School and at Christ Church, Oxford, of which he became a tutor; he matriculated in 1706, graduated B.A. in 1712 and M.A. in 1713. He subsequently travelled on the continent, where he met George Berkeley, his friend and correspondent for thirty years, and Thomas Secker, whose sister he married.

Soon after his return he became, in 1721, archdeacon of Berkshire. In 1724 he obtained one of the 'golden' prebends in Durham Cathedral; and in 1726 was made chaplain to the Prince of Wales. In 1727 he was presented to the rectory of Bletchley, and in 1728, on occasion of a royal visit to Cambridge, received the degree of D.D. In January 1735 he was nominated bishop of Gloucester; his friend and patron Lord Chancellor Charles Talbot, 1st Baron Talbot suffered the rejection of his previous nominee Thomas Rundle, whose promotion to Gloucester had been successfully opposed by Edmund Gibson, the Bishop of London.

On his appointment Benson declared his resolution to accept no higher preferment. He revived the institution of rural deans, repaved the choir of Gloucester Cathedral, added pinnacles to the lady chapel, and repaired the palace. He visited the diocese of York, under commission from the aging Archbishop Lancelot Blackburne, who left him a service of plate by his will. He tended Bishop Joseph Butler in his last illness, died a few months later on 30 August 1752, and was buried in his cathedral. Alexander Pope celebrated him along with his friend Berkeley in the couplet:

Manners with candour are to Benson given,
To Berkeley every virtue under heaven.

His only publications were some separate sermons.

Benson was the Bishop who ordained George Whitefield, on June 20, 1736, who became the famous Methodist evangelist who broke from the Church of England and was a central figure in the First Great Awakening, which was vehemently opposed by the Church.

== Notes ==
Church of England titles
| Preceded by Elias Sydall | Bishop of Gloucester; 1734–1752 | Succeeded by James Johnson |
