= Hughes-Morgan baronets =

Baronetcy in the Baronetage of the United Kingdom

The Hughes-Morgan Baronetcy, of Penally in the County of Pembroke, is a title in the Baronetage of the United Kingdom. It was created on 27 June 1925 for Sir David Hughes-Morgan, Chairman of the Western Mail. Born David Morgan, he assumed by deed poll the additional surname of Hughes in 1925.

The third baronet was a major-general in the British Army.

== Hughes-Morgan baronets, of Penally (1925) ==
- Sir David Hughes-Morgan, 1st Baronet (1871–1941)
- Sir John Vernon Hughes-Morgan, 2nd Baronet (1900–1969)
- Sir David John Hughes-Morgan, 3rd Baronet (1925–2006)
- Sir Ian Parry David Hughes-Morgan, 4th Baronet (born 1960)

The heir presumptive is the present holder's brother Jonathan Michael Vernon Hughes-Morgan (born 1962). The heir presumptive's heir apparent is his son James Hughes-Morgan (born 1999).
