= James Dallaway =

English antiquary, topographer and miscellaneous writer

Rev. James Dallaway
- Born: 20 February 1763; Bristol, England
- Died: 6 June 1834 (aged 71); Leatherhead, Surrey, England
- Education: Trinity College, Oxford
- Notable work: Constantinople, Ancient and Modern, with Excursions to the Shores and Islands of the Archipelago and to the Troad (1797)

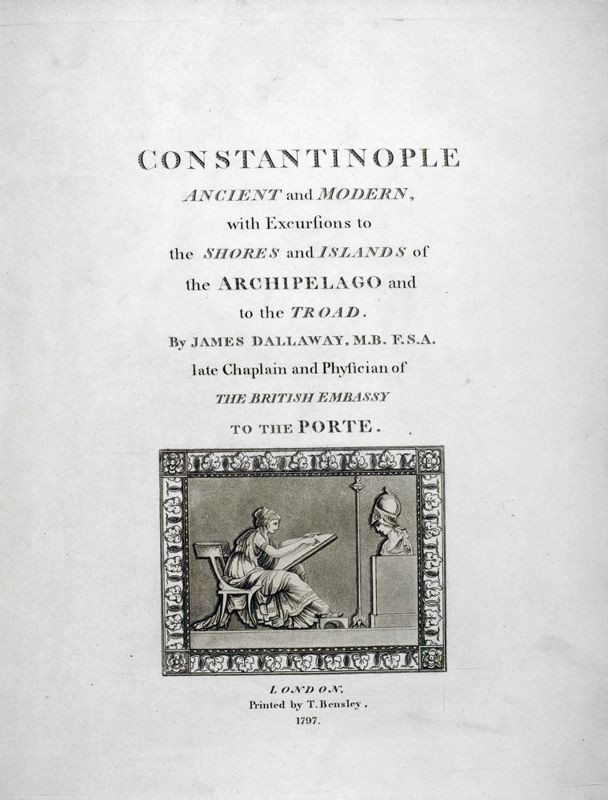
Constantinople Ancient and Modern, by Dallaway

The Rev. Prebendary James Dallaway FSA (20 February 1763 – 6 June 1834) was an English antiquary, topographer, and miscellaneous writer. He is known for his account of Constantinople and the Greek islands, published in 1797; and his county history of the western parts of Sussex, of which he published two volumes in 1815–19.

== Early life and education ==
Dallaway was born at Bristol on 20 February 1763, the only son of James Dallaway (1730–87)), banker of Stroud, Gloucestershire, and his wife Martha (1739–83), younger daughter of Richard Hopton of Worcester. He was educated at Cirencester Grammar School, and then at Trinity College, Oxford, from where he graduated BA in 1782, and MA in 1784. He failed to obtain a fellowship there, supposedly because he had written some satirical verses on a senior and influential member of the college.

== Career ==
Having been ordained deacon in 1785, Dallaway served as a curate at Rodmarton, Gloucestershire (serving under the Rev. Samuel Lysons, father of the antiquaries, Daniel and Samuel), and afterwards Rodborough in the same county. He lived at this time in a house called "The Fort" in Stroud.

He subsequently lived at Gloucester, and from about 1785 to 1794 was employed as the editor of Ralph Bigland's county history, Historical, Monumental, and Genealogical Collections relative to the County of Gloucester, which had been left unpublished at Bigland's death. He saw two volumes into print, but the arrangement ended when he quarrelled acrimoniously with Bigland's son, Richard. He was elected a fellow of the Society of Antiquaries of London in 1789; and in 1793 he published Inquiries into the Origin and Progress of the Science of Heraldry in England, with Explanatory Observations on Armorial Ensigns. He returned to Oxford, where he studied medicine at the Radcliffe Infirmary, graduating MB in December 1793.

He had dedicated his Origin and Progress of Heraldry to Charles Howard, 11th Duke of Norfolk, the Earl Marshal, and through the Duke's influence he was appointed chaplain and physician to the British embassy to the Ottoman Empire led by Robert Liston. He travelled overland through the Balkans to Istanbul; and returned via the Greek islands and Italy at the end of 1795. He subsequently published two works based on this trip, both of which were well received: Constantinople, ancient and modern (1797); and an Itinerary of his journey through the Balkans (1805). He had hoped to write a continuation of Gibbon's Decline and Fall of the Roman Empire, but lost most of his notes in transit. The journey also let to his being invited to prepare an edition of the writings of Lady Mary Wortley Montagu (wife of an earlier ambassador to Istanbul): however, the result, published in five volumes in 1803, has been described by a later editor as "shockingly incompetent".

On 1 January 1797 Dallaway was appointed secretary to the Earl Marshal. This post, which he retained until his death, brought him into close contact with the College of Arms. In 1799 the Duke presented him to the rectory of South Stoke, Sussex, which he resigned in 1803 when he was offered the nearby vicarage of Slinfold, in the patronage of the see of Chichester. In 1801, in exchange for the rectory of Llanmaes, Glamorganshire, which had been given to him by the Marquess of Bute, he obtained the vicarage of Leatherhead, Surrey. He held the two benefices of Leatherhead and Slinfold until his death; and from 1811 to 1826 he also held a prebend in Chichester Cathedral.

== Death ==
Dallaway died at Leatherhead on 6 June 1834.

== Works ==
After his return from the East he published Constantinople, Ancient and Modern, with Excursions to the Shores and Islands of the Archipelago and to the Troad (1797). The work was translated into German (Chemnitz, 1800; Berlin and Hamburg, 1801).

In 1811 Dallaway was engaged by the Duke of Norfolk to edit a History of the three Western Rapes of Sussex, for which manuscript collections had been assembled by Sir William Burrell, and deposited in the British Museum. The first volume, containing the Rape and City of Chichester, was published in 1815; and the first part of the second volume, containing the Rape of Arundel, in 1819. The work was completed by the Rev. Edmund Cartwright, who published his volume on the Rape of Bramber in 1830. However, the contributions of both authors have been criticised for their inaccuracies.

Other publications included:

- Anecdotes of the Arts in England, or Comparative Remarks on Architecture, Sculpture, and Painting, chiefly illustrated by specimens at Oxford (1800)
- Observations on English Architecture, Military, Ecclesiastical, and Civil, compared with similar buildings on the Continent (1806; revised edition, 1834)
- Statuary and Sculpture among the Ancients, with some account of Specimens preserved in England (London, 1816) (Three hundred and fifty copies of this work were printed, but two hundred of them were destroyed by fire at Thomas Bensley's printing-office.)
- History of Leatherhead, privately printed, prefixed to his wife Harriet Dallaway's Etchings of Views in the Vicarage of Leatherhead (1821)
- William Wyrcestre Redivivus: Notices of Ancient Church Architecture in the Fifteenth Century, particularly in Bristol (1823) (An edition of part of the Itinerary of William Worcester.)
- Account of all the Pictures exhibited in the Rooms of the British Institution from 1813 to 1824, belonging to the Nobility and Gentry of England, with remarks critical and explanatory (1824)
- Discourses upon Architecture in England from the Norman Conquest to the Reign of Elizabeth (1833)
- Antiquities of Bristow in the Middle Centuries (Bristol, 1834)

=== Edited works ===
- Letters of the late Dr. Rundle, Bishop of Derry, to Mrs. Sandys, with introductory Memoirs (2 vols, 1789)
- The Letters and other Works of Lady Mary Wortley Montagu, from her original MSS., with Memoirs of her Life (5 vols, 1803)
- Walpole's Anecdotes of Painting, including George Vertue's "Catalogue of Engravers" (5 vols, 1826–8).

== Family ==
Dallaway married Harriet Anne Jefferis, daughter of John Jefferis, alderman of Gloucester, in 1800. She shared many of her husband's interests, publishing Etchings of Views in the Vicarage of Leatherhead (with text by James) in 1821; and A Manual of Heraldry for Amateurs in 1828. She survived James, dying in 1867.

The couple had one child, Harriet Jane Dallaway, born in 1816.

== Bibliography ==
- Farrant, John H. (2011) [2004]. "Dallaway, James (1763–1834)". Oxford Dictionary of National Biography (online ed.). Oxford University Press. doi:10.1093/ref:odnb/7040. (subscription required)
- Harvey, J.H.; Benger, F.B. (1957–66). "James Dallaway, antiquary, vicar of Leatherhead, 1804–1834". Proceedings of the Leatherhead and District Local History Society. 2: 214–19.
- Hope, T.J. (1974). "The travels of the Rev. James Dallaway in the Ottoman empire: some unpublished correspondence with Robert Liston". Sussex Archaeological Collections. 112: 9–14. doi:10.5284/1085494.
- Hope, T.J. (1974). "John Sibthorp's last expedition to the Balkans: the accounts of Sibthorp and Dallaway about their travels in 1794". Revue des études sud-est Européenes. 12: 87–102.
- Steer, F.W. (1965). "Memoir and letters of James Dallaway, 1763–1834". Sussex Archaeological Collections. 103: 1–48. doi:10.5284/1085382.
- Steer, F.W. (1967). "Memoir and letters of James Dallaway, 1763–1834: a postscript". Sussex Archaeological Collections. 105: 62–9.

Attribution

This article incorporates text from a publication now in the public domain: "Dallaway, James". Dictionary of National Biography. London: Smith, Elder & Co. 1885–1900.
