= David Hughes-Morgan =

Welsh solicitor and landowner

Major Sir David Hughes-Morgan, 1st Baronet (born David Hughes Morgan; 16 August 1871 – 16 March 1941) was a Welsh solicitor and landowner.

Hughes Morgan was born in Llandovery, Carmarthenshire. He was educated at Queen's College, Oxford and qualified as a solicitor, becoming a junior partner with Riddell, Vaizey and Smith in London.

After inheriting the estates of his uncle, Colonel John Morgan of Brecon, he retired from the law and returned home to Wales to administer them. He was High Sheriff of Breconshire for 1899 and mayor of Tenby eight times, and for this he was knighted in the 1920 New Year Honours and created a Baronet in the 1925 Birthday Honours. He also unsuccessfully contested Tenby Boroughs as a Conservative.

He was commissioned into the 3rd (Royal South Wales Borderers Militia) Battalion, South Wales Borderers in 1891, and was promoted lieutenant in 1893 and captain in 1907. During the Boer War he commanded a prisoner of war camp in Ireland. He resigned his commission in 1906, but in 1907 joined the 1st (Volunteer) Battalion (later the Brecknockshire Battalion), resigning in 1911. During the First World War he returned to his regiment to command a musketry training camp in Pembrokeshire, retiring with the rank of major.

He changed his surname to the hyphenated Hughes-Morgan by deed poll in 1925.

== Footnotes ==
Baronetage of the United Kingdom
New creation	Baronet (of Penally); 1925–1941	Succeeded by John Hughes-Morgan
