= Robert Hill (priest) =

English clergyman

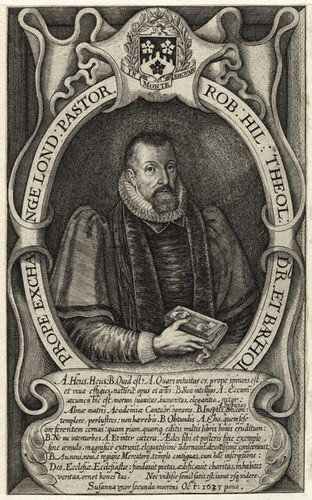
Robert Hill, 17th-century engraving.

Robert Hill (died 1623) was an English clergyman, a conforming Puritan according to Anthony Milton.

== Life ==
He was a native of Ashbourne, Derbyshire. He was educated at Christ's College, Cambridge, and graduated B.A. in 1584, M.A. in 1586. In 1588-9 he was admitted fellow of St. John's College, Cambridge, and from about 1591 to 1602 was perpetual curate of St Andrew's Church, Norwich. He found Norwich full of preaching, and attributed this in part to the mayor, Francis Rugge.

Hill took an active part in the disputed election to the mastership of St. John's in 1595. By October 1601 he was chaplain to Lord Chief Justice John Popham. Having commenced B.D. in 1595, he was incorporated at Oxford on 10 July 1605. In 1602 he became lecturer of St. Martin-in-the-Fields in London, and on 15 September 1607 rector of St. Margaret Moyses, Friday Street. In 1609 he proceeded D. D. On 24 February 1613 he was preferred by Lord Chancellor Ellesmere to the well-endowed rectory of St. Bartholomew Exchange, and resigned his other cure.

Hill died in August 1623, and was buried by his desire near his first wife in the chancel of St. Bartholemew. He married, first, between 1613 and 1615, Margaret, daughter of John(?) Witts of Ghent, and widow of Adrian de Saravia, who died in childbed on 29 June 1615, aged 39. Her death was mourned by Joshua Sylvester. Hill's second wife, Susan, apparently the sister of Thomas Westfield, survived him.

== Works ==
Hill was author of:

- Life everlasting; or the trve knowledge of the One Jehovah, Three Elohim, and Iesvs Immanvel: collected ovt of the best modern Divines, and compiled into one volume, Cambridge 1601.
- Christs Prayer expounded, a Christian directed, and a Communicant prepared … To which is added a Preface of Prayer, a pithie Prayer for Christian Families, &., 8vo, London 1606. Hill afterwards issued a greatly enlarged edition, under the title of The Pathway to Prayer and Pietie. Containing (1) An Exposition of the Lords Prayer …; (2) A Preparation to the Lords Supper, with Ma. Zanchius Confession concerning that Sacrament; (3) A Direction to a Christian Life; (4) An Instruction to die well, 2 pts, London 1613. To the sixth edition (5 pts, London 1615-16) is appended Joshua Sylvester's Elegie on the death of Margaret Hill. The eighth edition (1629) contains The Protestation of J. White written to the end the Papists might understand he departed out of this world of the same opinion. From the plan of this manual Jeremy Taylor may have derived that of his Holy Living and Dying.

Hill translated from the Latin of William Bucanus Institvtions of Christian Religion, London, 1606, and edited William Perkins's Godly Exposition upon the three first chapters of the Revelation, London, 1607. In the fourth part of the Workes of Richard Greenham London, 1612, is An Exposition of the 119 Psalme found unperfect and perfected by R. Hill. He also collected the posthumous sermons and lectures of Samuel Hieron, and published them in 1620 as the second volume of Hieron's works. Hill has Latin verses before Foulk Robartes's The Revenue of the Gospel in Tythes, 1613.
