= Watkin Herbert =

16th-century Welsh politician

Watkin or Walter Herbert (by 1517 – 1564 or later), of Crickhowel and Cilhelyg, Breconshire, was a Welsh politician.

He was the son of William Thomas Herbert of Crickhowel.

He was appointed High Sheriff of Breconshire for 1541–42 and 1547–48 and High Sheriff of Monmouthshire for 1551–52. He was elected a Member of Parliament (MP) for Breconshire in 1558.

He married Margaret, the daughter of Morgan Thomas Hir, and had at least one son.
