= Godfrey Goodman =

British Anglican bishop

- Bishop of Gloucester
- Diocese: Diocese of Gloucester
- In office: 1625 – 1646 (deprived)
- Predecessor: Miles Smith
- Successor: vacant (Commonwealth)
- Other posts: Dean of Rochester (1621–1625); Bishop-elect of Hereford (1633/34)

Orders
- Consecration: 1625

Personal details
- Born: Ruthin, Denbighshire, Wales
- Died: 19 January 1656
- Denomination: Anglican
- Education: Trinity College, Cambridge

Godfrey Goodman (28 February 1582 or 1583 – 19 January 1656), also known as Hugh, was the Anglican Bishop of Gloucester, and a member of the Church of England. He was the son of Godfrey Goodman (senior) and Jane Croxton, landed gentry living in Wales. His contemporaries describe him as being a hospitable, quiet man, and lavish in his charity to the poor.

== Education and career ==
Goodman was born in Ruthin, Denbighshire. From 1593, Goodman was originally educated at Ruthin School but was later sent to Westminster School, where he remained seven years under the protection of his uncle, Gabriel Goodman, Dean of Westminster. He was an earnest student and when only seventeen won a scholarship at Trinity College, Cambridge. He graduated there in 1604 and shortly after was ordained at Bangor, Wales.

Goodman's first appointment was to the rectory of Stapleford Abbotts, Essex, in 1606. He made rapid progress in the Church, and was made successively prebend of Westminster in 1607; Rector of West Isley, Berkshire, in 1616; Rector of Kinnerton, Gloucester; Canon of Windsor and prebendary of Hatherton, Staffordshire in St Peter's Collegiate Church, Wolverhampton in 1617; Dean of Rochester in 1621; and finally Bishop of Gloucester, 1625–1646. His election to the See of Gloucester was confirmed on 5 March 1625 and he was consecrated a bishop the following day. In addition, he held two livings in Wales, at Llandyssil and Llanarmon. Even as a bishop, he was allowed to retain most of these appointments. In late 1633/early 1634, he was elected Bishop of Hereford, but refused the election and continued in Gloucester.

== Involvement with Catholicism ==
Goodman became one of the Court preachers and was chaplain to Queen Anne, wife of James I. His leaning towards Roman Catholicism made enemies for him at Windsor, and he was reprimanded by the King over Court sermons. A few years later, he was severely reprimanded for having erected a crucifix at Windsor and using altar-cloths with a cross design in his own cathedral at Gloucester, and further for having suspended a minister who insisted on preaching "that all who die papists go inevitably to hell".

Doubts were likely arising in his mind about the legitimacy of the Church's separation from Rome, and he sought the society of Catholic priests who were in hiding throughout the country. He was frequently at variance with Archbishop Laud, and in 1640 refused on conscientious grounds to sign the seventeen Articles drawn up by the Archbishop. He was thereupon arrested, but after five weeks in prison he overcame his scruples and signed the Articles. This, however, availed him little, as he was soon impeached by Parliament along with Laud and the ten other signatories of the Articles and was sent to prison for treason in the Tower of London for four months.

In 1643, Goodman's episcopal palace was pillaged by parliamentarian soldiers and over the course of a couple of years he was stripped of all his emoluments. He withdrew from public life to his small Welsh estate in Carnarvon, and it is likely that he converted to Catholicism at this time. He was deprived of his See by Parliament on 9 October 1646, as episcopacy was abolished for the duration of the Commonwealth and the Protectorate.

In about 1650, he came to London, and gave himself up to study and research; he was befriended by some Catholic royalists and lived in close connection with them until his death in 1656. Father Davenport OSF, former chaplain to Queen Henrietta, was his confessor and attended him in his last illness. He died, aged 62 or 63, at Westminster. By his will, in which he made a profession of his Catholic faith, he left most of his property to Ruthin, his native town; his manuscripts and books, however, were given to Trinity College, Cambridge.

"After a few years, when we had experience of the Scottish government, then-in disparagement of the Scots and in hate and detestation of them-the Queen did seem to revive. Then her memory much magnified-such ringing of bells, such public joy and sermons in commemoration of her, the picture of her tomb painted in many churches; and in effect, more solemnity and joy in memory of her coronation than wad for the coming in of King James". - Goodman

== Principal works ==
- The Fall of Man, or the Corruption of Nature proved by the light of his Natural Reason (1616)
- The two mysteries of the Christian Religion, the Trinity and the Incarnation, explicated (1653)
- Arguments and animadversions on Dr. George Hakewil's Apology
- The Creatures praysing God (1622)
- The Court of King James the First by Sir A.W. reviewed

Goodman's 1620s prose text, "See, see the Word is incarnate", describing the life of Christ, was set to music by the English composer Orlando Gibbons as a verse anthem.

== Bibliography ==
- Godfrey Goodman, Bishop of Gloucester - Geoffrey Soden, SPCK 1953

Church of England titles
Preceded by Miles Smith	Bishop of Gloucester; 1625–1646 (deprived)	abolished until 1660; William Nicholson
