= Robert Frampton =

British bishop (1622–1708)

The Right Reverend Robert Frampton
- Bishop of Gloucester
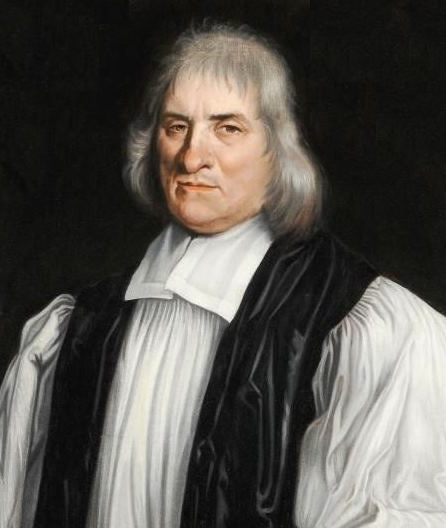
- Church: Church of England
- Diocese: Diocese of Gloucester
- In office: 1681–1691
- Predecessor: John Pritchett
- Successor: Edward Fowler
- Other post: Dean of Gloucester (1673–1681)

Orders
- Consecration: 27 March 1681 by William Sancroft

Personal details
- Born: 26 February 1622 Pimperne, Dorset
- Died: 25 May 1708 (aged 86) Standish, Gloucestershire
- Denomination: Anglican
- Education: Corpus Christi College, Oxford; Christ Church, Oxford

Robert Frampton (26 February 1622 – 25 May 1708) was Bishop of Gloucester in England from 1681 to 1691 and later a Non-juror.

== Life ==
Frampton was born in Dorset in February 1622, to Robert and Elizabeth Frampton. He studied at Corpus Christi College and Christ Church, Oxford, where he received his B.A. in 1641. (He was later awarded the D.D., in 1673).

During the English Civil War, during which he attempted to remain neutral, he served as master of the free school at Gillingham, Dorset, and was privately ordained by Robert Skinner, bishop of Oxford. He then served as minister at Gillingham and later as chaplain to the Earl of Elgin in Bedfordshire. From there he took a position as chaplain to the Levant Company at Aleppo, Syria, in 1655.

Following his return from the Middle East in 1666, he married Mary Canning of Warwickshire in 1667. He returned to Aleppo soon after his marriage and stayed there until 1670. Returning to London in 1671, he was appointed Preacher of the Rolls Chapel and chaplain to the Lord Keeper. He was made a prebendary of Gloucester and Salisbury in 1672 and rector of Okeford Fitzpaine in Dorset.

In 1673 he was made Dean of Gloucester and in 1681 Bishop of Gloucester. During his years as bishop he preached at Whitehall for James II. His preaching against Roman Catholicism incurred the king's displeasure, as did Frampton's decision not to instal the candidate of the Catholic President of Magdalen College, Oxford, to the living of Slimbridge. An opponent of James's Declaration of Indulgence in 1688, Frampton was to join Archbishop William Sancroft's delegation that petitioned the king to revoke the Indulgence, but a delay in travel prevented him from being numbered among the Seven Bishops imprisoned in the Tower of London.

Despite his opposition to James II's Catholic policies, he refused the oaths to William III and Mary II and suffered deprival in 1691. A moderate Non-juror, he joined Thomas Ken in strongly opposing the continuance of the Nonjuring schism through the consecration of George Hickes and Thomas Wagstaffe as bishops of a new nonjuring line. In his retirement he continued officiating at the parish church at Standish, Gloucestershire.

He died at his home at Standish on 25 May 1708, being buried on the north side of the altar in the parish church.

Church of England titles
| Preceded by Thomas Vyner | Dean of Gloucester; 1673–1681 | Succeeded by Thomas Marshall |
| Preceded by John Pritchett | Bishop of Gloucester; 1681–1691 | Succeeded by Edward Fowler |
