= Edward Fowler (bishop) =

English churchman

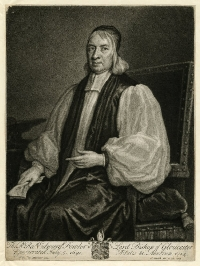
Bishop Fowler.

Edward Fowler (1632 – 26 August 1714) was an English churchman, Bishop of Gloucester from 1691 until his death.

== Early life and education ==
He was born at Westerleigh, Gloucestershire, and was educated at Corpus Christi College, Oxford, later moving to Trinity College, Cambridge.

== Writings ==
Fowler was suspected of Pelagian tendencies, and his earliest book was a Free Discourse in defence of The Practices of Certain Moderate Divines called Latitudinarians (1670). This supported Samuel Parker and his Discourse of Ecclesiastical Polity of 1669. It also took aim at Thomas Hobbes, by means of positions set out by Daniel Scargill, an apostate Hobbist.

The Design of Christianity, published in the following year, in which he laid stress on the moral design of revelation, was criticized by Richard Baxter in his How far Holiness is the Design of Christianity (1671) and by John Bunyan in his Defence of the Doctrine of Justification by Faith (1672). Bunyan described the Design as "a mixture of Popery, Socinianism and Quakerism," an accusation to which Fowler replied in a scurrilous pamphlet entitled Dirt Wip'd Off. He also published, in 1693, Twenty-Eight Propositions, by which the Doctrine of the Trinity is endeavoured to be explained, challenging with some success the Socinian position.

== Offices ==
He was successively rector of St. Mary the Virgin's Church, Northill, Bedfordshire (1656) and of All Hallows, Bread Street, London (1673), and in 1676 was elected a canon of Gloucester; his friend, Henry More, one of the Cambridge Platonists, resigned in his favour. In 1681 he became vicar of St Giles, Cripplegate, but after four years was suspended for being a Whig. When the Declaration of Indulgence was published in 1687 he successfully influenced the London clergy against reading it.

== Bishopric ==
In 1691 he was consecrated Bishop of Gloucester and held the see until his death.

Church of England titles
Preceded by Robert Frampton	Bishop of Gloucester; 1691–1714	Succeeded by Richard Willis
