= Kinnersley Castle =

Castle in the UK

Coordinates: 52.141°N 2.957°W

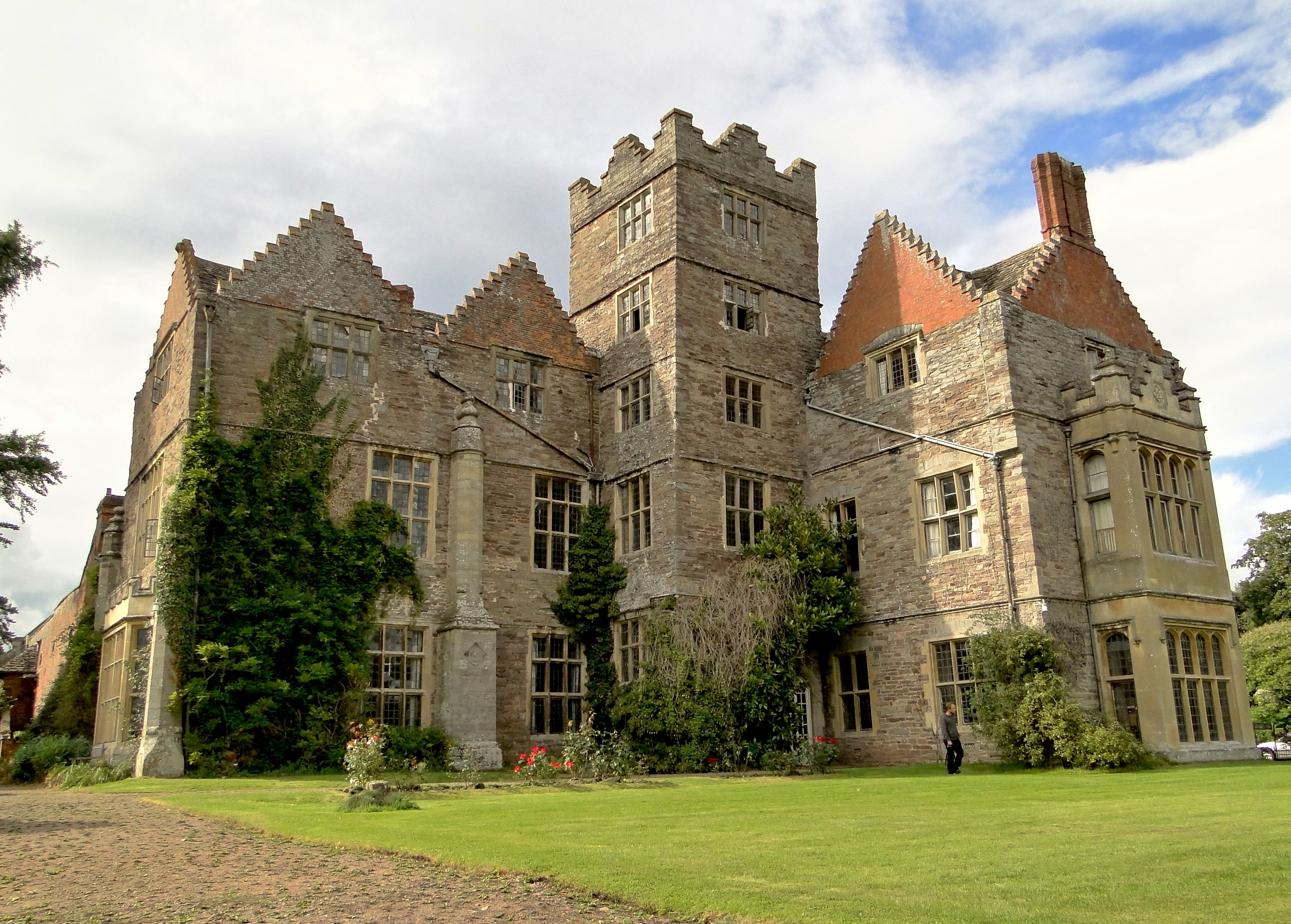
Kinnersley Castle, 2013

Kinnersley Castle in Herefordshire, England, is one of the many marches castles along the Welsh Borders.

The Castle of Kinnersley, on the A4112 3 km (1.9 mi) east of Eardisley, was originally a stone structure, thought to have been built during the reign of Henry I of England (1100-1135 C.E.). The Elizabethan building that now occupies the site has obliterated all but a few traces of the medieval castle. Although it looks predominantly Elizabethan on the outside, it has many features of different periods.

It was bought by Roger Vaughan in 1588. It was 'renovated' in the 16th century by the Vaughn family and houses a fine example of an intricate plasterwork ceiling in the solar, thought to be one of the oldest in Herefordshire. There are many green men and serpent hounds to be found on the ceiling of said solar, a lot of the detail is picked out in gold. On the stone overmantel of the fireplace, carved into the stone is a boy's head with a serpent around its neck.

Roger's son, John Vaughan inherited the castle, but then sold it to Francis Smallman

Kinnersley Castle is the registered address of The Mereon Legacy CIC, a Community Interest Company, set up to hold the intellectual property rights related to the Mereon Matrix, and to "further explore, describe, understand and disseminate" knowledge related to this dynamic, three-dimensıonal geometric model which is composed of two many faced polyhedra.
