= William Nicholson (English bishop) =

English clergyman (1591–1672)

The Right Reverend William Nicholson
- Bishop of Gloucester
- Church: Church of England
- Province: Province of Canterbury
- Diocese: Diocese of Gloucester
- Installed: 1661
- Term ended: 1672

Orders
- Consecration: 6 January 1661 by Gilbert Sheldon, Accepted Frewen and John Cosin

Personal details
- Born: 1 November 1591
- Died: February 5, 1672 (aged 80)
- Buried: lady-chapel at Gloucester
- Spouse: Elizabeth Nicholson
- Education: Magdalen College, Oxford

William Nicholson (1 November 1591 – 5 February 1672) was an English clergyman, a member of the Westminster Assembly and Bishop of Gloucester.

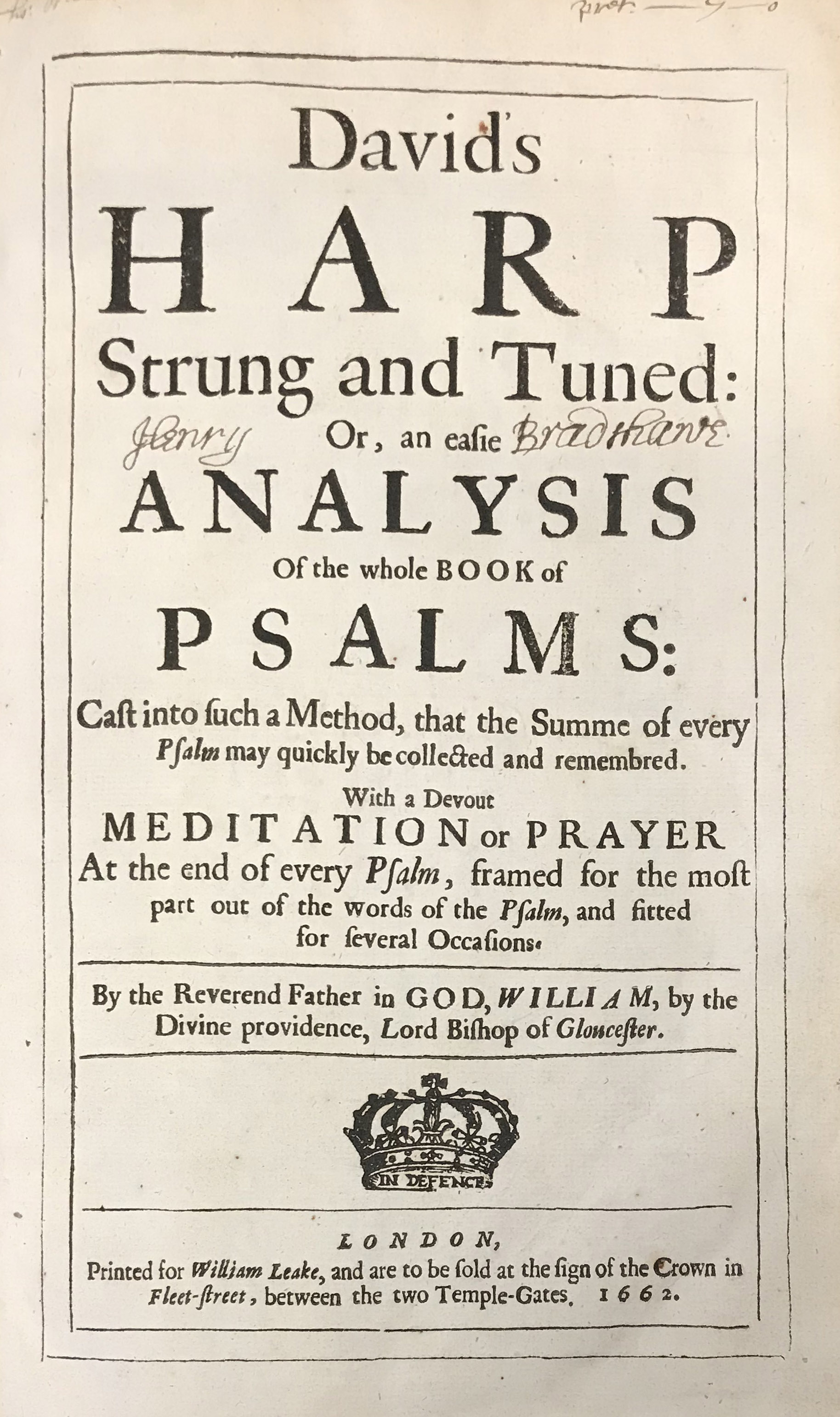
Title page of David's Harp Strung and tuned by William Nicholson

== Life ==
The son of Christopher Nicholson, a rich clothier, he was born at Stratford St. Mary, Suffolk, on 1 November 1591. He became a chorister of Magdalen College, Oxford, in 1598, and received his education in the grammar school attached to the college. He graduated B.A. in 1611, and M.A. 1615. He was a bible clerk of the college from 1612 to 1615. In 1614 he was appointed to the college living of New Shoreham, Sussex. He held the office of chaplain at Magdalen from 1616 to 1618. He was also chaplain to Henry Percy, 9th Earl of Northumberland, during his imprisonment in the Tower of London, from 1606 to 1621, and was tutor to his son, Lord Percy.

In 1616, he was appointed master of the free school at Croydon. He held the post until 1629, when he went to Wales, having been presented to the rectory of Llandilo-Vawr, in Carmarthenshire, in 1626. In 1644, he was made archdeacon of Brecon. The year before he had been nominated a member of the Westminster Assembly of divines, probably through the interest of the Earl of Northumberland, but he speedily withdrew, together with most of the rest of the Episcopalian clergy. When deprived of his preferments by the parliament he maintained himself by keeping a private school, which he carried on in partnership with Jeremy Taylor and William Wyatt at Newton Hall ('Collegium Newtoniense'), in the parish of Llanfihangel Aberbythych, in Carmarthenshire. One of his pupils was Judge John Powell. With Taylor, he wrote in the defence of the doctrine and discipline of the church of England, and in illustration of her teaching. His Exposition of the Apostles' Creed and Exposition of the Church Catechism were both written for the instruction of his former parishioners at Llandilo.

At the Restoration Nicholson returned to his parish, and resumed his former preferments, to which was added a residentiary canonry at St. Davids. In 1661 he was consecrated bishop of Gloucester by Gilbert Sheldon and Accepted Frewen on 6 January, in Henry VII's Chapel. He was allowed to hold his archdeaconry and canonry together with the living of Bishops Cleeve in commendam. He preached in Westminster Abbey on 20 December 1661, at the funeral of Bishop Nicolas Monk, who had been consecrated with him in the preceding January. He was appointed to the sinecure rectory of Llansantfraid-yn-Mechan in Montgomeryshire in 1663. According to Richard Baxter, though not a commissioner, he attended the meetings of the Savoy Conference, and spoke once or twice. His treatment of the nonconformists in his diocese was conciliatory; he connived at the preaching of those whom he had reason to respect, and offered a living to one of them if he would conform. He was the patron of George Bull, who at his request was presented by Lord Clarendon to a living in his diocese. In 1663, he caused a new font to be erected in Gloucester Cathedral, and dedicated it; for this he was attacked in a pamphlet, entitled More News from Rome. He died on 5 February 1672, aged 80, and was buried in a side chantry of the lady-chapel at Gloucester, in which his wife Elizabeth, who predeceased him on 20 April 1663, had also been interred. A monument was erected by his grandson, Owen Brigstocke, of Lechdenny, Carmarthenshire, with an epitaph by his friend George Bull, describing him as 'legenda scribens, faciens scribenda.' (English translation), 'Writing what should be read, doing what should be done.'

== Works ==
He published:

- A plain Exposition of the Church Catechism, 1655 (re-issued in the Library of Anglo-Catholic Theology).
- Apology for the Discipline of the Ancient Church, 1659.
- Plain Exposition of the Apostles' Creed (dedicated to Gilbert Sheldon), 1661.
- David's Harp Strung and Tuned: Or, An Easy Analysis of the Whole Book of Psalms, 1662.

Nicholson's name has been quoted as an authority in the controversy as to the authorship of Eikon Basilike. After her husband's death in 1662 the widow of John Gauden settled in Gloucester; on the occasion of her receiving communion, the bishop put the question to her, and she affirmed that it was written by her husband.

Church of England titles
Preceded by Godfrey Goodman vacancy from 1655	Bishop of Gloucester; 1660–1672	Succeeded by John Pritchet
