= Elias Sydall =

British bishop (1672–1733)

Elias Sydall (1672–1733) was an English bishop of St David's and bishop of Gloucester.

== Life ==
He was the son of a glover of Norwich. He matriculated at Corpus Christi College, Cambridge in 1688, graduating B.A. in 1692 and M.A. in 1695. He became D.D. in 1705. He was a Fellow of Corpus from 1696 to 1703.

He became chaplain to Archbishop Thomas Tenison in 1702. Subsequently, he had rectories in Kent: Biddenden (1702); Ivychurch from 1705; and Great Mongeham from 1707. He was a canon of Canterbury Cathedral from 1707 to 1728 (Stall IV).

He became Master of Harbledown Hospital in Kent, in 1711. He was chaplain to George I of Great Britain, from 1716 to 1728. He then became Dean of Canterbury in 1728, Bishop of St David's in 1731 (consecrated bishop 11 April 1731), and was translated Bishop of Gloucester on 2 November 1731. He died 24 December 1733 and was buried at St James, Westminster, London on 31 December 1733.

Church of England titles
Preceded by George Stanhope	Dean of Canterbury; 1728-1733	Succeeded by John Lynch
Preceded by Joseph Wilcocks	Bishop of Gloucester; 1731-1734	Succeeded by Martin Benson
Preceded by Richard Smalbroke	Bishop of St David's; 1732-1743	Succeeded by Nicholas Clagett
