= Roger Vaughan (of Clyro) =

Welsh politician

Roger Vaughan (1550–1607), of Court of Clyro, Radnorshire and Kynnersley, Herefordshire, was a Welsh politician. He was a member (MP) of the Parliament of England for Radnorshire in 1572.

He bought Kinnersley Castle, Herefordshire in 1588.

He was the son of Thomas ap Robert Fychan (English: Vaughan) of Llŷn, Caernarfonshire, and the brother of Richard Vaughan (1550–1607), a Calvinist Bishop of London. His son, John Vaughan of Kinnersley married Joan Baynham, daughter of Thomas Baynham.
