= Bishop of Gloucester =

Diocesan bishop in the Church of England

- Bishopric

anglican
- Arms of the Bishop of Gloucester: Azure, two keys addorsed in saltire the wards upwards or
- Incumbent: Rachel Treweek

Location
- Ecclesiastical province: Canterbury
- Residence: Bishopscourt, Gloucester

Information
- First holder: John Wakeman
- Established: 1541
- Diocese: Gloucester
- Cathedral: Gloucester Cathedral

The Bishop of Gloucester is the ordinary of the Church of England Diocese of Gloucester in the Province of Canterbury.

The diocese covers the County of Gloucestershire and part of the County of Worcestershire. The see's centre of governance is the City of Gloucester where the bishop's chair (cathedra) is located in the Cathedral Church of the Holy and Indivisible Trinity.

The bishop's residence is Bishopscourt, Gloucester; very near the Cathedral.

The office has been in existence since the foundation of the see in 1541 under King Henry VIII from part of the Diocese of Worcester.

On 5 August 2014, Martyn Snow, the suffragan Bishop of Tewkesbury, became acting bishop of Gloucester. On 15 June 2015 Rachel Treweek became the elected bishop of Gloucester, the first woman to serve as a diocesan bishop in the Church of England.

== List of bishops ==
Chronological list of the bishops of the Diocese of Gloucester.

(Dates in italics indicate de facto continuation of office)

Bishops of Gloucester
From	Until	Incumbent	Notes
1541	1549	John Wakeman	Previously last Abbot of Tewkesbury.
1550	1552	John Hooper	Translated to Worcester and Gloucester.
1552	1554	See dissolved and returned to Worcester diocese	
1554	1558	James Brooks	Died in office.
1558	1562	See vacant	
1562	1579	Richard Cheyney	Formerly a Prebendary of Westminster Abbey. Also held Bristol in commendam (1562–1579); died in office.
1579	1581	See vacant	
1581	1598	John Bullingham	Also Bishop of Bristol (1581–1589).
1598	1604	Godfrey Goldsborough	Formerly a Prebendary of Worcester.
1604	1607	Thomas Ravis	Formerly Dean of Queen's College, Oxford; elected 4 March 1604; translated to London.
1607	1610	Henry Parry	Formerly Dean of Chester; translated to Worcester.
1610	1612	Giles Thomson	Formerly Dean of Windsor; consecrated 9 June 1611; died in office.
1612	1624	Miles Smith	Formerly a Canon-resident of Hereford.
1625	1646	Godfrey Goodman	Formerly Dean of Rochester; sequestrated 1640 and formally deprived 1646; converted to Roman Catholicism and died in Rome in 1655.
1646	1660	See was abolished during the Commonwealth and the Protectorate.	
1660	1672	William Nicholson	Formerly Archdeacon of Brecon.
1672	1681	John Pritchett	Formerly Vicar of St Giles, Cripplegate.
1681	1690	Robert Frampton	Formerly Dean of Gloucester; deprived in 1690.
1691	1714	Edward Fowler	Formerly a Prebendary of Gloucester; died in office.
1715	1722	Richard Willis	Formerly Dean of Lincoln; translated to Salisbury.
1722	1731	Joseph Wilcocks	Formerly a Prebendary of Westminster; translated to Rochester.
1731	1733	Elias Sydall	Translated from St David's.
1734	1752	Martin Benson	Formerly a Prebendary of Durham.
1752	1759	James Johnson	Formerly a Canon-resident of St Paul's, London; translated to Worcester.
1759	1779	William Warburton	Formerly Dean of Bristol and preacher of Lincoln's Inn.
1779	1781	The Hon. James Yorke	Translated from St David's; translated to Ely.
1781	1789	Samuel Hallifax	Translated to St Asaph.
1789	1802	Richard Beadon	Formerly Archdeacon of London; translated to Bath & Wells.
1802	1815	George Huntingford	Formerly Warden of Winchester College; translated to Hereford.
1815	1824	Henry Ryder	Translated to Lichfield & Coventry.
1824	1830	Christopher Bethell	Translated to Exeter.
1830	1836	James Henry Monk	Translated to Gloucester and Bristol.
Bishops of Gloucester and Bristol Merged as a single see and diocese, 1836–1897
From	Until	Incumbent	Notes
1836	1856	James Henry Monk	Translated from Gloucester; died in office.
1856	1861	Charles Baring	Translated to Durham.
1861	1863	William Thomson	Previously Dean of Queen's College, Oxford; translated to York.
1863	1897	Charles Ellicott	Previously Dean of Exeter; translated to Gloucester.
Bishops of Gloucester
From	Until	Incumbent	Notes
1897	1905	Charles Ellicott	Hitherto Bishop of Gloucester & Bristol.
1905	1923	Edgar Gibson	
1923	1945	Arthur Headlam	
1946	1953	Clifford Woodward	Translated from Bristol.
1954	1962	Wilfred Askwith KCMG	Translated from Blackburn.
1962	1975	Basil Guy	Translated from Bedford.
1975	1992	John Yates	Translated from Whitby.
1992	1993	Peter Ball CGA	Translated from Lewes.
1993	2003	David Bentley	Translated from Lynn.
2004	2014	Michael Perham	Formerly Dean of Derby.
2014	2015	Martyn Snow	Acting diocesan bishop, as suffragan Bishop of Tewkesbury.
2015	incumbent	Rachel Treweek	Election confirmed 15 June 2015.

== Assistant bishops ==
Among those who have served as assistant bishops in the diocese were:

- 1892–?: Samuel Marsden (also Assistant Bishop of Bristol after 1897), former Bishop of Bathurst
- 1929 – 1954 (d.): James Palmer, former Bishop in Bombay
- Lumsden Barkway, former Bishop of St Andrews, Dunkeld and Dunblane, undertook some bishop's duties in Gloucestershire around 1954
- 1955–1956 (res.): Ronald O'Ferrall, Rector of Cranham; former Bishop in Madagascar and Assistant Bishop of Derby

Among those who have served as (honorary) assistant bishops in retirement have been:

- 2005 – 2020 (d.): Patrick Harris, retired Bishop of Southwell
- 2005 – 2011 (res.): Peter Vaughan, retired Bishop suffragan of Ramsbury
- 2005 – 2008 (d.): Jonathan Bailey, retired Bishop of Derby
