= Gulielmus Bucanus =

Swiss-French Calvinist theologian

Gulielmus Bucanus (Guillaume Du Buc, in English William Bucanus) (died 1603) was a Swiss-French Calvinist theologian. His Institutiones theologicae (Geneva, 1602) was one of the first systematic works of theology of the Reformed Church.

== Life ==
He was born at Rouen. He was a regent master at the Collège de Lausanne in 1564, and then was ordained deacon in 1568. He became pastor at Yverdon in 1571, and was theology professor at the Lausanne Academy from 1591. He was invited to a position at the Saumur Academy, but died before he could take it up.
