= Walter Offley =

English Anglican priest

Walter Offley (15 July 1682 – 18 August 1721) was an English Anglican priest, most notably Dean of Chester from 1718 until his death.

Offley was born in Crewe and educated at Oriel College, Oxford. He was also concurrently the Archdeacon of Staffordshire. He was Chaplain to Henry Herbert, 2nd Baron Herbert of Chirbury.

== Notes ==
Church of England titles
Preceded by Laurence Fogg	Dean of Chester; 1718–1721	Succeeded by Thomas Allen
