= Henry Parry (bishop of Worcester) =

English bishop

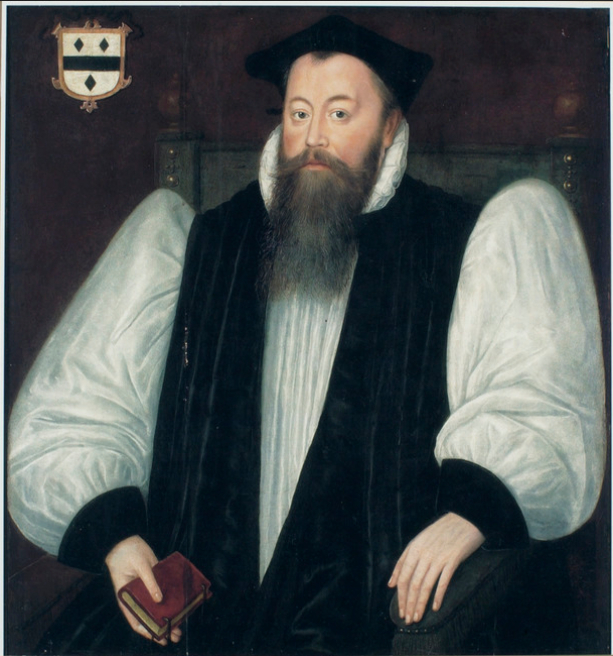
Henry Parry, portrait by Marcus Gheeraerts the Elder

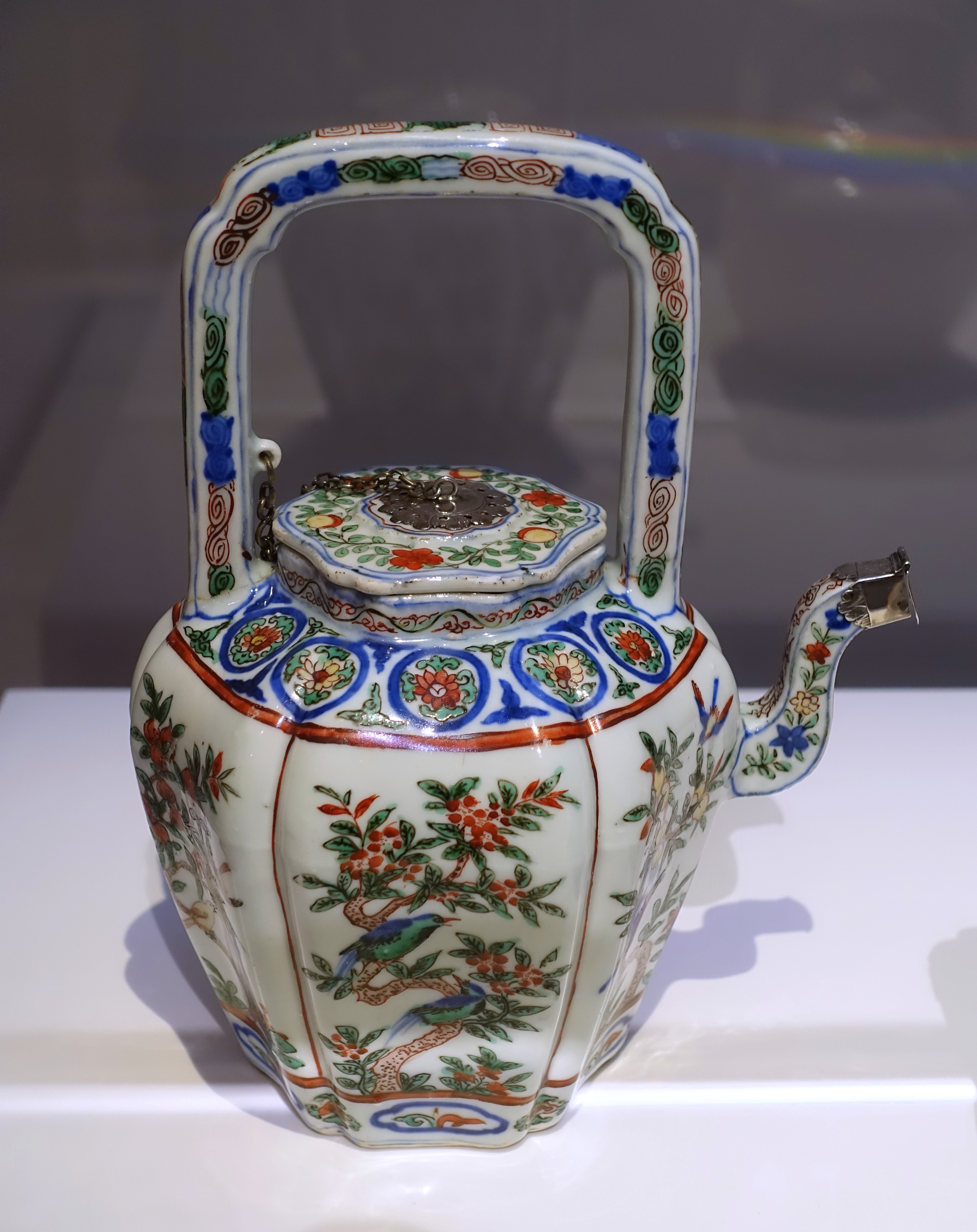
Teapot said to have been given by Elizabeth I of England to Henry Parry

Henry Parry (1561 – 12 December 1616) was an English bishop.

== Life ==
Parry was the son of Henry Parry, chancellor of Salisbury Cathedral. He was born in Wiltshire, and came as scholar to Corpus Christi College, Oxford in 1576. He graduated B.A. 1581, M.A. 1585, B.D. 1592, D.D. 1596, and became a Fellow of Corpus Christi in 1586, and served as Greek reader at Corpus Christi.

He was a friend of both Lancelot Andrewes and Richard Hooker, who was Fellow of Corpus Christi with him. With John Churchman he recovered the papers of Hooker, shortly after his death in 1600. He took part in the editorial group which met in 1601 to bring the final volumes of Hooker's Ecclesiastical Polity into their published form.

Archbishop Whitgift presented Parry to a series of vicarages in Kent: he was vicar of Monkton (1591–1594), rector of Great Mongeham (1594–1596), and rector of Chevening and Sundridge (1596–1610).

He was chaplain to Elizabeth I and was present at her deathbed, documented in the diary of John Manningham. A Ming period wucai tea kettle, said to have been given by the Queen to Parry, at a time when porcelain was rare in England, was sold in 2007 for over £1,000,000.

He was Dean of Chester from 1605 to 1607. He was Bishop of Gloucester from 1607 to 1610 and Bishop of Worcester from 1610 to 1616. There is an alabaster effigy of Parry in Worcester Cathedral.

== Works ==
Parry translated the Heidelberg Catechism into English, from the Latin version, with commentary by Zacharias Ursinus. This work appeared as The Summe of Christian Religion, first edition in Oxford in 1587, and often reprinted. In 1610 he translated into Latin The Summe of the Conference betwene John Rainoldes and John Hart (1584), the record of the disputation between John Rainolds and John Hart.

== Notes ==
Church of England titles
Preceded by William Barlow	Dean of Chester; 1605–1607	Succeeded by Thomas Mallory
Preceded by Thomas Ravis	Bishop of Gloucester; 1607–1610	Succeeded by Giles Thomson
Preceded by Gervase Babington	Bishop of Worcester; 1610–1616	Succeeded by John Thornborough
