= The Dean Trust =

UK multi academy trust

The Dean Trust (also known as: Dean Trust, TDT) is a multi-academy trust consisting of a group of schools spread across the North West of England. It ranges in many different levels of education across its eleven current schools.

It has several partnership programs, the most well-known being the partnerships with Manchester United at Ashton On Mersey School and with The Christie. It is led by its Chief Executive, Tarun Kapur CBE, and its chair, Brian Rigby MBE.

== Schools ==
There are eleven schools that are part of The Dean Trust, stretching around Manchester (in four different local authorities). Here is a map of all of the schools and a list of all the schools that are part of The Dean Trust as of 2024, as well as a fact about the school:

Key: (W) = West Hub, (E) = East Hub, (C) = Central Hub - as marked on the map below.

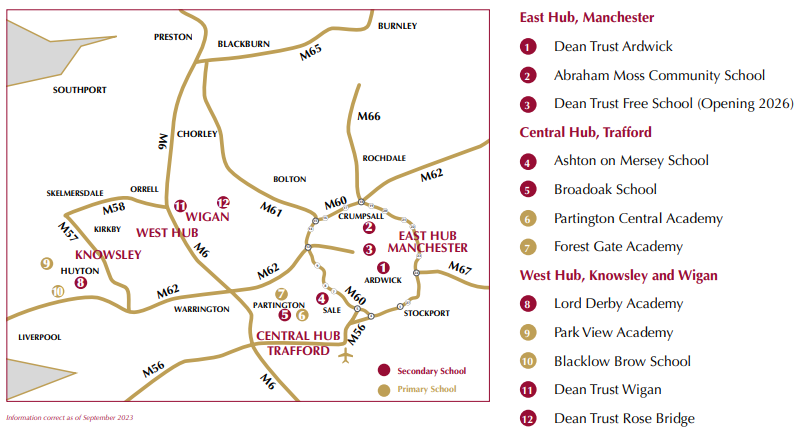
Map of The Dean Trust Schools

- Ashton-on-Mersey School - original school (C)
- Broadoak School - joined Ashton On Mersey in 2005 as part of the West Trafford Learning Partnership (C)
- Forest Gate Academy - joined in September 2012 to form The Dean Trust (C)
- Lord Derby Academy - joined in February 2014 as the first Knowsley school (W)
- Dean Trust Ardwick - joined in September 2015 to become the first Manchester school (E)
- Park View Academy - joined in 2016 as the second Dean Trust primary school (W)
- Partington Central Academy - joined in September 2016 as part of the Partington Learning Partnership (C)
- Dean Trust Wigan - joined in April 2017, as part of the Wigan Learning Partnership (W)
- Blacklow Brow - joined in September 2017 as a one-form-entry school (W)
- Dean Trust Rose Bridge - joined in February 2019 after over 100 years of educating (W)
- Abraham Moss Community School - joined in September 2023 as the first all-through school in the trust (E)

On the Ashton On Mersey site, there is also a sixth form and SCITT school.

== Fitness and leisure facilities ==
As well as providing educational services, outside of the school day The Dean Trust has a sporting selection for members of the public. These facilities are named Fitness and Leisure. These are located at Ashton on Mersey, Dean Trust Ardwick, Dean Trust Wigan, and Dean Trust Rose Bridge. The sports include Basketball, 5-a-side, 3G pitch, and Netball. There is also a gym they offer, which offers 1, 6, and 12 month payment plan options.

They also offer Sports Holiday Clubs and party options. The holiday clubs are aimed for children aged 6–12 years old and have a variety of different sports. The parties are either Football Parties or Dance Parties (ran by Prime Dance).

== Levels of Education ==
The Dean Trust operates schools of many different age groups. These age groups vary depending on the specific school, and which levels it can accommodate. Below is a list of different levels of education, and the Dean Trust schools that fit into the category in alphabetical order. Some schools have more than one level of education, and therefore will be mentioned in multiple layers

=== Primary School ===
- Abraham Moss Community School
- Blacklow Brow School
- Forest Gate Academy
- Partington Central Academy
- Park View Academy

=== Secondary School ===
- Abraham Moss Community School
- Dean Trust Ardwick
- Ashton On Mersey School
- Broadoak School
- Dean Trust Rose Bridge
- Dean Trust Wigan

=== Sixth form/College ===
- Ashton On Mersey School Sixth Form

=== Adult education ===
- Ashton On Mersey SCITT
- Dean Trust Wigan Budget Cooking

== Notable alumni ==
Below are a small selection of people who have attended a Dean Trust school.

Carl Austin-Behan - Politician - Abraham Moss Community School

Hassan Butt - Terrorist - Abraham Moss Community School

Marcus Rashford - Footballer - Ashton On Mersey

Yasmin Finney - actress - Ashton On Mersey

Karl Pilkington - comedian - Ashton On Mersey

Tim Stratford - archdeacon - Lord Derby Academy

Anthony Walker - attack victim - Lord Derby Academy

Stefan Ratchford - rugby player - Dean Trust Wigan
