= Lord Derby Academy =

Location
- Seel Road; Huyton, Merseyside, L36 6DG; England; 53.41232°N 2.83066°W

Information
- Type: Academy
- Motto: Believe•Achieve•Succeed
- Religious affiliation: None
- Department for Education URN: 140412 Tables
- Ofsted: Reports
- Chair: Tarun Kapur CBE
- Headteacher: Victoria Gowan
- Gender: Coeducational
- Age: 11 to 16
- Enrolment: 1100
- Capacity: 900
- Colours: Black, White, Burgundy
- Website: http://lordderbyacademy.thedeantrust.co.uk/

Lord Derby Academy (LDA) is a coeducational secondary school founded in the mid-20th century. It has an academy status and is located in Huyton in the English county of Merseyside.

Previously known in 1950s as Huyton Hey Secondary Modern School, it later became known asKnowsley Hey High School, in 2009 the school was merged with Bowring Comprehensive School to form Huyton Arts and Sports Centre for Learning (HASCL) on the same site as the original building and the school was completely rebuilt under the Building Schools for the Future programme. Due to both the fact that Bowring merged into Knowsley Hey and that the school was subsequently renamed and rebuilt, many consider HASCL a new successor to both schools. The school was completely rebuilt under the Building Schools for the Future programme.

In February 2014 the school converted to academy status and was renamed Lord Derby Academy (LDA), becoming part of The Dean Trust (which also includes Ashton-on-Mersey School in Sale as well as Broadoak School and Forest Gate Academy) in the process. In 2019 Lord Derby Academy was found to be "Requires Improvement" by Ofsted. They disagreed with this, which led to the delayed publication of the Ofsted Report. The report details how the leaders bear an over generous view of the school and how inadequate progress is being made by the pupils, at fault of the teachers. However, in 2023, the school was rated as being a "Good" school.

== Notable former pupils ==
=== Knowsley Hey School ===
- Conor McAleny, footballer
- Tim Stratford, Dean of Chester (former Archdeacon of Leicester)
- Anthony Walker, school student, murdered in 2005 by a classmate
- Malcolm Harrison,Museum Secretary, National Museums Liverpool 1986-2005
