= Arderne =

Arderne may refer to:

- Arderne Gardens, a public park in Cape Town, South Africa
- James Arderne (1636–1691), English dean of Chester
- John Arderne (1307–1392), English surgeon
- Joseph Arderne Ormerod (1848–1925), English physician and neurologist

== See also ==
- Ardern George Hulme Beaman (1857–1929), British author, diplomat and journalist
- Ardene, a Canadian clothing retailer
