= Henry Bridgeman =

Henry Bridgeman may refer to:

- Henry Bridgeman known as Henry Avery (1659 – after 1696), English pirate
- Henry Bridgeman (bishop) (1615–1682), Anglican clergyman, the bishop of Sodor and Man
- Henry Bridgeman, 1st Baron Bradford (1725–1800), British MP for Ludlow & (Much) Wenlock
- Henry Bridgeman (British Army officer) (1882–1972), British soldier
- Henry Simpson Bridgeman (1757–1782), British politician
