= Tracy Garner =

Tracy Garner may refer to:

- Tracy Garner, accessory in Murder of Anthony Walker
- Tracy Garner, character in The Hangover
