= Elizabeth Sander =

English nun and writer (died 1607)

- Born: before 1574; England
- Died: 1 August 1607; Lisbon, Portugal
- Occupation: Bridgettine nun
- Known for: escaping Winchester Castle
- Relatives: Nicholas Sanders (brother)

Elizabeth Sander (before 1574 – 1 August 1607) was an English Bridgettine nun and writer. She joined the Syon Abbey nuns, who were in religious exile, and then returned to England where she was imprisoned and escaped in 1580. She then escaped from imprisonment in Winchester Castle before she surrendered to her jailors. She died in Lisbon in the only English community of nuns to survive unbroken after the dissolution of the monasteries.

== Life ==
Elizabeth Sander's parents were Elizabeth (maiden name Mynes) and William Sander (died 1572) and they lived at Charlwood in Surrey. One of her eleven siblings was the priest Nicholas Sanders. Her brother, who had been a professor, was ordained in Rome as a Roman Catholic priest as he had left England after the Protestant Elizabeth I of England came to the throne in 1558. Her sister Margaret became a Bridgettine nun and that too was her ambition.

How the Syon nuns moved in the 16th century
She returned from Mechelen to the UK, but died in Lisbon

She left England in the company of others of similar ambitions to become a nun before 1578. The group she joined was formed when Syon Abbey was closed in 1539 as part of the Dissolution of the Monasteries. Under the leadership of the Abbess Katherine Palmer, this group of nuns had moved five times between 1539 and 1573 when it settled in Mechelen. Strangely, we know that Elizabeth was part of the Mechelen group in 1578, because in that year she came back to England.

She arrived back in England in 1578 with others including Mary Champney and Anne Stapleton. Champeney died that year and Stapleton died in 1580. It is supposed that they may have returned to England to escape the problems at Mechelen where their cloisters now included Calvinists, or maybe it was to raise money for the Mechelen group. We know a lot about this group as Sander wrote long letters to Sir Francis Englefield. Englefield had held high office for Queen Mary but in 1559 he had gone into exile from a Protestant England.

Sander was able to stay with other Catholics in England, but in 1580 she was imprisoned and questioned about the books that she was carrying. The Bishop of Winchester wrote of her "certeyne lewde and forbydden bokes". These books probably included a work by Edward Campion. She was questioned to find out about her plans, but she said that she was in England to avoid the heretics at Mechelen. Her interrogators were very interested in her brother who was known for his sedition. She left her confinement to attend mass and when caught she was imprisoned in Winchester Castle. She escaped from Winchester Castle when she ignored the advice of her fellow prisoners who advised her to be law abiding. After she escaped she talked to other priests and under their advice she returned to her former jail. This surprising move resulted in her being given greater freedoms.

In 1587 she returned to her fellow nuns abroad (now in Rouen) and after some years the community settled in Lisbon in 1594.

== Death and legacy ==
Elizabeth Sander died in Lisbon on 1 August 1607. The Syon Abbey nuns would in time return to England – the only community to survive dissolution without a break. The community closed in 2011.
