= William Brereton (priest) =

Anglican priest

William Brereton (circa 1726 – 5 January 1812) was an Anglican priest. He was educated at Eton College and Christ's College, Cambridge, and was rector of both Cottesmore, Rutland, and Pickwell, Leicestershire. He was Archdeacon of Stafford from 1782 to 1801.

Church of England titles
Preceded by John Carver	Archdeacon of Stafford; 1782–1801	Succeeded by Robert Nares
