= Yasmin Finney =

English actress (born 2003)

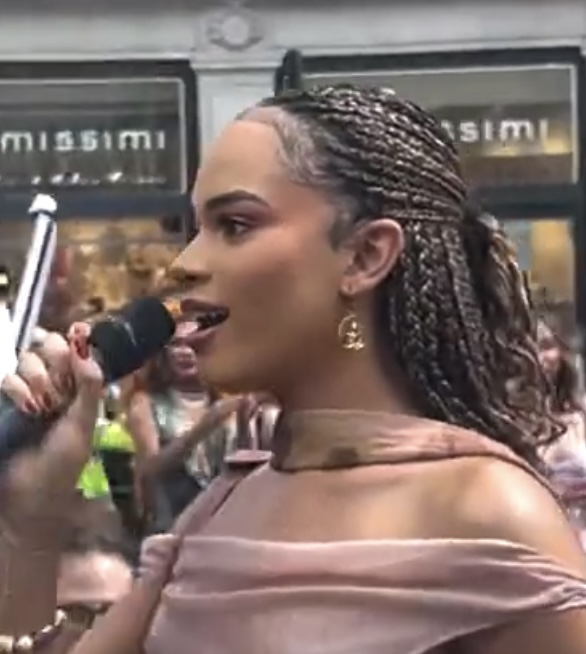
- Finney speaking at the 2024 London Trans+ Pride
- Born: 30 August 2003 (age 22)
- Education: Ashton-on-Mersey School
- Occupation: Actress
- Years active: 2021–present

TikTok information
- Page: yazdemand
- Followers: 1.9M
- Last updated: 29 April 2024

Yasmin Finney (born 30 August 2003) is an English actress and internet personality. She is known for her role as Elle Argent in the Netflix series Heartstopper (2022–present), for which she received a Children's and Family Emmy Award nomination. She also had a recurring role as Rose Noble in the BBC series Doctor Who (2023–2025). Her films include LifeHack (2025).

== Early life ==
Finney was born on 30 August 2003 to a Jamaican mother and an English father of Irish and Italian descent. She and her half-sister were raised on a council estate in Trafford, Manchester by her single mother.

Finney attended Ashton-on-Mersey School, which was part of The Dean Trust. She participated in a number of local theatre productions growing up, including in the University of Manchester's Sackville Theatre, the Royal Exchange Theatre, and the Aylesbury Waterside Theatre. She studied performing arts at The Manchester College.

== Career ==
Starting in 2019, Finney initially gained a following through her TikTok videos documenting her experiences as a Black British teenage trans woman.

At the age of 17 in April 2021, Finney was cast as Kelsa in the Billy Porter film Anything's Possible and Elle Argent in the Netflix series Heartstopper, the latter of which premiered in 2022. She had to pull out of Anything's Possible due to COVID-19 travel restrictions impacting her ability to get a United States work visa, leading her to be replaced by Eva Reign. She appeared on GLAAD's second annual 20 Under 20 list.

In August 2022, it was announced that Finney would star in the upcoming short film Mars as the character Charlie Acaster. The film premiered in October of the same year at the London Film Festival. On 30 August 2023, it was also announced that she would appear as a guest judge during the fifth series of RuPaul's Drag Race UK set to begin broadcasting in autumn 2023. In November 2023, she starred as Rose Noble, the trans daughter of former companion Donna Noble (Catherine Tate), in the 60th anniversary specials of the BBC series Doctor Who.

== Filmography ==
Key
†	Denotes works that have not yet been released

=== Film ===
Year	Title	Role	Notes
2022	Mars	Charlie Acaster	Short film
2025	Hello Stranger	Sasha	Interactive film
2025	LifeHack	Alex	
2026	Heartstopper Forever	Elle Argent	

=== Television ===
Year	Title	Role	Notes	Ref.
2022–2024	Heartstopper	Elle Argent	Main role; 24 episodes	
2023	RuPaul's Drag Race UK	Herself	Guest judge; Episode: "Purr-fect Looks"	
2023–2025	Doctor Who	Rose Noble	Recurring role; 5 episodes	

=== Theatre ===
Production	Role	Venue	Ref.
Page to Stage	Rose	Royal Exchange, Manchester	
Tie	Paris	Sackville Theatre, University of Manchester	
Antigone	Ismone	Waterside, Sale	
Port	Christine	Sackville Theatre, University of Manchester	
DNA	Leah	Sackville Theatre, University of Manchester	

== Accolades ==
Award	Year	Category	Nominated work	Result	Ref.
Children's and Family Emmy Awards	2022	Outstanding Supporting Performance	Heartstopper	Nominated	
Gay Times Honours	2022	On Screen Trailblazer	Heartstopper	Won	
Soho House Awards	2022	Breakthrough Actress	Heartstopper	Won	
Rose d'Or Awards	2022	Emerging Talent	Heartstopper	Won	
Queerty Awards	2023	Badass	Herself	Nominated	
