= Melville Scott =

The Ven. Melville Horne Scott (1827–1898) was Archdeacon of Stafford from 1888 until his death.

== Biography ==
Scott came from an eminent family: his grandfather was the influential preacher and author Thomas Scott; and his brother George Gilbert Scott an English Gothic Revival architect Two of his nephews George Gilbert Scott, Jr. and John Oldrid Scott, and his grandson Giles Gilbert Scott, were also prominent architects. Another nephew was the botanist Dukinfield Henry Scott. His own father was Reverend The Rev. Thomas Scott, Rector of Wappenham, he

Scott was educated at Gonville and Caius College, Cambridge and ordained in 1851. He held incumbencies at Ockbrook (1852 to 1872), Litchurch (1872 to 1878; and Lichfield (1878 to 1894). He was appointed a prebendary of Lichfield Cathedral in 1878 and a Canon Residentiary in 1894.

He died on 3 June 1898.
