= Archdeacon of Lichfield =

Church of England ecclesiastical office

The Archdeacon of Lichfield (called Archdeacon of Stafford until 1980) is a senior cleric in the Diocese of Lichfield who is responsible for pastoral care and discipline of clergy in the Lichfield archdeaconry.

The archdeaconry was erected – as the Archdeaconry of Stafford – in the ancient Diocese of Coventry (later called Coventry and Lichfield, Lichfield and Coventry & Lichfield) before 1135, around the time when archdeacons were first being appointed across England. On 24 July 1877, the archdeaconry of Stoke-upon-Trent was created from the northern part of the Stafford archdeaconry. After the deanery of Stafford was transferred on 26 September 1979 to the Stoke archdeaconry, Stafford archdeaconry was renamed the archdeaconry of Lichfield on 25 April 1980. The present archdeacon is Dr Sue Weller.

== List of archdeacons ==
=== High Medieval ===
At its creation, the archdeaconry was in the Diocese of Coventry. Multiple archdeacons are named from 1086, but their territorial titles are unknown.

- 1135–1145: Robert
- bef. c. 1146–aft. c. 1146: William
- bef. c. 1149–aft. c. 1159: Helias
- bef. 1175–aft. 1175: Ralph de Thamewood or de Tamworth
- 1175–1182: Alan
- bef. 1191–aft. 1191: Henry Marshal (disputed)
- bef. 1191–aft. 1191: Alexander
- bef. 1194–1213 (res.): Henry de Loundres
- bef. c. 1213–aft. c. 1213: Helyas
- 5 March 1213 – 1222 (d.): Robert of Gloucester (also Archdeacon of Sudbury from bef. 1220)

From 1228, the diocese became the Diocese of Coventry and Lichfield.

- bef. 1238–aft. 1224: William of York
- bef. 1234–aft. 1234: R. de Langdon
- bef. 1244–aft. 1244: Robert of Stafford
- bef. 1259–aft. 1259: Richard de Mepham
- bef. 1265–1275 (res.): Thomas de Cantilupe
- bef. c. 1290–aft. c. 1290: Adam Paine
- ?–bef. 1301 (d.): Rayner de Vichio/Florence

=== Late Medieval ===
- 6 June 1301 – 19 January 1322 (res.): John de Brunforte, son of Octavian
- 8 December 1321 – 20 August 1323 (exch.): Robert de Patrika
- 20 August 1323–June 1336 (d.): John Clarel
- ?–bef. 1349 (d.): William de Apeltre
- 26 June 1349–bef. 1349 (d.): Roger de Depyng
- 27 August 1349 – 4 June 1353 (exch.): Richard de Birmingham
- 1349–bef. 1355 (d.): Roger de Dorkyng (unsuccessful claimant)
- 4 June 1353 – 14 May 1356 (exch.): John de Marisco
- 14 May 1356–bef. 1358 (d.): William de Grenburgh
- 16 October 1358–bef. 1374 (d.): John de Sulgrave
- 29 March 1374 – 1381 (res.): John de Outheby
- 28 December 1381–bef. 1400 (res.): Richard de Toppeclyve
- 1 September 1400–aft. 1413: Henry Davyd
- bef. 1415–aft. 1415: John Fyton
- bef. 1418–1418 (res.): Thomas Barton
- 13 July 1418–bef. 1422 (res.): John Fyton (again)
- 1 March 1422–bef. 1432 (d.): William de Admondeston
- 4 July 1432–bef. 1442 (d.): Ralph Prestbury
- bef. 1442–bef. June 1442 (res.): Roger Wall
- 29 June 1442 – 1459 (res.): John Wendesley, illegitimate son of Sir Thomas Wensley (d.1403) (or Wendesley) of Wensley in Derbyshire, five times a Member of Parliament for Derbyshire.
- 27 May 1459–bef. 1467 (res.): Thomas Hawkins (became Archdeacon of Worcester)
- 6 December 1467–March 1497 (d.): William Moggys
- 30 March 1497–aft. 1497: William Duffield
- bef. 1501–30 June 1501 (res.): Edward Willoughby
- 30 June 1501–July 1515 (d.): John Wardroper
- 20 July 1515–bef. 1529: Adam Grafton (died 23 June 1529)
- bef. 1530–1530 (res.): Geoffrey Blythe (nephew of Bishop Blythe)
- 3 October 1530–aft. 1530: John Blythe (another Blythe nephew)
- bef. 1536–1540 (res.): Nicholas Heath

From 1539, the diocese became the Diocese of Lichfield and Coventry.

- 13 November 1540–bef. 1547 (exch.): John Redman (Master of Trinity from 1546)

=== Early modern ===
- bef. 1547–?: John Dakyn (unsuccessful exchange)
- 5 August 1547–September 1567 (d.): Richard Walker
- 12 May 1567 – 1586 (res.): Thomas Bickley
- 2 February 1586 – 12 October 1614 (d.): Humphrey Tyndall
- 1613–bef. 1636 (d.): John Fulnetby
- 27 December 1636–bef. 1660 (d.): Martin Tinley
- 6 December 1660 – 4 May 1682 (d.): Francis Coke
- 14 July 1682 – 4 May 1721 (d.): Nathaniel Ellison
- 3 May 1721–bef. 1732 (d.): Thomas Allen (also Dean of Chester from 1722)
- 30 June 1732–bef. 1763 (d.): James Brooks
- 3 February 1763 – 1769 (res.): Edmund Law
- 15 March 1769 – 8 May 1782 (res.): John Carver (afterwards Archdeacon of Surrey)
- 23 May 1782 – 24 April 1801 (res.): William Brereton
- 28 April 1801 – 23 March 1829 (d.): Robert Nares
- 9 May 1829 – 13 August 1855 (d.): George Hodson

On 24 January 1837, the diocese lost the Coventry archdeaconry to the Diocese of Worcester and became the Diocese of Lichfield.

- December 1855–18 July 1876 (d.): Henry Moore

=== Late modern ===
- 1876–bef. 1888: John Iles (died 1888)

Stoke archdeaconry was split off on 24 July 1877.

- 1888–3 June 1898 (d.): Melville Scott
- 1898–1910 (ret.): Robert Hodgson
- 1911–7 June 1922 (d.): Charles Blakeway
- 1922–1933 (ret.): Hugh Bright
- 1935–1944 (res.): Robert Hodson
- 1945–1959 (res.): William Parker
- 1959–1974 (ret.): Basil Stratton (afterwards archdeacon emeritus)
- 1974–1980: Richard Ninis (became Archdeacon of Lichfield)

The archdeaconry was renamed Lichfield on 25 April 1980.

- 1980–1998 (ret.): Richard Ninis (previously Archdeacon of Stafford)
- 1998–2000 (ret.): George Frost
- 3 March 2001 – 5 May 2013 (ret.): Chris Liley
- 18 July 2013 – 31 May 2019 (res.): Simon Baker
- September 2019 – present: Sue Weller

== Sources ==
- Le Neve, John; Hardy, Sir Thomas Duffus (1854). Archdeacons of Lichfield . Fasti ecclesiae Anglicanae. Vol. 1. Oxford: Oxford University Press. pp. 570–573 – via Wikisource.
- Jones, B. (1964), Fasti Ecclesiae Anglicanae 1300–1541, vol. 10, pp. 18–20
- Horn, Joyce M. (2003), Fasti Ecclesiae Anglicanae 1541–1857, vol. 10, pp. 14–16
