= Henry Bridgeman (bishop) =

English Anglican bishop of Sodor and Man (1615–1682)

The Right Reverend Henry Bridgeman
- Bishop of Sodor and Man
- Diocese: Diocese of Sodor and Man
- In office: 1671–1682 (death)
- Predecessor: Isaac Barrow
- Successor: John Lake

Orders
- Consecration: 1 October 1671 by John Wilkins

Personal details
- Born: 22 October 1615
- Died: 15 May 1682 (aged 66)
- Denomination: Anglican
- Education: Brasenose College, Oxford

Henry Bridgeman (22 October 1615 – 15 May 1682) was an Anglican clergyman who was the Bishop of Sodor and Man from 1671 to 1682.

The third son of John Bridgeman, Bishop of Chester, and Elizabeth Helyar, he was educated at Brasenose College, Oxford, graduating with Master of Arts degrees in 1639 and 1641. He was ordained in the Anglican ministry as a deacon on 9 June 1639 and a priest on 22 December 1639. He held a number of ecclesiastical appointments before and after becoming a bishop. The first appointments were as Rector of Oddington, Oxfordshire (1639–1640), Rector of St Bartholomew's Church, Barrow (1639–1682), and Rector of Bangor Monachorum with Overton (1641–1682). He was appointed Archdeacon of Richmond on 20 May 1648 and resigned the post on 10 June 1664. He was installed (by proxy) a canon of York on 22 September 1660, holding the prebendary of Stillington. He received a Bachelorate of Divinity (BD) in 1661 and Doctorate of Divinity (DD) in 1664. His next appointments were as Vicar of St Peter's Church, Plemstall on 26 March 1661, Dean of Chester on 16 July 1661, and Rural Dean of Manchester on 27 August 1664.

He was nominated Bishop of Sodor and Man by Charles Stanley, 8th Earl of Derby, and consecrated on 1 October 1671.

He died in office on 15 May 1682.

Church of England titles
| Preceded by Thomas Dodd | Archdeacon of Richmond; 1648–1664 | Succeeded by Charles Bridgeman |
| Preceded by William Nichols | Dean of Chester; 1660–1682 | Succeeded by James Arderne |
| Preceded by Isaac Barrow | Bishop of Sodor and Man; 1671–1682 | Succeeded by John Lake |
