= Martin Tinley =

Martin Tinley (b Glemsford 24 July 1605 - d London 31 January 1647) was an Anglican priest in the 17th century.

Tinley was educated at Westminster School and Christ Church, Oxford. He became the incumbent at Lisnagarvey in 1637; Treasurer of Dromore in 1638; Archdeacon of Stafford in 1640; Rector of St Paul's Walden in 1642; and Archdeacon of Cork in 1662.
