= Basil Stratton =

Archdeacon of Lichfield

The Ven. Basil Stratton (7 April 1906 - 9 May 2000) was Archdeacon of Lichfield and Canon Treasurer of Lichfield Cathedral from 1959 to 1974.

Stratton was educated at Lincoln School and Durham University. He was an active member of the Durham University Boat Club, serving as stroke for the university in both the Coxless Four and the Eight. He also attempted to row across the River Wear in a bathtub, which sank and never recovered.

Stratton was ordained deacon in 1930; and priest in 1931. After a curacy at St Stephen, Grimsby he was an SPG Missionary in India from 1932 to 1934; and with the Indian Ecclesiastical Establishment from 1935 to 1941. He was a Chaplain to the British Armed Forces from 1941 to 1947, serving in Iraq, India, Burma and Malaya, and was also Mentioned in dispatches. In 1948 he became Vicar of Figheldean; and in 1953 of Market Drayton. He was also an Honorary Chaplain to the Queen from 1965 to 1976.
