= Thomas Clerk (priest) =

English priest (??–c.1541)

Thomas Clerk was an English priest and the first recorded Dean of Chester, serving less than six months in 1541 He reportedly died the same year.
