= Ashton-on-Mersey School =

Secondary school in England

Location
- Cecil Avenue; Ashton On Mersey, Sale, Greater Manchester, M33 5BP; England; 53°25′09″N 2°20′24″W

Information
- Type: Academy
- Motto: "Believe Achieve Succeed"
- School board: West Trafford School Partnership
- Local authority: Trafford
- Trust: The Dean Trust
- Department for Education URN: 138123 Tables
- Ofsted: Reports
- Headteacher: Lee McConaghie
- Gender: Coeducational
- Age: 11 to 18
- Enrolment: 1,600
- Hours in school day: 6 hours 35 minutes
- Colour: Burgundy
- Website: http://www.aomschool.co.uk/

Ashton-on-Mersey School is a secondary school and sixth form with academy status in Ashton upon Mersey, Greater Manchester, England. The school was formed in 1981 through the amalgamation of separate boys’ and girls’ schools, and it later became the founding school of The Dean Trust, a growing multi‑academy trust that now includes several primary and secondary schools across the region. The school is known for its sports.

The school is an academy, part of The Dean Trust, which includes Broadoak School and Lord Derby Academy in Huyton. Ashton-on-Mersey School can serve up to 1,570 students aged 11 to 19, it used to have a lower amount (1421 as of the 2023-2024 Academic year), but now has more (1600 as of the 2025-2026 Academic year).

The school is larger than average and has received strong Ofsted evaluations, including four “Outstanding” ratings. In its January 2019 inspection, it was rated “Good” overall. Policies include a strict uniform code and bans on offensive or abusive language and general phone usage.

== Academics ==
Ashton‑on‑Mersey’s curriculum is designed around broad cultural capital and global citizenship, not just exam performance, and emphasises both academic and personal development.

Of the 2022/23 cohort, 52% got a grade 5 or above in their English and Maths GCSE exams. The most chosen subject of this cohort that is not one of the five compulsory subjects (Maths, English Language, English Literature, Science, and Spanish) was History, with 58.43% of the students choosing to study it.

In 2023/24, 81.5 % of pupils achieved a grade 4 or above in English and Maths GCSEs — higher than both the local authority average (79.0 %) and the England state‑funded school average (64.5 %).

== Gymnasium ==
The school's gymnasium is open to the public after school on weekends and holidays. This is part of Dean Trust Fitness and Leisure, which have sites at other schools in The Dean Trust. A variety of parties are also offered outside of school hours, in partnership with Prime Dance.

The gym offers facilities including a fully equipped fitness suite, outdoor tennis courts, and a floodlit 3G astro-turf pitch designed for year-round use. The spaces support many activities from casual workouts and grassroots sports clubs to organised training sessions and competitive matches.

== Notable alumni ==
- Darren Campbell (born 1973), English sprinter
- Patrick Brown (born 1999),English boxer
- Dakota Ditcheva (born 1998), English Muay Thai practitioner
- Jimmy Dunne (born 1997), Irish Footballer
- Anthony Elanga (born 2002), Swedish footballer
- Jonny Evans (born 1988), Northern Irish footballer
- Yasmin Finney (born 2003), English actress
- Ryan Giggs (born 1973), English and Welsh footballer
- Angel Gomes (born 2000), English footballer
- Josh Harrop (born 1995), English footballer
- Sam Johnstone (born 1993), English footballer
- Shea Lacey (born 2007), English footballer
- Jesse Lingard (born 1992), English footballer
- Donald Love (born 1994), English footballer
- Kobbie Mainoo (born 2005), English footballer
- Scott McTominay (born 1996), Scottish footballer
- Ravel Morrison (born 1993), English footballer
- Ben Pearson (born 1995), English footballer
- Karl Pilkington (born 1972), English comedian and television personality
- Gerard Piqué (born 1987), Spanish footballer
- Paul Pogba (born 1993), French footballer
- Marcus Rashford (born 1997), English footballer
- Joe Rothwell (born 1995), English footballer
- Shola Shoretire (born 2004), English footballer
- Axel Tuanzebe (born 1997), Congolese footballer
- Carly Tait (born 1986), English Paralympian
