= John Hart (Jesuit) =

English Jesuit (died 1586)

John Hart (died 1586) was an English Jesuit, known for his equivocal behaviour on the English mission in the early 1580s.

== Early life ==
John Hart was one of five children of William Hart of Eynsham, a recusant. In February 1569 John Hart enrolled at the University of Leuven and the following year went to the English College, Douai. Around 1574, he left Douai for the English College, Rome. His younger brother William also attended the English College in Rome, where he died in 1584. His two sisters, Elizabeth and Margaret, became Bridgettine nuns at the Convent of Sion in Rouen.

John Hart received Catholic minor orders in 1575 and in 1578 was awarded the degree of B.D. in the university of Douay. On 29 March 1578 he was ordained priest in Cambrai. Shortly thereafter, the College at Douai relocated to Rheims, as did Hart. In June 1580 Hart was sent on the English mission to replace Thomas Goldwell, and Nicholas Morton, both elderly and well-known in England. Hart, Thomas Cottam, and Humphrey Ely set sail from Dunkirk. Unbeknownst to them, the spy Charles Sledd, who had dined with William Allen, had already advised Henry Cobham, English ambassador at Paris, that Allen would soon be sending priests back to England.

=== Arrest and reprieves ===
Mistaken for someone else, Hart was arrested as soon as he landed at Dover. Having identified himself, he was sent in custody to Nonsuch Palace and examined by Francis Walsingham. He was paroled on bond for three months, conditional upon his going to Oxford to confer with Protestant theologian John Rainolds. He was subsequently placed in the Marshalsea Prison, and taken to the Tower of London on 24 December 1580. There, after being shown the rack, a frightened Hart was interrogated and gave information concerning a number of Catholics on the Continent, and Allen's theories of how best the Queen might be deposed.

On 21 November 1581, the day after Edmund Campion's condemnation, Hart was tried with other priests and condemned to death. On 1 December 1581 he was to have been executed with Campion, Ralph Sherwin, and Alexander Briant, but when placed on the hurdle he promised to recant, and he was taken back to prison.

Hart then wrote to Walsingham what was an act of apostasy, a document that has survived. He later retracted it. What Hart agreed with Walsingham at this point is that he would inform on William Allen, using a claim to having been racked to add to his credibility. Hart then retracted the offer, was condemned to die on 28 May 1582, and then was reprieved again. It is stated that on 18 March 1582, while in prison, Hart was definitively admitted into the Society of Jesus.

=== Conference with Rainolds ===
Walsingham gave Hart leave to go to Oxford for three months on condition that he should confer with John Rainolds on the matters in controversy between the English and Roman churches. The conference appears to have taken place during 1582. William Camden was later complimentary about Hart's learning.

The Summe of the Conference betwene John Rainoldes and John Hart, touching the Head and Faith of the Church. Penned by John Rainoldes, according to the notes set down in writing by them both; perused by J. Hart was published at London in 1584, reprinted in 1588, 1598, and 1609, and translated into Latin (Oxford, 1610) by Henry Parry. Charles Dodd argued that the conference was held on unequal terms, as Hart was unprovided with books, and asserted that the details were unfairly represented by Rainolds.

=== Further confinement ===
Hart returned to Walsingham, and was sent back to the Tower of London. He remained confined for a long period, and was subjected to punishments. The view of Rainolds was that Hart was motivated only by the thought of reprieve.

== Later life ==
On 21 January 1585 Hart and twenty others, including Jasper Heywood, were sent to France, banished from England by royal commission. They were landed on the coast of Normandy, and were sent to Abbeville after signing a certificate to the effect that they had been well treated on the voyage. Hart then went to Verdun, and on to Rome. His superiors ordered him to Poland, and he died at Jarosław, on 17 or 19 July 1586.

== Journal ==
Hart's journal from the Tower has been attributed incorrectly to Edward Rishton. It formed part of the material for the second edition (1586) of the De origine ac progressu schismatis Anglicani' of Nicholas Sander. From the third edition it was not used, and the suggestion is that Robert Persons by then knew that Hart had offered to become an agent of Walsingham.

== Notes ==
Attribution

This article incorporates text from a publication now in the public domain: Stephen, Leslie; Lee, Sidney, eds. (1891). "Hart, John (d.1586)". Dictionary of National Biography. Vol. 25. London: Smith, Elder & Co.
