= John Thornborough =

English bishop (1551–1641)

The Right Reverend John Thornborough
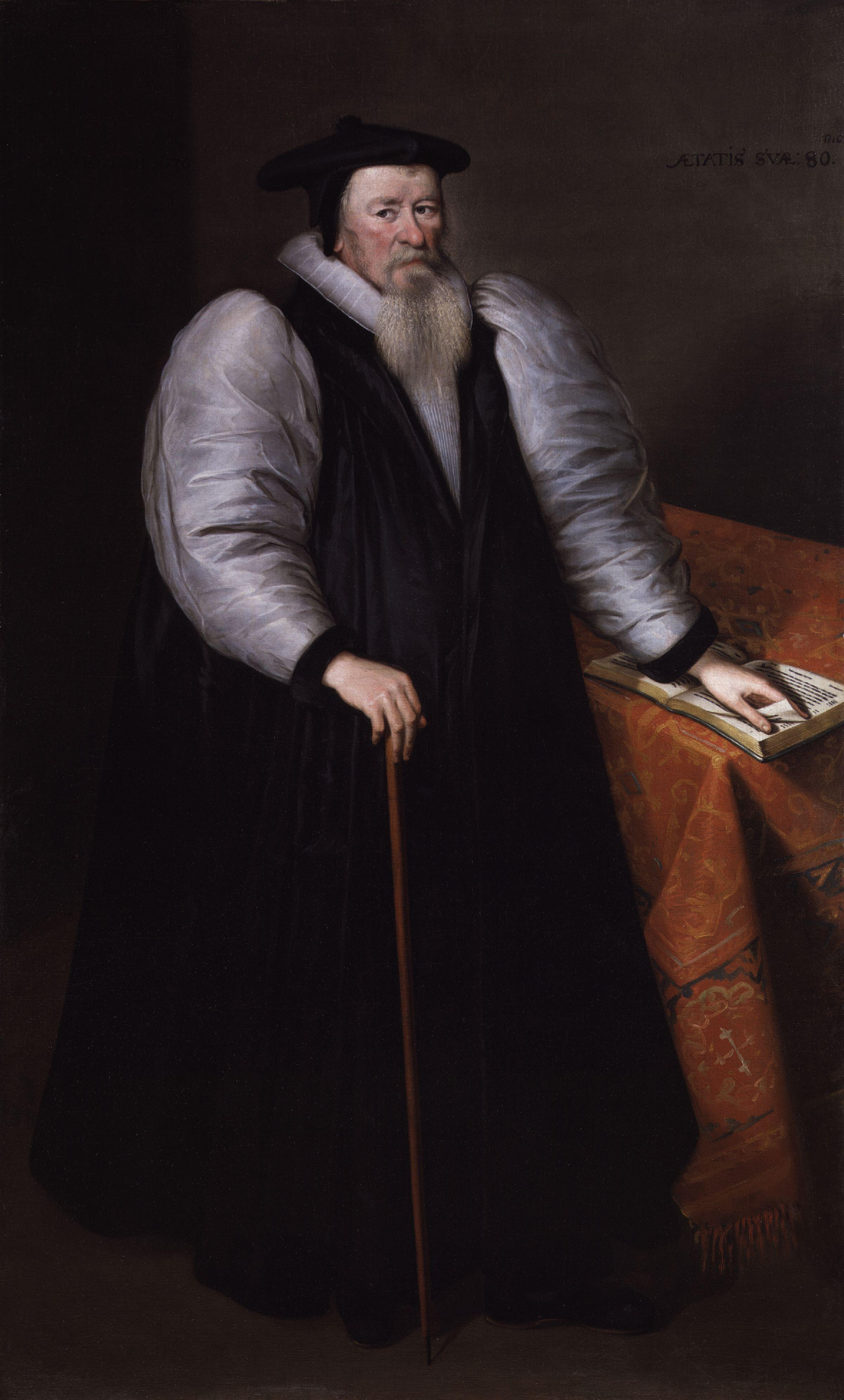

Personal details
- Born: 1551 Salisbury, England
- Died: 1641 (aged 89–90)

John Thornborough (1551–1641) was an English bishop.

== Life ==
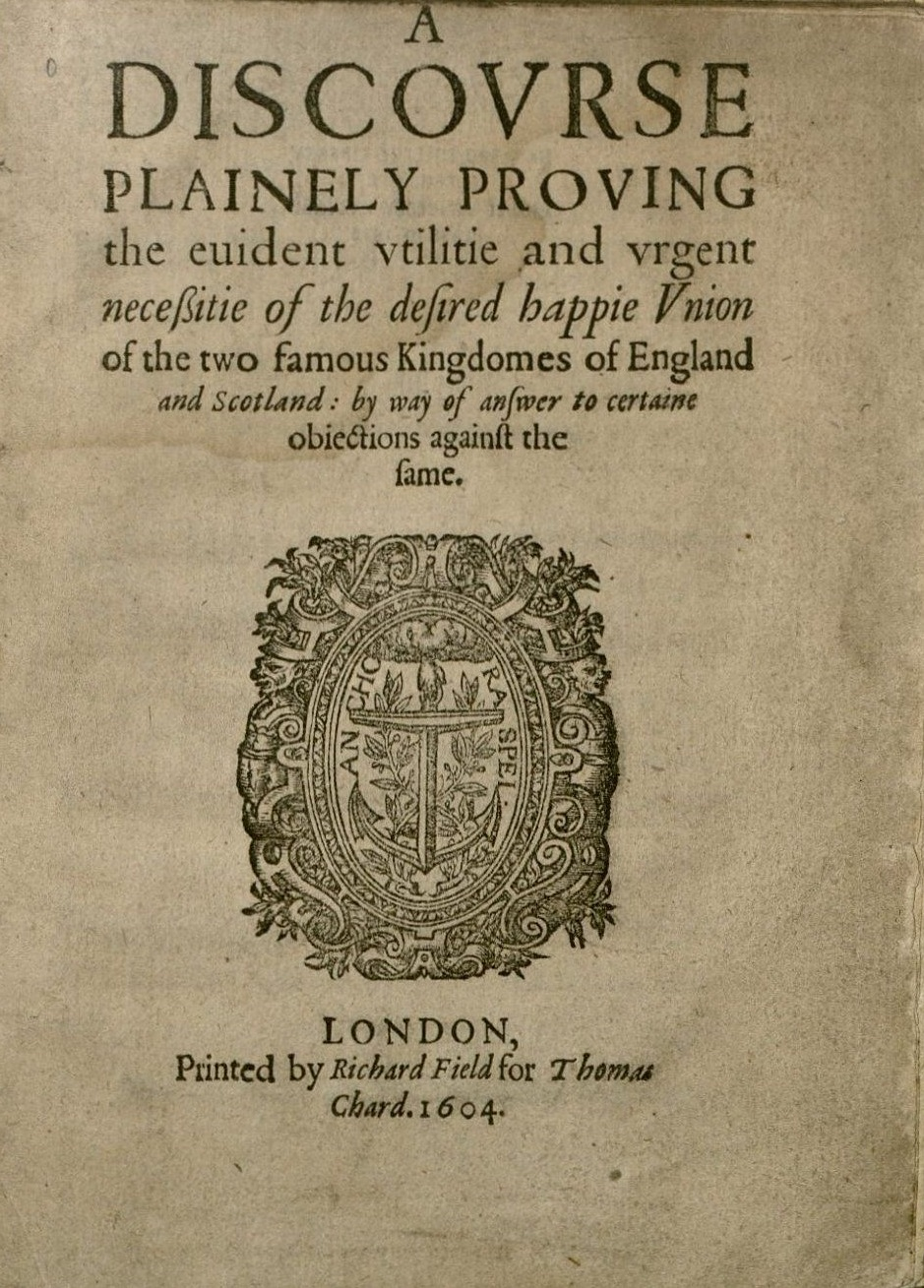
A discourse plainely proving the euident vtilitie and vrgent necessitie of the desired happie vnion of the two famous kingdomes of England and Scotland, 1604

Thornborough was born in Salisbury, and graduated from Magdalen College, Oxford.

In a long ecclesiastical career, he was employed as a chaplain by the Earl of Pembroke, and Queen Elizabeth. He was Dean of York, Bishop of Limerick in 1593, Bishop of Bristol in 1603, and Bishop of Worcester from 1617. He was appointed Clerk of the Closet in 1588, serving Queen Elizabeth I in that capacity until the end of her reign in 1603.

He was tolerant of Puritans, encouraging his congregation to attend puritan lectures. He also shielded the future biographer Samuel Clarke (1599–1683).

He wrote an alchemical book, Lithotheorikos of 1621. He is known to have employed Simon Forman. Robert Fludd dedicated Anatomiae Amphitheatrum (1623) to Thornborough.

Church of England titles
Preceded by Matthew Hutton	Dean of York; 1589–1617	Succeeded by George Meriton
Preceded by William Casey	Bishop of Limerick; 1593–1603	Succeeded by Bernard Adams
Vacant since 1593 Title last held by Richard Fletcher	Bishop of Bristol; 1603–1617	Succeeded by Nicholas Felton
Preceded by Henry Parry	Bishop of Worcester; 1617–1641	Succeeded by John Prideaux
