= Giles Thomson =

English academic and bishop

Giles Thomson (Tomson, Thompson) (1553–1612) was an English academic and bishop.

== Life ==
He was born in London, and educated at Merchant Taylors' School, and to University College, Oxford where he matriculated in 1571. He became a Fellow of All Souls College in 1580, and Divinity Reader at Magdalen College. Queen Elizabeth made him one of her chaplains.

He became Dean of Windsor in 1602, and took part in the Hampton Court Conference of 1604. He was a translator for the King James Bible, a member of the Second Oxford Company.

He became Bishop of Gloucester in 1611, but died before visiting the see. There is a monument to him in the Chapel of St George, Windsor.

Church of England titles
Preceded by Henry Parry	Bishop of Gloucester; 1611–1612	Succeeded by Miles Smith
