= Dean Trust Rose Bridge =

Location
- Holt Street; Ince-in-Makerfield; Wigan, Greater Manchester, WN1 3HD; England
- Coordinates: 53.54655°N 2.61063°W

Information
- Type: Academy
- Motto: Believe, Achieve, Succeed
- Local authority: Wigan Council
- Trust: The Dean Trust
- Department for Education URN: 146797 Tables
- Ofsted: Reports
- Executive Headteacher: L Cropper
- Gender: Mixed
- Age: 11 to 16
- Website: https://www.deantrustrosebridge.co.uk/

Dean Trust Rose Bridge (formerly Rose Bridge Academy) is a mixed secondary school located in the Ince-in-Makerfield area of Wigan in the English county of Greater Manchester.

Formerly a community school administered by Wigan Metropolitan Borough Council, in April 2015 Rose Bridge High School was converted to academy status and was renamed Rose Bridge Academy. The school was managed by Community First Academy Trust, but continued to coordinate with Wigan Metropolitan Borough Council for admissions.

Following failings in raising attainment in the school following the takeover by Community First Academy Trust (CFAT) the trust agreed to work with The Dean Trust — a local trust with a reputation of improving standards in similarly failing schools. The Dean Trust later took over as sole trust of the school in September 2018. As of February 2019, the school was renamed as Dean Trust Rose Bridge — labelled as a 'rapidly improving' school in a November 2018 report, after being placed into 'Special Measures' in a January 2018 report.

Dean Trust Rose Bridge offers GCSEs, BTECs and the DiDA as programmes of study for pupils. The school also has a specialism in science.
