= William Cliffe =

English churchman and lawyer

William Cliffe, Clyffe or Clyff (died 1558) was an English churchman and lawyer, dean of Chester from 1547.

== Life ==
Cliffe was educated at the University of Cambridge, where he graduated LL.B. in 1514. He was admitted advocate at Doctors' Commons on 16 December 1522, and graduated LL.D. in 1523.

== Clerical career ==
Cliffe was commissary of the diocese of London between 1522 and 1529, instituted to the prebend of Twyford in St Paul's Cathedral in 1526. He was appointed archdeacon of London three years later, prebendary of Fenton in York Minster in 1532. He resigned the archdeaconry of London to become archdeacon of Cleveland in 1533, becoming precentor of York in 1534, and treasurer of York in 1538.

On the suppression of the treasurer post in 1547, Cliffe was made dean of Chester. He kept this position for the rest of his life. Two living he held were Waverton, Cheshire, from 1533, and Standish, Lancashire, from 1552.

== Other ==
Convocation sought Cliffe's advice, as a civil lawyer, on the royal divorce, in 1533. On his preferment to the deanery of Chester he was immediately thrown into the Fleet prison at the instance of Sir Richard Cotton, comptroller of the king's household. He obtained his liberty by leasing the chapter lands to Cotton at an undervalue.

== Works ==
Cliffe was one of the authors of the treatise The Godly and Pious Institution of a Christian Man, commonly known as the Bishops' Book, published in 1537.

== Notes ==
Attribution

This article incorporates text from a publication now in the public domain: Stephen, Leslie, ed. (1887). "Clyffe, William". Dictionary of National Biography. Vol. 11. London: Smith, Elder & Co.
