= Thomas Modesley =

English priest

Thomas Modesley was a sixteenth-century English priest.

Modesley was presented dean of Chester by Queen Elizabeth on 12 August 1580 and served until his death in 1589.
