= Simon Baker (priest) =

British retired Anglican priest

Simon Nicholas Hartland Baker (born 1957) is a British retired Anglican priest who served as Archdeacon of Lichfield from 2013 until his retirement on 31 May 2019.

Baker was educated at King's College London and Queen's College, Birmingham. He was ordained deacon in 1981, and priest in 1982. After a curacy in Tupsley he was Vicar of Shinfield from 1985 to 1988. He was Director of Discipleship and Ministry, and Warden of Readers for the Diocese of Winchester from 2002 to 2013. In that year he became Rector of the United Benefice of St Michael and St Mary with St John at Wall, Lichfield.
