= Thomas Allen (dean of Chester) =

English priest

Thomas Brooke was an English Anglican priest, most notably Dean of Chester from 1721 until his death in 1732.

Allen was born in Staffordshire and educated at Emmanuel College, Cambridge. He was also concurrently the Archdeacon of Staffordshire.
