= Francis Coke =

Francis Coke was an Anglican clergyman.

Coke was born in Trusley and educated at St John's College, Cambridge. He was Archdeacon of Stafford from 6 December 1660 until his death on 4 May 1682.
