= Richard Worsfold =

Archdeacon of Leicester

Richard Vernon Worsfold (born 17 July 1964) is a British Anglican priest. From 2018 until 2025, he served as Archdeacon of Leicester in the Church of England's Diocese of Leicester.

Worsfold was educated at the University of Exeter and Cranmer Hall, Durham. He was ordained in the Church of England as a deacon in 1995 and as a priest in 1996. He served his title at Countesthorpe between 1995 and 1999. He then served incumbencies at Bradgate Team Parish and Westcotes. He was the Area Dean of Leicester from 2014 to 2018 before his appointment as Archdeacon. Worsford resigned his archdeaconry to become Area Dean of Salford and Leigh from 23 September 2025.

Church of England titles
Preceded by Tim Stratford	Archdeacon of Leicester; 2018–2025	Richard Trethewey
