= Henry Moore (priest) =

Archdeacon of Stafford from 1856 to '76

The Ven. Henry Moore (1795 - 1876) was Archdeacon of Stafford from 1856 to 1876.

Moore was born at Sherborne, educated at Trinity College, Cambridge and ordained in 1819.After a curacy in Tachbrook he held incumbencies at Eccleshall, Dunchurch, Penn and Lichfield. He died on 18 July 1876; and his funeral was held at Lichfield Cathedral on 24 July 1876.
