= Richard Walker (priest) =

English priest

Richard Walker (1501–1567) was an English priest in the 16th century.

Walker was born in Lichfield and educated at Lichfield Grammar School and Jesus College, Cambridge. He was appointed Archdeacon of Stafford in 1547, Archdeacon of Derby in 1549; and Dean of Chester in 1560.
