= William Nichols (English priest) =

English priest

William Nichols was a seventeenth-century English priest.

Mawdesley was born in London and educated at Trinity College, Cambridge. He was a Fellow of Caius from 1592 to 1600. He was Rector of Cheadle from 1624 to 1644; and was appointed Dean of Chester in 1644. He died on 16 December 1657.
