= Hugh Bright =

Former Archdeacon of Stafford

The Ven. Hugh Bright (1867 - 1935) was Archdeacon of Stafford from 1922 to 1933.

Bright was educated at Trinity College, Cambridge and Ripon College Cuddesdon. He was a curate of St Thomas, Winchester from 1891 to 1895; and then of All Souls’ Leeds from 1895 to 1901. He was Rector of Badsworth from 1901 to 1906; Vicar of King Cross from, 1906 to 1921; and a Canon Residentiary of Lichfield Cathedral from 1922 to 1933.

He died on 4 October 1935.
