= Nathaniel Ellison =

Anglican clergyman (1657–1721)

The Venerable Nathaniel Ellison, D.D. (Newcastle upon Tyne, 29 March 1657 – Whitburn, 12 June 1721) was an Anglican clergyman.

He was educated at St Edmund Hall, Oxford. He became a Fellow of Corpus Christi College, Oxford in 1678. Ellison was Chaplain to Thomas Wood, Bishop of Lichfield; and held livings at St. Lawrence, Towcester and St. Nicholas, Newcastle-on-Tyne. He was appointed Archdeacon of Stafford in 1682 and Canon of Durham Cathedral in 1712, holding both positions until his death.
