= Gordon McPhate =

British Anglican priest (born 1950)

The Very Reverend Gordon McPhate SOSc
- Dean of Chester
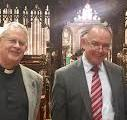
- McPhate (left) with Lord Bourne of Aberystwyth
- Church: Church of England
- Diocese: Diocese of Chester
- In office: 2002 to 2017
- Predecessor: Stephen Smalley
- Successor: Tim Stratford

Orders
- Ordination: 1978 (deacon); 1979 (priest)

Personal details
- Born: 1 June 1950 (age 76)
- Denomination: Anglicanism
- Education: University of Aberdeen; Westcott House, Cambridge; Fitzwilliam College, Cambridge; University of Surrey; University of Edinburgh

Gordon Ferguson McPhate (born 1 June 1950) is a British retired Anglican priest, physician and academic. He spent his early career combining medicine and academia, while also holding non-stipendiary clergy appointments. He then served as Dean of Chester from 2002 to 2017, before retiring.

== Biography ==
McPhate was born on 1 June 1950. He studied medicine at the University of Aberdeen, graduating with Bachelor of Medicine, Bachelor of Surgery (MB ChB) degrees in 1974. He was then a tutor in physiology at Clare College, Cambridge. During this, he also trained for ordination at Westcott House, Cambridge, and studied theology at Fitzwilliam College, Cambridge. He graduated from the University of Cambridge with a Bachelor of Arts (BA) degree in 1977; as per tradition, his BA was promoted to a Master of Arts (MA Cantab). He was ordained in the Church of England as a deacon in 1978 and as a priest in 1979.

In 1978, he joined Guy's Hospital Medical School as a lecturer in physiology. From 1978 to 1981, he served his curacy as a non-stipendiary minister in the Parish of Sanderstead, Diocese of Southwark. Then, from 1981 to 1986, he was an honorary priest vicar of Southwark Cathedral and a lecturer for the Diocese of London. In 1984, he moved to Guildford Hospital where he has been appointed registrar in pathology. In 1986, he was graduated with a Master of Science (MSc) degree from the University of Surrey. That year, also he returned to academia full-time, becoming a lecturer in physiology at the University of St Andrews. He also held a post in the university's chaplaincy as a priest of the Scottish Episcopal Church's Diocese of St Andrews, Dunkeld and Dunblane. He also continued his studies and was awarded a Doctor of Medicine (MD) research degree by the University of Cambridge in 1988. He was promoted to senior lecturer in experimental pathology in 1993, and was awarded a Master of Theology (MTh) degree in medical ethics by the University of Edinburgh in 1994. He was an honorary consultant chemical pathologist for Fife Hospitals between 1996 and 2002.

On 19 August 2002, McPhate was appointed Dean of Chester, the senior priest of Chester Cathedral, Diocese of Chester. This was the most senior appointment made of a clergyman who had "spent his life working in a non-church profession". In 2003, he was appointed honorary professor of theology and medicine at University College, Chester. He was also an honorary reader in medicine at the University of Liverpool from 2005 to 2008. He is a member of the Society of Ordained Scientists. He retired from full-time ministry on 30 September 2017. Since 2018, he has held permission to officiate in the Church in Wales' Diocese of Bangor. and at the Diocese of St Asaph

== Personal life ==
McPhate is unmarried. He has one adopted son, who first came to foster with him as a teenager in 1981.

Church of England titles
Preceded by Stephen Smalley	Dean of Chester; 2002–2017	Succeeded by Tim Stratford
