= Nicholas Sanders =

British priest (died 1581)

Nicholas Sanders (also spelled Sander; c. 1530 – 1581) was an English Catholic priest and polemicist.

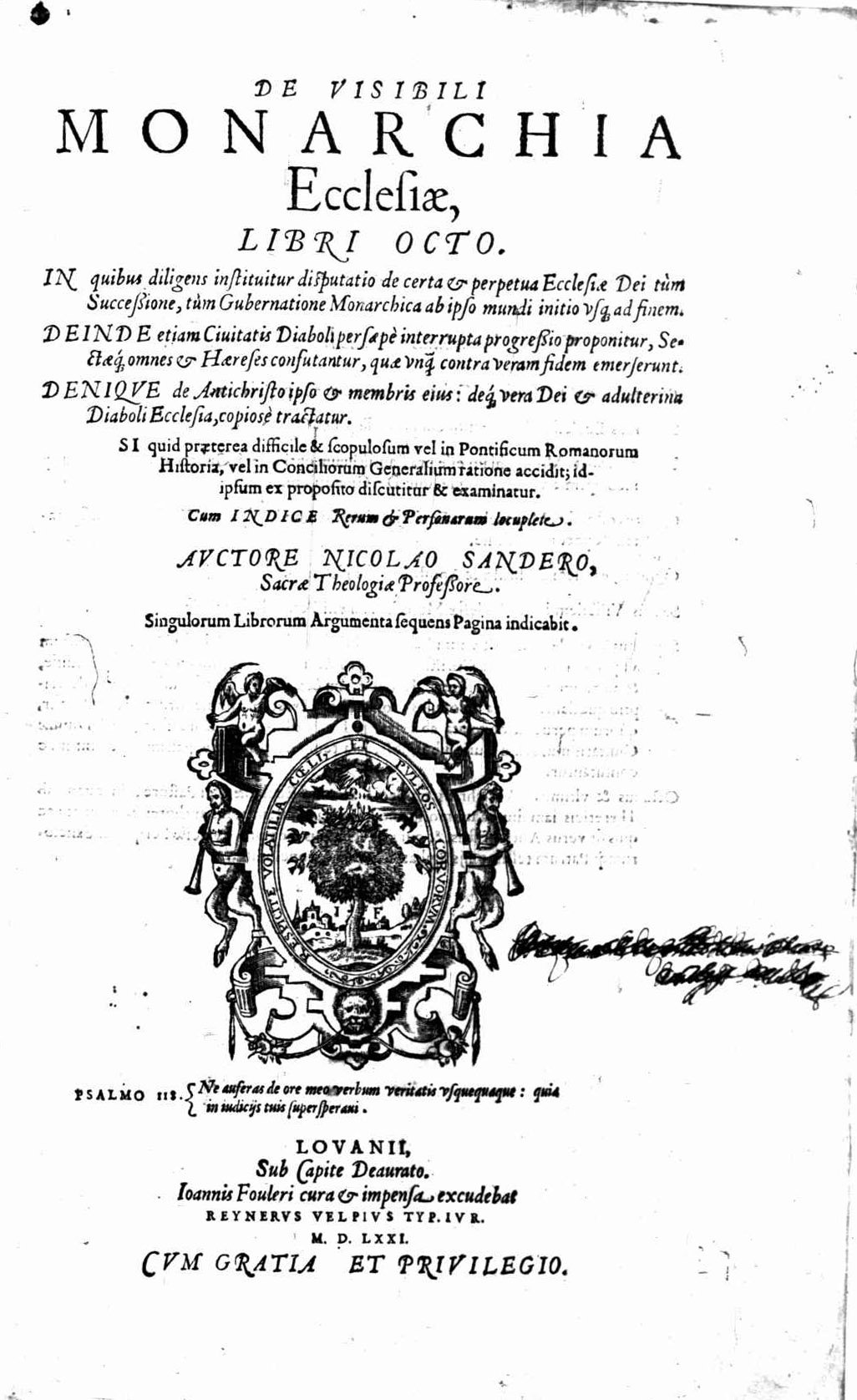
De visibili monarchia ecclesiae, 1571

== Early life ==
Sanders was born at Sander Place near Charlwood, Surrey, one of twelve children of William Sanders, once sheriff of Surrey, who was descended from the Sanders of Sanderstead. At the age of ten, Nicholas became a student at Hyde Abbey. Sanders was educated at Winchester College and New College, Oxford, where he was elected fellow in 1548 and graduated B.C.L. in 1551. The family had strong Roman Catholic leanings, and two of his elder sisters became nuns of Sion convent before its dissolution. Sanders was selected to deliver the oration at the reception of Cardinal Pole's visitors by the university in 1557. With the accession of Elizabeth I, Sanders went abroad around May 1559, with the guidance and financial support of Francis Englefield.

== Priesthood ==
In Rome, Sanders was befriended by Pole's confidant,Cardinal Morone; he also owed much to the generosity of Francis Englefield. Sanders was ordained a priest in Rome, and afterwards received the degree of Doctor of Divinity. Even before the end of 1550 had been mentioned as a likely cardinal. In 1560 he wrote a "Report on the State of England" for Cardinal Morone. He attended the Council of Trent as a theologian of Cardinal Hosius and afterwards accompanied him and Cardinal Commendone in legations to Poland, Prussia, and Lithuania.

In 1565, Fr. Sanders made his headquarters at Louvain, where his mother and his siblings joined him as refugees from anti-Catholic recusancy laws. His sister, Elizabeth Sanders, became a nun of Syon at Rouen. After a visit to the Imperial Diet at Augsburg in 1566 (in attendance upon Commendone, who had been largely instrumental in arranging the reconciliation of England with the Holy See during the reign of Queen Mary I), he threw himself into the literary controversy between Bishops John Jewel and Thomas Harding.

Fr. Sanders' De visibili Monarchia Ecclesiae, provided the first narrative of the sufferings of the English Catholics. It was published in 1571, in the aftermath of both Regnans in Excelsis and the Northern Rebellion.

== Plan for Irish expedition ==
In 1573 he went to Spain to urge Philip II to subsidise the exiles. He passed the following years at Madrid, where he was granted a pension of 300 ducats.

By 1575 James Fitzmaurice Fitzgerald had formed an alliance with Sir Thomas Stukley to launch a projected 1578 Irish expedition, which Sanders was to have accompanied. The plan was supported by papal nuncio Filippo Sega with the covert encouragement of King Philip. Fitzgerald and Stukley were to rendezvous at Lisbon, where King Sebastian of Portugal convinced Stukley to participate in a campaign in Morocco instead. Stukley abandoned the Irish invasion and sailed his troops to Morocco, where he was killed at the Battle of Alcácer Quibir in August 1578.

Sanders and Fitzmaurice landed a force of some 600 Spanish and Italian freelance troops with arms for 4,000 rebels and covert Papal support at Smerwick harbour in Ireland, launching the Second Desmond Rebellion. Sanders paraded the papal banner at Dingle before trying to arm local Irish clans and Gerald FitzGerald, 15th Earl of Desmond and others seeking their backing, but they never linked up. The invasion fleet was immediately captured by Sir William Wynter, and in November 1580 the troops already at Smerwick were massacred by the Irish Royal Army under Arthur Grey, 14th Baron Grey de Wilton, after the 3-day Siege of Smerwick. As Spain and the Papacy were not formally at war with England, Fr. Sanders and his men were declared outlaws. Fr. Sanders himself escaped into the hills.

Grey's report from Smerwick mentioned Sanders' involvement: Execution of the Englishman who served Dr. Sanders, and two others, whose arms and legs were broken for torture.

After spending months as a fugitive in the south-west of Ireland, Sanders is believed to have died of cold and starvation in the spring of 1581.

== De origine ac progressu schismatis Anglicani ==
The writings of Sanders formed the basis of later Catholic histories of the English Reformation, and its martyrology. His major work in this direction was his unfinished De origine ac progressu schismatis Anglicani (Of the Origin and Progression of the English Schism). This had many editions, and was used as a basis for other works, starting with its continuation after 1558 by Edward Rishton, supposedly printed at Cologne in 1585, actually by Jean Foigny at Reims.

The sources and production of De origine are complex. The "Jodochus Skarnhert" of Cologne involved in it has been tentatively identified with Robert Persons, who worked on the second edition of 1586. William Allen is now assumed to have had a large editorial role from the start. Rishton acted as an editor, and moved De origine towards martyrology. The materials for the second edition included the prison journal of the Jesuit John Hart, which has been attributed incorrectly to Rishton; from the third edition it was not used, and the suggestion is that Persons by then knew that Hart had become an agent of Queen Elizabeth I's spymaster Francis Walsingham. Other sources included: the writings of Reginald Pole on the English Reformation; a life of John Fisher; Cochlaeus writing against Richard Morison; and Richard Hilliard.

Catholic writers who took up the content of De origine included Girolamo Pollini, Andrea Sciacca, Bernardo Davanzati, Pedro de Ribadeneira, and François Maucroix. British Protestant reactions included that of Peter Heylin, who called Sanders "Dr Slanders", and Gilbert Burnet who was prompted into his History of the Reformation at the end of the 17th century.

== Works ==
- De visibili monarchia ecclesiae (in Latin). Leuven: John Fowler. 1571.
- De origine et progressu schismatis Anglicani, 1585.

== External Source ==
- Dr Nicholas Sanders Rise and growth of the Anglican schism published 1877
