= Robert Hodgson (archdeacon of Stafford) =

English clergyman (1844–1917)

The Ven. Robert Hodgson (11 July 1844, Hoxne, Suffolk, England – 29 January 1917, Lichfield, Staffordshire, England) was Archdeacon of Stafford from 1898 to 1910.

Hodgson was educated at Eton and Oriel College, Oxford and ordained in 1869.

After a curacy in Stoke-upon-Trent he held incumbencies at West Bromwich, Walsall and Handsworth. In 1907 he became a residentiary canon at Lichfield Cathedral.
