= James Brooks (priest) =

James Brooks (1704–1763) was an Anglican clergyman.

Brooks was born in Oxford and educated at Christ Church there. He was Archdeacon of Stafford from 1732 until his death.
