= Edward Rishton =

English priest

Edward Rishton (1550 – 29 June 1585) was an English Roman Catholic priest.

== Life ==
He was born in Lancashire, probably a younger son of John Rishton of Dunkenhalgh and Dorothy Southworth. He studied at the University of Oxford from 1568 to 1572, when he proceeded B.A. probably from Brasenose College. During the next year he was converted to Catholicism, and went to Douai College to study for the priesthood.

He was the first Englishman to matriculate at Douai, and is said to have taken his M.A. degree there. While a student he drew up and published a chart of ecclesiastical history, and was one of the two sent to Reims in November, 1576, to see if the college could be removed there. After his ordination at Cambrai (6 April 1576) he was sent to Rome.

In 1580 he returned to England, visiting Reims on the way, but was soon arrested. He was tried and condemned to death with Edmund Campion and others on 20 November 1581, but was not executed, being left in prison, first in the King's Bench prison, then in the Tower of London. On 21 January he was exiled with several others, being sent under escort as far as Abbeville, whence he made his way to Reims, arriving on 3 March.

With the intention of taking his doctorate in divinity he proceeded to the University of Pont-à-Mousson in Lorraine, but the plague broke out, and though he went to Sainte-Ménehould, to escape the infection, he died of it and was buried there.

== Works ==
At the suggestion of Robert Persons, he completed Nicholas Sanders's imperfect Origin and Growth of the Anglican Schism. After his death this book was published by Father Persons, and subsequent editions included two tracts attributed to Rishton, the one a diary of an anonymous priest in the Tower (1580-5), which was probably the work of Father John Hart, S.J.; the other a list of martyrs with later additions by Persons.

Publication of the "Tower Bills" makes it certain that Rishton did not write the diary, and his only other known works are a tract on the difference between Catholicism and Protestantism (Douai, 1575) and Profession of his faith made manifest and confirmed by twenty-one reasons.
