= Broadoak School =

Location
- Warburton Lane; Partington; Greater Manchester, M31 4BU; England
- Coordinates: 53.41216°N 2.43097°W

Information
- Type: Academy
- Local authority: Trafford Council
- Department for Education URN: 138124 Tables
- Ofsted: Reports
- Gender: Coeducational
- Age: 11 to 16
- Website: http://broadoakschool.thedeantrust.co.uk/

Broadoak School is a coeducational secondary school with academy status located in Partington in the English county of Greater Manchester.

Previously a foundation school administered by Trafford Metropolitan Borough Council, Broadoak School converted to academy status on 1 May 2012. The school now forms part of The Dean Trust which also includes Ashton-on-Mersey School in Sale, Forest Gate Academy in Partington and Lord Derby Academy in Huyton.

Broadoak School has a non-selective intake, and offers GCSEs and BTECs as programmes of study for pupils.
