= Geoffrey Blythe (divine) =

English divine

Geoffrey Blythe, LL.D. (died 1542), was an English divine.

Blythe is supposed to have been a nephew of Geoffrey Blythe, bishop of Lichfield and Coventry. He was educated at Eton, and elected thence to King's College, Cambridge, in 1515 (B.A. 1520–1; M.A. 1523). He became a prebendary of Lichfield in 1520, and was appointed master of King's Hall, Cambridge, in 1528, in which year he occurs as vicar of Chesterton, Cambridgeshire.

In 1529 he commenced LL.D., and his grace for that degree states that he had studied at Louvain. He held the archdeaconry of Stafford for a few days in 1530, and on 7 June in that year he was admitted treasurer of the church of Lichfield, with which he held the precentorship. Blythe was one of the divines who preached at Cambridge against Hugh Latimer. He was buried at All Saints', Cambridge, on 8 March 1541–2.
