= Richard Ninis =

The Ven. Richard Betts Ninis (25 October 1931 - 15 October 2014) was Archdeacon of Lichfield and Canon Treasurer of Lichfield Cathedral from 1974 to 1998.

Ninis was educated at Lincoln College, Oxford. After a curacy at All Saints, Poplar he was Vicar of St Martin, Hereford from 1962 to 197. He was Diocesan Missioner for Hereford from 1971 to 74. He was Chairman of the USPG from 1988 to 1991.
