= Dean Trust Wigan =

Location
- Greenhey; Orrell; Wigan, Greater Manchester, WN5 0DQ; England
- Coordinates: 53.54094°N 2.68827°W

Information
- Type: Academy
- Local authority: Wigan Council
- Department for Education URN: 144519 Tables
- Ofsted: Reports
- Head teacher: Jen Evans
- Gender: Coeducational
- Age: 11 to 16
- Enrolment: 791 as of March 2024
- Website: www.deantrustwigan.co.uk

Dean Trust Wigan, formerly Abraham Guest Academy and Abraham Guest High School, is a coeducational secondary school with academy status located in the Orrell area of the Metropolitan Borough of Wigan, Greater Manchester.The school has been shortlisted as Wigan and Leigh Secondary school of the year for 2021. It is part of The Dean Trust.

== History ==
Previously a foundation school administered by Wigan Metropolitan Borough Council, Abraham Guest High School converted to academy status in January 2012, having been controlled by the governing body of Winstanley College via the Winstanley Abraham Guest Trust, and also as an academy sponsor until it was taken over by The Dean Trust, at which point it was renamed Dean Trust Wigan in April 2017 as it joined a trust of good and outstanding schools across the North West, however it continues to coordinate with Wigan Metropolitan Borough Council for admissions. The school used to offer adult education courses in the evening.

== Academic Offerings ==
DTW offers GCSEs, BTECs and vocational courses as programmes of study for pupils. The school also offers adult budget cooking sessions after school hours.

== Notable alumni ==
- Stefan Ratchford - Warrington rugby league player
