= Chris Liley =

Religious leader in England (born 1947)

The Ven. Christopher Frank (Chris) Liley (born 1947) was Archdeacon of Lichfield from 2001 until 2013.

Liley was educated at the University of Nottingham and Lincoln Theological College; and ordained in 1975. After a curacy in Kingswinford he held incumbencies at Stafford, Norton, Hertfordshire and Shrewsbury. In retirement he is responsible for elderly clergy within the Diocese of Worcester.
