= Robert Dorset =

English priest

Robert Dorset was a Sixteenth-century English priest.

Dorset was educated at Christ Church, Oxford. He was appointed Rector of Winwick in 1572, and of Ewelme in 1574. He was Dean of Chester from 1579 until his death on 29 May 1580.
