= John Carver (Archdeacon of Surrey) =

The Ven John Carver, MA (1741 – 1814) was an Anglican Archdeacon.

== Life ==
Carver's father John Carver, of Westminster, was an illegitimate son of John Carver of St' George's, Hanover Square; whose daughter and heiress Mary married John Ward, 1st Viscount Dudley and Ward, as his second wife.

Carver was educated at Oriel College, Oxford, where he matriculated in 1759. He held livings at Dudley, Himley, Hartlebury and Kingswinford; and was Archdeacon of Stafford from 1769 to 1782, and of Surrey from 1795 until his death on 1 August 1814. His daughter Elizabeth Carver married Charles Peter Layard as his second wife and survived him.

== Notes ==
Church of England titles
Preceded by Edmund Law	Archdeacon of Stafford; 1769–11782	Succeeded by William Brereton
Preceded by John Butler	Archdeacon of Surrey; 1795–1807	Succeeded by Thomas de Grey
