= Stephen Smalley =

English Anglican clergyman and scholar (1931–2024)

Stephen Stewart Smalley (11 May 1931 – 19 May 2024) was an English Anglican clergyman and scholar who was Dean of Chester in the last part of the 20th century and the first year of the 21st.

== Biography ==
Born in London in 1931, educated at Jesus College, Cambridge, and ordained in 1958, Stephen was a curate at St Paul's, Portman Square, and then Chaplain and later Acting Dean of Peterhouse, Cambridge. From 1960 to 1969 he was a lecturer at the University of Ibadan, Nigeria. He returned to the U.K. to become lecturer and then senior lecturer at the University of Manchester from 1977 to 1986, and served at the same time as Warden of St Anselm Hall. Before his elevation to the Deanery of Chester in 1987, Stephen was Canon Residentiary of Coventry Cathedral, where he was appointed Canon Precentor and latterly Vice Provost of the cathedral.

At Chester Cathedral, Dean Smalley oversaw a period of radical reform and renewal. Following the theme of Continuity and Change, he overhauled both the fabric and the liturgy of the city's famous medieval building to improve its appeal and accessibility for residents and visitors alike. Working closely with the Chapter, consultants and members of staff, he expanded and renovated the shop and Refectory restaurant, and opened a new Visitors’ Centre in the disused undercroft, while firmly maintaining an established free entry policy. During this period, visitor numbers increased to an all-time high of nearly one million.

In 1992, to celebrate 900 years of worship and activity since the foundation of the Abbey of St Werburgh on the same site, the Dean launched ´Building for Tomorrow´, a city and countywide Appeal for funds to restore the cathedral to its former glory, while making it fit for purpose in the new millennium. During this creative period Stephen also introduced a new Girls’ choir, designed colourful modern vestments, supported and took part in Chester's medieval cycle of Mystery Plays, and appeared on regional and national television, most notably in the BBC's flagship religious programme, Songs of Praise.

Whilst Dean Smalley's innovative ideas courted controversy among traditionalists, at the same time he became known and respected for his desire to strengthen the role of the Cathedral in and beyond the City itself. He was a passionate advocate of ecumenical outreach, and developed close links with Ampleforth (Roman Catholic) Abbey. He also encouraged the cathedral to adopt an international perspective, establishing a fruitful partnership with the Melanesian Brotherhood in the Solomon Islands, for example, and helping to facilitate bursaries for some of its members to study at what is now Chester University.

In the city, the Dean was a member of the university's Governing Body, as well as Chairman of Governors at The King's School. He was also involved with several educational institutions in Chester, such as the Blue Coat Foundation. He was invited to become a member of Chester City Club and of Chester Business Club. Perhaps his lasting legacy was to create what became known as ´The Dean's Breakfast´, a forum intended to bring together influential leaders from the private, public and third sectors to respond caringly to current economic, social and faith issues.

Following his retirement from Chester Cathedral in 2001, Stephen Smalley continued his academic work and ministry over the next two decades in a variety of contexts. He regularly preached and took services at local churches and benefices in the Dioceses of Gloucester and Chester, and continued to teach theology, notably as a visiting professor at Chester University. He also turned his hand to writing crime fiction, including a novel based on his time at Cambridge, as well as stories for children.

Smalley played a leading role in the 150th anniversary celebration of the founding of St. Paul's Church in Helsby, the parish in which he spent the latter part of his retirement. His final acts of service were to commission the replacement of the standards of St George and the Union Jack in the church grounds, and to officiate at the installation of The Reverend Noel McGarrigle as Vicar of St. Paul's, on 3 July 2023.

Smalley died at Chapel Fields Care Home in Frodsham, Cheshire, on Pentecost Sunday 19 May 2024, at the age of 93.

== Publications ==
- Smalley, Stephen S. (1984). John, evangelist and interpreter. Nashville: T. Nelson. ISBN 0-8407-5906-1. OCLC 10824781.
- Smalley, Stephen S. (1994). Thunder and love : John's Revelation and John's community. Milton Keynes, England: Word Pub. ISBN 0-85009-606-5. OCLC 32719707.
- Smalley, Stephen S. (2005). The revelation to John : a commentary on the Greek text of the apocalypse. Downers Grove, Ill.: InterVarsity Press. ISBN 0-8308-2800-1. OCLC 61720086.
- Smalley, Stephen S. (2005). Hope for ever : the Christian view of life and death. Bletchley, Milton Keynes, UK: Paternoster. ISBN 1-84227-358-2. OCLC 64225010.

== Notes ==
Church of England titles
Preceded by Thomas Wood Ingram Cleasby	Dean of Chester; 1987–2001	Succeeded by Gordon Ferguson McPhate
