= John Rainolds =

English theologian (1549–1607)

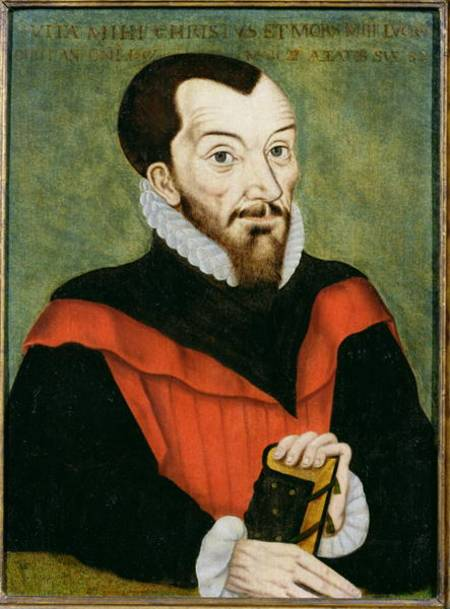
- Born: 1549; Pinhoe, Exeter
- Died: 21 May 1607 (aged 57–58)
- Education: Corpus Christi College, Oxford
- Known for: Work on the King James Bible

John Rainolds (or Reynolds) (1549 – 21 May 1607) was an English academic and churchman, of Puritan views. He is remembered for his role in the Authorised Version of the Bible, a project of which he was initiator.

== Life ==
He was born about Michaelmas 1549 at Pinhoe, near Exeter. He was fifth son of Richard Rainolds; William Rainolds was his brother. His uncle Thomas Rainolds held the living of Pinhoe from 1530 to 1537, and was subsequently Warden of Merton College, Oxford, and Dean of Exeter. John Rainolds appears to have entered the University of Oxford originally at Merton, but on 29 April 1563 he was elected to a scholarship at Corpus Christi College, where two of his brothers, Hierome and Edmond, were already fellows. He became probationary fellow on 11 October 1566, and full fellow two years later. While a student at Corpus, he converted from Catholicism to Protestantism.

On 15 October 1568 he graduated B.A.; and about this time he was assigned as tutor to Richard Hooker. In 1566 he played the female role of Hippolyta in a performance of the play Palamon and Arcite at Oxford, as part of an elaborate entertainment for Queen Elizabeth I. She rewarded him with 8 gold angels. Rainolds later recalled this youthful role with embarrassment, as he came to support Puritan objections to the theatre, being particularly critical of cross-dressing roles.

In 1572–73 Rainolds was appointed reader in Greek, and his lectures on Aristotle's Rhetoric made his reputation. In 1576 he objected to the proposal that Antonio de Corro should be allowed to proceed Doctor of Divinity; and at the same time he was instrumental in having Francesco Pucci expelled from the university, Pucci being an associate and ally of Corro, who had moved against orthodox Calvinist positions. Rainolds resigned his readership in 1578. The popular, young scholar was promoted as a candidate for college president by many university authorities in 1579, when it was thought to be an opening for the position.

In the early 1580s, in the aftermath of Edmund Campion's strenuous defence of Catholic principles, Francis Walsingham sent the Jesuit John Hart to Rainolds for an extended discussion. Hart conceded to Rainolds on the deposing power of the Pope, at least according to the Protestant perspective, and an account was published in The summe of the conference betweene John Rainoldes and John Hart (1584). Unable to agree with the president of Corpus, William Cole, Rainolds then gave up his fellowship in 1586, and became a tutor at Queen's College. In the same year Rainolds was appointed to a temporary lectureship, founded by Walsingham, for anti-Catholic polemical theology.

In 1589 the Regius Chair of Divinity at Oxford fell vacant. Rainolds had reason to anticipate the position would be his, but the Queen objected, and Thomas Holland was appointed. Rainolds's lectureship was continued by Walsingham.

By this time he had acquired a considerable reputation as a disputant on the Puritan side, and the story goes that Elizabeth I visiting the university in 1592 "schooled him for his obstinate preciseness, willing him to follow her laws, and not run before them."

In 1593 Rainolds was made dean of Lincoln College, Oxford and/or of Lincoln Cathedral. The fellows of Corpus were anxious to replace Cole with Rainolds, and an exchange was effected, Rainolds being elected president in December 1598.

== Creation of the King James Version of the Bible ==
The chief events of his subsequent career were his share in the Hampton Court Conference, where he was the most prominent representative of the Puritan party and received a good deal of favour from the King.

During the Conference, the Puritans, led by Rainolds as spokesperson, directly questioned James about their grievances. However, almost every request brought forward by Rainolds was immediately denied or disputed by James. At some point during the course of Rainolds' pleading before the king, Rainolds made a request that "one only translation of the Bible . . . [be] declared authentical, and read in the church". Whether Rainolds was asking for a new translation or simply for a direction to authorize only one of the existing English translations, most took Rainolds' words as a request for the former. James readily agreed to a new translation.

During the creation of the subsequent drafting of the new translation of the Bible, Rainolds worked as a part of the group which undertook the translation of the Prophets. The group met weekly in Rainolds' lodgings in Corpus. Despite being afflicted by failing eyesight and gout, Rainolds continued the work of translation to the end of his life, even being carried into the meeting room.

== Death ==
Rainolds died of consumption on 21 May 1607, leaving a great reputation for scholarship and high character. On his deathbed he earnestly desired absolution according to the form of the Church of England, and received it from Dr. Thomas Holland (translator), whose hand he affectionately kissed. He is buried in the chapel of Corpus Christi.

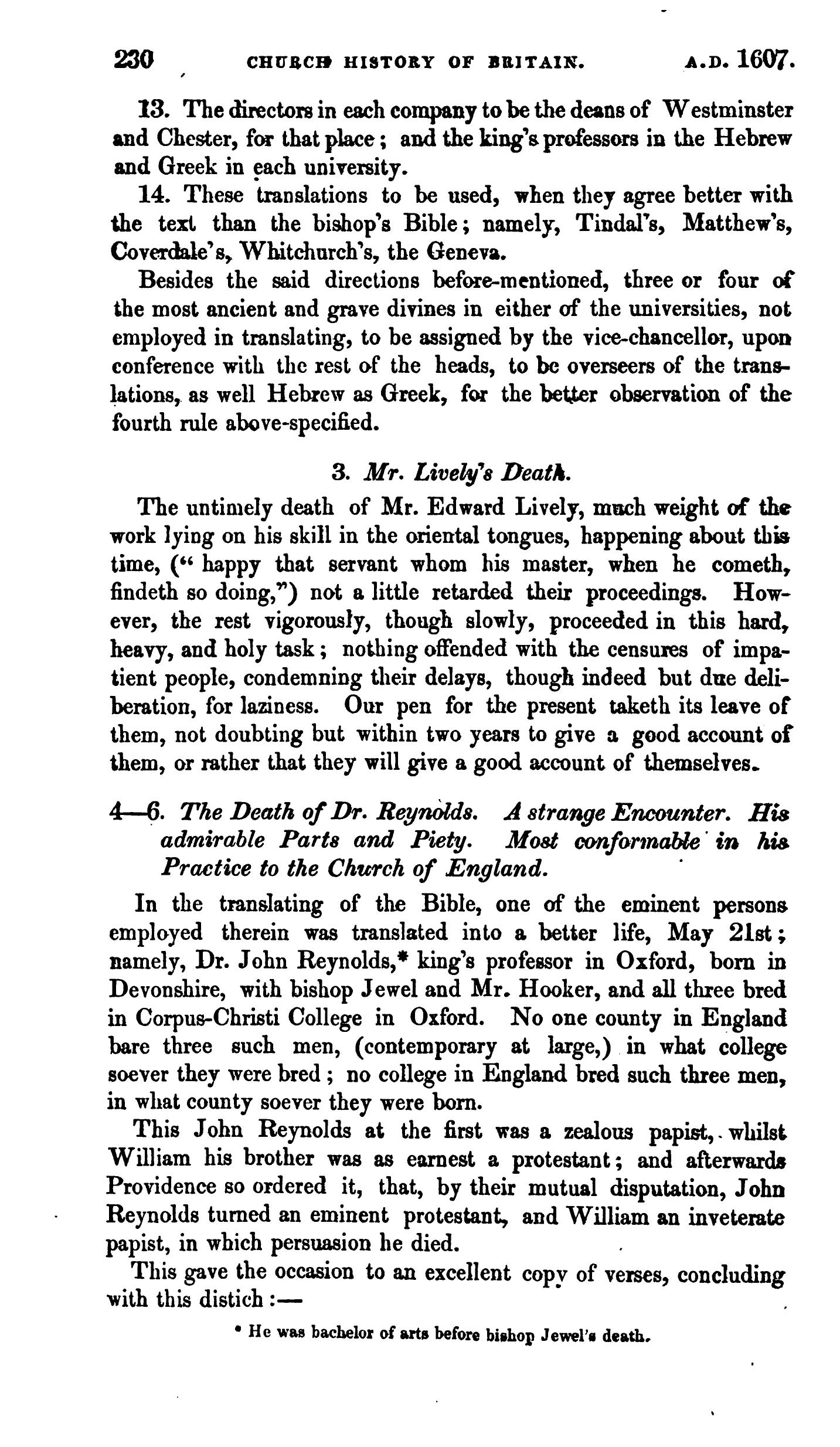
The Church History of Britain by Thomas Fuller (1837) page 1

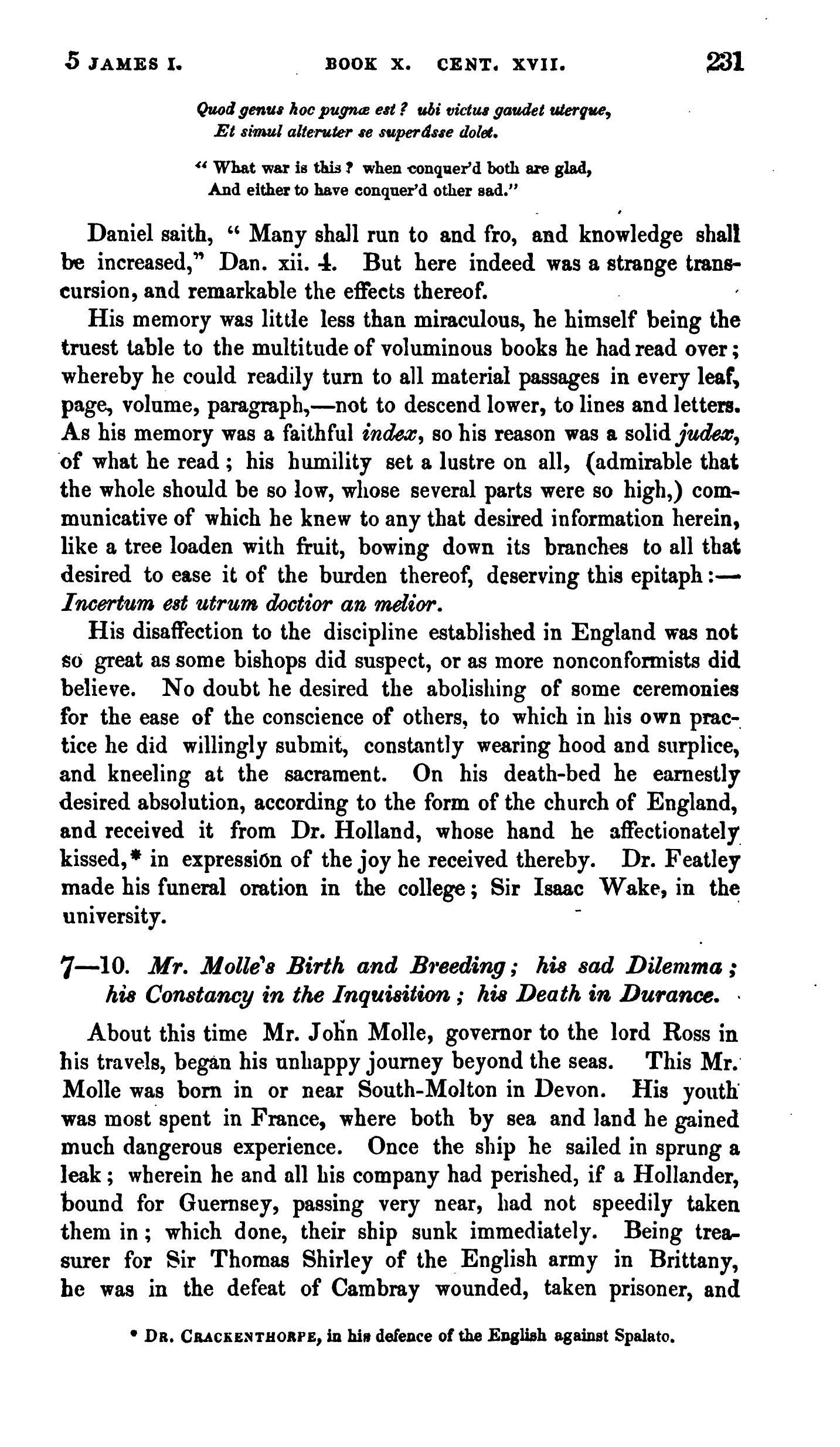
...continued

== Works ==
- De Romanae ecclesiae idolatria (1596), dedicated to Robert Devereux, 2nd Earl of Essex, supporter of his theology lectures.
- John Rainolds's Oxford Lectures on Aristotle’s Rhetoric, Edited and Translated with Commentary by Lawrence D. Green, Newark: University of Delaware Press, 1986.

Academic offices
Preceded by William Cole	President of Corpus Christi College, Oxford; 1598–1607	Succeeded by John Spenser
