= Tim Stratford =

British Anglican priest and author

The Very Reverend Dr Tim Stratford
- Dean of Chester
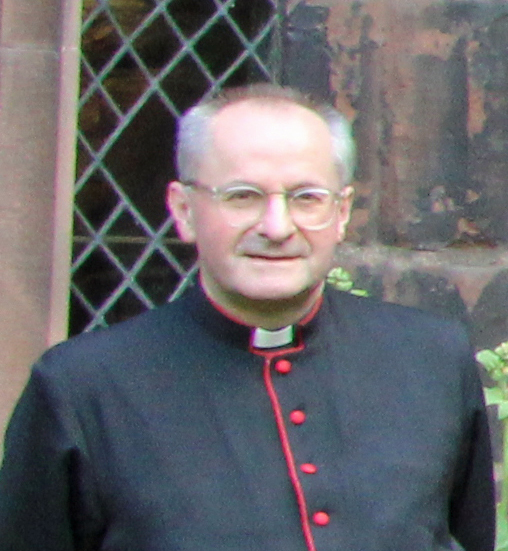
- Stratford in 2023
- Church: Church of England
- In office: 2018 to present
- Predecessor: Gordon McPhate
- Other post: Archdeacon of Leicester (2012–2018)

Orders
- Ordination: 1986 (deacon); 1987 (priest)

Personal details
- Born: Timothy Richard Stratford; 26 February 1961 (age 65)
- Denomination: Anglicanism

Timothy Richard Stratford (born 26 February 1961) is an Anglican priest and author. Since 2018, he has been Dean of Chester in the Church of England. He was previously Archdeacon of Leicester from 2012 to 2018.

== Early life and education ==
Stratford was born on 26 February 1961 in Liverpool, England. He was educated at Knowsley Hey School, a comprehensive school in Huyton, Merseyside. He studied at the University of Leicester, graduating with a Bachelor of Science (BSc) degree in 1982, and trained for ordination at Wycliffe Hall, Oxford. He later studied for a Doctor of Philosophy (PhD) degree at the University of Sheffield, submitting his doctorate in 2008: his thesis was titled "Urban liturgy in the Church of England: a historical, theological and anthropological analysis of the mid-Victorian slum priest ritualists and their legacy".

== Ordained ministry ==
He was ordained deacon in 1986 and priest in 1987. After curacies in Mossley Hill and St Helens he was chaplain to David Sheppard, Bishop of Liverpool from 1991 to 1994. He was vicar of West Derby from 1994 to 2003; and team rector of Kirkby from 2003 to 2012. He was Archdeacon of Leicester from 2012 until his installation as Dean of Chester on 8 September 2018.

On 7 June 2024, he officiated the wedding of Hugh Grosvenor, 7th Duke of Westminster and Olivia Grace Henson.

== Personal life ==
In 1986, Stratford married Jennifer. They have three sons.

== Selected works ==
Amongst others he has written:

- Interactive Preaching (1998)
- Liturgy and Technology (1999)
- Liturgy and Urban Mission (2002)
- Using Common Worship: a service of the word (2002)
- Worship Window of the Urban Church (2006)

Church of England titles
Preceded by Richard Atkinson	Archdeacon of Leicester; 2012–2018	Succeeded by Richard Worsfold
Preceded by Gordon McPhate	Dean of Chester; 2018–present	Incumbent
