= Dean of Chester =

Church of England senior clergy member

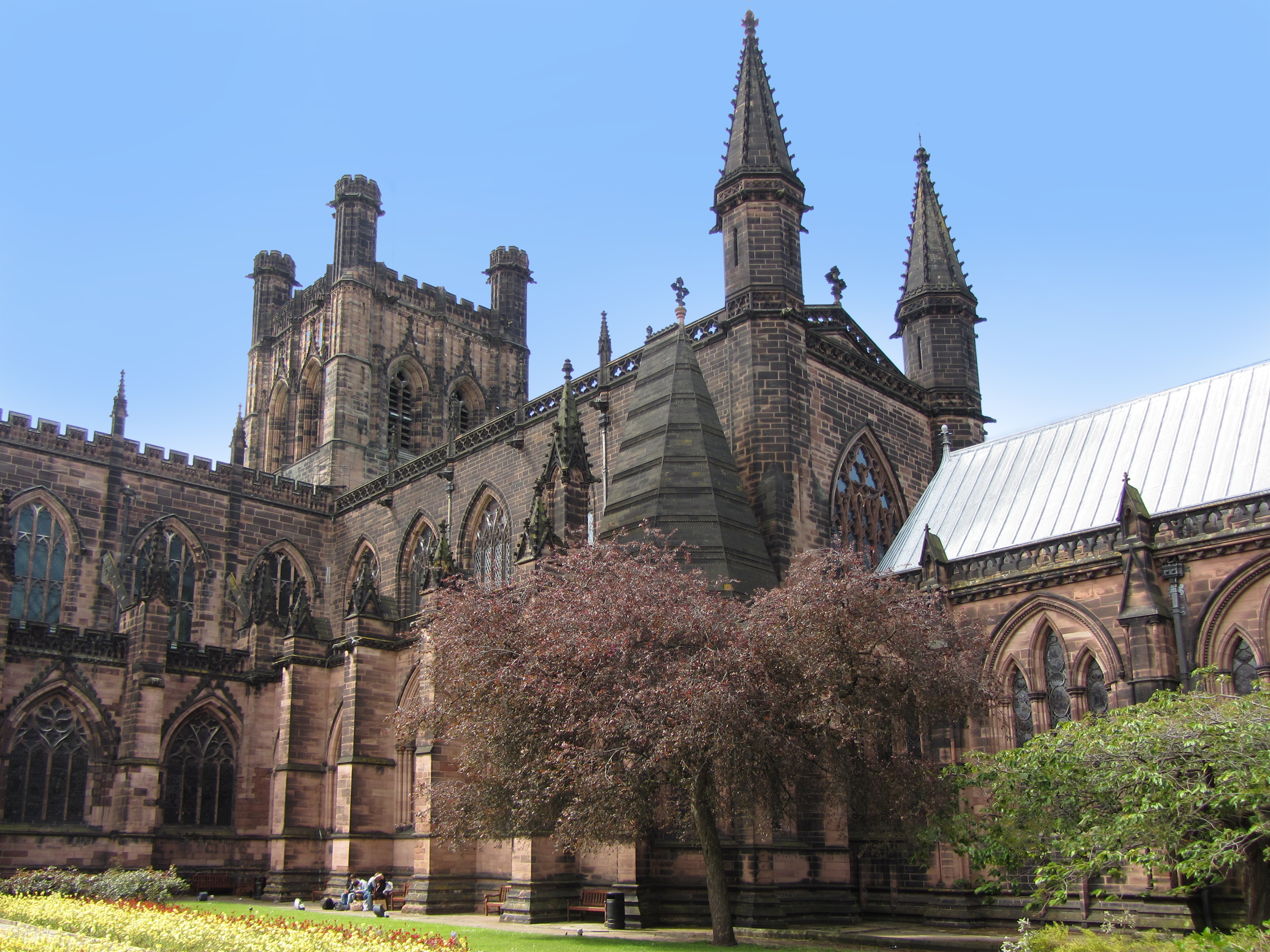
Chester Cathedral

The Dean of Chester is based at Chester Cathedral in the Diocese of Chester and is the head of the Chapter at the cathedral.

== List of deans ==
=== Early modern ===
- 1541 Thomas Clerk (first Dean of Chester)
- 1541–1547 Henry Man (afterwards Bishop of Sodor and Man 1546)
- 1547–1558 William Clyff
- 1560–1567 Richard Walker
- 1567–1572 John Piers (afterwards Dean of Salisbury 1572)
- 1572–1579 Richard Longworth
- 1579–1580 Robert Dorset
- 1580–1589 Thomas Mawdesley
- 1589–1602 John Nutter
- 1602–1605 William Barlow (afterwards Bishop of Rochester 1605)
- 1605–1607 Henry Parry (afterwards Bishop of Gloucester 1607)
- 1607–1644 Thomas Mallory
- 1644–1657 William Nichols
- 1660–1682 Henry Bridgeman (also Bishop of Sodor and Man 1671)
- 1682–1691 James Arderne
- 1691–1718 Lawrence Fogg
- 1718–1721 Walter Offley
- 1721–1732 Thomas Allen
- 1732–1758 Thomas Brooke
- 1758–1787 William Smith
- 1787–1805 George Cotton

=== Late modern ===
- 1806–1815 Hugh Cholmondeley
- 1815-1820 Robert Hodgson (afterwards Dean of Carlisle 1820)
- 1820–1826 Peter Vaughan
- 1826–1828 Edward Coplestone (afterwards Bishop of Llandaff 1828)
- 1828–1831 Henry Phillpotts (afterwards Bishop of Exeter 1831)
- 1831–1839 George Davys (afterwards Bishop of Peterborough 1839)
- 1839–1867 Frederick Anson
- 1867–1885 John Howson
- 1886–1919 John Darby
- 1920–1937 Frank Bennett
- 1937–1953 Norman Tubbs (Assistant Bishop until 1948)
- 1954–1962 Michael Gibbs
- 1963–1977 George Addleshaw
- 1978–1986 Ingram Cleasby
- 1987–2001 Stephen Smalley
- 2002 – 30 September 2017 (ret.) Gordon McPhate
- 2017–2018 (Acting) Jane Brooke
- 8 September 2018 – present Tim Stratford

== Sources ==
- 'Deans of Chester', Fasti Ecclesiae Anglicanae 1541-1857: volume 11: Carlisle, Chester, Durham, Manchester, Ripon, and Sodor and Man dioceses (2004) accessed 2011-01-24
