= Thomas Brooke (priest) =

English Anglican priest

Thomas Brooke (4 June 1684 – 17 August 1757) was an English Anglican priest, most notably Dean of Chester from 1732 until his death.

Brooke was born in Brereton, Cheshire and educated at St Catharine's College, Cambridge. He held livings at Winslow, Nantwich and Dodleston.
