= Laurence Fogg =

English dean

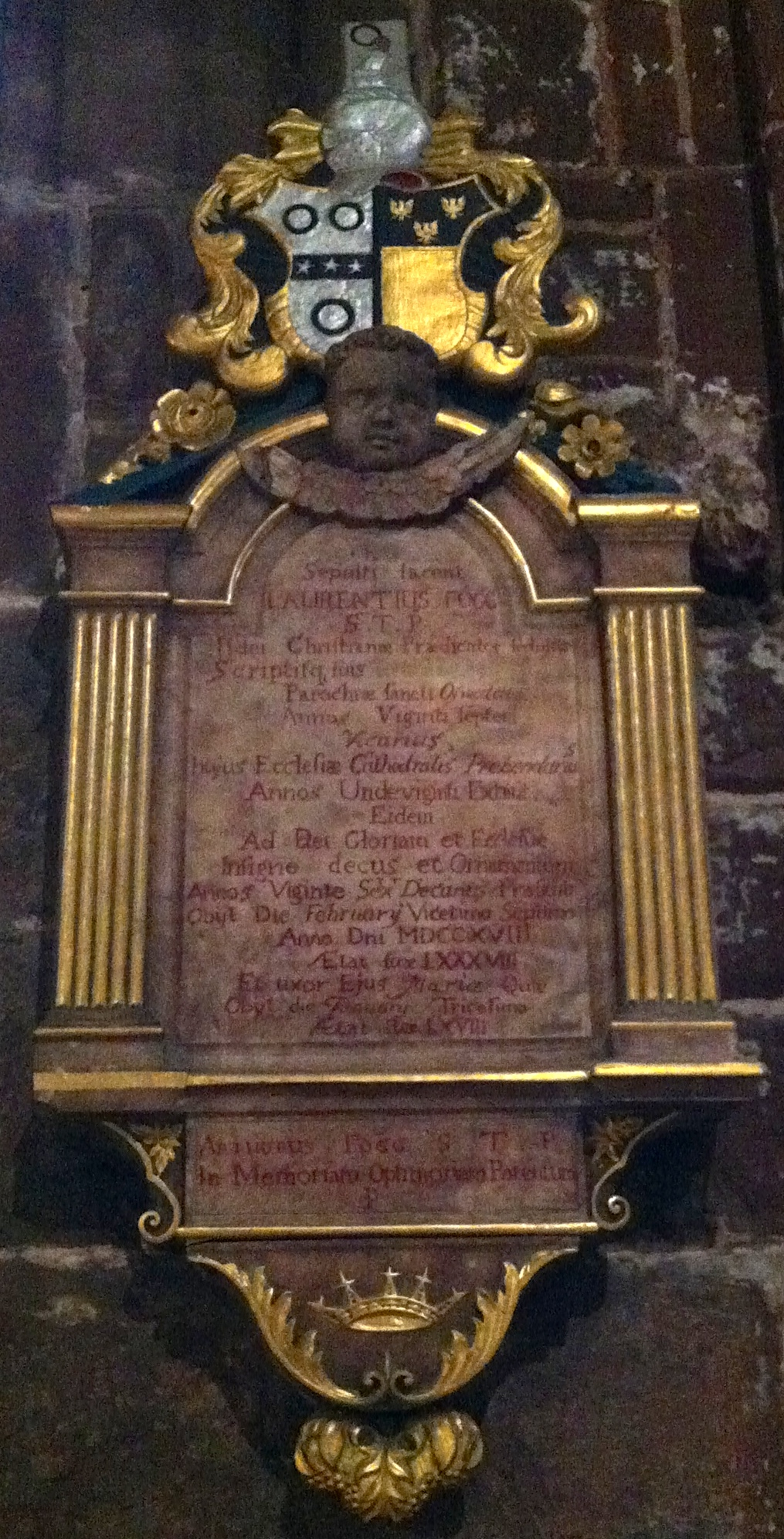
Memorial to Laurence Fogg in Chester Cathedral

Laurence Fogg or Fogge (1623–1718) was dean of Chester.

Fogg, son of Robert Fogg (who was an active worker for the parliament, rector of Bangor-is-y-Coed, Flintshire, ejected 1662, died 1676), was born at Darcy Lever, in the parish of Bolton, in 1623, and educated at Bolton Grammar School and at Cambridge. He was admitted pensioner of Emmanuel College on 28 September 1644, and was afterwards of St John's College. He held the office of taxor of the university in 1657. The degree of D.D. was granted to him in 1679.

He was appointed rector of Hawarden, Flintshire, in 1655 or 1656, and was among the first who restored the public use of the liturgy. In 1662 he resigned his living, owing to an apparent ambiguity in an act of parliament relating to subscription, but he afterwards conformed. He preached at Oldham on 20 May 1666, being then curate of Prestwich, and described as theol. baccal. In 1672 he was appointed vicar of St. Oswald's, Chester, and on 4 October 1673 was inducted prebendary of Chester Cathedral. In the latter year he became vicar of Plemonstall, Cheshire, on the presentation of Orlando Bridgeman, the lord keeper, and on 14 November 1691 was installed dean of Chester.

A candid, sober-minded churchman, he was well-regarded by more moderate dissenters, with whom he was on close terms. Philip Henry and Matthew Henry both refer to him with appreciation. The latter in 1698 listened to one of Fogg's sermons with 'singular delight.' 'I have from my heart forgiven,’ he writes, 'so I will endeavour to forget all that the dean has at any time said against dissenters, and against me in particular.'

He died on 27 February 1717–18, and was buried in Chester Cathedral, where a monument to his memory was erected by his son Arthur (1668–1738), prebendary of Chester.

== Works ==
- Two Treatises; i. A General View of the Christian Religion; ii. An Entrance into the Doctrine of Christianity by Catechistical Instruction, Chester, 1712, 8vo.
- Theologiæ Speculativæ Schema, Lond. 1712, 8vo.
- God's Infinite Grace in Election, and Impartial Equity in Preterition Vindicated, Chester, 1713, 8vo.
