= Thomas Mallory (priest) =

English priest

Thomas Mallory was a seventeenth-century English priest.

Mawdesley was born at Studley Yorkshire and educated at Trinity College, Cambridge. He was a Fellow of Caius from 1592 to 1600. He held livings at Romaldkirk and Davenham. He was Archdeacon of Richmond from 1603 to 1607; and Dean of Chester from then until his death on 3 April 1644.
