= Murder of Anthony Walker =

2005 crime in Huyton, England

Anthony Walker
- Born: Anthony Delano Walker; 21 February 1987; Huyton, England
- Died: 30 July 2005 (aged 18); Liverpool, England
- Cause of death: Axe wound to head
- Occupation: A-level student

Anthony Delano Walker (21 February 1987 – 30 July 2005) was a Black British student of Jamaican descent who was murdered with an ice axe by Michael Barton (brother of footballer Joey Barton) and Barton's cousin Paul Taylor, in an unprovoked attack on the night of 29 July 2005 in Huyton, Merseyside. Walker was eighteen years old and was in his second year of A-levels. He lived with his parents, Gee Walker and Steve Walker, his two sisters and one brother.

== Background ==
The Walker family were one of the first black families to live in Huyton, and the children experienced racial name-calling at both primary and secondary school. Both Walker and Taylor attended Knowsley Hey High School.

Taylor and Barton had a reputation for racially abusing others. Taylor had prior convictions for battery, and burglary, and at the time of the crime was on early release from a young offenders' centre.

== Murder ==
Anthony Walker spent the evening of 29 July 2005 at home with his girlfriend, Louise Thompson, babysitting his nephew. At 11 p.m., the couple left the house and walked to the bus stop along with Walker's cousin Marcus Binns. There, they encountered Michael Barton, aged 17, who threatened to stab Walker and Binns. As Walker, Thompson and Binns walked to another bus stop, near McGoldrick Park, Barton and his friend Paul Taylor, aged 20, followed them in a car and drove to the park, ambushing them when they reached it. Binns and Thompson managed to escape and ran away to get help, while Walker was fatally wounded when Taylor struck him in the head with an ice axe, which lodged in his skull, causing brain death. He was taken to Whiston Hospital and then to the Walton Centre, where he died at 5:25 a.m.

By the next morning, Barton and Taylor had fled to Amsterdam. When police named them as suspects, Barton's brother, footballer Joey Barton, appealed for them to return to the UK and turn themselves in. They flew back to Liverpool on the 3rd of August and were arrested and charged with Walker's murder.

== Trial ==
The trial took place between November and December 2005, and on 1 December, Taylor and Barton were convicted of the murder. Passing life sentences, with minimum terms of 23 years and eight months for Taylor, who had admitted the murder just before the trial, and 17 years and eight months for Barton, Lord Justice Leveson said that the cousins had perpetrated a "terrifying ambush" and a "racist attack of a type poisonous to any civilised society". Barton's sentence was reduced by eight months to 17 years in 2016, in recognition of improvements in his attitude and behaviour.

Barton was released from prison in September 2022 after serving 17 years.

== Aftermath ==
After the trial concluded, racist graffiti was left at the murder scene.

In April 2006, it was reported that Barton had been attacked by fellow inmates at Moorland Closed Prison near Doncaster, South Yorkshire.

Three other people were later found guilty of helping Barton and Taylor flee to the Netherlands before their eventual arrest. On 10 May 2006, Robert Williams was convicted of providing money and booking a hotel room for the pair. He was sentenced to two years and four months. Paul Morson was sentenced to 11 months in prison for providing a getaway car. Tracy Garner admitted assisting an offender and received an 11-month suspended sentence and 50 hours of community service.

Although they drew frequent comparisons, many denied that there were similarities between Walker's killing and that of Stephen Lawrence in 1993. One such critic was Labour MP Edward O'Hara, who stated that, although there was a "certain surface comparison", Walker's killing was "random, exceptional and representative of absolutely nothing".

Walker's mother explained her attitude towards her son's killers, saying "I have to forgive them. I can't feel anger and hatred, because that is what killed my son". However, Walker's girlfriend Louise, who was present on the night of his murder, said she never would forgive them adding, "I hate them for what they have done. Anthony and I shared something special. Now he has been taken away from me by those two evil young men. I still feel that he (Anthony Walker) is around. Yesterday, I sent Anthony a text and just told him he (Barton) had been found guilty. It seemed the natural thing to do."

== Reporting ==
Walker's murder and the subsequent trial of the perpetrators received a large amount of media coverage in the UK, with a media pack congregating at John Lennon Airport awaiting the return of the accused. His funeral was broadcast live on a big screen in Liverpool city centre and the BBC ran a special Real Story programme about the crime which was broadcast on 2 December 2005.

== Film adaptation ==
In 2020, Jimmy McGovern dramatised Walker's case in the TV film Anthony, with Toheeb Jimoh in the title role, looking at what Walker might have achieved had he lived. The film was made with the support of Anthony's mother Gee Walker.

== Memorials ==
On 2 April 2008, the Crown Prosecution Service announced a legal scholarship in Walker's memory. The scheme offers one place in CPS Merseyside to a trainee solicitor who wants to become a solicitor or barrister. It is open to any black or ethnic minority person who has secured or intends to apply for a place to study the Legal Practice Course or Bar Professional Training Course full-time.

The Liverpool Echo bestows an "Anthony Walker Young Citizen of the Year award" in his honour.

=== Anthony Walker Foundation ===
The Anthony Walker Foundation was created in 2006 and "works to tackle racism, hate crime and discrimination by providing educational opportunities, victim support services and by promoting equity and inclusion for all". In the year of its creation, the foundation held an "Anthony Walker Festival". In November 2021, Anthony's mother, Gee Walker, received a Pride of Britain Award for her work with the foundation, and in January 2023, it was announced she is to receive an MBE.
