= James Arderne =

Dean of Chester

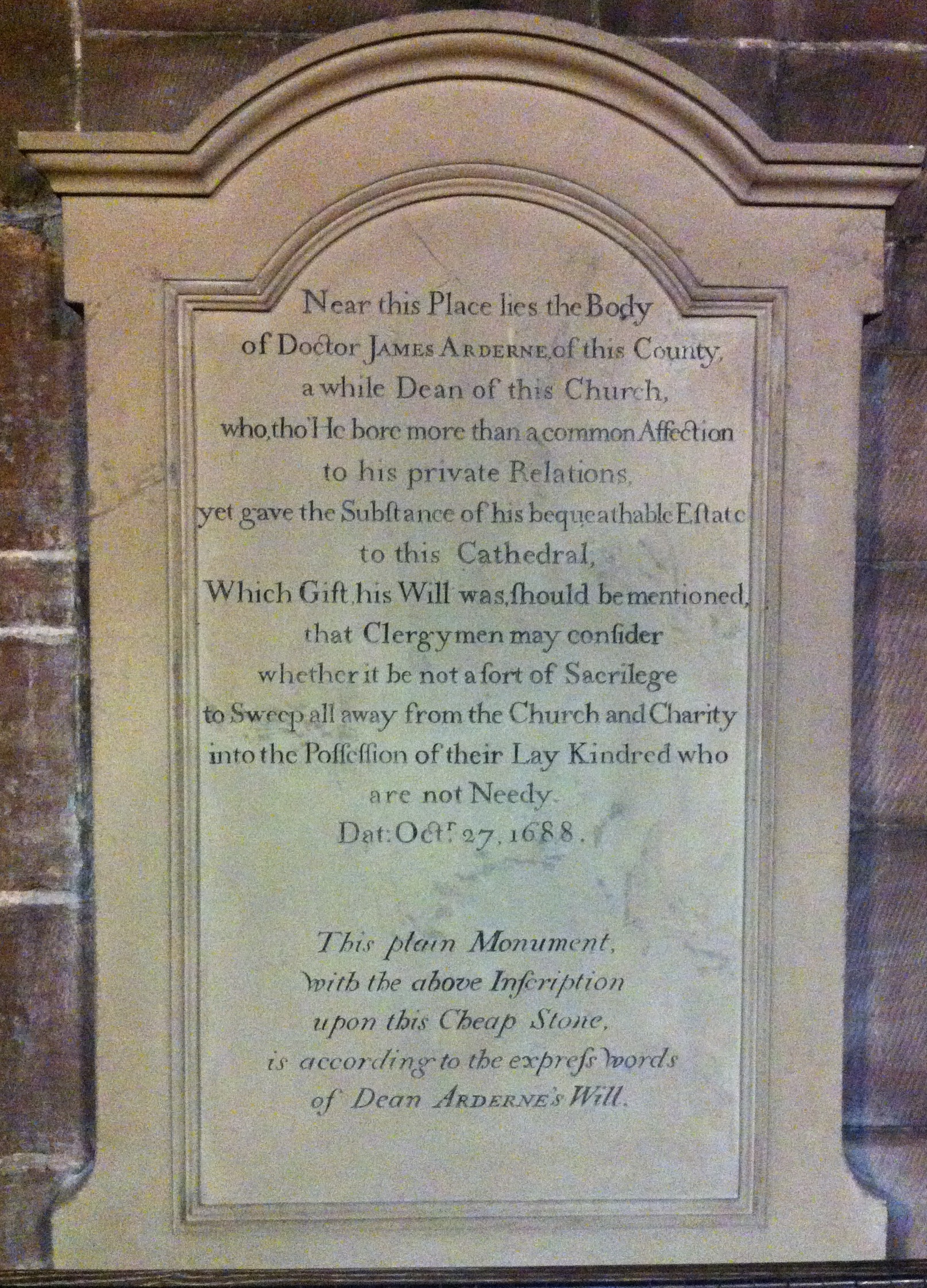
Memorial to James Arderne in Chester Cathedral

James Arderne, D.D. (1636–1691), was the dean of Chester from 1682 until his death in 1691.

== Life ==
Arderne belonged to the family of Arderne, which is one of great antiquity in Cheshire, and whose forty-five quarterings are sufficiently indicative of estate and consideration. The seat of the family was at Harden Hall, near Stockport, and at that mansion, now a ruin, James, son of Ralph Arderne of Harden, was baptised 12 October 1636. He entered Christ's College, Cambridge, 9 July 1636, but afterwards removed to St. John's, and took his B.A. in 1656, and afterwards his M.A. Two years later he was admitted Gentleman Commoner at Brasenose College, Oxford, and became M.A. in 1658.

He was apparently afterwards resident in London; for he is stated to have been a member, in 1659, of a coterie that met nightly at the Turk's Head, New Palace Yard, Westminster, under the chairmanship of James Harrington, the author of 'Oceana'. He was elected a Fellow of the Royal Society in 1668. The Restoration brought him within sight of preferment. In April 1666 he was curate of St. Botolph, Aldersgate, and held that post until 1682. Another of his preferments was Thornton-le-Moors. From the double inducement, we are told, of the public library and the society, he became a fellow-commoner of Brasenose College, Oxford, and in 1673 was admitted D.D. This degree he is also said to have had from Cambridge University. He was chaplain to Charles II, and his ministrations to that monarch procured him the rectory of Davenham in 1681 and the deanery of Chester In 1682. He is said to have had the promise of succession to the bishopric of Chester, but the events of the revolution prevented James II from giving him any further promotion.

Arderne's devotion to the Stuarts is said to have brought him affronts in his own district so vexatious as to have shortened his life. He died in 1691, but the date of his death is variously given, as 18 August, 16 September, and 18 September. He was buried in the choir of his cathedral, with a monument on which, in accordance with his will, was inscribed: "Here lies the body of Dr. James Arderne, brother of Sir John Arderne, awhile dean of this church; who, though he bore a more than common affection to his private relations, yet gave the substance of his bequeathable estate to this cathedral, which gift, his will was, should be mentioned, that clergymen may consider whether it be not a sort of sacrilege to sweep away all from the church and charity into the possession of their lay kindred who are not needy". The particular intention of Arderne in this bequest was the foundation of a public library. The property was not then large, but was increased by the reversion to the younger branch of the Ardernes of the property of Mrs. Jane Done.

George Ormerod, in printing the dean's will, observes that it is one "which the dean would certainly never have executed if he could have imagined that, from subsequent contingencies, it would have been the means of wresting from his family a very large share of one of the most ancient estates in the county, and have involved the representatives of two of his brothers in a series of law expenses, which compelled them to alienate a considerable portion of Mrs. Jane Done's bequest, the successive turns of presentation to the rectory of Tarporley". In the will he desires that the maps of Ortelius should be returned to Sir John Arderne, who had only lent the book for his lifetime. He mentions his collection of the fathers of the first three hundred years, and the common-place book which he had made from them of controversies. This he desired to be placed in the chapter-house for the use of the dean and prebendaries. A portrait of him is preserved in the deanery.

== Writings ==
- Directions concerning the Matter and Style of Sermons, written to W. S., a young deacon, by J. A., D.D., London, 1671 (B.M.)
- True Christian's Character and Crown, a sermon, London, 1671.
- A Sermon preached at the Visitation of John [Wilkins], Lord Bishop of Chester,' London, 1677 (B.M.)
- Conjectura circa Έπινομῂν D. Clementis Romani, cui subjiciuntur Castigationes in Epiphanium et Petavium de Eucharistica, de Cœlibatu Clericorum et de Orationibus pro vitâ functis. Autore Jacobo de Ardenna, 1683 (Bodleian).
- Dean of Chester's Speech to his Majesty, August the 27th 1687, London, 1687, folio, one leaf (Bodleian).
