= History of the Puritans under King James I =

Puritan Protestant history 1603–1625

The reign of King James I of England (1603–1625) saw the continued rise of the Puritan movement in England, that began during reign of Queen Elizabeth (1558–1603), and the continued clash with the authorities of the Church of England. This eventually led to the further alienation of Anglicans and Puritans from one another in the 17th century during the reign of King Charles I (1625–1649), that eventually brought about the English Civil War (1642–1651), the brief rule of the Puritan Lord Protector of England Oliver Cromwell (1653–1658), the English Commonwealth (1649–1660), and as a result the political, religious, and civil liberty that is celebrated today in all English speaking countries.

King James was brought up in Scotland under the influence of strict Scottish Calvinist tutors, like George Buchanan, who sought to instill in him a commitment to the Protestant cause in Scotland. When he became the King of both England and Scotland, James sought to keep the Church of England strictly under his monarchical rule and the power of episcopacy, previously established under Elizabeth. King James held strong convictions on the Divine right of kings, and even wrote a book on the subject. To that end, he continued to suppress many of the important aspects of the Puritan movement, including the many Puritan's Congregationalist and Presbyterian views of Church government. The King knew though that he needed the Puritans to strengthen the Protestant establishment in England, as well as every aspect of the nation's prosperity and success. To that end, King James supported and even advanced many of the Puritan pastors, academics, and gentry, just as Queen Elizabeth did, if and when they were willing to work with the Anglican establishment under the authority of the bishops. For this reason, the Puritan movement continued to grow and expand throughout England in remarkable ways under the reign of King James. To be sure the Puritan movement in England was considerably strengthened on account of the succession of the three Archbishops of Canterbury who served under King James. Archbishop John Whitgift (1583-1604), appointed by Queen Elizabeth sought to suppress the Puritan movement. Archbishop Richard Bancroft (1604–1610) chief overseer of the production of the King James Bible also sought to suppress the Puritan reform movement, but was forced to increasingly rely upon them because of the Catholic threat. Archbishop George Abbot (1611–1633) was actually often supportive of the Puritans and their designs for reform, promoting them to high ecclesiastical and academic appointments. For this reason Abbot was often spoken of at times as "the Puritan Archbishop."

One of the greatest accomplishments of Puritans and Anglicans together during the reign of King James was the translation of the King James Bible (1611); arguably one of the greatest historical, literary, and theological achievements of the western world. It was also during the reign of King James that Puritans and Anglicans worked together at the Synod of Dordt (1618–1619), an international conference of reformed theologians that drew up the Canons of Dordt in defense of the Five Points of Calvinism, refuting the Arminian heresy. It was moreover during the reign of King James that the Pilgrim movement within the reformed churches separated from the Church of England and began their colonizing venture in America known as the Plymouth Colony (1620) under the leadership of William Bradford and William Brewster. These great achievements of the Puritan movement in England under King James shows how widespread the influence of Puritanism was at this time, and how they adapted to the King's authority in different ways. Some of them sought to work within the establishment, like William Perkins, Master of Emmanuel College; while others left the Church of England and ventured elsewhere, like William Ames who spent much of his career in Holland.

The English Puritan movement that began in the reign of Elizabeth, and grew in strength and influence in England during the reign of King James sought to further the work of reforming the church of England, eradicate the influence of Roman Catholicism in the land, as well as promote the national interest of the English crown and the English people under a united Protestant confession that was in strict conformity to the Bible and Reformed theology. This Puritan vision that began in the Elizabethan era would eventually result in the Westminster Assembly, and the Westminster Standards, including Westminster Confession of Faith, the Shorter Catechism, and Larger Catechism, and the Directory for Public Worship.

Under James I of England, the Puritan movement co-existed with the conforming Church of England in what was generally an accepted form of episcopal Protestant religion. This equilibrium was disturbed towards the end of this period by several new developments, doctrinal from the Synod of Dort, political from the discussion of the Spanish Match shortly after the outbreak of the Thirty Years War, and internal to the Church with a partial shift of views away from Calvinism. Separatists who had never accepted King James's settlement of religious affairs began migrating to New England colonies, from the Netherlands as well as England.

== The Millenary Petition (1603) and the Hampton Court Conference (1604) ==
Elizabeth I died in March 1603; she was succeeded by James VI of Scotland, who had been King of Scots since the abdication of his mother, Mary, Queen of Scots, in 1567 (when James was 1 year old). James had little contact with his mother and was raised by guardians in the Presbyterian Church of Scotland. John Knox had led the Scottish Reformation, beginning in 1560, and the Church of Scotland looked broadly like the type of church that the Puritans wanted in England. In his 1599 book Basilikon Doron, the king had had harsh words for Puritans, but his criticisms seemed directed at the most extreme of the Puritans and it seemed likely that the king would agree to moderate reforms.

Throughout 1603, Puritan ministers collected signatures for a petition, known as the Millenary Petition because it was signed by 1,000 Puritan ministers. The Petition was careful not to challenge the royal supremacy in the Church of England, and called for a number of church reforms to remove ceremonies perceived as popish: The Millenary Petition was presented to James in Leicester so he couldn't discuss the terms with the Bishops.

1. The use of the sign of the cross in baptism (which Puritans saw as superstitious);
2. The rite of confirmation (which Puritans criticized because it was not found in the Bible);
3. The performance of baptism by midwives (which Puritans argued was based on a superstitious belief that infants who died without being baptized could not go to heaven);
4. The exchanging of rings during the marriage ceremony (again seen as unscriptural and superstitious);
5. The ceremonious bowing at the Name of Jesus during worship (again seen as superstitious);
6. The requirement that clergy wear surplice as it wasn't mentioned in the Bible; and
7. The custom of clergy living in the church building.

The Petition argued that a preaching minister should be appointed to every parish (instead of one who simply read the service from the Book of Common Prayer). In opposition to Archbishop John Whitgift's policy that clergy must subscribe to the Book of Common Prayer and the use of vestments, the Petition argued that ministers should only be required to subscribe to the Thirty-Nine Articles and the royal supremacy. Finally, the Petition called for the ending of episcopacy, and the setting up of a presbyterian system of church governance.

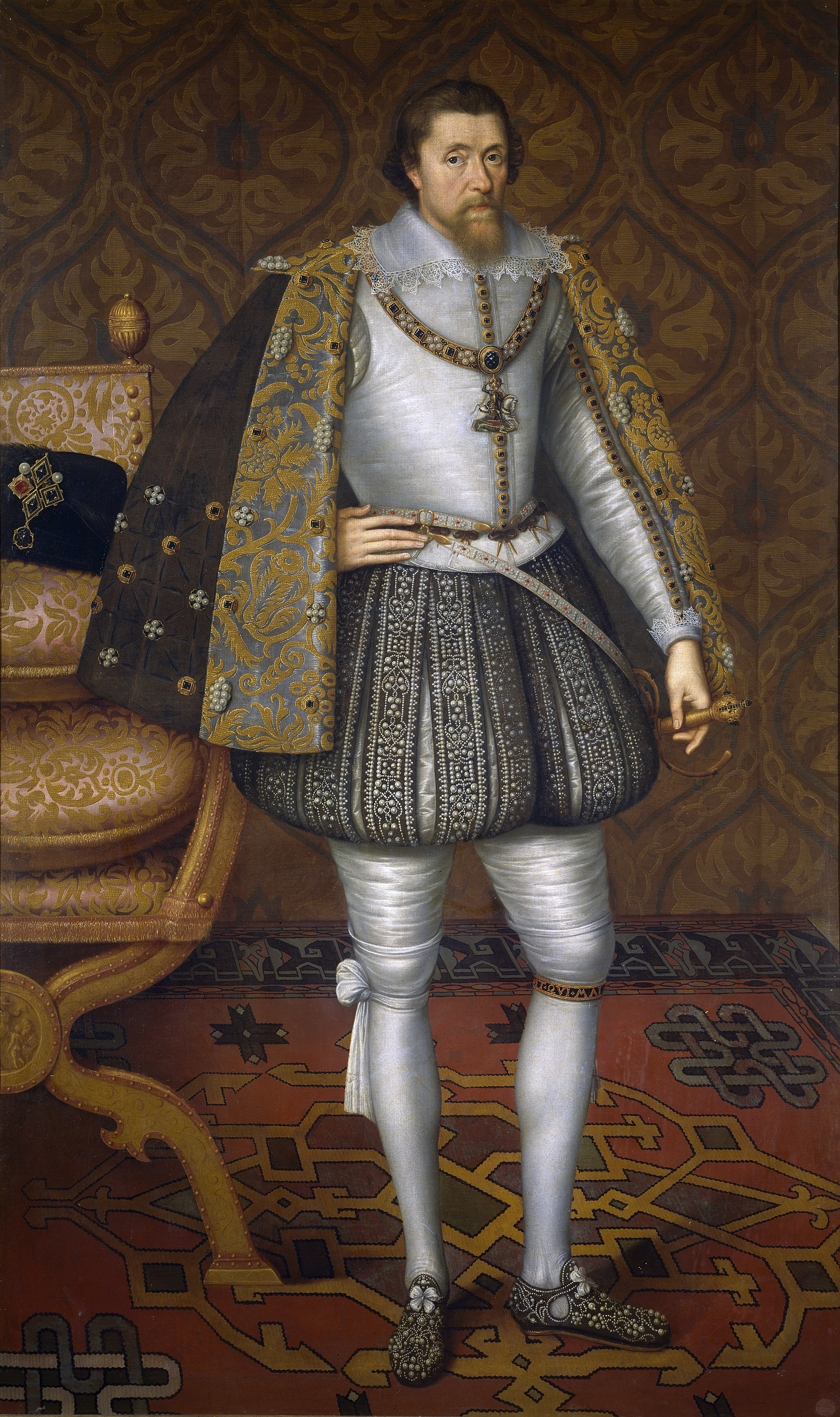
King James (1566–1625) disappointed the Puritans by agreeing to only modest reform proposals at the 1604 Hampton Court Conference.

James I, who had studied theology, and who enjoyed debating theological points, agreed to hold a conference at Hampton Court Palace, where supporters and opponents of the Millenary Petition could debate the merits of reforms to the church. After being postponed due to an outbreak of the plague, the Hampton Court Conference was held in January 1604. The king chose four Puritans to represent the Puritan cause: John Rainolds (president of Corpus Christi College, Oxford), Laurence Chaderton (master of Emmanuel College, Cambridge), Thomas Sparke, and John Knewstubs. Archbishop Whitgift led a delegation of eight bishops (including Whitgift's protégé, Richard Bancroft, Bishop of London), seven deans, and two other clergymen in opposition to the Puritans.

At the first meeting of the Conference, held January 14, James met only with Archbishop Whitgift's party. On the second day, January 16, he met with the Puritans - this day of the conference ended badly for the Puritans when Rainolds mentioned the Puritan proposal for creating presbyteries in England. James viewed the proposal to replace bishops with presbyteries as an attempt to diminish his power in the church. As such, James issued his famous maxim "No bishop, no king!" on this occasion, before ending the day's meeting early. On January 18, the king initially met with Whitgift's party and an assemblage of ecclesiastical lawyers, before calling in the Puritans to hear his verdict. James declared that the use of the Book of Common Prayer was to continue, and made no provisions for a preaching ministry. He did, however, approve a few changes in the Book of Common Prayer: 1) the mention of baptism by midwives was to be eliminated; 2) the term "absolution" (which Puritans associated with the Catholic sacrament of penance, which was rejected by Protestants) was replaced by the term "remission of sins"; 3) confirmation was renamed "laying on of hands" to dissociate it from its Catholic sacramental meaning; and 4) a few other minor changes. James also announced that he agreed to support the Puritan project for a new, authorized translation of the Bible, thus setting the stage for the production of the Authorized King James Version of the Bible, published in 1611.

== Richard Bancroft, Archbishop of Canterbury, 1604–1610 ==
Following the death of John Whitgift, James selected Richard Bancroft as his replacement as Archbishop of Canterbury. Bancroft had argued against the Puritans at the Hampton Court Conference, and his selection signalled the end to reforms. Shortly after his selection, Bancroft presented a book of canons to the Convocation of the English Clergy; these canons received royal approval and as such became part of the Church of England's canon law. The Parliament of England, which in 1559 had passed the Act of Uniformity approving the Book of Common Prayer, claimed that Parliament, not Convocation, was the body authorized to pass new canon law. Puritans argued that the bishops were attempting to aggrandize themselves at the Parliament's expense. In the end, James acceded to Parliament's demand, and withdrew the book of canons. The 1604 parliament marks the first time that the Puritans had allied themselves with the cause of Parliament over against the cause of the bishops. Over the next several decades, this alliance would become one of the most pronounced features of English politics, and would form the basis of the divisions in the English Civil War in the 1640s.

The discovery of the Gunpowder Plot led to a period of particularly virulent anti-Catholicism. Since the Puritans were the hawks against Catholics, they enjoyed some cachet in this period. Nevertheless, their reform proposals were successfully blocked by Bancroft.

== George Abbot, Archbishop of Canterbury, 1611-1633 ==
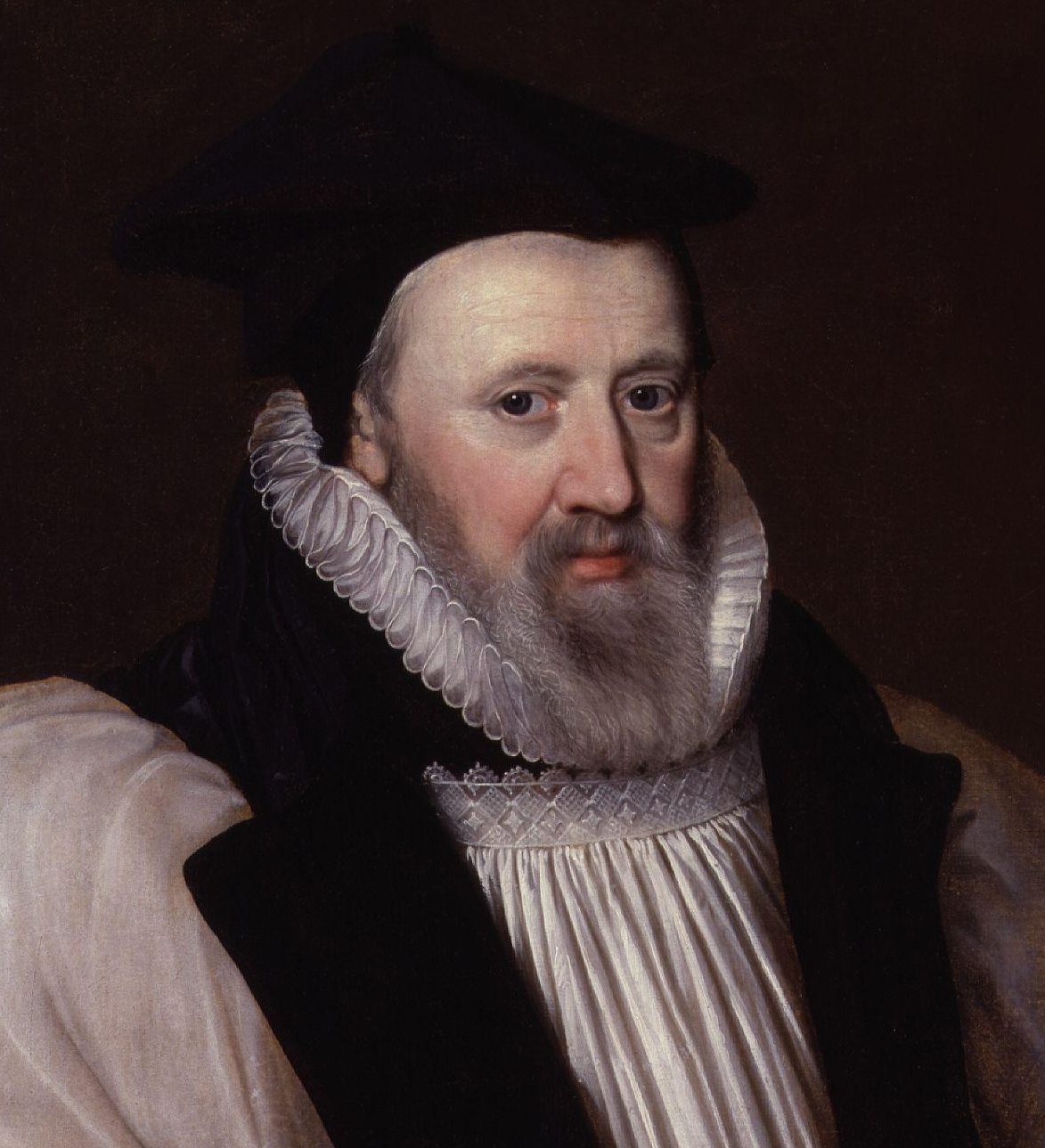
George Abbot (1562–1633), Archbishop of Canterbury, whom some historians have called "the Puritan Archbishop."

Following Archbishop Bancroft's death in 1610, James chose George Abbot as his successor. James re-introduced bishops (abolished at the time of the Scottish Reformation) into the Church of Scotland, though with less power than bishops elsewhere, and serving essentially as the permanent chairman of a presbytery. In 1608, Abbot had impressed James after he accompanied George Home, 1st Earl of Dunbar to Scotland as part of his efforts to unify the English and Scottish churches, and James had named Abbot Bishop of Lichfield in 1609. James intended Abbot's appointment as Archbishop of Canterbury to further his project of unifying the English and Scottish churches.

While each Archbishop of Canterbury since Matthew Parker had been a Calvinist, Abbot is generally regarded as "The Calvinist Archbishop" or even as "The Puritan Archbishop", and is the closest the Puritans ever got to seeing an Archbishop of Canterbury endorse their proposals. (The one issue on which Abbot was distinctly non-Puritan was the issue of episcopacy – Abbot was one of the most vocal proponents of the doctrine of apostolic succession in the Church of England.)

=== The King James or Authorized Version of the Bible, 1611 ===
In 1611 the King James or Authorized version of the English Bible, begun in 1604, was published. It was essentially an official Anglican work, but there were many Puritans who contributed to the translation. It was first printed by Robert Barker, the King's Printer, and was the third translation into English approved by the English Church authorities: The first had been the Great Bible, commissioned in the reign of King Henry VIII (1535), and the second had been the Bishops' Bible, commissioned in the reign of Queen Elizabeth I (1568). In January 1604, King James I convened the Hampton Court Conference, where a new English version was conceived in response to the problems of the earlier translations perceived by the Puritans, who preferred the Geneva Bible. The King James version slowly took over the place of the Geneva Bible had among the Puritans. The KJV of the Bible translation is noted for its "majesty of style", and has been described as one of the most important books in English culture and a driving force in the shaping of the English-speaking world.

=== The Book of Sports Controversy, 1617 ===
It had long been a custom in England that Sunday mornings were dedicated to Christian worship, and were then followed by sports and games on Sunday afternoons. The Puritans loudly objected to the practice of Sunday sports, believing that playing games on Sabbath constituted a violation of the Fourth Commandment. Their Sabbatarian views became much stronger than in other European Reformed churches.

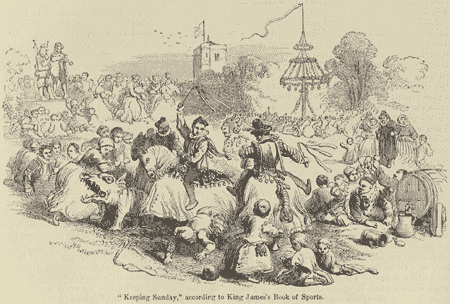
Nineteenth-century illustration showing parishioners "keeping Sunday" in a way approved by the Book of Sports. Although the Puritans did not necessarily object to these sports and games in general, they did object to allowing them on Sundays.

In the early seventeenth century, Puritans came to dominate several localities and managed to succeed in banning Sunday sports. In 1617, in Lancashire, there was a particularly intense quarrel between the Puritans and the local gentry (many of whom were Catholic recusants) over the issue of Sunday sports. In response to the controversy raging in his diocese, Thomas Morton, Bishop of Chester, asked the king for a ruling on the propriety of Sunday sports.

In response King James issued the Book of Sports, a declaration declaring that it was lawful to play some sports on Sundays, but not others. Criticizing the opinions of "puritans and precise people", the Book listed archery, dancing, "leaping, vaulting, or any other such harmless recreation" as permissible sports for Sundays. It forbade bear-baiting, bull-baiting, "interludes" and bowling. The king commanded all Anglican ministers to read the Book of Sports to their congregations, but Archbishop Abbot contradicted him, and ordered his clergy not to read the Book of Sports.

=== The Five Articles of Perth, 1618 ===
In 1618, King James proposed the Five Articles of Perth, which imposed English practices on the Scottish church. The Five Articles required:

1. kneeling at Communion;
2. provisions allowing for private baptism;
3. provisions allowing reservation of the sacrament for the ill;
4. only a bishop was allowed to administer the rite of confirmation; and
5. the Church of Scotland, which had previously abolished all holy days, was obliged to accept some holy days.

The Five Articles of Perth were ultimately accepted by the General Assembly of the Church of Scotland, though a sizable minority of Scottish Presbyterians objected. The Articles of Perth appeared to English Puritans to be heading in the wrong direction.

=== The Pilgrims and the Planting of Plymouth Colony, 1620 ===
In 1620, a group of Puritan separatists, known today as the Pilgrims, made their famous sea voyage on the Mayflower across the Atlantic to settle Plymouth Colony. They were led by governor William Bradford and church elder William Brewster. The Pilgrims were originally a part of the Puritan separatist movement in England. They began to feel the pressures of religious persecution while still in the English village of Scrooby, near East Retford, Nottinghamshire. In 1607, Archbishop Tobias Matthew raided homes and imprisoned several members of the congregation. The congregation therefore left England in 1609 and emigrated to the Netherlands, settling first in Amsterdam and then in Leiden. In Leiden, the congregation gained the freedom to worship as they chose, but Dutch society was unfamiliar to them. And so they made preparations to settle a new colony in America. The first settlement of the Plymouth Colony was at New Plymouth, a location previously surveyed and named by Captain John Smith. The settlement served as the capital of the colony and developed as the modern town of Plymouth, Massachusetts. At its height, Plymouth Colony occupied most of the southeastern portion of the modern state of Massachusetts. It was one of the earliest successful colonies to be founded by the English in North America, along with Jamestown and other settlements in Virginia, and was the first sizable permanent English settlement in the New England region. The colony was able to establish a treaty with Chief Massasoit which helped to ensure its success; in this, they were aided by Squanto, a member of the Patuxet tribe. By 1691 Plymouth Colony and the Pilgrim colonists, eventually merged with the Puritan Massachusetts Bay Colony under John Winthrop (established in 1628), and other territories to form the Province of Massachusetts Bay.

=== The Thirty Years War and the Controversy over the Spanish Match, 1623-1624 ===
King James saw himself as the potential peacemaker of Europe, and his propaganda portrayed him as the modern Solomon. In religion the Church of England could provide a model middle ground, and in his view both Catholics and Protestants would be able to accept churches modeled after it.

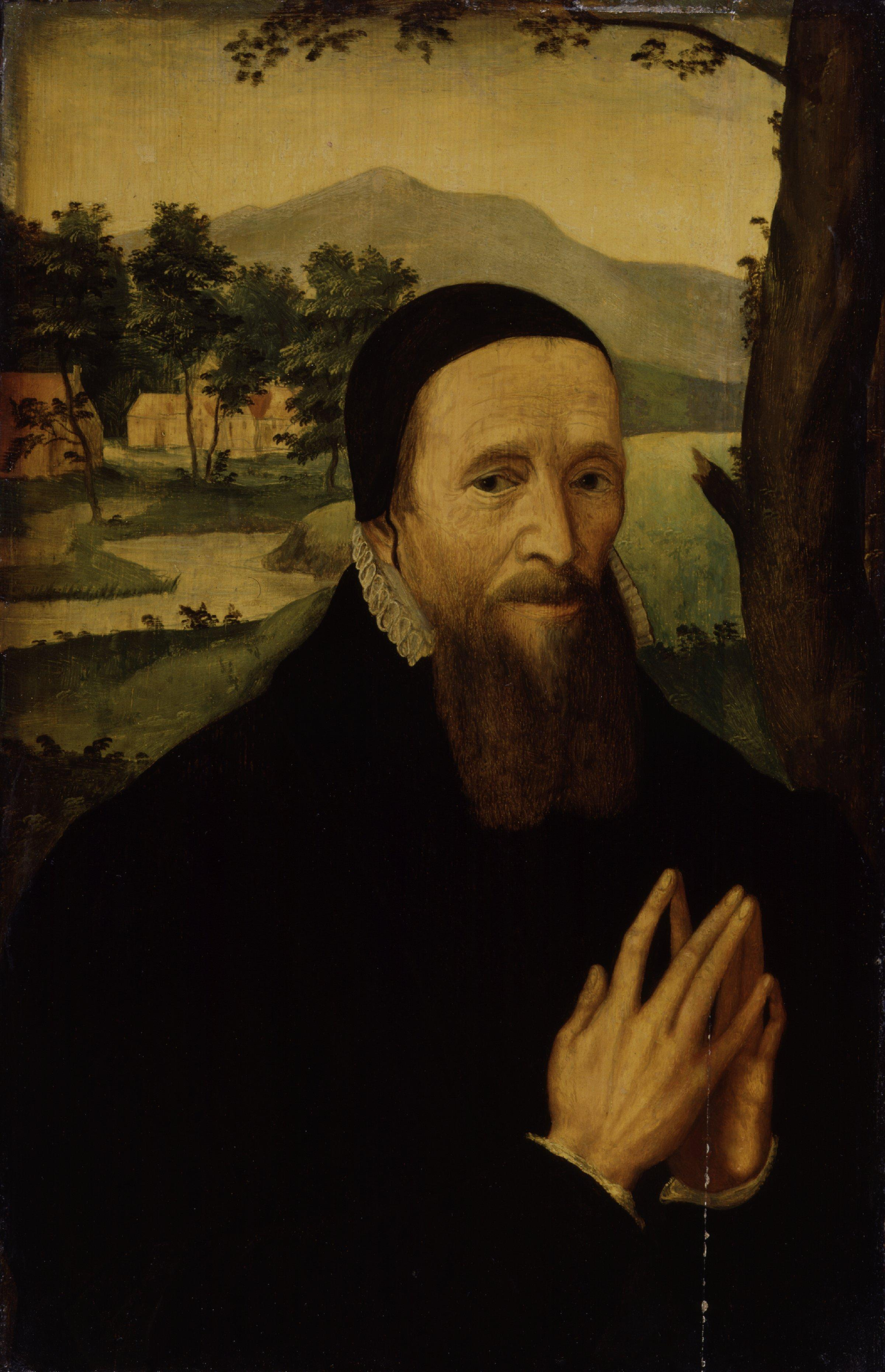
Richard Hooker (1554–1600) opposed the Puritans' efforts to further reform the Church of England. King James, who saw himself as the Peacemaker of Europe, agreed with Hooker, and promoted a middle ground between Catholicism and Protestantism as the solution to Europe's problems.

In this regard, he subscribed to the theory that the Church of England represented a via media or middle way between Protestantism and Catholicism. When his son Charles became old enough to marry, James mused about marrying Charles to a Catholic princess. The Thirty Years' War broke out in 1618, and English Protestants demanded that James intervene, on behalf of his son-in-law Frederick V, Elector Palatine. James initially refused, but in 1620 was forced to call a parliament to raise funds to support an expedition on behalf of Frederick: this was the first parliament James had called since the 1614 Addled Parliament. Parliament led by Edward Coke refused to grant adequate funds for this expedition unless the king agreed that his son would marry a Protestant. James responded that Parliament had no business interfering in matters of royal prerogative. Parliament responded by passing a protest, asserting its ancient rights. At the urging of his favourite, George Villiers, 1st Duke of Buckingham, and of the Spanish ambassador Diego Sarmiento de Acuña, 1st Count of Gondomar, James tore this protest out of the record book and dissolved Parliament.

Buckingham had gained considerable influence, not only over James, but also over Prince Charles. In 1623, he convinced the 23-year-old Charles that England should ally with Spain and that Prince Charles should marry a Spanish princess. The two thus sailed for Spain so that Charles could court Maria Anna of Spain, daughter of Philip III of Spain. This proposed marriage is known to history as the Spanish Match. The Spanish Match was wildly unpopular among English Protestants, and allowed Puritan conspiracy theories a great deal of credibility: Puritans argued that the Spanish Match was part of a plot to restore England to Catholicism. When James called another parliament in 1623, the anti-Catholic outpouring was so virulent that it was obvious the parliament would agree to none of the king's requests. Meanwhile, in Spain, the Spanish insisted that they would only agree to the Spanish Match if Charles agreed to convert to Catholicism and agree to spend a year receiving Catholic instruction in Spain. Under the circumstances, Charles ultimately declined the Spanish Match in 1624. His return to England was greeted with widespread celebrations and treated as a national holiday.

In response to his rebuff by Spain, Charles came to favour alliance with France and war with Spain. At the Puritan-dominated 1624 parliament, the parliament impeached Lionel Cranfield, 1st Earl of Middlesex, the minister most associated with advocacy in favour of the Spanish Match. The parliament agreed to fund a war with Spain in principle, though they did not actually allocate funding for the war.

=== The rise of the Arminian party and the New Gagg controversy (1624) ===
King James was a lifelong doctrinal Calvinist, and when the Quinquarticular Controversy broke out in the Dutch Republic in the years following the death of theologian Jacobus Arminius in 1609, James supported the Calvinist Gomarists against the Arminian Remonstrants. James handpicked British delegates sent to the 1618 Synod of Dort and concurred in the outcome of the Synod. But James was increasingly faced with Puritan opposition (over the Book of Sports, the Five Articles of Perth, the Spanish Match, etc.), he began to seek out clerics who would be more supportive of his ecumenical ecclesiastical plans. Since the reign of Elizabeth, England had contained a number of theologians who opposed the extreme predestinarian views in the high Calvinism propounded by Theodore Beza and accepted by the Puritans. For example, Peter Baro, the Lady Margaret's Professor of Divinity at the University of Cambridge, had opposed Archbishop Whitgift's attempts to impose the Calvinistic Lambeth Articles on the Church of England in 1595. Several of Baro's disciples at Cambridge – notably Lancelot Andrewes, John Overall, and Samuel Harsnett – had repeated Baro's criticisms of predestination in terms roughly equivalent to those propounded by Arminius. When James was looking for anti-Puritan allies, he found this party willing, and, although few members of this party actually accepted the Arminian position tout court, they were quickly labeled "the Arminian party" by the Puritans.

In 1624, when a hitherto obscure Cambridge scholar, Richard Montagu, obtained royal permission to publish A New Gagg for an Old Goose. The book was framed as a rebuttal of a Catholic critique of the Church of England. In response, Montagu argued that the Calvinist positions objected to were held only by a small, Puritan minority in the Church of England, and that the majority of clergy in the Church of England rejected high Calvinism. A New Gagg was of major importance in the history of the Puritans, in that it marked the first time they had ever been associated with a doctrinal position (as opposed to a question of proper practice). For example, George Carleton, Bishop of Chichester, who had been an English delegate at the Synod of Dort, was shocked to find his doctrinal position being equated with Puritanism.

By the end of the reign of King James in 1625, Puritanism had established itself in England as a revolutionary religious and political movement. The Puritans had come to influence every institution of English society and had spread as well to the continent in Holland as well as the American colonies in the Plymouth Colony. The Puritans had moreover come to control most of the English Parliament. The Puritan movement would grow even stronger under King Charles I, and even for a time come to take control of England with the English Commonwealth and the Protectorate of Oliver Cromwell, following the English Civil War. But it was certainly under the rule of King James (1604–1625) where the Puritan movement found great momentum.

== Notable Puritan ministers ==
The Puritan ministers and theologians during the reign of King James that contributed to the further development of the Puritan movement in England were many. The most outstanding contributors include:

- Thomas Cartwright (1535–1603) preacher, scholar, and controversialist, considered the patriarch of the Presbyterian movement within Puritanism. He was known for his disputations and letters as well as his brief "Commentary on Paul's Letter to the Colossians."
- Laurence Chaderton (1536–1640) the first Master of Emmanuel College, Cambridge; and one of the translators of the King James Version of the Bible. Chaderton lived over 100 years, and was known as the great patriarch of the Puritan movement.
- William Perkins (1558–1602) Master of Emmanuel College, Cambridge, who was the most prolific Puritan theologian and expositor of Scripture during the Elizabethan era. Perkins is best known for his "Golden Chain of Theology" and his great "Commentary on Paul's letter to the Galatians." His influence on the Puritan movement was monumental.
- Richard Rogers (1550–1618) fellow of Emmanuel College, Cambridge known for his strong Biblical preaching, whose "Seven Treatises" on the Christian Life were foundational to the Puritan movement.
- John Knewstub (1544–1624) preacher and scholar who was a participant in the Hampton Court Conference of 1604 representing the Puritan side. He was a Presbyterian by conviction, but moderate in his Puritan views.
- Arthur Hildersham (1563–1632) was one of the promoters of the Millenary Petition, with Stephen Egerton presented to James I in 1603 who was also known as a strong nonconformist preacher.
- Andrew Melville (1545–1622) was a Scottish scholar, theologian and religious reformer following John Knox, whose fame encouraged scholars from the European continent to study in Scotland at Glasgow and St. Andrews.
- John Dod (1549–1645) a great nonconformist preacher and expositor of Scripture known for his, "Exposition of the Ten Commandments," which gave him the nickname of Decalogue Dod.
- George Abbot (1562–1633) was the Anglican Archbishop of Canterbury from 1611 to 1633, often considered the Puritan protector for his partiality toward the Puritan movement. Abbot was also a translator of the King James Bible.
- John Rogers (1570–1636) sometimes referred to as "Roaring" John Rogers, was a nonconformist known for his fiery preaching style.
- John Rainolds (1549–1607) one of the leading Puritan scholars of the King James era had a share in the Hampton Court Conference, where he was the most prominent representative of the Puritan party and received a good deal of favor from the king. He was also a leading contributor to the King James Version of the Bible,
- Paul Baynes (1573–1616) was a fiery Puritan best known for his exposition of Ephesians and his friendship with William Perkins.
- Stephen Egerton (1555–1621) was one of those chosen to present the Millenary petition to King James in 1603 to promote reformation in the Church of England.
- Henry Ainsworth (1571–1622) was one of the greatest Old Testament scholars of the period, and also known as an avowed congregationalist. He is best known for his "Annotations on the Pentateuch."
- Henry Airay (1560–1616) a moderate Puritan in his views known for his preaching and his commentary on Paul's letter to the Philippians.
- Robert Parker (1564–1614) a separatist Puritan who was considered by Cotton Mather as one of the greatest scholars and theologians of the period. He left England to minister in Holland as a result of persecution.
- Nicholas Byfield (1579–1622) a leading preacher and promoter of the Sabbath among the Puritans. He is best known for his Commentary on Paul's letter to the Colossians.
- William Pemble (1591–1623) was a leading Puritan scholar and theologian in the schools. He was a reader and tutor at Magdalene College.
- John Robinson (1575–1625) was the pastor of the "Pilgrims" of Plymouth colony before they left on the Mayflower. He became one of the early leaders of the English Separatists and is regarded (along with Robert Browne) as one of the founders of the Congregationalist form of church government.
- John Preston (1587–1628) Master of Emmanuel College after Laurence Chaderton was considered one of the godliest Christ-centered preachers of the era, and also known for his numerous devotional books, including "The Breastplate of Faith and Love."
- Robert Bolton (1572–1631) a famous preacher and scholar, also known for his many pastoral and devotional works. He is b est known for his work, "Directions for a Comfortable Walk with God."
- William Ames (1576–1633) a strict and fiery Puritan who studied under William Perkins and considered one the greatest theologians of the era on account of his greatest work, "The Marrow of Sacred Divinity." Ames was a congregationalist who migrated to Holland on account of persecution and was associated with the Pilgrims of the Plymouth colony.
- Richard Sibbes (1577–1633) a moderate Puritan who stayed in the Church of England was famous and beloved for his sweet and endearing style of devotional preaching and Biblical exposition. He is best known for his devotional book, "The Bruised Reed."
- Thomas Taylor (1576–1633) a powerful preacher known for his godly leadership in the Puritan movement and his many sermons and treatises. His exposition of Paul's letter to Titus is one of his greatest works.
- Samuel Ward (1577–1648) Master at Emmanuel College, Cambridge and student of William Perkins. He served as one of the delegates from the Church of England to the Synod of Dort.
- Richard Bernard (1568–1641) a moderate Puritan known for his influential handbook for ministers entitled "The Faithful Shepherd." His most popular book was "The Isle of Man" an allegory that greatly influenced John Bunyan and his writing of his famous masterpiece "Pilgrim's Progress."
- Henry Jacob (1563–1624) a separatist Puritan associated with the Brownists and the congregationalist movement. He became a friend and associate of John Robinson, pastor to the Pilgrims.
- John Downame (1572–1652) a preacher and theologian in London, who came to prominence in the 1640s, when he worked closely with the Westminster Assembly. He is now remembered for his many devotional and theological writings, including "A Sum of Sacred Divinity" and "A Guide to Godliness."
- John Davenant (1572–1641) famous Anglican scholar and moderate Calvinist theologian who was made bishop of Salisbury in 1621. He also served as one of the British delegates to the Synod of Dort. Davenant, though not often considered a Puritan, had a significant influence on the Puritan movement because of his scholarship and irenic attitude toward the Puritans. He is best known for his extensive "Commentary on Paul's Letter to the Colossians," and his "Dissertation on the Death of Christ," which he argues for the universal sufficiency of Christ's atonement for all: "Christ died sufficiently for all men, and effectually for His elect."
- John White (1575–1648) preacher and scholar who was chosen for the Westminster Assembly. He was instrumental in obtaining charters for the New England Company, and the Massachusetts Bay Company, Puritan colonizing efforts that led to the Massachusetts Bay Colony.
- Daniel Rogers (1573–1652) student of William Perkins best known for his practical and devotional preaching, and his book called, "Matrimonial Honor."
- William Gouge (1575–1653) famous preacher and theologian who was a member of the Westminster Assembly. He is known for his many books, including "Domestical Duties," and his massive "Commentary on Hebrews."
- Richard Stock (1569–1626) one of the Puritan founders of the Feoffees for Impropriations, and was the pastor and tutor to the great Puritan poet John Milton.
- Thomas Gataker (1574–1654) a scholar and theologian who was a member of the Westminster Assembly as well as a friend of Richard Stock.

== General references ==
- Spurr, John (1998). English Puritanism, 1603-1689. New York: St. Martin's Press. ISBN 0-312-21426-X.
- Webster, Tom (2008). "Early Stuart Puritanism". In Coffey, John; Lim, Paul C. H. (eds.). The Cambridge Companion to Puritanism. Cambridge University Press. pp. 48–66. doi:10.1017/CCOL9780521860888.004. ISBN 978-0-521-86088-8.
