= James VI and I and religious issues =

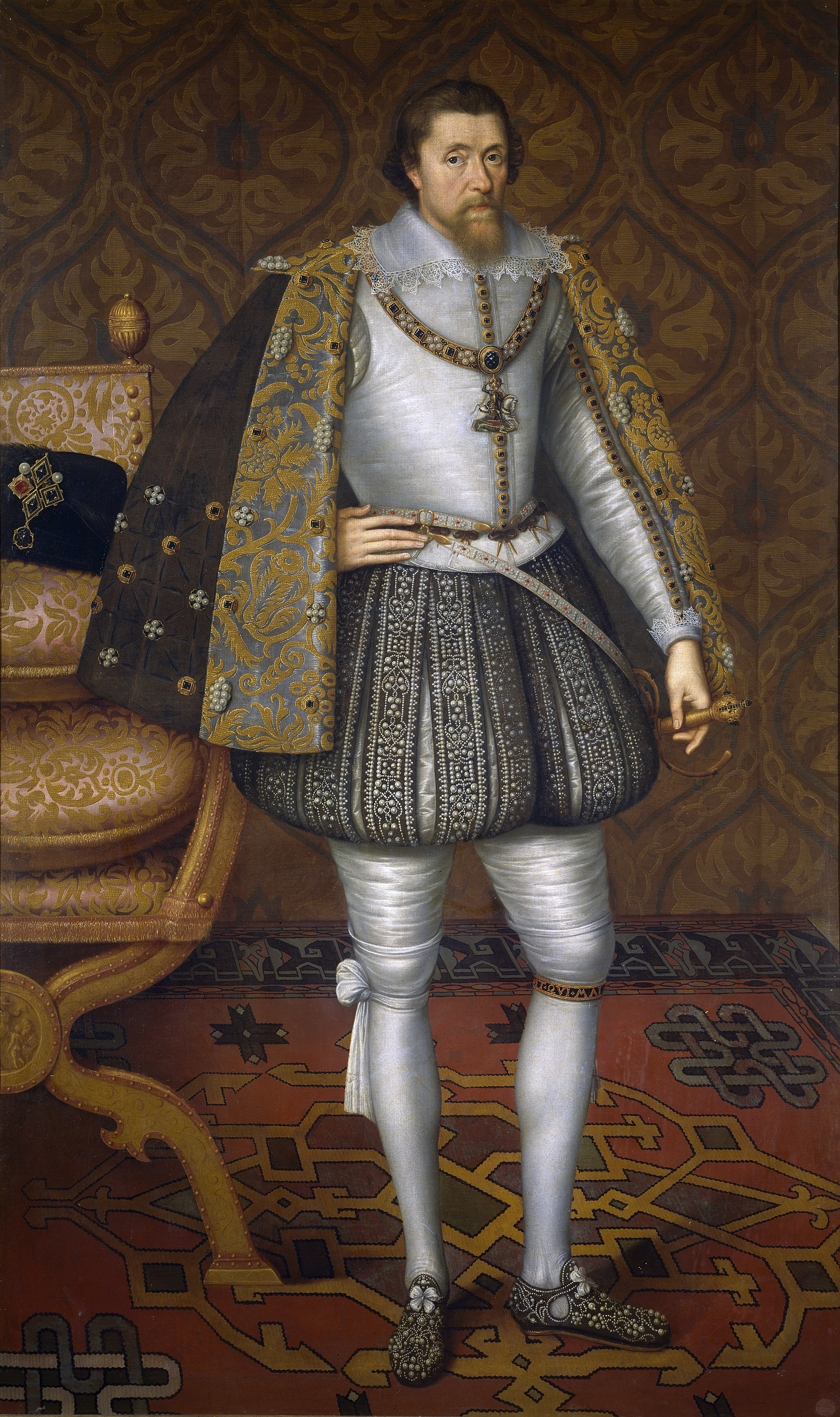
James VI and I was baptised Roman Catholic, but brought up Presbyterian and leaned Anglican during his rule. He was a lifelong Protestant, but had to cope with issues surrounding the many religious views of his era, including Anglicanism, Presbyterianism, Roman Catholicism and differing opinions of several English Separatists.

James VI and I (James Stuart) (19 June 1566 – 27 March 1625), King of Scotland, England and Ireland, faced many complicated religious challenges during his reigns in Scotland and England.

In Scotland, he inherited a reformed church, the Kirk, which was attempting to rid the country of bishops, dioceses, and parishes and establish a fully Presbyterian system, run by ministers and elders. However, James saw the bishops as the natural allies of the monarchy and frequently came into conflict with the Kirk in his sustained effort to reintroduce an episcopal polity to Scotland.

On his succession to the English throne in 1603, James was impressed by the church system he found there, which still adhered to an episcopate and supported the monarch's position as the head of the church. On the other hand, there were many more Roman Catholics in England than in Scotland, and James inherited a set of penal laws which he was constantly exhorted to enforce against them. Before ascending the English throne, James had assured the Earl of Northumberland that he would not persecute "any that will be quiet and give but an outward obedience to the law," but he soon reinforced strict penalties against Catholics. Partly triggered by Catholics' disillusionment with the new king, the Gunpowder Plot of 1605 led to a new wave of anti-Catholicism and even harsher legislation. In 1606, an oath of allegiance was introduced, though its enforcement later slackened. His policy of seeking a Spanish Match for his son, Charles, Prince of Wales, produced widespread opposition, particularly in the Commons, where members feared a revival of Catholic power in the country and a threat to the Protestant monarchy and state.

== Puritans and other Dissenters ==
James had been raised in a Calvinist environment and in 1590 while in Scotland he had criticised the Communion service in the Book of Common Prayer as an "evil said masse in English".

On James's arrival in London, the Puritan clergy presented him with the Millenary Petition, allegedly signed by a thousand English clergy, requesting reforms in the church, particularly the abolition of confirmation, wedding rings, and the term "priest", and that the wearing of cap and surplice, which they regarded as "outward badges of Popish errours", be made optional. James, however, equated English Puritans with Scottish Presbyterians and, after banning religious petitions, told the Hampton Court Conference of 1604 that he preferred the status quo, with the monarch ruling the church through the bishops. He therefore resolved to enforce conformity among the clergy, a decision which led in the short term to about ninety ejections or suspensions from livings and in the longer term to a sense of persecution among English Puritans. A notable success of the Hampton Court Conference was the commissioning of a new translation of the Bible, completed in 1611, which became known as the King James Bible, considered a masterpiece of Jacobean prose. However, the same conference resulted in the 1604 Book of Common Prayer that, despite making some concessions to Puritans, was poorly received by Dissenters.

James, who took an interest in the scholarly decisions of the translators, often participated in theological debate. In 1612, for example, he wrote a tract against the unorthodox Dutch theologian Conrad Vorstius, a follower of Jacobus Arminius. A year before, he had imprisoned a dissenter called Bartholomew Legate, with whom he had frequent audience during the protracted court proceedings. According to a court official, on hearing that Legate had not prayed to Christ in seven years, the king in choler spurn'd at him with his foot; Away, base fellow (saith he), it shall never be said that one stayeth in my presence, that hath never prayed to our Saviour for seven years together.' In 1612, Legate was convicted of blasphemous heresy and was burned at the stake, along with Edward Wightman. Another dissenter, the General Baptist leader Thomas Helwys, appealed to James for liberty of conscience, only to be sent to prison, where he died by 1616.

== Catholics ==
After the Gunpowder Plot in November 1605, the third Catholic conspiracy against his person in three years, James sanctioned stricter measures to suppress them. In May 1606, Parliament passed an act which could require any citizen to take an Oath of Allegiance, entailing a denial of the pope's authority over the king. James believed that the Oath was merely concerned with civil obedience, a secular transaction between king and subject; but it provoked opposition among Catholics, as it did not explicitly restrict itself to political matters. In early 1606, the Venetian ambassador reported James as saying: "I do not know upon what they found this cursed doctrine that they are permitted to plot against the lives of princes". James's policy aimed at punishing a few instead of creating bloodshed; Jesuits and seminary priests should simply be asked to leave the country. James proved lenient towards Catholic laymen who took the Oath of Allegiance, and tolerated crypto-Catholicism even at court. Henry Howard, for example, outwardly professed Protestantism but remained a Catholic in private and was received back into the Roman church in his final months.

== Anti-Puritans ==
There was a polarisation in the Church of England that had been fomenting since the reign of Elizabeth I. That conflict emerged between more extremist Puritans and those who opposed their theology and liturgical style. Historians of the Jacobean era have debated about what to call this group. The broad consensus is to call them proto-Arminians, as specifically anti-Calvinist literature was censored until 1624, and Arminianism (if it existed at all in England) certainly had no supporters on paper until this year. This group of divines centred around figures such as Lancelot Andrewes, Thomas Dove, John Overall and William Laud, who positioned themselves contrary to the Calvinist theology of the Puritans. Such was the case during The Gagg controversy, in which the cleric Richard Montagu published a pamphlet in which he attacked high Calvinism and its claims to have many footholds within the doctrine of the Church of England. James I began to inflame tensions with Puritans later on in his reign by the promotion of anti-Calvinist churchmen, such as William Laud to the role of the Bishop of St Davids in 1621. Many of the problems that would soon emerge in terms of religious divisions and conflicts between these anti-Puritans (later known as Laudians) and Puritan Calvinists under James' successor to the English throne, Charles I of England.

== Scottish church ==
In Basilikon Doron, James called the Scottish Reformation, which promoted a Presbyterian polity and had been initiated by a combination of magnates, lairds, and burgesses in the Parliament of Scotland against the wishes of the Crown, "inordinate" and "not proceeding from the prince's order". He therefore attempted to bring the Scottish Kirk "so neir as can be" to the English church and reestablish the episcopacy in Scotland, a policy which met with opposition from the Scottish Parliament and General Assembly. In 1610, the boundaries of pre-Reformation dioceses were re-established, and in 1618, James's bishops forced his Five Articles of Perth through a General Assembly; but they were widely resented and resisted. James was to leave the church in Scotland divided at his death, creating outstanding problems for his son; indeed, it was a crisis over episcopacy in the Kirk that proximately caused the civil wars.

== Sources ==
- Atherton, Ian; and David Como (2006). The Burning of Edward Wightman: Puritanism, Prelacy and the Politics of Heresy in Early Modern England. English Historical Review, Volume 120, December 2005, Number 489, 1215–1250. Oxford: Oxford University Press.
- Croft, Pauline (2004). King James. Basingstoke and New York: Palgrave Macmillan. ISBN 0-333-61395-3.
- Krugler, John D. (2005). English and Catholic: the Lords Baltimore in the Seventeenth Century. Baltimore: Johns Hopkins University Press. ISBN 0-8018-7963-9.
- MacCulloch, Diarmaid (2009). A History of Christianity: The First Three Thousand Years. Allen Lane. ISBN 978-0-7139-9869-6.
- Solt, Leo Frank (1990). Church and State in Early Modern England: 1509-1640. Oxford: Oxford University Press.
- Stewart, Alan (2003). The Cradle King: A Life of James VI & I. London: Chatto and Windus. ISBN 0-7011-6984-2.
- Watts, Michael R (1985). The Dissenters: From the Reformation to the French Revolution. Oxford: Oxford University Press. ISBN 0-19-822956-9.
- Willson, David Harris ([1956] 1963 ed). King James VI & I. London: Jonathan Cape Ltd. ISBN 0-224-60572-0.
