= Jortin =

Jortin may also refer to:

- John Jortin (1698–1770), English church historian
- Jortin Forbes House, a single-family home located at 211 North Ann Arbor Street in Saline, Michigan
