= Henry Jacob =

English clergyman

Henry Jacob (1563–1624) was an English clergyman of Calvinist views, who founded the first true congregational church in England. Associated with the Brownists, he asserted the autonomy of the church, and advocated for ecclesiastical government without bishops. This stance challenged the hierarchy of the Church of England and led to his imprisonment and exile.

== Life ==
Henry Jacob was the son of John Jacob, yeoman, of Cheriton, Kent.

On 27 November 1581, he enrolled at St Mary Hall, Oxford and received his Bachelor of Arts degree in 1583, followed by a Master of Arts degree in 1586. Jacob inherited property at Godmersham near Canterbury, following the death of his father. He later served as a precentor of Corpus Christi College, Oxford.

In 1590, Jacob became a member of the Brownists whose beliefs resulted in Jacob being labelled as a 'semi-Separatist'. Contemporary scholars commonly use terms such as Independents, Brownists, semi-Separatists, or Puritans to describe individuals with similar beliefs to those expressed by Jacob. These beliefs were rooted in Calvinism, a branch of Protestantism. In 1593, when the Brownists were forced into exile, Jacob relocated to Holland. While there, he established a group of non-separatist individuals who were former members of the Church of England. Upon returning to England in 1597, he attended a sermon by Thomas Bilson at St Paul's Cross on Christ's descent into hell as mentioned in the Apostles' Creed. In disagreement with Bilson's teaching, Jacob wrote a pamphlet expressing his opposing views and again fled the country.

At the age of 36, Jacob's ideology, which was moderate compared to others of his time, sparked controversy and debate with Francis Johnson. Johnson was a former don at Cambridge University who had since become a dissenting clergyman and prominent separatist in the Barrowist movement. In response to Johnson's views, Jacob published A Defence of the Churches and Ministry of Englande in 1599, advocating for moderate reforms within the Church of England.

In the early years of James I's reign, there was widespread efforts to challenge the king's support for the forms and practices of the episcopal church. This included the 1603 Millenary Petition campaign, the Hampton Court Conference, various written works, and discussions in Parliament. Despite these, James I remained unwavering in his defence of the established church. Within this context, Henry Jacob emerged as an influential figure in the movement for religious reform. Jacob published a series of publications between 1604 and 1609 in which he condemned the illegitimacy of prelatical church government and its associated dangers. He advocated for congregationalism, which called for greater autonomy within the church, and proposed a second conference to address ongoing religious disputes. Jacob was unable to achieve any notable success in his pursuit for reform. As a result, he abandoned his scriptural arguments and appealed for 'toleration' for nonconforming Protestants who remained politically loyal. As part of this, he also adopted language more commonly associated with political negotiations and reasoning of state.

The views Jacob expressed within his 1604 publication Reasons taken out of Gods Word and the best humane Testimonies proving a necessitie of reforming our Churches in England resulted in his incarceration for eight months. Following his release, Jacob was exiled to Holland where he settled at Middelburg in Zeeland, and collected a congregation of English exiles. His group of 'Jacobites' included William Ames, Paul Barnes, William Bradshaw and Robert Parker.

In 1610 he went to Leyden to confer with John Robinson. Ultimately Jacob adopted Robinson's views on church government, but the influence was mutual.

In 1616 he returned to Southwark, London, with the aim of establishing a separatist congregation similar to those which he and Robinson had organised in Holland. The religious society which he brought together in Southwark is generally supposed to have been the first continuing congregational church in England. Puritan congregationalism represented a significant departure from the predominant presbyterianism of the Cartwright generation of puritanism. While the shift embraced a more liberal and democratic ecclesiological approach, the origins of this new polity have been a subject of interest among scholars. Jacob led this congregation for approximately six years, during which time the prominence of Henry Jacob's semi-separatist model and teachings inspired the spread of the movement to other congregations. These congregations did not completely break away from the Church of England but rather entered into a "covenant" pledging their commitment to a religious structure aligned with biblical principles commonly taught at the time. This church played a significant role in the development and spread of the Particular Baptist movement.

In October 1622, Jacob travelled to Virginia with some of his family and formed a settlement, which was named after him 'Jacobopolis'. He died in April or May 1624 in the parish of St Andrew Hubbard, London. By his wife Sara, sister of John Dumaresq of Jersey, who survived him, he had several children, including Henry Jacob the younger. John Lothropp picked up the threads of Jacob's London congregation.

== Bibliography ==
=== Primary sources ===
- Ames, William, 1576-1633. The relation of church and state [n.d.], in The Reformation of the Church, Murray, I. H. (ed.) [1965]
- ______. De Conscientia et ejus vel casibus (1630)
- ______. Conscience with the power and cases thereof. (Tr. out of Latine) (1639) [STC 552]
- Bilson, Thomas, 1546-7?-1616. The effect of certaine sermons, touching the full redemption of mankind (1599) [STC 3064]
- ______. Perpetual government of Christes Church
- Bradshaw, William, 1571-1618. A treatise of divine worship, tending to prove that the ceremonies imposed vpon the ministers of the Gospell in England, in the present controversie, are in their vse vnlawfull (1604) [STC 3528]
- ______. A Protestation of the King's Supremacie (1605) [STC 3525]
- Cosin, Richard, 1549?-1597. Answer to the two first and principall tin faction libel, put foorth latelie, without name of author or printer, and without approbation by authoritie, ...
- Dickinson, Edmund, 1624-1707. Delphi phoenicizantes, sive Tractatus, in quo Graecos, quicquid apud Delphos celebre erat: ... (1655) [EEb, 1641–1700; 528:19]
- Downame, George, d. 1634. Defence of the sermon preached at the consecration of the L. Bishop of Bath and Welles [1613]
- Featley, Daniel. The Dippers Dipt (1645)
- [Fenner, Dudley, 1558?-1587] A counter-poyson, modestly written for the time, to make aunswere to the obiections and reproaches, wherein the aunswere to the Abstract, would disgrace the holy discipline of Christ [1584] [EEb, 1475-1460; 224:8] [STC (2nd ed.) 10770] [ESTCS101936]
- Howard, Luke., A Looking-Glass for Baptists (1672)
- Jacob, Henry, 1563-1624.
- ______. A treatise of the sufferings and victory of Christ, in then work of our redemption declaring by the Scriptures these two questions, ... (1598) [EEb, 1475–1640; 936:16][STC 14340] [ESCTS107530]
- ______. A Defence of the Chvrches and Ministry of Englande. Written in two treatises, against the reasons and obiections of Maister Francis Iohnson. and others of the separation commonly called Brownists, ... (1599) [EEb, 1475–1640; 251:2][STC 14335] [ESTCS107526]
- ______. A short treatise concerning the trvenes of a pastorall calling in pastors made by prelates ... (1599)
- ______. A defence of a treatise touching the sufferings and victorie of Christ in the worke of our redemption. ... (1600) [EEb, 1475–1640; 936:15][STC (2nd ed.)14333] [ESTCS103093]
- ______. [Another. ed.] (1600) [STC 14334]
- ______. Reasons taken ovt of Gods Word and the best humane Testimonies proving a necessitie of reforming ovr churches in England ... (1603) [EEb, 1475–1640; 993:9][STC 14338] [ESTCS120955]
- ______. [Another ed.] (1909)
- ______. Principles and Foundations of the Christian Religion
- ______. A Third Humble Supplication of many faithful subjects in England falsely called Puritans directed to the King's Majesty (1605)
- ______. A Christian and Modest Offer of a Most Indifferent Conference or dispvtation, abovt the Maine and principall coutroversies betwixt the prelate, and the late silenced and deprived ministers in England (1606) [EEb, 1475–1640; 1145:3] [STC 14329] [ESTCS120767]
- ______. .To the High and mightie Prince, Iames by the grace of God, King of great Britannie, France, and Irelande ... : An Humble Supplication for Toleration and Libertie to Enjoy and Observe the Ordinances of Christ Jesus in th' administration of His Churches in Lieu of Human Constitutions (1609)
- ______. [Another ed.] (1975)
- ______. An humble Supplication for Toleration (1609)
- ______. Divine Beginnings and Institutions of Christ true Visible ... Church, (1610)
- ______. [The divine beginning of Christs church] (1610) [EEb, 1475–1640; 993:7] [STC 14336] [ESTCS101363]
- ______. A plaine and cleere Exposition of the Second Commandement (1610) [STC 14337]
- ______. A declaration and plainer opening of certaine pointes in the divine beginning of Christes true Church (1611) [STC 14331]
- ______. A declaration and plainer opening of certaine points, with a sound confirmation of some other, contained in a teatise intituled, The divine beginning and institution of Christes true visible and ministeriall church (1612) [EEb, 1475–1640; 1145:4, 1549:4][STC 14332] [ESTCS102836]
- ______. An Attestation of many Learned godly, and famous Divines, lightes of religion, and pillars of the Gospell, iustifying this doctrine, ... (1613) [EEb, 1475–1640; 993:5] [STC 14328] [ESTCS117858]
- ______. An Attestation of many divines that the Church-government ought to bee alwayes with the people's free consent (1613)
- ______. [Another ed.] (1975)
- ______. Anno Domini 1616. A Confession and Protestation of the Faith of certaine Christians in England [1616] [EEb, 1475–1640; 993:6] [STC 14330] [ESCTS120216]
- ______. Kneeling in the act of eating and drinking at the Lords table is a sinne. Proved by 8 arguments printed in the yeare. 1641. (1641) [Wing (2nd ed.) J96] [Thomason Tracts; 163:E.1102(5)][ESTCR208356]
- Jessey, Henry, 1603-1663. The Scripture-almanacke, or a calculation according to the English account, and the Word of God. [1646][EEb, 1641–1700; 2380:2] [Wing (CD-ROM, 1996) A1833A] [ESTCR223971]
- ______. [Another ed.] 1650. The scripture-kalendar, used by the prophets and apostles, and by our Lord Jesus Christ [1650] [EEb, 1641–1700; 2322:4] [Wing A1835A] [ECTSR229487]
- ______. A Storehouse of Provision (1650)
- ______. Miscellanea sacra, or, Diverse necessary truths, now as seasonably published, as they were plainly and compendeously proved by Henry Jessey, late minister of the Gospel in London (1665) [EEb, 1641–1700; 1950:6] [Wing (2nd ed.) J695] [ESTCR216570]
- ______. A Looking-glass for children being a narrative of God's gracious dealings with some little children, recollectedby Henry Jessey in his lifetime [4th ed.; 1673] [EEB, 1641–1700; 2292:24] [Wing P30A] [ESTCR42778]
- ______. [Another ed.] (1709)[ESTCW38859]
- ______. "Letters to Henry Jacie", in Collections (Mass. Historical Society), 3rd ser., 1; 4th ser., 6
- Johnson, Francis, 1562-1618. An answer to Maister H. Iacob his defence of the churches and ministry of England. By Francis Johnson an exile of Iesus Christ (1600) [EEb, 1475–1640; 994:11] [STC 14658] [ESTCS121679]
- Killcop, Thomas, A short Treatise of Baptisme (1642)
- Ormerod, Oliver, 1580?-1626. The Picture of a Puritane; or a relation of the opinions a. practises of the Anabaptists in Germanie a. of the puritanes in England. Whereunto is annexed Puritano-papismus (1605) [STC 18851]
- ______. [Anr. ed.] Newly corrected and enlarged (1605) [STC 18852]
- Staresmore, Sabine (fl. 1616-1647). Unlawfullnes of Reading in Prayer (1619)

=== Secondary sources ===
- Brachlow, S., The Communion of Saints: Radical Puritan and Separatists Ecclesiology 1570-1625 (1988)
- ______. "The Elizabethan Roots of Henry Jacob's Churchmanship", Journal of Ecclesiastical History, 36 (1985)
- Dodd, J. A., "The Eschatology of Praise-God Barebone", Transactions of the Congregational Historical Society, 4 (1909–10)
- Hylson-Smith, K., The Churches in England from Elizabeth I to Elizabeth II, Vol. 1, 1558-1688 (1996)
- Nuttall, G. F., Visible Saints: The Congregational Way 1640-1660 (1957)
- Paul, R. S., "Henry Jacob and Seventeenth-Century Puritanism", Hartford Quarterly, 7 (1967)
- Tolmie, M., The Triumph of the Saints, The Separate Churches of London, 1616-1649 (1977)
- ______. "The Jacob Church", in The Triumph of the Saints, The Separate Churches of London, 1616-1649 (1977)
- von Rohr, J., "The Congregationalism of Henry Jacob", Transactions of the Congregational Historical Society, 19 (1962)
- ______. "Extra Ecclesiam Nulla Salus: An Early Congregational Version", Church History, 36 (1967)
- White, B. R., "How did William Kiffin join the Baptist?", Baptist Quarterly, 23
- ______. "Samuel Eaton (d. 1639), Particular Baptist Pioneer", Baptist Quarterly, 24
- Whitley, W. T., "Debate of Infant Baptism, 1643", Transactions of the Baptist Historical Society, 1 (1908–09)
- ______. "The Jacob-Jessey Church, 1616-1678", Transactions of the Baptist Historical Society, 1 (1908–09)
- ______."Records of the Jabob-Lathrop-Jessey Church, 1616-1641", Transactions of the Baptist Historical Society 1, (1908–09)
- ______. 'Rise of the Particular Baptists in London, 1633–1644, Transactions of the Baptist Historical Society 1, (1908–09)
