= James Montague (bishop) =

English bishop

The Right Reverend and Right Honourable James Montague
- Bishop of Winchester
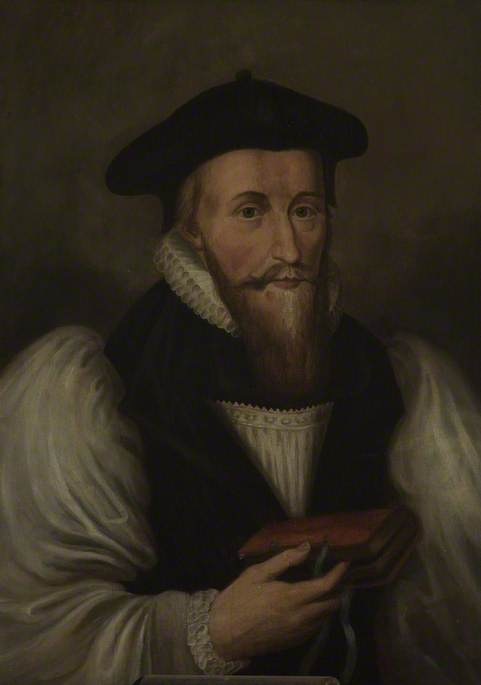
- Diocese: Diocese of Winchester
- In office: 1616 (translation)–1618 (death)
- Predecessor: Thomas Bilson
- Successor: Lancelot Andrewes
- Other posts: Master of Sidney Sussex (1596–1608); Dean of the Chapel Royal (1603–1618); Dean of Lichfield (1603–1604); Dean of Worcester (1604–1608); Bishop of Bath and Wells (1608–1616) privy counsellor (October 1617–1618)

Personal details
- Born: 1568 Boughton, Northamptonshire, England
- Died: 20 July 1618 (aged 49–50) Greenwich, Kent, England
- Buried: Greenwich (bowels); 20 August 1618, Bath Abbey (body)
- Denomination: Anglican
- Parents: Sir Edward Montague of Boughton & Elizabeth (née Harington of Exton), Lady Montague
- Education: Christ's College, Cambridge

Ordination history of James Montague
History
Episcopal consecration
- Principal consecrator: Richard Bancroft (Canterbury)
- Co-consecrators: Thomas Ravis (London); Henry Cotton (Salisbury); William Barlow (Rochester); Lancelot Andrewes (Chichester); Henry Parry (Gloucester)

James Montague (c. 1568 – 20 July 1618) was an English bishop.

== Life ==
He was the son of Sir Edward Montagu of Boughton and Elizabeth Harington, and grandson of Edward Montagu.

He was a graduate of Christ's College, Cambridge, and became in 1596 the first Master of Sidney Sussex College, Cambridge, for which he laid the foundation stone. He was connected to Frances Sidney, founder of the college, his great-aunt: his maternal grandmother was her sister Lucy Sidney. From that time he was a patron of Thomas Gataker. In 1603 he became Dean of the Chapel Royal. Montague was both a courtier and a Calvinist, and closer to the king than George Abbot, Archbishop of Canterbury; he is considered to have influenced James I against the Arminians. With the other courtiers Sir Robert Darcy and John Harington, 1st Baron Harington of Exton, Montague introduced to court circles, and especially those around Henry Frederick, Prince of Wales, the Puritan Arthur Hildersham, and the radical religious figures Henry Jacob and John Burges.

He edited the collected works of James I; it has been said that his introductions "push the art of panegyric close to deification". He had worked with James on An Apologie for the Oath of Allegiance in 1607, at Royston and Newmarket, reading to James the four volumes of the works of Cardinal Bellarmine.

He was Dean of Lichfield from July 1603 until he became Dean of Worcester on 20 December 1604. Montague was elected Bishop of Bath and Wells on 29 March 1608, his election was confirmed on 15 April and he was enthroned and installed at Wells Cathedral on 14 May 1608; he was translated to become Bishop of Winchester on 3 July 1616.

As Bishop of Bath and Wells, Montague spent considerable sums in restoring both the Bishop's Palace at Wells and Bath Abbey; this last, roofless since the Reformation, was re-roofed out of his own pocket. He actively supported the Baths themselves, aware that the ‘towne liveth wholly by them’. In 1613, perhaps at his behest, the Queen, Anne of Denmark, visited the town to take the waters: the Queen's Bath was named after her. The cue for the visit may have been the completion of the restoration work to Bath Abbey, the last instalment of which had been paid for two years previously. In the same year (probably) and at Wells (probably), Montague staged a "Panegiricall entertainement" for the queen, whose cast included the character of Joseph of Arimathea, who presented a bough from the Holy Thorn of Glastonbury to the queen, the first explicit link between Joseph and the Thorn. He is commemorated by an alabaster monument in Bath Abbey.

== Sources ==
- "Montagu, James". Oxford Dictionary of National Biography (online ed.). Oxford University Press. doi:10.1093/ref:odnb/19021. (Subscription, Wikipedia Library access or UK public library membership required.)

Academic offices
New post	Master of Sidney Sussex College, Cambridge; 1596–1608	Succeeded by Francis Aldrich
Church of England titles
Preceded by John Still	Bishop of Bath and Wells; 1608–1616	Succeeded by Arthur Lake
Preceded by Thomas Bilson	Bishop of Winchester; 1616–1618	Succeeded by Lancelot Andrewes
