= Daniel Rogers =

Daniel or Danny Rogers may refer to:

- Daniel Rogers (politician) (1754–1806), miller and politician from Delaware
- Daniel Rogers (Puritan) (1573–1652), English Puritan clergyman
- Daniel Rogers (diplomat) (1538–1591), English agent in the United Provinces
- Danny Rogers (born 1994), Irish football goalkeeper
- Danny Rogers (stuntman) (1943–2021), American stuntman

== See also ==
- Daniel T. Rodgers (born 1942), American historian
