= John of London (ship) =

17th-century ship

The John of London was a ship famous for bringing the first printing press to the British Colonies of North America; however, the first press in the American continent had arrived in 1536 in Mexico City by Juan Pablos in representation of Juan Cromberger.

== Construction and Service ==
The John of London was possibly built during the 1620s by Robert Trenckmore in his shipyards at Shoreham-By-Sea in West Sussex, England. At least once during her 20-30 year lifespan, she was refitted as a fighting ship.

== Brings the first printing press to North America ==
The ship was captained by George Lamberton during her 1638 voyage from Hull, Yorkshire to Boston, Massachusetts. This voyage brought Ezekiel Rogers and a number of families that went on to settle Rowley, Massachusetts. The voyage was also notable for bringing the first printing press to North America, which went on to be used at Harvard College.

== Fate ==
The John of London was captured and sunk near Bass Rock in the Firth of Forth, Scotland, during 1650.
