= Ezekiel Rogers =

English nonconformist clergyman and Puritan settler of Massachusetts

Ezekiel Rogers 1590 (Date unknown) – January 23, 1660) was an English nonconformist clergyman, and Puritan settler of Massachusetts.

== Life ==
He was a son of Richard Rogers, who held the living of Wethersfield in Essex, and younger brother of Daniel Rogers. He graduated M.A. from Christ's College, Cambridge in 1604, and became chaplain in the family of Sir Francis Barrington in Essex. He was preferred by his patron to the living of Rowley in Yorkshire.

In December 1638, after seventeen years of service, Rogers was discharged from his post as rector of Rowley, after he had refused to read The Book of Sports. Believing the future of Puritanism was at stake, he left for the New World with the members of twenty families of his congregation.

He arrived in New England in December 1638 with the families on the ship John of London, and wintered at Salem, Massachusetts. The first printing press brought to America came on board the ship with them, with the printer Stephen Daye. Theophilus Eaton and John Davenport were then setting up their colony at New Haven; they tried to enlist Rogers, but without success.

Early in the spring of 1639 he and most of these twenty families settled in the town of Rowley, Massachusetts. Rowley was incorporated on September 4, 1639. Rogers was the pastor at Rowley until his death on 23 January 1661. He was three times married: first, to Sarah, widow of John Everard; secondly, Elizabeth Wilson, daughter of John Wilson of the First Church in Boston; thirdly, to Mary, widow of Thomas Barker. He left no children.

== Works ==
Rogers published The Chief Grounds of the Christian Religion set down by way of catechising, gathered long since for the use of an honourable Family, London, 1642. Several of his letters to John Winthrop are published in the Massachusetts Historical Collection (4th ser. vii.)
