= William Sandys (MP for Winchester) =

English politician

Sir William Sandys (c. 1575 – 28 October 1628) was an English politician, MP for Winchester.

Sandys was the only son of Sir Walter Sandys MP and his wife Mabel, daughter of Thomas Wriothesley, 1st Earl of Southampton.

On 22 November 1596 he married Elizabeth, daughter of Sir William Cornwallis MP. They had no offspring.

Sandys was knighted on 22 July 1601. He served as a JP in Hampshire from 1604, a freeman and alderman of Winchester from 1607, Commissioner of Gaol Delivery for Winchester from 1612, and High Sheriff of Hampshire 1611–12.

He was elected MP for Winchester in the Addled Parliament of 1614.

Sandys died on 28 October 1628, and was buried at Mottisfont.

Parliament of England
Preceded by John Moore; Edward Cole	Member of Parliament for Winchester; 1614; With: Sir Thomas Bilson	Succeeded by Richard Tichborne; William Savage
