= Thomas Bilson (MP for Winchester) =

English politician

Sir Thomas Bilson (1592 – c. 1647) was an English politician, serving as MP for Winchester.

== Life ==
Bilson was the oldest son of Thomas Bilson, Bishop of Winchester and his wife Anne, daughter of Thomas Mill MP. He was baptised on 29 February 1592.

He was educated at New College, Oxford, matriculating in 1606; entered Lincoln's Inn in 1609; and accompanied ambassador Sir Stephen Lesieur to Florence in 1609.

Bilson was knighted on 25 October 1613, soon after his father Bishop Bilson had been appointed an additional judge on the commission on the annulment of the marriage of the Countess of Essex to marry the royal favourite Robert Carr. Bishop Bilson supported Carr and the annulment: his son was therefore known as court as "Sir Nullity Bilson".

Bilson served as a JP in Hampshire 1614–1621, Commissioner of Sewers for Winchester in 1617, Commissioner of Subsidy for Hampshire 1621–22 and 1624, and Commissioner of Assessment for Hampshire in 1641.

He was elected MP for Winchester in the Addled Parliament of 1614.

Bilson drew up his will on 24 August 1647. His date of death is uncertain: the will was not proved until 1661.

== Family ==
On 6 August 1612 Bilson married Susanna Uvedale, daughter of Sir William Uvedale MP. They had five sons and two daughters:

- Thomas Bilson (died 1652)
- Harman Bilson (1614–1633)
- Leonard Bilson MP (1616–1695)
- William Bilson (died 1681)
- Anne Bilson (died 1644)
- Susan Bilson (died 1665), married Thomas Bettesworth
- Osmund Bilson (died 1678)

Parliament of England
Preceded by John Moore; Edward Cole	Member of Parliament for Winchester; 1614; With: Sir William Sandys	Succeeded by Richard Tichborne; William Savage
