= Thomas Sparke =

English clergyman

Thomas Sparke (1548–1616) was an English clergyman, who represented the Puritan point of view both at the 1584 Lambeth Conference and the 1604 Hampton Court Conference.

== Life ==
He was born at South Somercotes, Lincolnshire. He was elected to a demyship at Magdalen College, Oxford, in 1567, and was fellow there from 1569 to 1572. He graduated B.A. in October 1570, M.A. in June 1574, B.D. in July 1575, and D.D. on 1 July 1581. Having taken holy orders, he became chaplain to Thomas Cooper, Bishop of Lincoln, by whom he was made archdeacon of Stow on 1 March 1575. By the favour of Arthur Grey, 14th Baron Grey de Wilton, he was presented also to the rectory of Bletchley, Buckinghamshire, where he was instituted on 2 September 1578. The rectory and archdeaconry being at some distance from each other, Sparke resigned the latter "out of conscience" in 1582. On 26 September of the same year he was installed prebendary of Lincoln.

Together with Walter Travers, Sparke represented the Puritan positions in a conference held at Lambeth in December 1584 with Archbishop John Whitgift and Cooper as Bishop of Winchester, Robert Dudley, 1st Earl of Leicester, and Francis Walsingham being present. They protested against the reading of the apocryphal scriptures in churches, against private and lay baptism, the use of the sign of the cross, the celebration of private communions, and the allowance of plurality and non-residence. Neither party was satisfied.

On 14 September 1585 Sparke preached at Chenies, Buckinghamshire, a funeral sermon on Francis Russell, 2nd Earl of Bedford; he also preached at the funeral of his patron, Lord Grey de Wilton, on 22 November 1593, at Whaddon, Buckinghamshire. In 1591 he published an Answere to Mr. John de Albine's notable Discourse against Heresies, against Jean d'Albin de Valsergues; his opponent's complete text is inserted and answered chapter by chapter.

He was summoned by James I to the Hampton Court conference in 1604 as a nonconformist (along with John Rainolds, Laurence Chaderton and John Knewstubs). Anthony à Wood says that he appeared there in 1604 unconventionally dressed, and he reportedly said little. The king, however, was gracious. Sparke, in later writing A Brotherly Persuasion to Unity and Uniformity in Judgment and Practice (1607), adopted an eirenic line. He was attacked in An Antidote against the Pestiferous Writings of all English Sectaries ... in particular against Dr. Sparke, (1615) by Sylvester Norris.

After the conference, Sparke was one of many people who was involved in the translation of the Bible which became known as the King James Version.

Sparke died at Bletchley on 8 October 1616. He was buried in the chancel of the parish church, where a monument with an epitaph was erected to him by his eldest son.

== Family ==
Sparke married Rose Inkforbye of Ipswich; of their ten children, only five survived her death on 7 August 1615. Of the sons, William Sparke (1587–1641) became chaplain to George Villiers, 1st Duke of Buckingham, and succeeded his father as incumbent of Bletchley, but fell into debt and was forced to quit.

== Publications ==
His works include;

- A short treatise, very comfortable for all those Christians that be troubled and disquieted in theyr consciences with the sight of their owne infirmities, 1580
- The high vvay to Heaven by the cleare light of the Gospell, 1597
- A brotherly persvvasion to vnitie, 1607
