= Arthur Lake (bishop) =

Bishop of Bath and Wells

The Right Reverend Arthur Lake
- Bishop of Bath and Wells
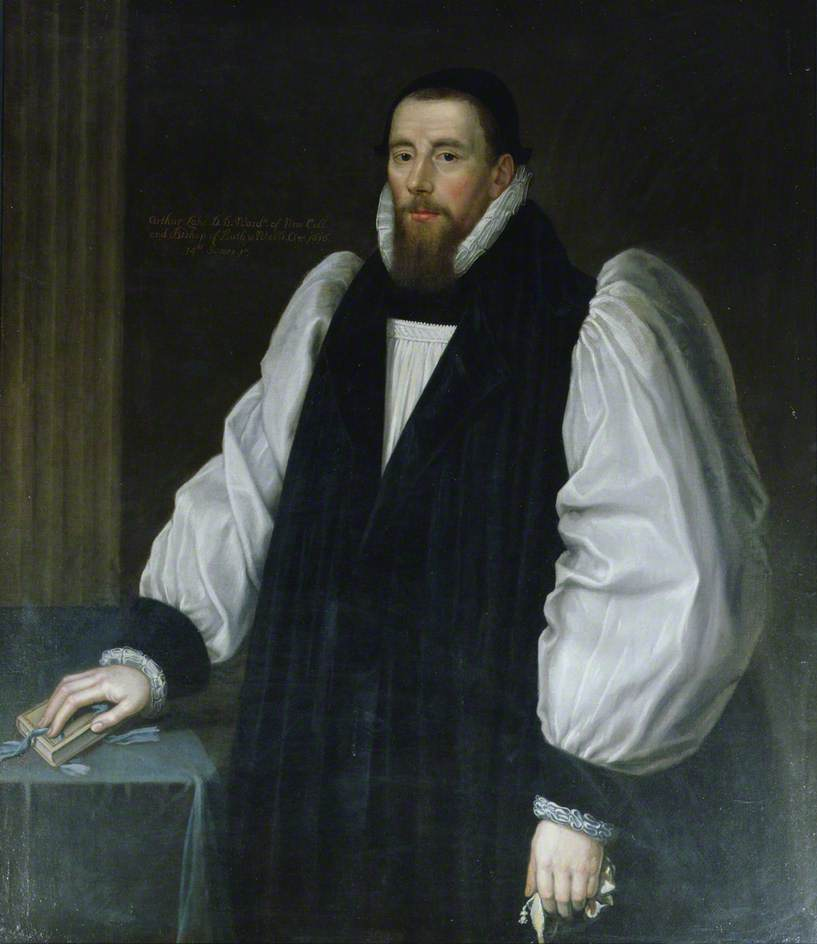
- Courtesy of the Warden and Scholars of New College, Oxford
- Diocese: Diocese of Bath and Wells
- In office: 1616–1626
- Predecessor: James Montague
- Successor: William Laud
- Other post: Dean of Worcester (1608–1616)

Personal details
- Born: September 1569 Southampton
- Died: 4 May 1626 (aged 56) Wells
- Buried: Wells Cathedral
- Denomination: Anglican
- Education: New College, Oxford

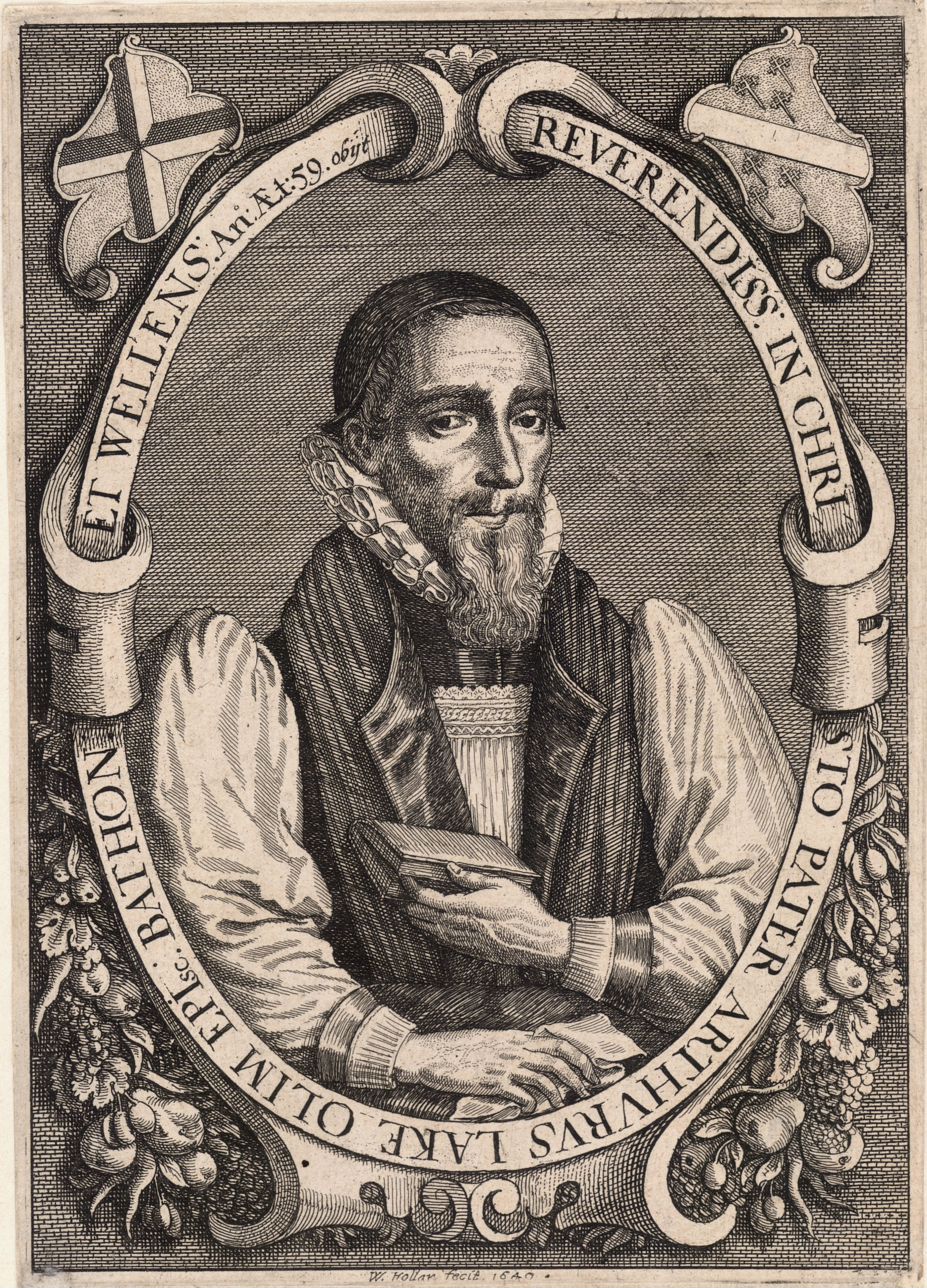
A contemporary engraving of Arthur Lake by Wenceslas Hollar.

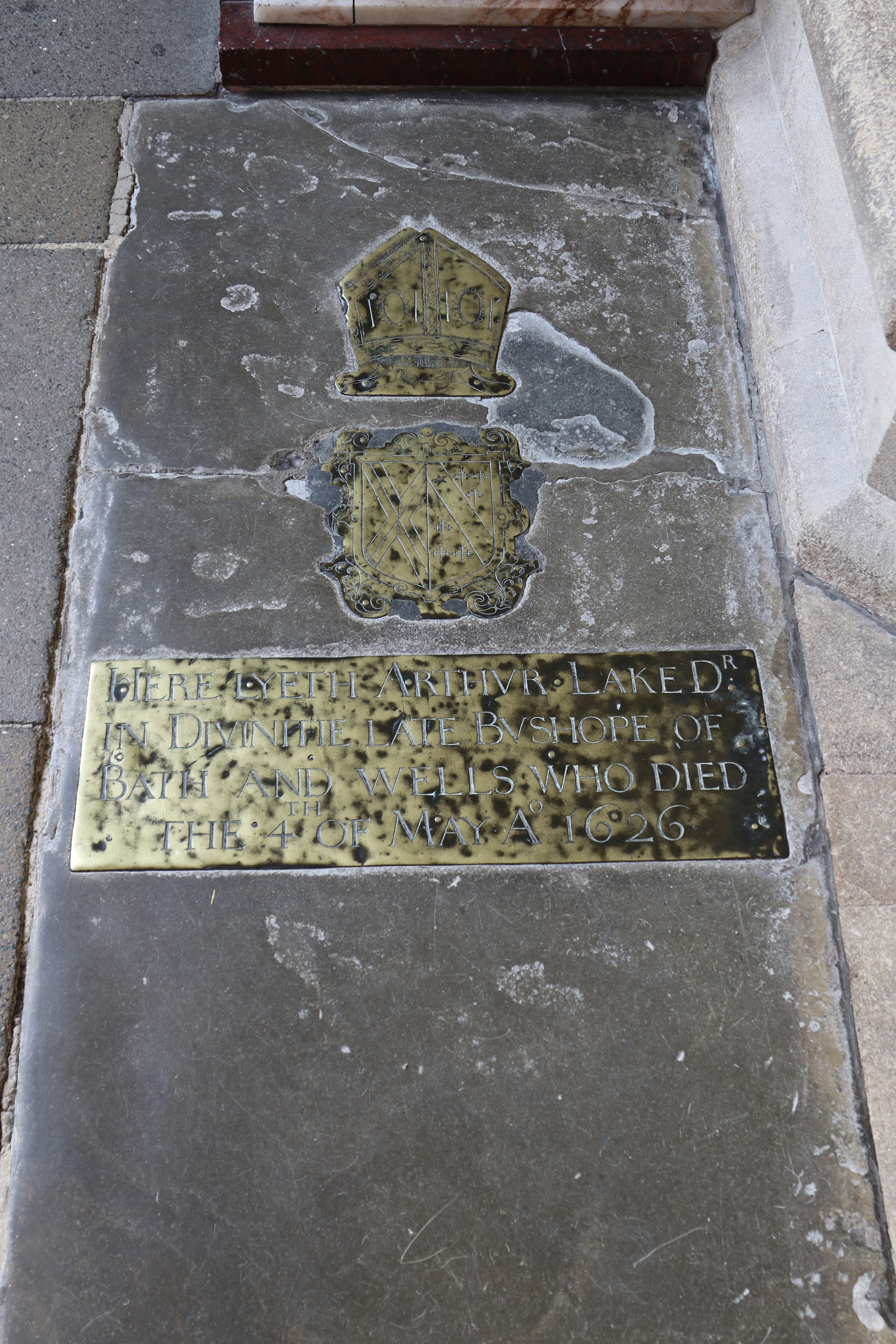
Tomb in Wells Cathedral

Arthur Lake (September 1569 – 4 May 1626) was Bishop of Bath and Wells and a translator of the King James Version of The Bible.

Arthur Lake was born in Southampton in September 1569 the son of Almeric Lake, a minor customs official. He and his younger brother Thomas attended King Edward VI School, Southampton. Arthur stayed there until he was twelve and on 28 December 1581 he was elected a scholar of Winchester College, where he remained until he was eighteen when he became a scholar of New College, Oxford. He matriculated in July 1588, was elected a fellow of the college in 1589, accepted the degree of BA on 4 June 1591 and MA on 3 May 1595. He was presented to the rectory of Havant, Hampshire in 1599. He resigned his fellowship at Oxford in 1600, and on 16 June was admitted a fellow of Winchester College. In 1601 he became rector of Hambledon (near Havant), and of Chilcomb, near Winchester, in 1603.

He was awarded a DD at Oxford and in 1609 he may have been one of the clergymen charged with editing the new English translation of the Bible commissioned by James I for whom his brother Sir Thomas acted as a secretary. There is no unequivocal evidence for this but the initials "AL" appear throughout the notes of the General Committee of Review and no other candidate has been proposed.

== Appointments ==
=== Dean of Worcester ===
On 26 February 1608 John Still died and James Montague, Dean of Worcester, succeeded him as Bishop of Bath and Wells. Three days later, Richard Neile, Dean of Westminster, wrote to Sir Thomas Lake, asking whether his brother would like to be appointed to the Worcester deanery, or would rather wait for Winchester. Arthur Lake chose to be Dean of Worcester, was presented by the King on 18 April, and installed on 23 April. He assisted the Chapter to buy in a long lease of certain cathedral lands, which had been illegally made. He paid for the cathedral´s Dallam organ. The organ cost £211 and was built to the specifications of Thomas Tomkins the cathedral organist. When Henry Frederick, Prince of Wales died, Lake provided the text of a funeral anthem which was set to music by Tomkins.

=== Bishop of Bath and Wells ===
In 1616 he resigned the archdeaconry of Surrey and later that year he became Bishop of Bath and Wells. His election on 17 October received royal assent the next day. His archbishopric was confirmed on 6 December and consecrated at Lambeth Palace two days later. His enthronement was held on 3 January 1617 and the King appointed him Keeper of the Great Seal. He was knighted in August of the same year.

He continued to hold his other offices as well as his bishopric. He was warden of New College and vice-chancellor of Oxford University until July 1618, and he held the living of Stanton St John along with his bishopric until his death.

Thomas Fuller noted that he was promoted "not so much by the power of his brother, sir Thomas, as his own deserts, as one whose piety may be justly exemplary to all of his order". Richard Smith, another of his contemporaries, was much impressed by his great humility, temperance, affability and contempt of riches. Smith described him as one of the ‘greatest benefactors of our times’ who ruled his household well.

His probity was demonstrated when on 15 July 1618 his brother Thomas was freed from prison (where he had been held for slandering the Countess of Exeter) and handed over to Arthur's custody.

== Later years ==
Arthur Lake spent the last eight years of his life in quiet industry at Wells. Izaak Walton, said that he made "the great trust committed to him the chief care and whole business of life". He preached often in the cathedral and the adjacent parishes and he strived to improve the standard of preaching throughout his diocese. Unlike many bishops who relied on others to examine candidates for ordination, he conducted such examinations personally.

He died on 4 May 1626. His tomb may still be seen in Wells Cathedral and his collection of 300 books forms the basis of the cathedral library.

=== Bibliography ===
- Calendar of the Manuscripts of the Dean and Chapter of Wells, 2 vols. (London: Historical Manuscripts Commission, 1907)
- Calendar of State Papers preserved in the Public Record Office, Domestic Series, 1603–10, London, 1856–1964
- Lambeth Palace Library, Register of George Abbot
- Folger Shakespeare Library, V.a.510, Richard Smith Papers
- Benson Bobrick, The Making of The English Bible, (New York: Simon & Schuster, 2001)
- William Camden, 'Annals', in A Complete History of England (London, 1706)
- Arthur J. Jewers, Wells Cathedral: its Monumental Inscriptions and Heraldry, (London: Mitchell and Hughes, 1892)
- William Laud, The Autobiography of Dr William Laud – Collected From His Remains,(Oxford: John Henry Parker, 1839)
- Dana F. Sutton (ed), William Camden's Diary (1603–1623): A hypertext edition, <www.philological.bham.ac.uk/diary/>, (26 April 2002)
- Izaak Walton, The Life of Dr Sanderson, (London, 1678)

Church of England titles
| Preceded by James Montague | Dean of Worcester; 1608–1616 | Succeeded by Joseph Hall |
| Preceded by James Montague | Bishop of Bath and Wells; 1616–1626 | Succeeded by William Laud |
