= Thomas Bilson =

Anglican bishop (1547–1616)

The Right Reverend and Right Honourable Thomas Bilson
- Lord Bishop of Winchester
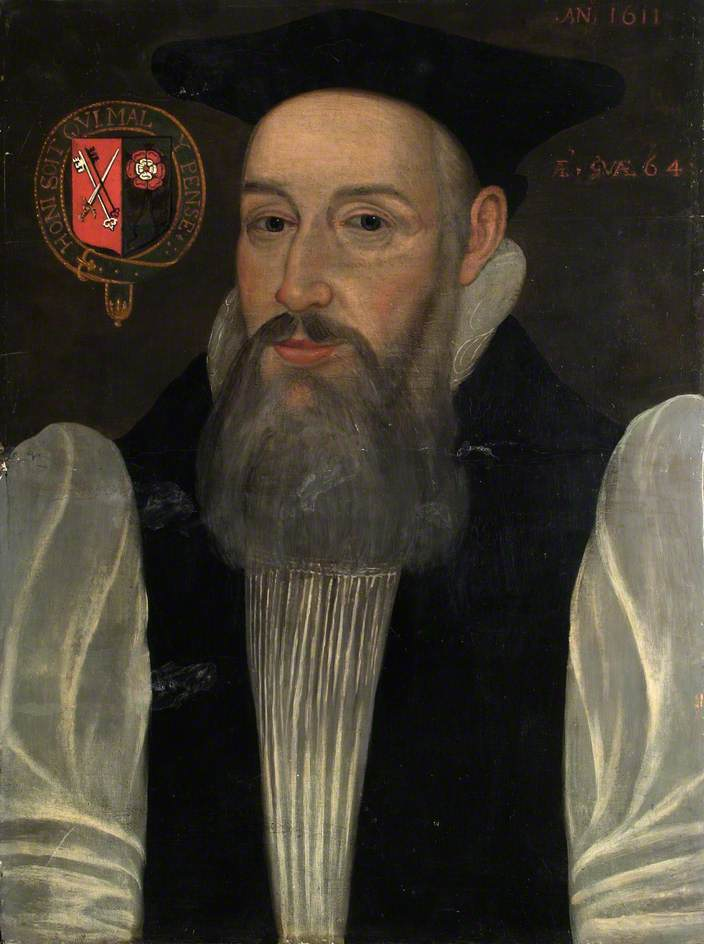
- Province: Church of England
- See: Winchester
- Installed: 1597
- Predecessor: William Day
- Successor: James Montague
- Other post: Bishop of Worcester (1596–1597)

Personal details
- Born: 1547 Winchester, England
- Died: 18 June 1616 (aged 68–69)

Thomas Bilson (1547 – 18 June 1616) was an Anglican Bishop of Worcester and Bishop of Winchester. With Miles Smith, he oversaw the final edit and printing of the King James Bible.

== Life ==
=== Years under the Tudors (1547–1603) ===
Thomas Bilson's father, Harmann Bilson, is said to have been a descendant of the Duke of Bavaria through his own grandmother, the wife of Arnold Bilson, a citizen of "High Germany". Harmann became a fellow of Merton College, Oxford in 1537 and graduated B.A. on 27 March 1538/39. Thomas was one of his six children (three sons and three daughters), and was born in the city of Winchester. Other sources highlight the fact that the celebrated William Twisse was a nephew of Thomas Bilson's.

Bilson was educated at William of Wykeham's twin foundations of Winchester College and New College, Oxford. He was a fellow of New College from 1563 to 1572, graduating B.A. in 1566 and M.A. in 1570. He began to distinguish himself as a poet until, on receiving ordination, he gave himself wholly to theological studies, in which he was awarded B.D. in 1579 and D.D. in 1580/81. He was soon made prebendary of Winchester, and headmaster of the college there until 1579 and warden from 1581 to 1596. His pupils there included John Owen, and Thomas James, whom he influenced in the direction of patristics. In 1596, he was made Bishop of Worcester, where he found Warwick uncomfortably full of recusant Roman Catholics. For appointment in 1597 to the wealthy see of Winchester, he paid a £400 annuity to Elizabeth I.

=== The True Difference ===
Thomas engaged in most of the polemical contests of his day, as a stiff partisan of the Church of England. In 1585, he published his The True Difference Betweene Christian Subjection and Unchristian Rebellion, with a dedication to Queen Elizabeth. (A pirated edition appeared in London in the following year.) This work took aim at the Jesuits and replied to Cardinal William Allen's Defence of the English Catholics (Ingoldstadt, 1584). It was also a theoretical work on the "Christian commonwealth" and it enjoyed publishing success.

Anthony à Wood remarked that Queen Elizabeth employed Bilson to write the book (which gave "strange liberty" for subjects to cast off their religious obedience to the state), as a convenience to shelter, with the Dutch Protestants, from the influence of king Philip II of Spain, as much as to counter the Jesuits' attacks on Elizabeth I. Glenn Burgess considered that, in The True Difference, Bilson showed a sense of the diversity of legitimate political systems. Bilson conceded nothing to popular sovereignty, but wrote that there were occasions when a king might forfeit his powers. James Shapiro observed that Bilson "does his best to walk a fine line", in discussing 'political icons', i.e. pictures of the monarch, echoing Lamont's verdict, "a judicious piece of tightrope walking on behalf of an embarrassed queen".

=== Theological controversy ===
A theological argument over the Harrowing of Hell led to several attacks on Bilson personally in what is now called the Descensus controversy. Bilson's literal views on the descent of Christ into Hell were orthodox for "conformist" Anglicans of the time, while the Puritan wing of the church preferred a metaphorical or spiritual reading. He maintained that Christ went to hell, not to suffer, but to wrest the keys of hell out of the Devil's hands. For this doctrine he was severely handled by Henry Jacob and also by other Puritans. Hugh Broughton, a noted Hebraist, was excluded from the translators of the King James Bible, and became a vehement early critic.

The origin of Broughton's published attack on Bilson as a scholar and theologian, from 1604, is thought to lie in a sermon Bilson gave in 1597, which Broughton, at first and wrongly, thought supported his own view that hell and paradise coincided in place. From another direction the Roman Catholic controversialist Richard Broughton also attacked Anglican conformists through Bilson's views, writing in 1607. Much feeling was excited by the controversy, and Queen Elizabeth, in her ire, commanded Bilson "neither to desert the doctrine, nor let the calling which he bore in the Church of God, be trampled under foot, by such unquiet refusers of truth and authority."

Bilson's most famous work was entitled The Perpetual Government of Christ's Church and was published in 1593. It was a systematic attack on Presbyterian polity and an able defence of Episcopal polity. Following on from John Bridges, the work is still regarded as one of the strongest books ever written in behalf of episcopacy.

=== Southwark and the theatres ===
Winchester Palace, the official London residence of the Bishops of Winchester, was a fine edifice on the south waterfront of the Thames opposite the city of London, situated in the district of Southwark (in Surrey), and surrounded by its own manor, called the Manor of the Bishop of Winchester, over which the bishops held nominal jurisdiction. In Clink Street, Southwark, one end wall of the palace hall, containing a rose window thirteen feet in diameter, is all that now remains standing. The manor was also called the "Liberty of the Clink", because it included the prison called "The Clink". Being free of the county jurisdiction of Surrey, and of London, the Liberty became especially associated with the late Elizabethan theatres, and was renowned for its brothels, its gambling dens, skittle alleys and places for bear-baiting. Rules for the regulation of the brothels were introduced by the bishops (who benefited by receiving taxes), and an unconsecrated graveyard was established for the women who had worked in them.

Among the successful men of business at Southwark was Philip Henslowe (1550–1616), who acquired interests in inns and lodging houses, and was engaged in dyeing, starch-making and the sale of wood, and in pawnbroking and money lending. He became a theatrical entrepreneur and impresario. In 1587, he and John Cholmley built The Rose, which was the third of the large, permanent playhouses in London, and the first in Bankside. The actors' company called the Admiral's Men broke with James Burbage, of The Theatre (Curtain Road, Shoreditch) over the division of receipts, and Henslowe partnered with them, and with Edward Alleyn, from 1591. In 1596 Francis Langley built the Swan Theatre in Southwark, and it was in 1597 that Thomas Bilson became Bishop of Winchester. In 1598 Burbage's company (by then, the Lord Chamberlain's Men) built the new Globe Theatre in the Clink Liberty, and Henslowe removed the Admiral's Men to the Fortune Theatre, in the north-western corner of the city. In 1613 Henslowe (who also had interests in the Swan Theatre and the Newington Butts Theatre) built the Hope Theatre in Bankside. He became increasingly autocratic, and in 1615 a company of actors brought "Articles of Grievance and Oppression against Philip Henslowe", claiming (among many other complaints) that he had said, "Should these fellowes come out of my debt I should have no rule over them."

Some connection between Shakespeare and Bilson is reflected in an entry in the Exchequer rolls for 6 October 1600, where William Shakespeare "in the parish of St Helens" (Bishopsgate) is found to owe 13s.4d to the Bishop of Winchester. This may relate to The Globe lying in the bishop's jurisdiction, for although Ian Wilson speculated that Shakespeare may have lived within the Liberty, the churchwardens there did not list him for compulsory attendance at Easter Communion.

=== Courtier to James I (1603–1616) ===
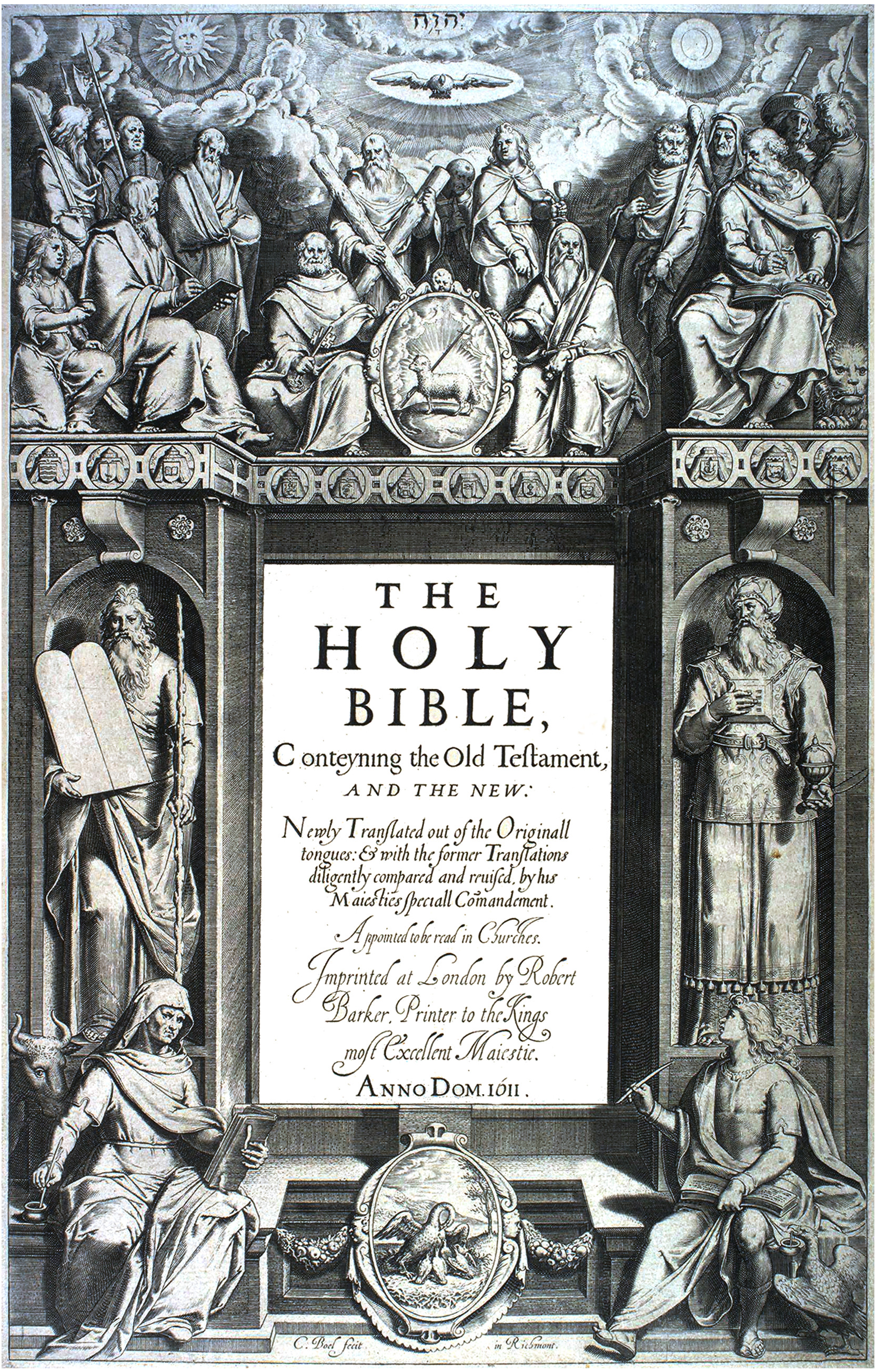
The title page to the 1611 first edition of the Authorized Version Bible.

Bilson gave the sermon at the coronation on 25 July 1603 of James VI and I and Anne of Denmark. While the wording conceded something to the divine right of kings, it also included a caveat about lawful resistance to a monarch. This theme was from Bilson's 1585 book, and already sounded somewhat obsolescent.

At the Hampton Court Conference of 1604, he and Richard Bancroft implored King James to change nothing in the Church of England. He had in fact advised James in 1603 not to hold the Conference, and to leave religious matters to the professionals. The advice might have prevailed, had it not been for Patrick Galloway, Moderator of the Scottish Assembly. Later, in charge of the Authorized Version, he composed the front matter with Miles Smith, his share being the dedication.

He bought the manor of West Mapledurham, near Petersfield, Hampshire, in 1605. Later, in 1613, he acquired the site of Durford Abbey, Rogate, Sussex.

He was ex officio visitor of St John's College, Oxford, and so was called to intervene when in 1611 the election as president of William Laud was disputed, with a background tension of Calvinist versus Arminian. The other candidate was John Rawlinson. Bilson, taken to be on the Calvinist side, found that the election of the high-church Laud had failed to follow the college statutes. He in the end ruled in favour of Laud, but only after some intrigue: Bilson had difficulty in having his jurisdiction recognised by the group of Laud's activists, led unscrupulously by William Juxon. Laud's party had complained, to the King, who eventually decided the matter himself, leaving the status quo, and instructed Bilson.

=== Final years ===
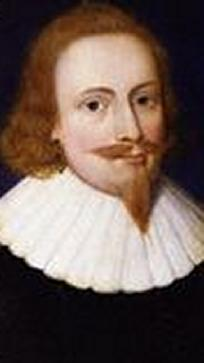
The 1st Earl of Somerset

He was appointed a judge in the 1613 annulment case of Robert Devereux, 3rd Earl of Essex and his wife Frances née Howard; with John Buckridge, bishop of Rochester, he was one of two extra judges added by the King to the original 10, who were deadlocked. This caused bitterness on the part of George Abbot, the archbishop of Canterbury, who was presiding over the nullity commission. Abbot felt that neither man was impartial, and that Bilson bore him an old grudge. Bilson played a key role in the outcome, turning away the Earl of Essex's appeal to appear a second time before the commission, and sending away Henry Wriothesley, 3rd Earl of Southampton who was asking on behalf of Essex with a half-truth about the position (which was that the King had intervened against Essex). The outcome of the case was a divorce, and Bilson was then in favour with Robert Carr, 1st Earl of Somerset, a favourite in the court who proceeded to marry Frances. Bilson's son Sir Thomas Bilson was nicknamed "Sir Nullity Bilson", because his knighthood followed on the outcome of the Essex annulment case.

In August 1615 Bilson was made a member of the Privy Council. In fact, though this was the high point of Bilson's career as courtier, and secured by Somerset's influence, he had been led to expect more earlier that summer. Somerset had been importunate to the point of pushiness on behalf of Bilson, hoping to secure him a higher office, and had left Bilson in a false position and James very annoyed. This misjudgement was a major step in Somerset's replacement in favour by George Villiers, said to have happened in physical terms under Bilson's roof at Farnham Castle that same August.

== Death and burial ==
In 1616 John Dunbar published a book of Latin Epigrams, Epigrammaton Ioannis Dunbari Megalo-Britanni, one of which is addressed to Thomas Bilson, Bishop of Winchester:

"Castalidum commune decus, dignissime praesul
Bilsoni, æternis commemorande modis:
Quam valide adversus Christi imperterritus hostes
Bella geras, libri sunt monumenta tui:
His Hydræ fidei quotquot capita alta resurgunt,
Tu novus Alcides tot resecare soles."

(Shared ornament of the Muses, prelate most worthy,
Bilson, to be renowned in ageless strains:
How steadfastly against the foes of Christ
You battle, fearless, your books do testify:
So many of Faith's Hydra's-heads that rise,
With these our new Alcides cuts them down.)

Bilson died in 1616 and was buried in Westminster Abbey at the entrance to St Edmund's Chapel. He is buried in plot 232 between the tombs of Richard II and Edward III. The position of the grave is now marked by a plain brass plate. This replaces the original inscribed plate which was removed to a position on the floor against the wall between the tombs of Richard II and Edward III for its preservation. The inscription reads as follows:

MEMORIAE SACRVM / HIC IACET THOMAS BILSON WINTONIENSIS NVPER EPISCOPVS / ET SERENISSIMO PRINCIPI IACOBO MAGNAE BRITTANIAE REGI /POTENTISSIMO A SANCTIORIBVS CONSILIJS QVI QVVM DEO ET / ECCLESIAE AD ANNOS VNDE VIGINTI FIDELITER IN EPISCO / PATV DESERVISSET MORTALITATE SUB CERTA SPE RESVRRECTI: /ONIS EXVIT DECIMO OCTAVO DIE MENSIS IVNIJ ANO DOMINI /M.DC XVI. AETATIS SVAE LXIX.

Here lies Thomas Bilson formerly bishop of Winchester and counsellor in sacred matters of his serene highness King James of Great Britain who when he had served God and the church for nineteen years in the bishopric laid aside mortality in certain hope of resurrection 18 June 1616 aged 69.

Bilson left no will, but administration of his affairs was granted to his widow Anne (died 1643, daughter of Thomas Mill or Mylles of Nursling, Hampshire, Recorder of Southampton and MP (died 1566), by his wife Alice Coker of Mappowder). His inquisition post mortem refers to properties in Hampshire and Sussex. There were two children,

- (Sir) Thomas Bilson (born 1591), MP for Winchester, who married Susanna Uvedale, daughter of William Uvedale of Wickham, MP (1528–1569). Sir Thomas died c. 1647, but his will was not proved until 1661. Issue.
- Amy Bilson (born 1593), who married Sir Richard Norton, 1st Baronet (1582–1646), MP for Petersfield. Issue.

== Legacy ==
It was said of Bilson, that he "carried prelature in his very aspect." Anthony à Wood declared him to be so "complete in divinity, so well skilled in languages, so read in the Fathers and Schoolmen, so judicious is making use of his readings, that at length he was found to be no longer a soldier, but a commander in chief in the spiritual warfare, especially when he became a bishop." Bilson is also remembered for being hawkish against recusant Roman Catholics. Henry Parker drew on both Bilson and Richard Hooker in his pamphlet writing around the time of English Civil War, and Wood observed that the arguments towards disobedience in The True Difference, while they may have served Elizabeth, "did contribute much to the ruin of her successor King Charles I."

Bilson had argued for resistance to a Roman Catholic prince. A century later, Richard Baxter drew on Bilson in proposing and justifying the deposition of James II. What Bilson had envisaged in 1585 was a "wild" scenario or counterfactual, a Roman Catholic monarch of England: its relevance to practical politics came much later.

=== Writings ===
His writings took a nuanced and middle way in ecclesiastical polity, and avoided Erastian views and divine right, while requiring passive obedience to authority depending on the context. His efforts to avoid condemning Huguenot and Dutch Protestant resisters have been described as "contortions". His works included:

- The True Difference Betweene Christian Subjection and Unchristian Rebellion (1585)
- The Perpetual Government Of Christ's Church (1593)
- Survey of Christ's Sufferings for Man's Redemption and of His Descent to Hades Or Hell for Our Deliverance (1604) against the Brownist Henry Jacob

Church of England titles
Preceded by Richard Fletcher	Bishop of Worcester; 1596–1597	Succeeded by Gervase Babington
Preceded by William Day	Bishop of Winchester; 1597–1616	Succeeded by James Montague
