= John Jortin =

English church historian (1698–1770)

John Jortin (23 October 1698 – 5 September 1770) was an English church historian.

== Life ==
Jortin was the son of Renatus Jordain, a Breton Huguenot refugee and government official, and Martha Rogers, daughter of Daniel Rogers. He was educated at Charterhouse School, and in 1715 became a pensioner of Jesus College, Cambridge, where he became a Fellow in 1721. He was Rede lecturer at Cambridge in 1724, and Boyle lecturer in 1749. A churchman, he held various benefices, becoming in 1764 Archdeacon of London.

== Works ==
Jortin briefly (1731–2) established a magazine, Miscellaneous Observations upon Authors, Ancient and Modern, in which he wrote on Spenser and Milton. In 1722, he published a small volume of Latin verse entitled Lusus poetici. Discourses Concerning the Truth of the Christian Religion (1746) was a work of Christian apologetics. His Remarks on Ecclesiastical History (5 vols, 1751‑73), has been labelled "the most significant Anglican ecclesiastical history of the eighteenth century"; written "from a markedly latitudinarian perspective", it was respected by Gibbon.

Jortin mostly avoided controversy, though a dissertation on Virgil's treatment of the dead, by conflicting with Warburton's treatment, drew attack from Warburton's disciple Richard Hurd. A two-volume Life of Erasmus (1758, 1760) drew upon Jean Le Clerc: "Jortin was in many ways a late representative of Christian humanism, as well as an active citizen in the protestant republic of letters". Jortin published other miscellaneous pamphlets and tracts, and seven volumes of sermons appeared after his death. All his works showed learning, and were written in a lively style.

A collection of three volumes of his works was printed in 1805 and can be found at Internet Archive:

- Discourses Concerning the Truth of the Christian Religion and Remarks on Ecclesiastical History, Volume 1
- Discourses Concerning the Truth of the Christian Religion and Remarks on Ecclesiastical History, Volume 2
- Discourses Concerning the Truth of the Christian Religion and Remarks on Ecclesiastical History, Volume 3
