= Francis Aldrich =

Francis Aldrich, D.D. was an academic in the late sixteenth and early seventeenth centuries.

Aldrich was educated at Clare Hall, Cambridge. He was one of the original Fellows of Sidney Sussex College, Cambridge and its Master from April 1608 until his death on 27 December 1609.

== Life ==
Francis Aldrich was born in 1561 and attended Cambridge University, where he later became a fellow of St. John's College. He was known for his proficiency in languages, particularly Greek, and was appointed as the University's Public Orator in 1597, a position he held for over 20 years.

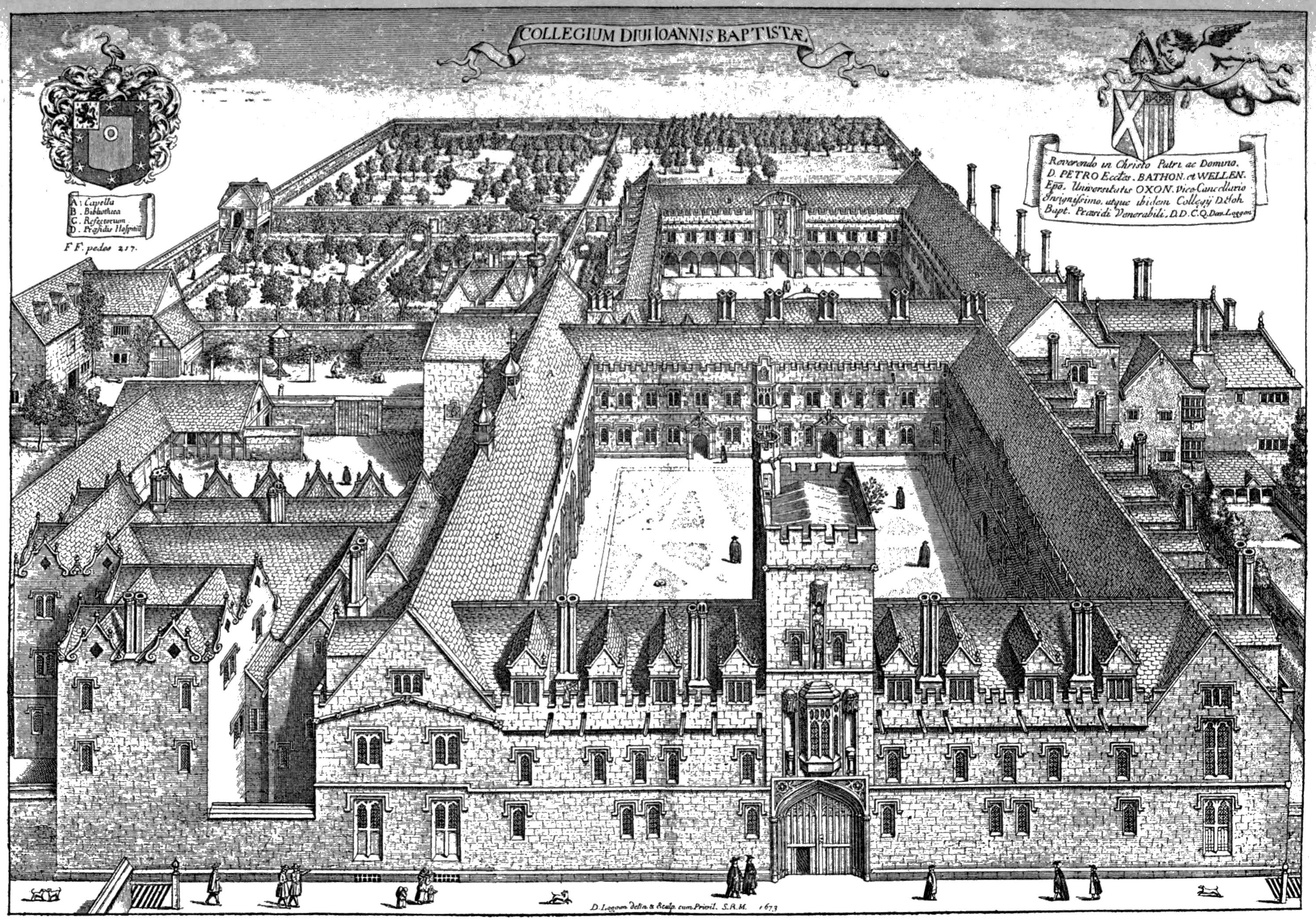
Oxford University building

In addition to his academic pursuits, Aldrich was also involved in the Church of England and was appointed as a chaplain to King James I in 1603. He later became the Dean of Christ Church Cathedral in Oxford and was a prominent member of the English clergy during his time.

Aldrich died in 1640, leaving behind a legacy as a distinguished scholar and churchman
