= John Knewstub =

English clergyman

John Knewstub (or Knewstubs) (1544–29 May 1624) was an English clergyman and one of the participants in the Hampton Court Conference of 1604 representing the Puritan side. Patrick Collinson calls him presbyterian by conviction, but moderate in his views.

== Life ==
He was born at Kirkby Stephen in Westmoreland in 1544 and was educated at Sedbergh School, Thereafter, he entered St. John's College, Cambridge, where he graduated B.A. 1564, and, on 21 March 1567, was elected a Fellow. In 1568, he proceeded M.A. and, in 1576, took his degree as B.D.

He became noted as a controversialist, particularly as a writer against the teaching of Henry Nicholis and the Family of Love. In 1576, he preached against their doctrines at Paul's Cross. On 13 August 1579, he was presented by Sir William Spring to the rectory of Cockfield, Suffolk, in succession to Richard Longworth, and continued to hold the living for the rest of his life.

Under the patronage of the Spring family, Cockfield became a centre of Puritan doctrine. In May 1582, an assembly of about 60 clergymen from Norfolk, Suffolk, and Cambridgeshire met in Cockfield Church to confer about the Prayer Book, clerical dress, and customs. St. John's College also was, at that time, noted for its leanings to Puritanism; Knewstub was a follower of Thomas Cartwright and a friend of Adam Winthrop, John Winthrop's father.

Knewstub was a strong candidate in 1595 to succeed William Whitaker as Master of St John's, though Richard Clayton was elected. At the conference in Hampton Court in 1604, he appeared as one of the four ministers deputed to oppose conformity. He took especial exception to the use of the sign of the cross in baptism and also to the surplice.

== Death and will ==
Knewstub died at Cockfield, where he was buried 31 May 1624. His epitaph, which has disappeared from his place of interment, has been preserved by Francis Peck. He was not married, Richard Rogers remarking that he had been content with a solitary life. He made bequests to a number of clergymen who had been his friends often for many years. These included Henry Sandes, who was living with Adam Winthrop in Groton, Humphrey Munning of Brettenham, Thomas Chambers of Assington, Mr Peachie, Great Waldingfield and Mr Chamberlin of Hunston.

== Works ==
The Evangelium Regni of Henry Nicholis, composed originally in German, had been translated into Latin and, in 1579, Knewstub translated a large portion of the Latin version into English, with comments in which he unsparingly denounced the tenets advanced. The work was dedicated to Ambrose Dudley, 3rd Earl of Warwick, and the contents of the volume show that Knewstub was, by this time, well known at court. His Lectures … upon the twentieth Chapter of Exodus of 1577 had been dedicated to Dudley’s wife Anne.
