= William Bradshaw (Puritan) =

English Puritan (1571–1618)

William Bradshaw (1571–1618) was a moderate English Puritan, born in Market Bosworth.

He was educated at Ashby-de-la-Zouch, where he met both Anthony Gilby, and his future patron Arthur Hildersham, and at Emmanuel College, Cambridge. He became a Fellow of Sidney Sussex College, Cambridge in 1599, but left Cambridge in 1601. A friend from Sidney Sussex was Thomas Gataker, and they later wrote together (A Plain and Pithy Exposition of the Second Epistle to the Thessalonians, 1620).

He became a Puritan controversialist in many areas.

== Works ==
He was the author of English Puritanisme containeung [sic] the maine opinions of the rigidest of those called Puritanes in the realme of England, which was first published in 1605, and prefaced by William Ames in 1610. Also in 1605, he published Twelve general arguments, proving that the ceremonies imposed upon the ministers of the Gospel in England, by our prelates, are unlawful; ....

== Views ==
The main point of his system was that he would subject no congregation to any ecclesiastical jurisdiction "save that which is within itself." He would have the members delegate their powers to pastors and elders, retaining that of excommunication. No clergyman should hold civil office. He was strongly opposed to "ceremonies."

He was not a separatist and held that the king as "the archbishop and general overseer of all the churches within his dominions" had the right to rule and must not be resisted except passively. He published many other works and tracts, most of them anonymously.
