= Jortin Forbes House =

- U.S. National Register of Historic Places
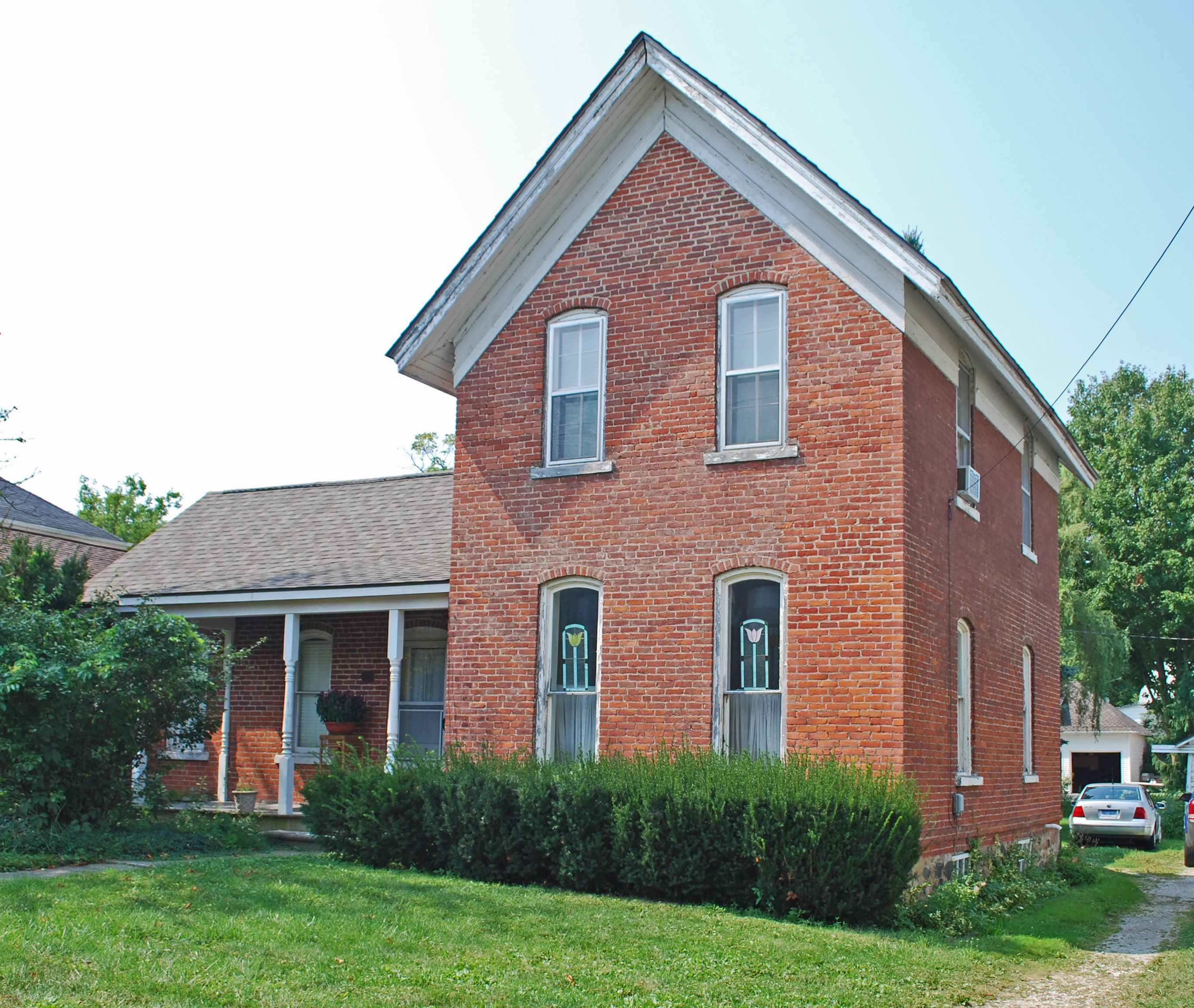
- Interactive map
- Location: 211 N. Ann Arbor St., Saline, Michigan
- Coordinates: 42°10′05″N 83°46′57″W
- Area: less than one acre
- Built: 1860
- Architectural style: Stick/eastlake
- MPS: Saline MRA
- NRHP reference No.: 85002954
- Added to NRHP: October 10, 1985

The Jortin Forbes House is a single-family home located at 211 North Ann Arbor Street in Saline, Michigan. It was listed on the National Register of Historic Places in 1985.

== History ==
This house was built by Orange Risdon prior to 1856, and possibly as early as the 1840s. Although this house has been historically known as the Jortin Forbes House, there is no evidence that he ever lived there, and in fact likely lived next door in the house at 209 North Ann Arbor. Jortin Forbes was active in village life, serving as street commissioner in 1866-67, inspector for the first Village election in 1866, Marshal in 1866-67, and Justice of the Peace in 1878. His wife Matilda Forbes owned a milliner shop. Blacksmith Henry Johnson lived here in the 1860s, and later owners were Orrin Parsons, Sarah Schleh and Sarah Ennis.

== Description ==
The Jortin Forbes House is a vernacular two-story brick Stick/eastlake style Upright and Wing house. The structure sits on a small lot. It has a two-story upright section and a one-story wing to one side, both gabled. It has a wide frieze topped with a raking cornice without returns. The windows are in segmental-arched head openings. The front features a hipped roof front porch, with spindled balusters and decorative brackets, which is probably a later addition. A single-story addition on the rear of the house was probably built about 1881.
