= Daniel Rogers (Puritan) =

English nonconforming clergyman and religious writer

Daniel Rogers (1573–1652) was an English nonconforming clergyman and religious writer. He is now best known for his conduct book Matrimoniall Honour.

== Life ==
He was the eldest son of Richard Rogers of Wethersfield, Essex, by his first wife, and was born there. Ezekiel Rogers was his younger brother. He proceeded to Christ's College, Cambridge, where he was taught by William Perkins. He graduated B.A. in 1595–6, and M.A. in 1599, and was fellow from 1600 to 1608.

On leaving the university Rogers officiated as minister at Haversham, Buckinghamshire, but when Stephen Marshall, his father's successor at Wethersfield, moved to Finchingfield, Rogers returned to Wethersfield as lecturer, with Daniel Weld or Weald, another puritan, as vicar. He had several personal discussions with William Laud, who paid tribute to his scholarship, but, after being harassed for various acts of nonconformity, he was suspended by the archbishop in 1629. Conforming clergy in North Essex presented a memorial to the bishop on his behalf, but he apparently left Essex for a time.

The latter part of Rogers's life was passed at Wethersfield., where he had for neighbour as vicar of Shalford his relative, Giles Firmin, a royalist in politics. On the fast day proclaimed after the execution of Charles I, Rogers went home with Firmin and "bemoaned the king's death". When the army's petition for tolerance, called 'the agreement of the people,' was sent down for the Essex ministers to sign, Rogers, on behalf of the presbyterians, drew up, and was the first to sign, the Essex Watchmen's Watchword, London, 1649, protesting against the toleration of any who refused to sign the Solemn League and Covenant.

Rogers died on 16 September 1652, aged 80. He was buried at Wethersfield. Rogers was a ‘Calvinist’ and scrupulous about his spiritual state. Firmin's Real Christian was mainly written to counteract his fastidiousness. Rogers's stepbrother, John Ward, said of him that, although he "had grace enough for two men, he had not enough for himself."

== Works ==
Several of Rogers's works are dedicated to Robert Rich, 2nd Earl of Warwick, and to his countess Susanna, at whose house at Leez Priory he was often welcomed. Their titles are:

- David's Cost, wherein every one who is desirous to serve God aright may see what it must cost him, enlarged from a sermon, London, 1619.
- A Practicall Catechisme, &c.; 2nd ed. corrected and enlarged, London, 1633, published under the author's initials; 3rd ed. London, 1640; in 1648 appeared Collections or Brief Notes gathered out of Mr. Daniel Rogers' Practical Catechism by R. P.
- A Treatise of the Two Sacraments of the Gospel, &c., by D.R.; 3rd ed. London, 1635, dedicated to Lady Barrington of Hatfield Broad Oak, Essex.
- Matrimoniall Honour, or the mutuall crowne and comfort of godly, loyall, and chaste marriage, London, 1642.
- Naaman the Syrian, his Disease and Cure, London, 1642.; Rogers's longest work, consisting of 898 pages folio.

== Family ==
Rogers's first wife was Margaret Bishop. His second wife, Sarah, was daughter of John Edward of London. A daughter married William Jenkyn. His son by his first wife, Daniel, was minister of Haversham, Buckinghamshire, from 5 October 1665 until his death, 5 June 1680; Daniel's daughter, Martha Rogers, was mother of John Jortin.
