= Richard Rogers (theologian) =

English clergyman (d. 1618)

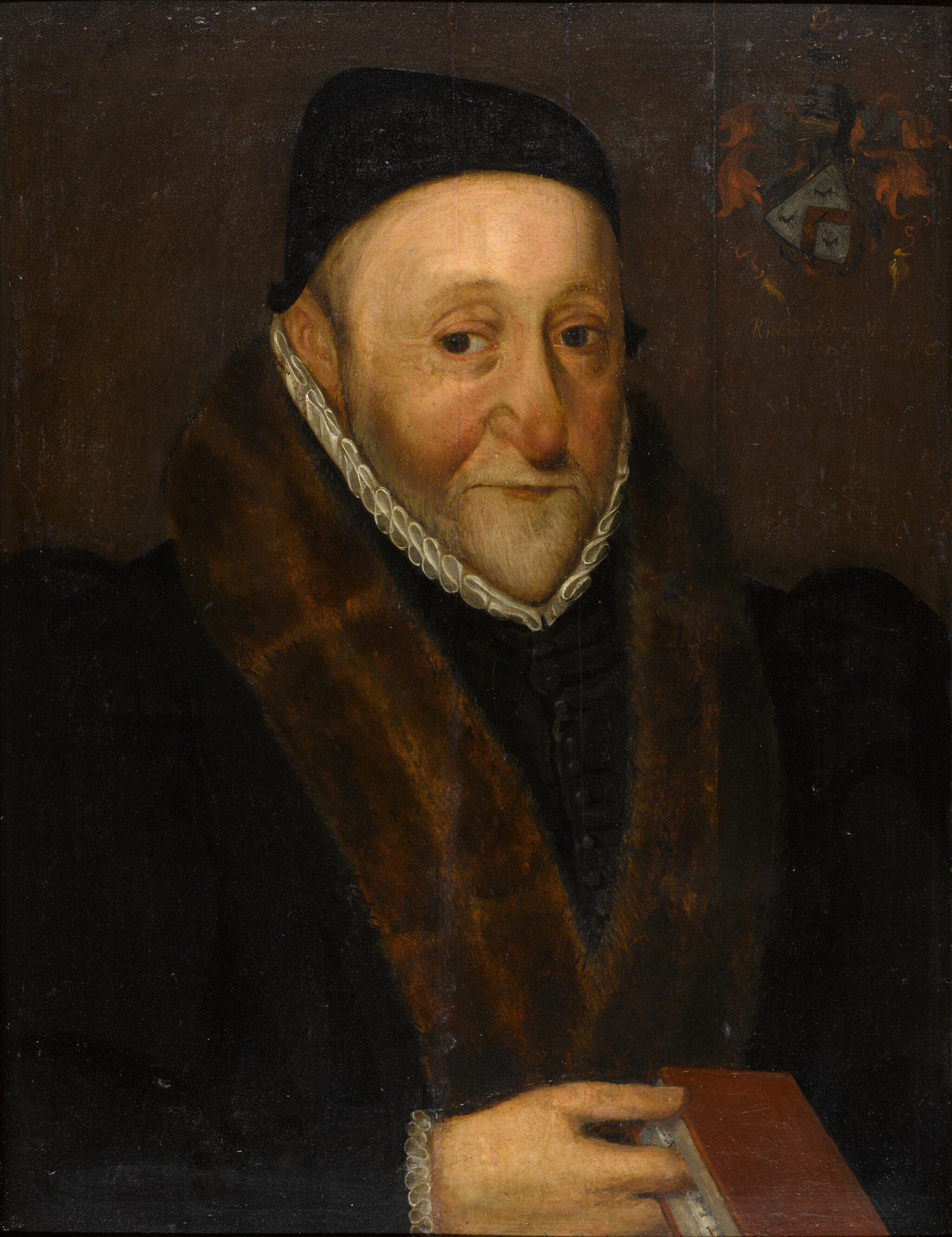
Richard Rogers, Vicar of Wethersfield, Essex

Richard Rogers (1550?–1618) was an English clergyman, a nonconformist under both Elizabeth I and James I.

== Life ==
He was born in 1550 or 1551 to John Rogers (died 1558) and Agnes Carter (1500–1559). Family tradition in the 17th century claimed that he was the son or grandson of the steward to the earls of Warwick, but since there was no Earl of Warwick during that time, genealogists have disproved this claim. He matriculated as a sizar of Christ's College, Cambridge, in November 1565, and graduated B.A. 1571, M.A. 1574. He was appointed lecturer at Wethersfield, Essex, about 1577.

In 1583 he, with twenty-six others, petitioned the privy council against Archbishop John Whitgift's three articles, and against Bishop Aylmer's proceedings on them at his visitation. Whitgift suspended all the petitioners. After a suspension of eight months Rogers resumed his preaching, and was restored to his ministry through the intervention of Sir Robert Wroth.

Rogers espoused the presbyterian movement under Thomas Cartwright, and signed the Book of Discipline. He is mentioned by Richard Bancroft as one of a classis round Braintree side, together with Culverwell, Gifford, and others. In 1598 and 1603 he was accordingly again in trouble; on the former occasion before the ecclesiastical commission, and on the latter for refusing the oath ex officio. He owed his restoration to the influence of William Knollys, 1st Earl of Banbury. Under the episcopate of Richard Vaughan, bishop of London between 1604 and 1607, he enjoyed considerable freedom; but under Vaughan's successor, Thomas Ravis, he was again in trouble.

Rogers died at Wethersfield on 68 April 1618, and was buried in the churchyard. Rogers was the father of Daniel Rogers and Ezekiel Rogers. He was succeeded at Wethersfield by Stephen Marshall.

== Works ==
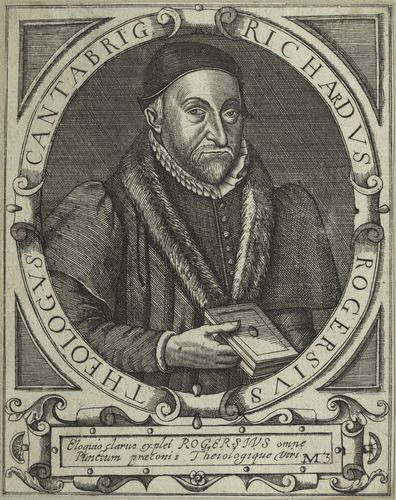
Richard Rogers, engraving from 1650.

Rogers wrote:

- Seaven treatises containing such directions as is gathered out of the Holie Scriptures, 1603; 2nd edit. London, 1605, dedicated to King James; 4th edit. 1627, 2 parts; 5th edit. 1630. An abbreviated version, called The Practice of Christianity, is dated 1618, and was often reissued. This was an early Puritan work addressing the Christian life. The introduction mentions the Christian Directory of Robert Persons, and the Exercise of a Christian Life by Gaspar Loarte, offering the book as a Protestant alternative.
- A garden of spirituall flowers, planted by R[ichard] R[ogers], W[ill] P[erkins], R[ichard] G[reenham], M. M., and G[eorge] W[ebbe], London, 1612, 1622, 1632, 1643 (2 parts), 1687 (2 parts).
- Certaine Sermons, directly tending to these three ends, First, to bring any bad person (that hath not committed the same that is unpardonable) to true conversion; secondly, to establish and settle all such as are converted in faith and repentance; thirdly, to leade them forward (that are so settled) in the Christian life . . . whereunto are annexed divers . . . sermons of Samuel Wright, B.D., London, 1612.
- A Commentary upon the whole book of Judges, preached first and delivered in sundrie lectures, London, 1615, dedicated to Sir Edward Coke.
- Samuel's encounter with Saul, 1 Sam. chap. xv, London, 1620.
