= Hampton Court Conference =

Conference between Anglicans and Puritans in 1604

The Hampton Court Conference was held in England in 1604, between King James I and members of the Church of England and the Puritan group. The conference resulted in the 1604 Book of Common Prayer and, in 1611, the King James Version of the Bible.

== Attendance ==
=== Background ===
The conference was called in response to a series of requests for reform set down in the Millenary Petition, a document which contained the signatures of 1000 Puritan ministers. The signatories included Henry Robinson, Anthony Watson, Tobias Matthew, Thomas Dove, Anthony Rudd, Thomas Bilson, Gervase Babington, Deans Lancelot Andrewes, John Overall, James Montague, William Barlow, Giles Tomson and Thomas Ravis as well as John Rainolds (sometimes written as Reynolds), the president of Corpus Christi College, Oxford.

While the meeting was originally scheduled for November 1603, an outbreak of plague meant it was postponed until January and moved to Hampton Court Palace.

There were three meetings over a period of five days.

Nine bishops and seven deans attended the meetings, including John Whitfit, Richard Bancroft (1544-1610) and Lancelot Andrewes (1555-1626).

The bishops choose four moderate Puritans to attend the meetings - they were John Rainolds, Laurence Chaderton, Thomas Sparke and John Knewstubs.

=== First meeting ===
The conference started on 14 January at the King’s Privy Chamber on the first floor of the palace. James met with the bishops to discuss some of the Puritan complaints detailed in the Millenary Petition, particularly the complaints about the Catholic terms Absolution and Confirmation. The King, after ending his talks with the bishops, claimed he was "well satisfied", and declared that "the manner might be changed and some things cleared". Private baptism, especially when administered by women, would prove to be a more intense argument between James and his bishops, but James eventually persuaded them that only ministers should administer baptisms.

=== Second meeting ===
The second day of the conference (16 January) was a joint meeting of James, the bishops and the Puritans - James started the meeting by rebuking the Puritans and immediately rejecting their requests for liturgical changes.

James then turned his attention to ecclesiastical discipline. Excommunication for "trifles and twelvepenny matters" was to be abolished, and the often hasty trial policies of the commissaries' court were to be reviewed and amended by the Lord Chancellor and Lord Chief Justice. For the Puritan complaint that punishment should be enforced by Christ's own institution, James held the view that bishops should not exercise ecclesiastical discipline solely, though he did not speak of any specific method that he would use to remedy this.

John Rainolds then raised the subject of creating a new translation of the Bible, rather than continuing the use of the Geneva Bible; this was agreed by James.

=== Third meeting ===
The final meeting was held on 18 January; James spoke on what the conference had decided, including some small changes to the Book of Common Prayer, a ruling that baptism could only be carried out by ordained ministers, and an agreement to create a new English translation of the Bible.

All in all, James was pleased, and had good reason to be. With the first meeting, not only had he eloquently reached agreements on many of the Puritan demands, he also avoided any major arguments.

== Aftermath ==
The conference reinforced the authority of the King of England over the Church of England.

Soon after the conference, Archbishop John Whitgift died and the anti-Puritan Richard Bancroft, who had argued against the Puritans at Hampton Court, was appointed to the See of Canterbury, and the King's fears led to demands that Puritan ministers adhere to each of the Thirty-Nine Articles.

However, the Hampton Court Conference also bore fruit for the Puritans, who, led by Rainolds, insisted that man know God's word without intermediaries, as it led to James's commissioning of that translation of the Christian Bible into the English vernacular, which would be known as the Authorised Version because it alone was authorised to be read in Churches. It is now commonly described as the King James Version. Crucially, the King broadened a base of support, which under his predecessor Elizabeth I had been narrowed through harsh anti-Catholic laws, through his moderate and inclusive approach to the problems of English religion; while alienating the more extreme Puritan and Catholic elements of English Christianity.

In the following years, tensions between the government and the Puritans continued; in 1620 a small group of Puritans decided to leave England for a new life, and they set sail for North America on board the Mayflower.

== See also ==
- Gunpowder Plot
- Savoy Conference
