= Millenary Petition =

List of requests given to James I by Puritans in 1603

The Millenary Petition was a list of requests given to James I by Puritans in 1603 when he was travelling to London in order to claim the English throne. The carefully worded document expressed Puritan distaste regarding the state of the Church of England, and took into consideration James' religious views as well as his liking for a debate, as written in Basilikon Doron. It was claimed, but not proven, that the petition had 1,000 signatures of Puritan ministers. The petition is referred to as it is, as a reference to the purported mille, meaning 1,000, signers.

While many of the main Puritan goals were rebutted, the petition did culminate in the Hampton Court Conference, which eventually led James to authorize the 1604 minor revision of the Book of Common Prayer. The most substantial outcome of the conference was the commission of a new English translation of the Bible, now known as the King James Version.

== Context and formulation ==
In a time where it was unwise to criticise the king directly, there was no hint of dissatisfaction with the royal supremacy in the petition. The Puritan reformers stressed throughout that they were not separatists or schismatics. The document expressed much of the general Puritan feeling regarding the Church; namely, that the English Reformation had not gone far enough to purge the Church of England from all perceived errors of the Catholic Church.

The Puritan party hoped to capitalize James's previous station as the King of Scotland, where he had administered the mostly Presbyterian Scots of the Church of Scotland. Among the most significant grievances leveled by the Puritans were their opposition to ritualism.

== The demands ==
The Puritans rejected the following ceremonies:

- The signing of the cross during baptism
- Confirmation
- The administration of baptism by lay people (It was common in some areas that mid-wives would baptize children.)
- Use of the ring in marriage
- Bowing at the name of Jesus
- The requirement of the surplice and cap
- The practice of giving men multiple ecclesiastical positions, receiving pay for each

They also disliked the terms Priest and Absolution (terms they perceived as Roman Catholic). They wanted a stricter observance of the Sabbath, which was originally supported by James up until The Book of Sports. They claimed that ministers should only be both "able and sufficient men".

The Puritans also requested some changes to ecclesiastical discipline. First, they asked, in a rather ambiguous statement, that punishment only be enforced by Christ's own institution. Second, they claimed excommunication should not be imposed by lay officials. Third, they asked that men should not be excommunicated for "trifles and twelvepenny matters". Finally, they asked for better restraint in the use of ex officio oath.

== Text ==
The following was claimed as the full content by Thomas Fuller in his Church-History of 1655:

Most gracious and dread sovereign, Seeing it has pleased the Divine majesty, to the great comfort of all good Christians, to advance your highness, according to your just title, to the peaceable government of this Church and Commonwealth of England, we, the ministers of the gospel in this land, neither as factious men affecting a popular parity in the Church, nor as schismatics aiming at the dissolution of the State ecclesiastical, but as the faithful servants of Christ and loyal subjects to your majesty, desiring and longing for the redress of divers abuses of the Church, could do no less in our obedience to God, service to your majesty, love to His Church, than acquaint your princely majesty with our particular griefs; for as your princely pen writeth, 'the king, as a good physician, must first know what peccant humours his patient naturally is most subject unto, before he can begin his cure;' and although divers of us that sue for reformation have formerly, in respect of the times, subscribed to the book--some upon protestation, some upon exposition given them, some with condition rather than the Church should have been deprived of their labour and ministry--yet now we, to the number of more than a thousand of your majesty's subjects and ministers, all groaning as under a common burden of human rites and ceremonies, do with one joint consent humble ourselves at your majesty's feet, to be eased and relieved in this behalf. Our humble suit, then, unto your majesty is that these offences following, some may be removed, some amended, some qualified:

I. In the Church service: that the cross in baptism, interrogatories ministered to infants, confirmation, as superfluous, may be taken away; baptism not to be ministered by women, and so explained; the cap and surplice not urged; that examination may go before the communion; that it be ministered with a sermon; that divers terms of priests, and absolution, and some other used, with the ring in marriage, and other such like in the book, may be corrected; the longsomeness of service abridged, Church songs and music moderated to better edification; that the Lord's Day be not profaned; the rest upon holy days not so strictly urged; that there may be a uniformity of doctrine prescribed; no Roman Catholic opinion to be any more taught or defended; no ministers charged to teach their people to bow at the name of Jesus; that the canonical Scriptures only be read in the Church.

II. Concerning Church ministers: that none hereafter be admitted into the ministry but able and sufficient men, and those to preach diligently and especially upon the Lord's day; that such as be already entered and cannot preach, may either be removed, and some charitable course taken with them for their relief, or else be forced, according to the value of their livings, to maintain preachers; that non-residency be not permitted; that King Edward's statute for the lawfulness of ministers' marriages be revived; that ministers be not urged to subscribe, but according to the law, to the Articles of Religion, and the king's supremacy only.

III. For Church livings and maintenance: that bishops leave their commendams, some holding parsonages, some prebends, some vicarages, with their bishoprics; that double-beneficed men be not suffered to hold some two, some three benefices with cure, and some two, three, or four dignities besides; that impropriations annexed to bishoprics and colleges be demised only to the preachers incumbents, for the old rent; that the impropriations of laymen's fees be charged, with a sixth or seventh part of their worth, to the maintenance of the preaching minister.

IV. For Church discipline: that the discipline and excommunication may be administered according to Christ's own institution, or, at the least, that enormities may be redressed, as namely, that excommunication come not forth under the name of lay persons, chancellors, officials, &c.; that men be not excommunicated for trifles and twelve-penny matters; that none be excommunicated without consent of his pastor; that the officers be not suffered to extort unreasonable fees; that none having jurisdiction or registers' places, put out the same to farm; that divers Roman Catholic canons (as for restraint of marriage at certain times) be reversed; that the longsomeness of suits in ecclesiastical courts (which hang sometimes two, three, four, five, six, or seven years) may be restrained; that the oath Ex Officio, whereby men are forced to accuse themselves, be more sparingly used; that licences for marriages without banns asked, be more cautiously granted:

These, with such other abuses yet remaining and practised in the Church of England, we are able to show not to be agreeable to the Scriptures, if it shall please your highness further to hear us, or more at large by writing to be informed, or by conference among the learned to be resolved; and yet we doubt not but that, without any further process, your majesty (of whose Christian judgment we have received so good a taste already) is able of yourself to judge of the equity of this cause. God, we trust, has appointed your highness our physician to heal these diseases; and we say with Mordecai to Esther, 'Who knoweth whether you are come to the kingdom for such a time?' Thus your majesty shall do that which we are persuaded shall be acceptable to God, honourable to your majesty in all succeeding ages, profitable to His Church, which shall be thereby increased, comfortable to your ministers, which shall be no more suspended, silenced, disgraced, imprisoned for men's traditions, and prejudicial to none but to those that seek their own quiet, credit and profit in the world.

Thus, with all dutiful submission, referring ourselves to your majesty's pleasure for your gracious answer, as God shall direct you, we most humbly recommend your highness to the Divine majesty, whom we beseech, for Christ His sake, to dispose your royal heart to do herein what shall be to His glory, the good of His Church, and your endless comfort.

Your majesty's most humble subjects, the ministers of the Gospel that desire not a disorderly innovation, but a due and godly reformation.

== See also ==
- The Hampton Court Conference
- James I of England
- Anglicanism

== Sources and further reading ==
- Roger Lockyer, Tudor and Stuart Britain: 1485-1714, 2004. ISBN 0-582-77188-9.
