= List of Puritans =

The Puritans were originally members of a group of English Protestants seeking "purity", further reforms or even separation from the established church, during the Reformation. The group is also extended to include some early colonial American ministers and important lay-leaders. The majority of people in this list were mainstream Puritans, adhering strictly to the doctrine of Predestination.

== A ==
- Robert Abbot
- Joseph Alleine
- Richard Alleine
- Isaac Ambrose
- William Ames
- John Arrowsmith
- Simon Ashe

== B ==
- Stephen Bachiler
- Robert Baillie
- John Ball
- Henry Barrowe
- Richard Baxter
- Thomas Baylie
- Lewis Bayly
- Richard Bernard
- Robert Bolton
- Samuel Bolton
- John Bond
- Thomas Boston
- Theophilus Brabourne
- William Bradford
- William Bradshaw
- Anne Bradstreet
- Simon Bradstreet
- William Bridge
- John Brinsley the elder
- Thomas Brooks
- Hugh Broughton
- Robert Browne
- John Bunyan
- Peter Bulkley
- Anthony Burges
- Cornelius Burgess
- Jeremiah Burroughs
- Henry Burton
- Nicholas Byfield
- Richard Byfield

== C ==
- Edmund Calamy
- Richard Capel
- Thomas Carter
- Thomas Cartwright
- Joseph Caryl
- Thomas Case
- Daniel Cawdrey
- Thomas Cawton
- Laurence Chaderton
- William Chaderton
- Stephen Charnock
- Francis Cheynell
- Thomas Coleman
- Edward Corbet
- John Cotton
- Miles Coverdale
- Oliver Cromwell
- John Cutt

== D ==
- Thomas Danforth
- John Darrell
- John Davenport
- Arthur Dent
- John Dod
- Philip Doddridge
- Thomas Doolittle
- John Downame
- Calybute Downing
- Thomas Dudley
- John Dury

== E ==
- Theophilus Eaton
- Jonathan Edwards
- Stephen Egerrton

== F ==
- Humphrey Fenn
- John Field
- William Fiennes, 1st Viscount Saye and Sele
- John Flavel
- John Foxe
- William Fulke

== G ==
- Thomas Gataker
- Anthony Gilby
- George Gillespie
- Bernard Gilpin
- Christopher Goodman
- Thomas Goodwin
- William Gouge
- Andrew Gray
- Richard Greenham
- William Greenhill
- John Greenwood
- William Guthrie
- William Gurnall

== H ==
- Edward Hake
- Robert Harris
- John Harvard
- Henry Hastings, 3rd Earl of Huntingdon
- Thomas Hastings
- Alexander Henderson
- Matthew Henry
- Philip Henry
- Charles Herle
- Richard Heyrick
- Francis Higginson
- Arthur Hildersham
- Robert Hill
- Thomas Hooker
- John Howe
- Joshua Hoyle
- Laurence Humphrey
- Christopher Hussey
- Anne Hutchinson

== I ==
- Henry Ireton

== J ==
- James Janeway
- Francis Johnson

== L ==
- John Lathrop
- Edward Leigh
- Alexander Leighton
- John Ley
- John Lightfoot
- Morgan Llwyd
- Israel Loring
- Christopher Love

== M ==
- Thomas Manton
- Francis Marbury
- Stephen Marshall
- Walter Marshall
- Richard Martyn
- Cotton Mather
- Increase Mather
- Richard Mather
- John Maynard
- John Mayo
- Joseph Mede
- Walter Mildmay
- John Milton
- John More

== N ==
- Matthew Newcomen
- John Norton
- Nicholas Noyes
- Philip Nye

== O ==
- John Owen

== P ==
- Herbert Palmer
- Robert Parker
- Thomas Parker
- John Penry
- William Perkins
- Andrew Perne
- William Phelps
- George Phillips
- Matthew Poole
- John Preston

== R ==
- John Rainolds
- Mary Rowlandson
- Edward Reynolds
- Edmund Rice
- Robert Rich, 2nd Earl of Warwick
- John Robinson
- John Rogers
- John Russell
- Samuel Rutherford

== S ==
- Thomas Sampson
- Henry Scudder
- Lazarus Seaman
- Obadiah Sedgwick
- Jeremiah Shepard
- Thomas Shepard
- Richard Sibbes
- Sidrach Simpson
- Peter Smart
- William Spurstowe
- Edmund Staunton
- Nathaniel Stephens
- Peter Sterry
- Solomon Stoddard
- Samuel Stone
- Elder John Strong

== T ==
- Edward Taylor
- Thomas Taylor
- James Temple
- Robert Titus
- Walter Travers
- Thomas Tregosse
- William Twisse

== U ==
- John Udal
- Nicholas Upsall

== V ==
- Ralph Venning
- Richard Vines
- Thomas Vincent

== W ==
- Richard Waldron
- George Walker
- Nehemiah Wallington
- John Wallis
- Nathaniel Ward
- Samuel Ward (minister)
- Samuel Ward (scholar)
- Thomas Watson
- Isaac Watts
- Thomas Wellman
- Paul Wentworth
- Peter Wentworth
- John Wheelwright
- Jeremiah Whitaker
- John White
- David Whitehead
- William Whittingham
- Giles Wigginton
- Michael Wigglesworth
- John Wilson
- John Winthrop
- Daniel Williams
- Roger Williams
- George Wither
- John Woodbridge
- Benjamin Woodbridge
- Robert Woodford

== Y ==
- Patrick Young

== See also ==
- List of Puritan poets

== Sources ==
- Lives of the Puritans by Benjamin Brook and Daniel Neal's History of the Puritans
- Anderson, Robert Charles, The Great Migration Begins, Immigrants to New England, 1620-1640 (multi-vol series), Boston: New Historic Genealogical Society, 1995.
- Beeke, Joel, and Randall Pederson, Meet the Puritans: With a Guide to Modern Reprints, (Reformation Heritage Books, 2006) ISBN 978-1-60178-000-3
- Cross, Claire, The Puritan Earl, The Life of Henry Hastings, Third Earl of Huntingdon, 1536-1595, New York: St. Martin's Press, 1966.
- Fischer, David Hackett, Albion's Seed, Four British Folkways in America, New York: Oxford University Press, 1989.
- Morison, Samuel Eliot, Builders of the Bay Colony, Boston: Northeastern University Press, 1930 (1981 reprint).
- Powell, Sumner Chilton, Puritan Village, The Formation of a New England Town, Middletown: Wesleyan University Press, 1963.
- Stavely, Keith W.F., Puritan Legacies, Paradise Lost and the New England Tradition, 1630-1890, Ithaca: Cornell University Press, 1987.
