= List of members of the Westminster Assembly =

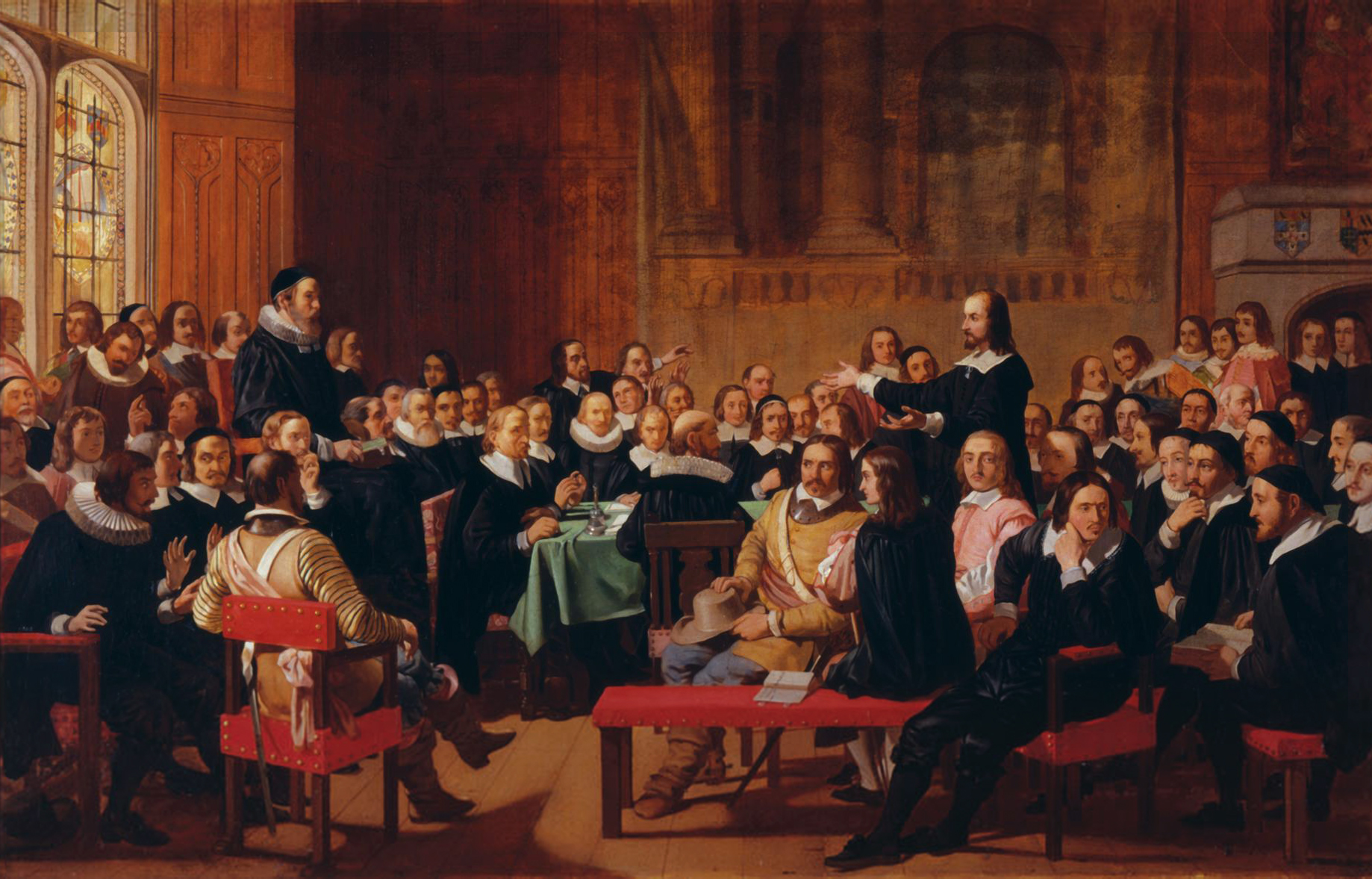
The Assertion of Liberty of Conscience By the Independents at the Westminster Assembly of Divines. Painted by John Rogers Herbert, R.A. (1810-1890)

The members of the Westminster Assembly of Divines, sometimes known collectively as the Westminster Divines, are those clergymen who participated in the Assembly that drafted the Westminster Confession of Faith. The Long Parliament's initial ordinance creating the Westminster Assembly appointed 121 ministers of the Church of England to the Assembly, as well as providing for participation on the part of 30 lay assessors (10 nobles and 20 commoners), as well as six Commissioners representing the Church of Scotland. Of the original 121 divines, approximately 25 never took their seats in the Assembly. The Parliament subsequently added 21 additional ministers to the Assembly (the additions being known to history as the Superadded Divines) to replace those ministers who did not attend, or who had died or become ill since the calling of the Assembly.

Note: In the list below, members of the Assembly without dates beside their names are mainly Royalists who did not take their seats in the Assembly because King Charles I instructed all loyal subjects not to participate in the Westminster Assembly.

== Divines ==
Members of the clergy (English and Welsh) (in alphabetical order)
Dates of participation	Name	Town	County	Notes
1643–1649	John Arrowsmith, D. D. (1602–1659)	King's Lynn	Norfolk	Master of St John's College, Cambridge from 1644
1643–1649	Simeon Ashe (d. 1662)		Cardiganshire	
1643–1649	Theodore Bathurst (c.1587–1651)	Overton Wetsville	Huntingdonshire	
1643–1649	Thomas Baylie, B. D. (1581/2–1663)	Manningford Bruce	Wiltshire	
1647–1649	Samuel Bolton (1605/6–1654)		Middlesex	
1644–1652	John Bond (1612–1676)		Oxford University	
1643–1644	Oliver Bowles, B. D. (c.1577–1644)	Sutton (near Biggleswade)	Bedfordshire	
1643–1649	William Bridge (1600/01–1671)	Yarmouth	Cumberland	
	Ralph Brownrigg, D. D. (1592–1659)		Cambridge University	Bishop of Exeter
	Richard Buckley (c.1608–1653)		Anglesey	
1643–1649	Anthony Burges (d. 1664)	Sutton Coldfield	Warwickshire	
1643–1649	Cornelius Burges, D. D. (d. 1665)	Watford	Hertfordshire	
1643–1646	Jeremiah Burroughs (bap. 1601?, d. 1646)	Stepney	Middlesex	
1643–1652	Adoniram Byfield (d. 1660)			non-voting scribe
1645–1649	Richard Byfield (bap. 1598, d. 1664)		Surrey	
1643–1649	Edward Calamy, B. D. (1600–1666)		London	
	Richard Capel (1586–1656)	Pitchcombe	Gloucestershire	
1643–1645/6	John Carter (d. 1645/6)		Yorkshire	
1643–1652	Thomas Carter (b. c.1585)		Oxford	
1643–1652	William Carter (1605–1658)	Dynton	Northumberland	
1643–1652	Joseph Caryl (1602–1673)		London	of Lincoln's Inn
1643–1649	Thomas Case (bap. 1598, d. 1682)		Cheshire	
1643–1649	Daniel Cawdrey (1587/8–1664)		Monmouthshire	
1643–1649	Humphrey Chambers (bap. 1599?, d. 1662)	Claverton	Somerset	
1643–1649	Francis Cheynell, D. D. (bap. 1608, d. 1665)	Petworth	Pembrokeshire	
1643–1649	Peter Clark (b. c.1606)	Carnaby	Yorkshire	
1643–1649	Richard Clayton (1597–1671)	Shawell	Leicestershire	
	Thomas Clendon (d. 1677)		Carmarthenshire	
	Francis Coke (c.1600–1682)	Yoxhall	Staffordshire	
1643–1646	Thomas Coleman (1597/8–1646)	Blyton	Lincolnshire	
1643–1652	John Conant, D. D. (1608–1694)	Lymington	Somerset	
1645–1649	Edward Corbet (b. 1590/91)		Westmorland	
1643–1652	Edward Corbet (1601x3–1658)		Shropshire	of Merton College, Oxford
1643–1649	Robert Crosse, B. D. (1604/5–1683)		Oxfordshire	of Lincoln College
1645–1649	Philippé Delmé (d. 1653)			
	Calybute Downing, D. D. (1606–1644)	Hackney	Middlesex	
	William Dunning (b. 1599)	Godalston		
1645–1652	John Dury (1596–1680)		Middlesex	
	John Earle (1598x1601–1665)	Bishopston	Bristol	became Bishop of Worcester in 1662 and was translated to the See of Salisbury 10 months later
	Edward Ellis, B. D. (b. c.1603, d. in or after 1650)	Gilsfield	Montgomeryshire	
1643	Daniel Featley, D. D. (1582–1645)		Surrey	of Lambeth
1645–1649	Thomas Ford (1598–1674)		Bedfordshire	
1643–1649	John Foxcraft (1595–1662)	Gotham	Nottinghamshire	
1643–1649	Hannibal Gammon (bap. 1582, d. 1650/51)	Maugan	Cornwall	
1643–1649	Thomas Gataker, B. D. (1574–1654)	Rotherhithe	Carnarvonshire	
1643–1649	John Gibbon (b. c.1587)	Waltham		
1643–1649	George Gibbs (c.1590–1654)	Aylestone	Leicestershire	
1643–1649	Samuel Gibson (b. c.1580)	Burley	Rutland	
1644–1649	William Good (b. 1600)			
1643–1649	Thomas Goodwin, D. D. (1600–1680)		Cambridgeshire	
1643–1649	William Gouge, D. D. (1575–1653)		Derbyshire	of Blackfriars
1643–1649	Stanley Gower (bap. 1600?, d. 1660)	Brampton Bryan	Herefordshire	
1643–1649?	John Greene (fl. 1641–1647)	Pencombe	Herefordshire	
1643–1649	William Greenhill (1597/8–1671)	Stepney	Durham	
	John Hacket, D. D. (1592–1670)		Radnorshire	of St. Andrew's London; Bishop of Lichfield and Coventry from 1661
1643–1644	Henry Hall, B. D. (c.1604–1644)	Norwich	Westmorland	
	Henry Hammond, D. D. (1605–1660)	Penshurst	Kent	
1644–1649	Humphrey Hardwick (b. 1602)			
	John Harris, D. D. (1587/8–1658)		Monmouthshire	Warden of Winchester College
1643–1652	Robert Harris, B. D. (1580/81–1658)	Hanwell	Oxfordshire	
1643–1649	Charles Herle (1597/8–1659)	Winwick	Lancashire	
1643–1649	Richard Heyrick (1600–1667)	Manchester	Lancashire	
1643–1649	Gaspar Hickes (1605–1677)	Lawrick	Cornwall	
	Samuel Hildersham (1594?–1674)	Fetton	Shropshire	
1643–1649	Thomas Hill, B. D. (d. 1653)	Tickmarsh	Northamptonshire	
1643–1649	Thomas Hodges (c.1600–1672)	Kensington		
	Richard Holdsworth, D. D. (1590–1649)			of Cambridge
1643–1649	Joshua Hoyle, D. D. (bap. 1588, d. 1654)		Cumberland	of Dublin, Ireland
	Henry Hutton (d. 1671)		Westmorland	
1643–1648	John Jackson (1600–1648)	Marsac	Northumberland	
1646–1652	Robert Johnston (d. 1670)		Yorkshire	
1643–1649	John Langley (d. 1657)	West-Tuderly	Hampshire	
	William Launce (c.1588–1666)	Harrow	London	
1643–1649	John Ley (1584–1662)	Budworth	Cheshire	
1643–1652	John Lightfoot, D. D. (1602–1675)	Ashley, Staffordshire	Staffordshire	
	Richard Love, D. D. (1596–1661)	Ekington	Derbyshire	
	William Lyford (1597?–1653)	Sherbourne		
1643–1651	Jean de la Marche (1585–1651)		Guernsey	of the French Congregations
1643–1649	Stephen Marshall, B. D. (1594/5?–1655)	Finchingfield	Essex	
1643–1649	John Maynard (1600–1665)		Sussex	
1643–1649	William Mew, B. D. (1602–1659)	Eastington	Gloucestershire	
1643–1649	Thomas Micklethwaite (d. 1663)	Cherryburton		
	William Moreton (d. 1643)	Newcastle upon Tyne	Durham	
	George Morley, D. D. (1598?–1684)		Monmouthshire	of Minden Hall; later he became Bishop of Worcester, then Bishop of Winchester
1643–1649	Matthew Newcomen (d. 1669)	Dedham	Essex	
	William Nicholson, D. D. (1591–1672)		Carmarthenshire	afterwards Bishop of Gloucester
	Henry Nye (1589–1643)	Clapham	Sussex	
1643–1652	Philip Nye (bap. 1595, d. 1672)	Kimbolton	Huntingdonshire	
1643–1644	Henry Painter (c.1583–1644)	Exeter	Devon	
1643–1647	Herbert Palmer, B. D. (1601–1647)	Ashwell	Bedfordshire	
1643	Edward Peale (1583–1645)	Compton	Dorsetshire	
1643–1649	Andrew Perne (c.1595–1654)	Wilby	Northamptonshire	
1643–1649	John Philips (c.1585–1663)	Wrentham	Suffolk	
1643–1649	Benjamin Pickering (fl. 1620–1649)	East Hoatly	Sussex	
1643–1649	Samuel de la Place (1576/7–1658)		Jersey	of the French Congregations
1643–1649	William Price (d. 1666)			of St. Paul's Covent Garden
1643–1649	Nicholas Prophet (c.1599–1669)	Marlborough	Wiltshire	
	John Pyne (bap. 1600, d. 1678)	Bereferrars	Devon	
1643–1644	William Rathbone (d. 1644)		Monmouthshire	
1643–1652	William Rayner (c.1595–1666)	Egham	Berkshire	
1643–1649	Edward Reynolds (1599–1676)	Brampton	Northamptonshire	became Bishop of Norwich at The Restoration (1660)
1643–1649	Henry Roborough (d. 1649)			non-voting scribe
1643–1652	Arthur Sallaway (b. 1606)	Severn Stoake	Worcestershire	
	Robert Sanderson, D. D. (1587–1663)	Boothby-Pagnell	Lincolnshire	
1643–1649	Henry Scudder (d. 1652)	Colingbourne	Wiltshire	
1643–1649	Lazarus Seaman, B. D. (d. 1675)		London	
1643–1649	Obadiah Sedgwick, B. D. (1599/1600–1658)	Coggeshall	Essex	
	Josias Shute, B. D. (bap. 1588, d. 1643)	Lombard Street, London	Cardiganshire	
1643–1652	Sidrach Simpson (c.1600–1655)		Worcestershire	some sources say he was of London
1643–1649	Peter Smith, D. D. (1586–1653)	Barkway	Hertfordshire	also known as Brocket Smith
1643–1649	William Spurstowe, D. D. (d. 1666)	Hampden	Merioneth	
1643–1649	Edmund Staunton, D. D. (1600–1671)	Kingston	Surrey	
1643–1652	Peter Sterry (1613–1672)		London	
1643–1649	Matthias Stiles or Styles (1591–1652)	Eastcheap	Oxford University, London	
1644–1652	John Strickland (bap. 1601?, d. 1670)		Cambridge University	
1646–1649	William Strong (d. 1654)		Dorset	
1643–1649	Francis Taylor (1589–1656)	Yalding	Kent	
1643–1649	Thomas Temple, B. D. (c.1601–1661)	Battersey	Brecknockshire	
1643–1649	Thomas Thorowgood (c.1595–1669)	Massingham	Norfolk	
1643–1649	Christopher Tesdale (1592–1655)	Uphurstbourne	Hampshire	
1643–1649	Henry Tozer, B. D. (c.1601–1650)		Glamorganshire	of Oxford
1643–1649	Anthony Tuckney, D. D. (1599–1670)	Boston	Lincolnshire	
1643–1646	William Twisse, D. D. (1577/8–1646)	Newbury	Berkshire	Prolocutor of the Assembly from its beginning until his death
	James Ussher (1581–1656)		Oxford University	Archbishop of Armagh
1643–1649	Thomas Valentine, B. D. (1586–1665)	Chalfent Giles	Buckinghamshire	
1643–1649	Richard Vines (1599/1600–1656)	Calcot	Warwickshire	
1643–1649	George Walker, B. D. (bap. 1582?, d. 1651)		London	
1643–1649	John Wallis (1616–1703)			non-voting scribe; also a mathematician
1645	John Ward (d. 1665)			
	Samuel Ward, D. D. (1572–1643)		Cambridge University	Master of Sidney Sussex College, Cambridge
1643–1649	James Welby (fl. 1643–1649)	Sylatten	Denbighshire	
1643	Thomas Westfield, D. D. (1573–1644)			Bishop of Bristol
	Francis Whiddon (c.1599–1656/7)	Moretonhampstead	Devon	
1643–1649	Jeremiah Whitaker (1599–1654)	Stretton	Rutland	
1643–1648	John White (1575–1648)	Dorchester	Dorset	
1643–1649	Henry Wilkinson the younger, B. D. (1610–1675)	Stepney	London	of St. Dunstan's
1643–1647	Henry Wilkinson the elder, B. D. (1566–1647)	Waddesden	Buckinghamshire	
1643–1649	Thomas Wilson (c.1601–1653)	Otham	Kent	
1643–1647	John Wincop, D. D. (c.1602–1647)	Elesworth		of St Martin-in-the-Fields
1643–1649	Francis Woodcock (1614–1649×51)		Durham	
1643–1649	Thomas Young (c.1587–1655)	Stowmarket	Suffolk	

== Lay assessors ==
=== Nobles ===
Members of the House of Lords who served as lay assessors at the Westminster Assembly (in alphabetical order by family name)
Dates of participation	Name
1643–1649	William Cecil, 2nd Earl of Salisbury (1591–1668)
	Edward Conway, 2nd Viscount Conway (bap. 1594, d. 1655)
1644–1646	Robert Devereux, 3rd Earl of Essex (1591–1646)
	Basil Feilding, 2nd Earl of Denbigh (c.1608–1675)
1643–1649	William Fiennes, 1st Viscount Saye and Sele (1582–1662)
	William Grey, 1st Baron Grey of Werke (1593/4–1674)
1643–1649	Philip Herbert, 4th Earl of Pembroke (1584–1650)
1643–1649	Edward Howard, 1st Baron Howard of Escrick (d. 1675)
1643–1649	Edward Montagu, 2nd Earl of Manchester (1602–1671)
1643–1649	Algernon Percy, 10th Earl of Northumberland (1602–1668)
	Henry Rich, 1st Earl of Holland (1591–1668)
c.1644–1649	Robert Rich, 2nd Earl of Warwick (1587–1658)
	William Russell, 5th Earl of Bedford (1616–1700)
	Oliver St John, 1st Earl of Bolingbroke (c.1584–1646)
1643–1649	Philip Wharton, 4th Baron Wharton (1613–1696)

=== Commoners ===
Members of the House of Commons who served as lay assessors at the Westminster Assembly (in alphabetical order)
Dates of participation	Name	Notes
1644	Sir Thomas Barrington (c.1585–1644)	
1643–1647	John Clotworthy, 1st Viscount Massereene (d. 1665)	
1643–1649	John Cooke (bap. 1608, d. 1660)	one of the regicides
1643–1649	Sir John Evelyn (1601–1685)	
1643?–1649	Nathaniel Fiennes (1607/8–1669)	
1643?–1649	Sir Gilbert Gerard (1587–1670)	
1643?–1649	Sir John Glynne (1603–1666)	
1644–1649	Sir Robert Harley (bap. 1579, d. 1656)	
1643–1649	Arthur Haselrig (1601–1661)	
1644–1649	William Masham (1615/16–1654/5)	
1643?–1649	Sir John Maynard (1602–1690)	
1643–1649	William Pierrepont (1607/8–1678)	
1643–1649	Edmond Prideaux (1601–1659)	
1643–1649	Sir Robert Pye (bap. 1585, d. 1662)	
1643	John Pym (1584–1643)	
1644–1649	Sir Robert Reynolds (1600/01–1678)	
1643–1649	Francis Rous (1580/81–1659)	
1643–1649	Sir Benjamin Rudyerd (1572–1658)	
1643–1649	Oliver St John (c.1598–1673)	
1643–1649	Humphrey Salwey (c.1575–1652)	
1643–1649	John Selden (1584–1654)	
1645	William Strode (bap. 1594, d. 1645)	
1644?–1649	Zouch Tate (1606–1650)	
1643–1649	Sir Henry Vane the Younger (1613–1662)	
1643–1649	Sir Henry Vane the Elder (1589–1655)	
1643–1649	William Wheeler (c.1601–1666)	
1643–1645	John White (1590–1645)	
1643–1649	Bulstrode Whitelocke (1605–1675)	
	John Wilde (1590–1669)	
	Walter Yonge (bap. 1579, d. 1649)	

== Scottish commissioners ==
=== Ministers ===
Church of Scotland ministers who served as commissioners at the Westminster Assembly (in alphabetical order)
Dates of participation	Name
1643–1647	Robert Baillie (1602–1662)
	Robert Blair (1593–1666)
	Robert Douglas (1594–1674)
1643–1647	George Gillespie (1613–1648)
1643–1645	Alexander Henderson (c.1583–1646)
1643–1647	Samuel Rutherford (c.1600–1661)

=== Elders ===
Church of Scotland elders who served as commissioners at the Westminster Assembly (in alphabetical order by family name)
Dates of participation	Name
1646	Archibald Campbell, 1st Marquess of Argyll (1605x7–1661)
1644–1646	John Campbell, 1st Earl of Loudoun (1598–1662)
1644–1647	John Elphinstone, 2nd Lord Balmerino (d. 1649)
1645	Sir Charles Erskine of Alva (d. 1663)
1644–1646	Archibald Johnston, Lord Warriston (bap. 1611, d. 1663)
	John Kennedy, 6th Earl of Cassilis (1601x7–1668)
1643–1648	John Maitland, Viscount Maitland (1616–1682)
	Robert Meldrum (fl. 1620–1647)
1647	George Winram, Lord Liberton (d. 1650)
