= Julines Herring =

Church of England clergyman (1582–1644/5)

- Born: 1582; Llanbrynmair, Wales
- Died: 1644/5; Amsterdam, Netherlands
- Education: Sidney Sussex College, Cambridge
- Occupation: Puritan preacher.
- Years active: 1610–45
- Spouse: Christian Gellibrand
- Children: John, Jonathan, Samuel, James, Christian, Dorcas, Mary, Joanna
- Religion: Presbyterian
- Church: Church of England, Dutch Reformed Church
- Ordained: 1610
- Offices held: Preacher at Calke; Lecturer at St Alkmund's Church, Shrewsbury; Pastor at English Reformed Church, Amsterdam.

Julines Herring (1582–1644/5) was a Puritan clergyman within the Church of England who served in Derbyshire and at Shrewsbury. Ejected from his positions for nonconformity, he became a minister serving the English-speaking community in the Netherlands. He was a staunch proponent of Presbyterianism and an opponent of separatism.

== Origins ==
Herring was born in Wales at Llanbrynmair, Montgomeryshire, often rendered in older sources in Anglicised forms, e.g. Flamber-Mayre, or Flambere-Mayre. He was a son of Richard Herring, a prominent local politician of Coventry, who served at various times as mayor and sheriff. The Herring family had branches in Shropshire and the 1623 heraldic visitation of Shropshire named the parent Warwickshire branch as being "of Owsley iuxta Couentry" in Warwickshire, which seems to be the modern Allesley, a parish that was broken into smaller parts in Victorian times. St Andrew's Church, serving Allesley Green and Eastern Green on the eastern edge of Coventry, claims Pond Farm as the former local residence of Julines Herring.

== Education and early life ==
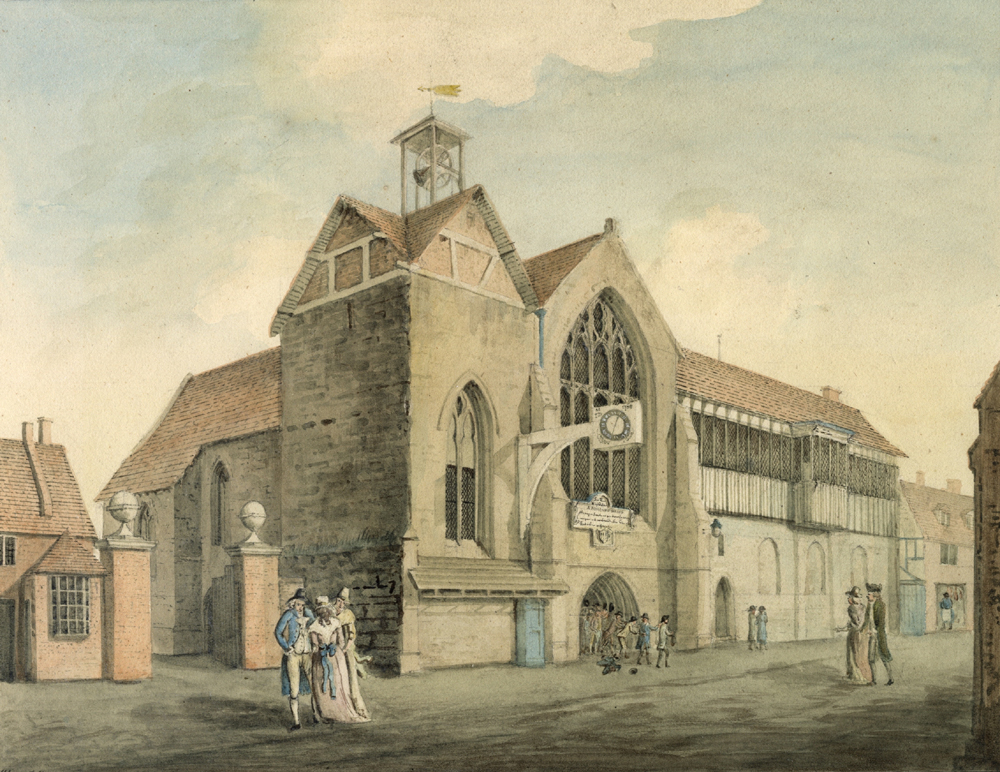
The old free grammar school building, Coventry, formerly the site of St. John's Hospital, now a local history museum and study centre.

It seems that the Herring family returned to Coventry while Julines was very young. He was schooled initially at the small border village of More, Shropshire by a Mr Perkin, a close relative of his mother. Samuel Clarke, whose 1651 account is the basis for all later biographers, thought that it was from Perkin at More that Herring "learned the Principles of Religion." Clarke describes Perkin as a minister at More-chappel and these details have generally been accepted at face value. However, the Clergy of the Church of England database lists More as a parish church within the Diocese of Hereford, not as a chapelry. Eyton, the pioneering historian of Shropshire, considered that More probably began as a chapelry of Lydbury North but "became independent, at a period which the earliest Records fail to reach." CCEd does list some clergy at More in the 1580s and Perkin is not among them, although the database cannot be exhaustive. It does not note any parish school at More but there was one at nearby Lydbury, although records of staff seem to start only with the Restoration. The older Dictionary of National Biography avers that Perkin was a minister at Morechurch: there is a Churchmoor, further east, in Lydbury North parish, but it is a hamlet with no chapel.

Herring then moved to the family home at Coventry, where he attended the Free Grammar School. Clarke credits his academic progress there to the then headmaster, whom he names as Reverend Master Tovey. Even as a schoolboy he was noted for his piety. Clarke credits him with an early interest and delight in the Bible passages that deal with faith and repentance – themes typically of great concern to Protestants. On play days, he and a few friends engaged in prayer and religious exercises before going out.

In May 1600 Herring was admitted as a scholar to Sidney Sussex College, Cambridge, then a new, specifically Protestant institution. University records show he graduated BA in the academic year 1603-4: Clarke thought Herring returned to Coventry as a Master of Arts. There he studied Divinity with the encouragement of Humphrey Fenn, a noted advocate of Presbyterianism and formerly a client of Robert Dudley, 1st Earl of Leicester. Fenn had been suspended from his ministry since 1590 for his activities within a Warwickshire classis within the Church of England and had not regained his vicarage of Holy Trinity Church, Coventry. Herring, however, seems to have found opportunities to preach, winning considerable approval.

== Calke ==
Herring was approaching the age to take up a parish ministry of his own, but this required ordination. Number 36 of the Book of Canons, confirmed by the Convocations of Canterbury and York in 1604 and 1606 respectively, demanded that all candidates for ordination take a three-fold oath, accepting the royal supremacy, the Book of Common Prayer and the Thirty-Nine Articles. The subscription book of the Diocese of Coventry and Lichfield, which covered the area in Herring both lived and sought a living, summarised the oath as:

The king is the only supreme governor under God of all things spiritual as well as temporal: the Book of Common Prayer, with the ordering of bishops priests and deacons, contains nothing contrary to the word of God: the Articles of Religion (1562) are agreeable to the word of God.

Herring circumvented the requirement by securing ordination from an Irish bishop then visiting London. He was accompanied in this by other young Puritan men, including John Ball, a friend who was tutor to the children of Catherine and Robert Cholmondley. Only after the ordination were the pair able to take up their first ecclesiastical appointments: Ball as curate of Whitmore in Staffordshire; Herring as preacher at Calke in Derbyshire.

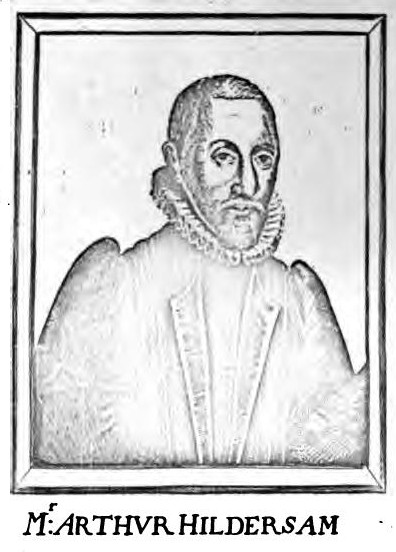
Arthur Hildersham, Puritan preacher, from Samuel Clarke's Generall Martyrologie, 1651. Woodcut, artist unknown.

Herring was recommended for the post at Calke by Arthur Hildersham, the vicar of Ashby-de-la-Zouch, which was close by, although in Leicestershire. In his early years he was both friend and protégé of Hildersham, part of a generation of younger disciples that included Simeon Ashe and Hildersham's own son, Samuel. Herring was not the first member of Hilderham's circle appointed to Calke: Robert Bainbridge, the patron, had earlier installed George More, a close associate of Hildersham and of John Darrell. During the 1590s More took part in the religious exercises of the Hildersham circle, which included fasting, prayer, lectures and fellowship, and supported Darrell in the highly controversial work of exorcism.

Clarke considered Calke a relatively secure base for Herring because it was a peculiar jurisdiction exempt from episcopal authority, as well as bringing the support of a sympathetic patron. CCEd, citing a 1772 reference, makes clear that Calke was a donative, rather than a peculiar. Magna Britannia, published in 1817, numbered Calke among nine Derbyshire parishes that were donatives before the Victorian abolition of these institutions. In a donative the patron had the right to make an appointment to the benefice without reference to the ordinary – in this case the local diocesan bishop. The church and the incumbent were exempt from ordinary jurisdiction: in a peculiar there is an ordinary jurisdiction but it does not belong to the local bishop. Calke church was part of Calke manor – a former monastic estate that passed into lay hands through the Dissolution of the Monasteries. Although later named Calke Abbey, it had actually been a very small Augustinian priory, which was absorbed as a mere cell into its own daughter house, Repton Priory: under the founder's terms, the church had been given to the canons on condition they supply it with a priest. Robert Bainbridge bought the Calke estate in 1582 from Richard Wennesley, a local landowner who had recusant affinities. Bainbridge probably took on the opportunity and obligation to provide a minister in order to secure freedom of worship for himself, as he had several other houses and seems to have had his main residence in Derby. He was a militant Protestant, three times MP for Derby, who was imprisoned in the Tower of London during March 1587 after he had demanded the execution of Mary, Queen of Scots and supported Anthony Cope's proposal for a radical reform of Church government: he and his friends made the mistake of continuing to argue outside the chamber of the House of Commons, where they were not protected by parliamentary privilege.

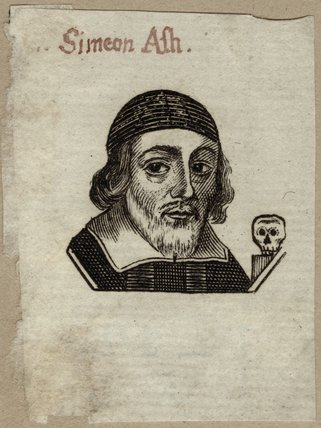
Simeon Ashe

Although Calke was a very small settlement, then as now, it seems to have formed an ideal base for Herring's ministry, which was primarily one of preaching. Clarke remarks that "God was pleased to set a broad scale to his Ministry." A clear and powerful preacher, he drew an audience from up to twenty towns and villages, with Sunday congregations in good weather so large that many were forced to cluster around the windows to hear him. Some brought picnics and made a day of it, while others bought refreshments from the "threepenny ordinary" provided for strangers. The impact of his preaching on the region was increased by the practice of returning home in groups, singing psalms and discussing the sermon. Clarke thought that the effectiveness of Herring's preaching as part of the Hildersham circle was proved by the very high retention of Puritan converts in the region, who remained with the cause through the "broken dividing times" that followed: presumably meaning the period of Thorough or absolute monarchy, the English Civil War and the Regicide. Herring seems to have had a profound influence over Simeon Ashe, later a moderate Presbyterian preacher and an intimate of important parliamentarian leaders, including Robert Greville, 2nd Baron Brooke and Edward Montagu, 2nd Earl of Manchester. Herring took the opportunity of a relatively stable period in his life to marry and start a family. His wife was Christian Gellibrand. The match was remembered in Puritan hagiography as particularly happy and mutually-supportive.

Herring's ministry at Calke seems to have lasted until 1618. Clarke thought he was "forced from thence for Nonconformity by the Prelatical power, being informed against by ill-affected men." He gives no details of how Herring could be removed from a donative. Barbara Coulton, a recent historian of Shrewsbury during this the period, gives 1617 as the year Herring was recruited by William Rowley of Shrewsbury, suggesting that he was attracted by a more influential post rather than driven out of Calke. This is supported by the baptism of Christian, a daughter of Herring, at St Chad's Church, Shrewsbury as early as 1 February 1618. Herring's patron Bainbridge must by this time have been elderly, as he first sat in the House of Commons in 1571. He may have been in financial difficulties: although he had a vault prepared for his burial at Calke, he sold the estate only three years after Herring's departure and died before July 1623.

== Shrewsbury ==
In 1618 Herring took up residence in Shrewsbury, at the invitation of the corporation, as lecturer at St Alkmund's Church. This was not an incumbency: the vicar of St Alkmund's throughout Herring's time in Shrewsbury was Thomas Lloyd, who had been appointed in 1607. Lloyd was held in no great regard as a preacher and was paid £5 to read Morning Prayer. Herring's lectureship did not require an oath before the bishop, as it was privately funded by a £20 annuity. This was provided by Rowland Heylyn, a merchant of Welsh ancestry, educated at Shrewsbury School and a former parishioner of St Alkmund's, who had become immensely wealthy and powerful in the Worshipful Company of Ironmongers in London. Heylyn had two sisters living in Shrewsbury, Ann and Eleanor, who were married respectively to John Nicholls and Richard Hunt, powerful local politicians who were associates of William Rowley, described by Clarke as "a wise religious man." It was Rowley who made the initial approach to Herring and acted throughout as his "faithful friend." It seems that he initially accommodated the Herring family in his own mansion. Rowley was a member of Shrewsbury's powerful Drapers' Company and Hunt was its warden. The company's hall was vacant and it was probably they who prevailed on the members to lease it to Herring for £4 annually, the company reserving the right to use it for meetings but agreeing to pay for repairs.

Herring was obliged to preach twice weekly: on Tuesday morning and at 1 pm on Sunday. This was to avoid offending the other clergy in the town by poaching their congregations. In addition, he repeated the Sunday sermon that evening, alternating between the houses of three powerful Puritan merchants: Edward Jones, George Wright and Rowley. A specimen of his preaching, showing his hermeneutic method at the service of his Puritan audience, runs:

1 Corinthians 3:22b: All are yours.

Yours! Whose meaneth the apostle by yours? The Christian Corinths, to whome this epistle was directed, and those words. And what meaneth hee by the word all. The verse itself shewes you. "Whether Paul, or Apollos, or Cephas, or the world, – or life, or death, or things present, or things to come, All are yours." And the expression is of a further latitude, v. 21. for all things are yours. All things therefore are the true Christian's. This is the truth that I am to teach you. Therefore, without any further coherence of these words with the former, or resolving the text into parts, (which is the ordinarie course of ministers,) I must fall upon this; – all things are the true Christian's.

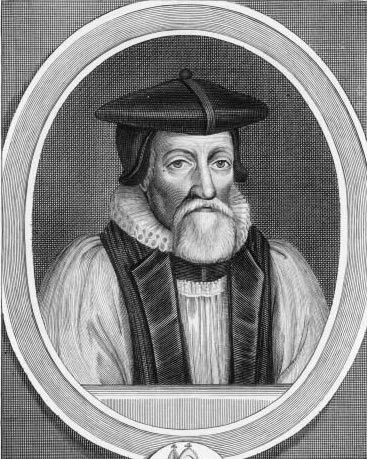
Thomas Morton

Herring was subject to attack and controversy on both sides, conservative and radical, during his preaching ministry at Shrewsbury. As early as 1620, just after Thomas Morton became Bishop of Coventry and Lichfield, Herring was reported to the authorities for failure to use the prayer book and to receive or administer the sacraments. Morton had clashed with Puritan clergy in his former Diocese of Chester over ceremonial practices and the Declaration of Sports. His response had been eirenic in spirit, if sometimes exacting and abrasive in person: he had, for example, given Thomas Paget, a leading Lancashire Puritan minister, 10 shillings towards his legal expenses after compelling him to appear with a list of written arguments against signing with the cross in baptism. Morton referred Herring to two neighbouring ministers for satisfaction and he made a written statement of his reservations. The two ministers supported Herring with a certificate to the bishop and he pronounced himself satisfied with Herring's integrity. However, the incident opened up a series of suspensions and reinstatements. It seems that he continued to conduct private fasts and Bible expositions even during periods when his public ministry was made impossible. These would have been held in Draper's Hall, which was his own home.

Opposition to Herring coalesced around Peter Studley, who was incumbent or curate of St Chad's from 1622 and also took responsibility for St Julian's, which was very close. His appointment seems to reflect the emergence on the corporation of a conservative opposition, which was able to appoint a second lecturer to St Alkmund's: Samuel Greaves, the Rector of Berrington, who preached on Wednesday mornings for £10 a year. An episcopal visitation of 1626, possibly attended by Morton himself, found Studley at loggerheads with the town's Puritans and many of the complaints and counter-claims were directly related to Herring's preaching ministry. The congregation of St Julian's were up in arms because, they alleged, Studley deliberately timed services to prevent them attending preaching elsewhere, but refrained from preaching himself. Studley reported Rowley and Wright for holding preaching and prayer meetings in their homes on Sunday evenings, suggesting that the episcopal court should judge whether or not these constituted conventicles. However, Studley was also meeting fierce opposition from a more radical group of poorer parishioners, of whom the most prominent were Katherine Chidley and her family. Chidley had led a group of women in refusing to take part in the churching of women, which some Puritans found offensive and for which Studley demanded a fee. She arrived through her experiences at separatist conclusions and was later to write in justification of Independent or Congregationalist tendency within Puritanism. Herring was opposed to this group, and Clarke reports his frequent observation:

It is a sin of an high nature to unchurch a Nation at once, and that this would become the spring of many other fearful errours, for separation will eat like a Gangrene into the heart of Godlinesse. And he did pray, that they who would un-church others, might not be un-christianed themselves.

Herring's opposition to separatism was also made manifest by his attendance at his local parish church, even though he had an appointment in a neighbouring parish. He attended the Lord's Supper at St Mary's, a royal peculiar that was effectively controlled by the corporation. The vicar on Herring's arrival was William Bright, a nominee of the Puritan divine Laurence Chaderton, and congenial to Herring. However, Bright died in October 1618 and was buried on the 29th of that month. He was replaced, on Chaderton's recommendation, with Samuel Browne, a more moderate figure who nevertheless stoutly defended his church against episcopal interference. On 19 January 1620, the St Mary's parish register records the burial of "A sonn, being not baptized, of Mr. Hearing, a Mynester of God's word." Later in the same year, on 17 December, the register records a baptism: "Samuell, s. of Mr. Hearing, preacher of the Word." These descriptions suggest concord between Browne and Herring. Moreover, for the baptism of Dorcas on 30 January 1623 Herring is again described as a preacher of the Word, and for Mary's on 6 February 1625 as "Mynester," while Browne himself is described in the entry for his own daughter's baptism as "publique preacher." This suggests a looseness of terminology and a sense of equality and respect between the two clerics. The baptisms of two more children chart Herring's residence in the parish: for Joanna's on 19 August 1627 he is simply "Mr. Jolynus Hearing." However, after Browne's death in 1632 and the appointment of the Puritan James Betton to St Mary's, the entry for Herring's son Theophilus on 5 September 1633 again uses the title "Minister". As he continued a valued parishioner of St Mary's, Herring's position at St Alkmund's also became more secure. Heylyn operated through a group of Puritan ministers and businessmen who had established a body known as the Feoffees for Impropriations, sometimes known as the Collectors of St Antholin, to channel funds into Puritan preaching. Heylyn became a feoffee in 1626 and two years later oversaw the acquisition of the advowson of St Alkmund's and a lease on the tithes of St Mary's. His distance from any radicalism strengthened his position, so that it was admitted even by his enemies:

Though he be scrupulous in matter of ceremony, yet he is a loyal subject unto the King, and a true friend unto the state.

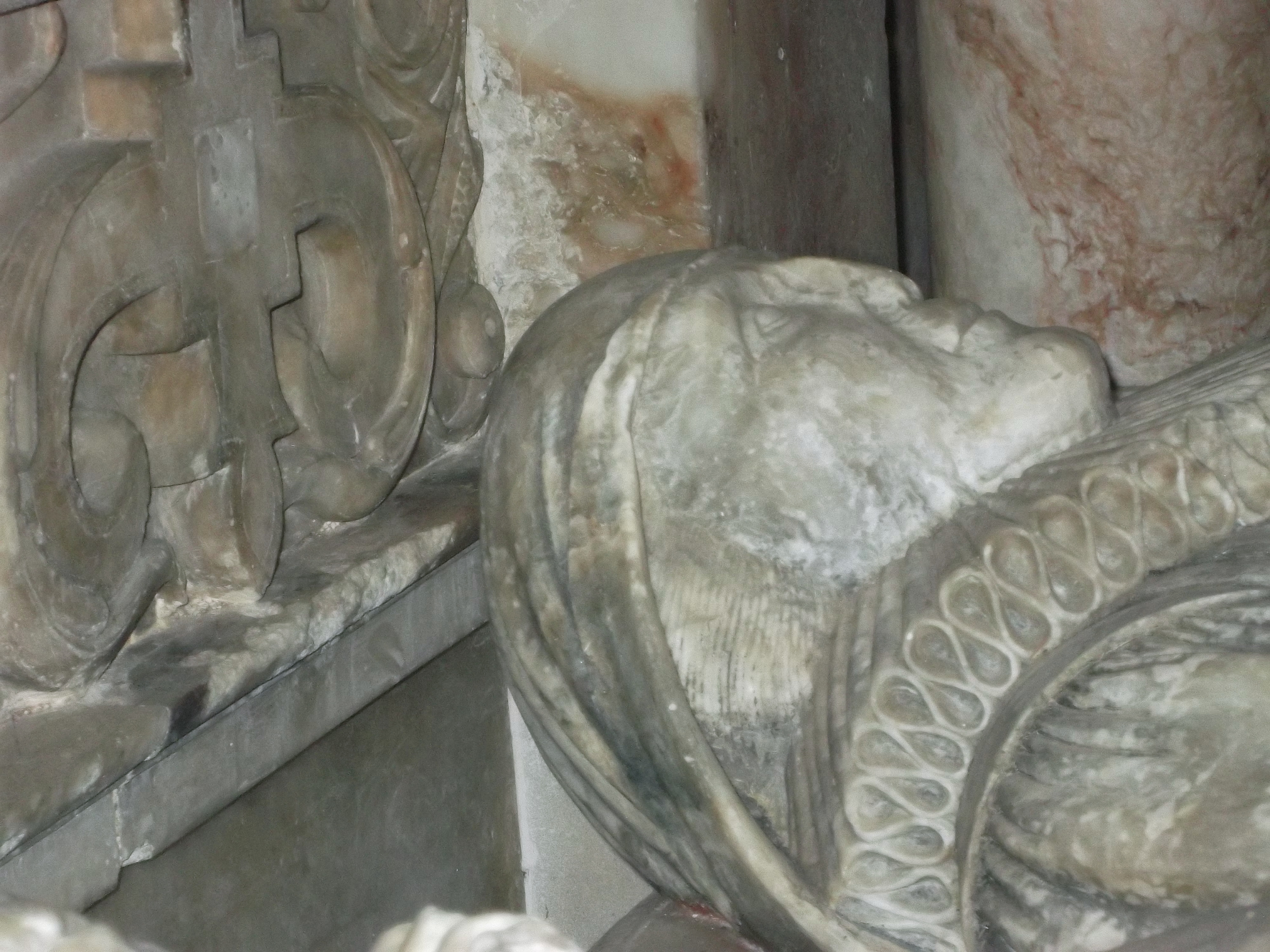
Effigy of Lady Margaret Bromley, Worfield.

Herring continued to make and maintain links with moderate Presbyterian preachers in the region and beyond, gaining recognition for Shrewsbury as the centre of a Puritan network. He brought his brother-in-law, Robert Nicolls of Wrenbury, and Thomas Pierson of Brampton Bryan to preach in the town. It is possible that Samuel Clarke, Herring's biographer, also visited Shrewsbury. Along with John Ball, Pierson, Nicolls and Herring were part of a group who met for religious exercises in Sheriffhales at the home of Lady Margaret Bromley, widow from 1626 of the noted judge Sir Edward Bromley.

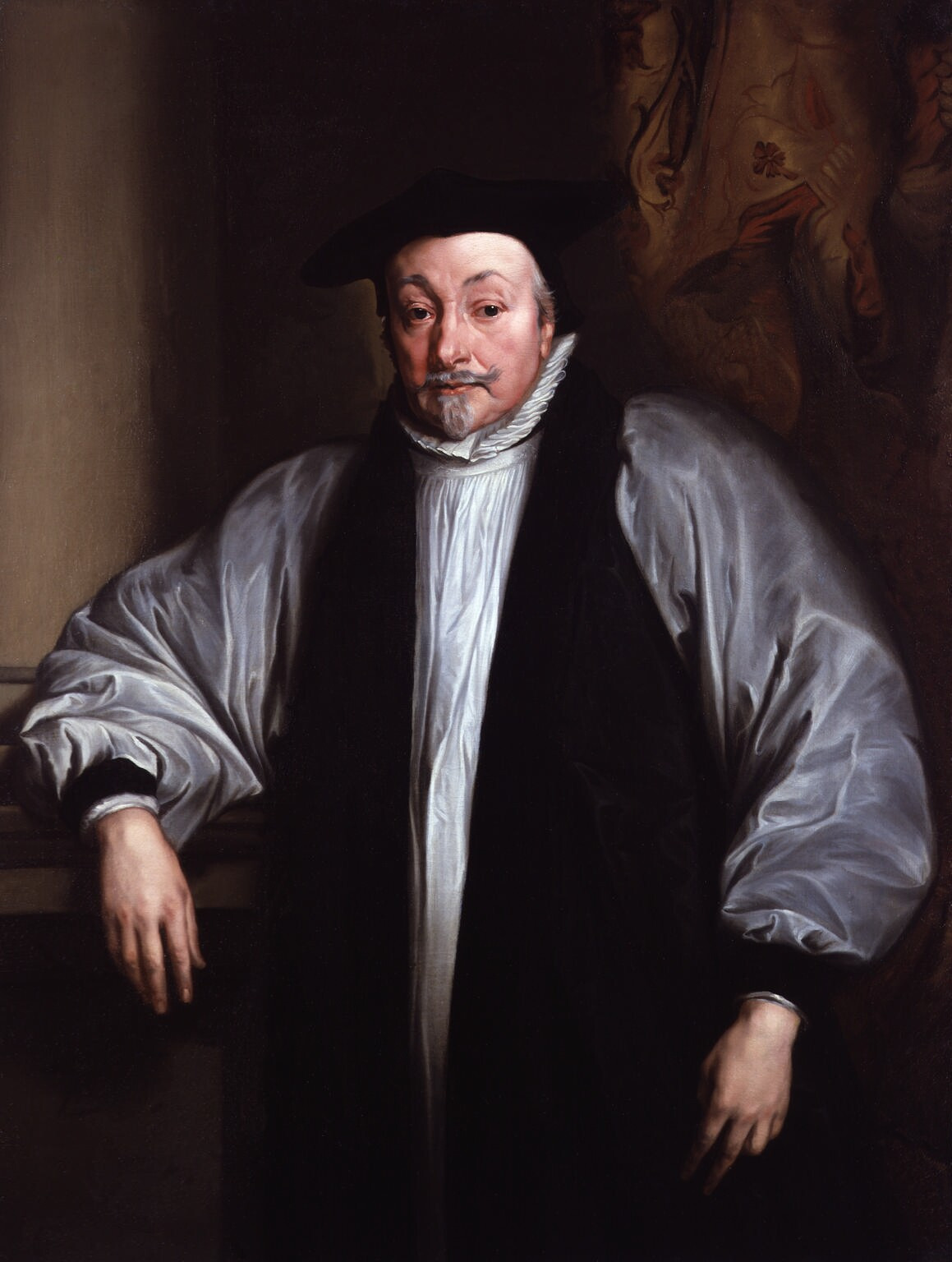
William Laud

During the 1630s the bitterness of religious conflict at Shrewsbury intensified to a pitch that brought national attention and made Herring's position precarious. Bishop Wright's visitation of the town provided Studley with an opportunity for a triumphal reading of ordinances on the decoration of churches, but also for a denunciation of his opponents that revealed the depth of opposition. Herring's supporters, Rowley and Wright, were now joined by Humphrey Mackworth as leaders of a group that refused to bow at the Name of Jesus and to kneel for communion, and so were counted as refusers of the Eucharist. Studley went on to write a savage denunciation of Puritanism, The Looking-Glass of Schisme, claiming that religious nonconformity had influenced the commission of sensational murders at Clun. The furore in Shrewsbury attracted the attention of William Laud, the Archbishop of Canterbury himself. Laud proposed to use negotiations over the renewal of the town's charter to prize the town's main churches free of the corporation's control. He acknowledged Herring's role in the town's opposition with the comment: "I will pickle up that Herring of Shrewsbury." Herring's response is reported as:

If he will abuse his power, let it teach Christians the more to use their prayers. And be then prayed that the Non-conformists enemies might by observation that they have a good God to trust unto, when trampled upon by ill-despised men.

Laud instituted a visitation of the entire Province of Canterbury in 1635, with Nathaniel Brent conducting enquiries in the Lichfield diocese. Brent suspended Puritans at St Peter's Collegiate Church in Wolverhampton, before moving on to Shrewsbury, where he also came into conflict with local clergy. At some point in the early part of 1635 Herring and his family left Shrewsbury.

== Wrenbury ==
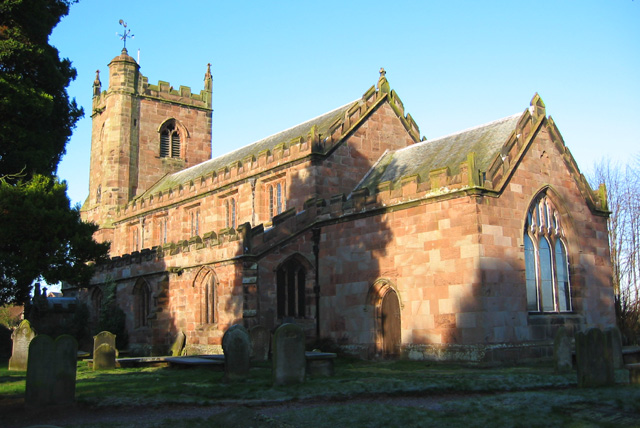
St Margaret's Church, Wrenbury, where Nicolls and Peartree were incumbents.

Herring sought a home first in Wrenbury, Cheshire, where his wife's sister lived: Robert Nicolls, her husband and Herring's friend, had died at Sheriffhales in 1630. Wrenbury had originally been part of the parish of St Mary's Church, Acton, and its church was still in the gift of the vicar of Acton. The incumbent was William Peartree of Bury St Edmunds, who had been suspended by Brent. Herring had no formal appointment but lived privately as a parishioner, offering pastoral support by "comforting afflicted consciences." Clarke claimed that Herring only moved to Wrenbury after despairing of his future in Shrewsbury, but it seems that he had not taken steps formally to terminate his lectureship or even his tenancy. On 14 April 1635 the Drapers' Company resolved to write to Herring about rent arrears of £4 and to enquire whether he proposed to take up residence and preach before Midsummer, after which time they would let his house to "some brother of the company." It was duly leased on 17 September to John Betton, a draper.

== Amsterdam ==
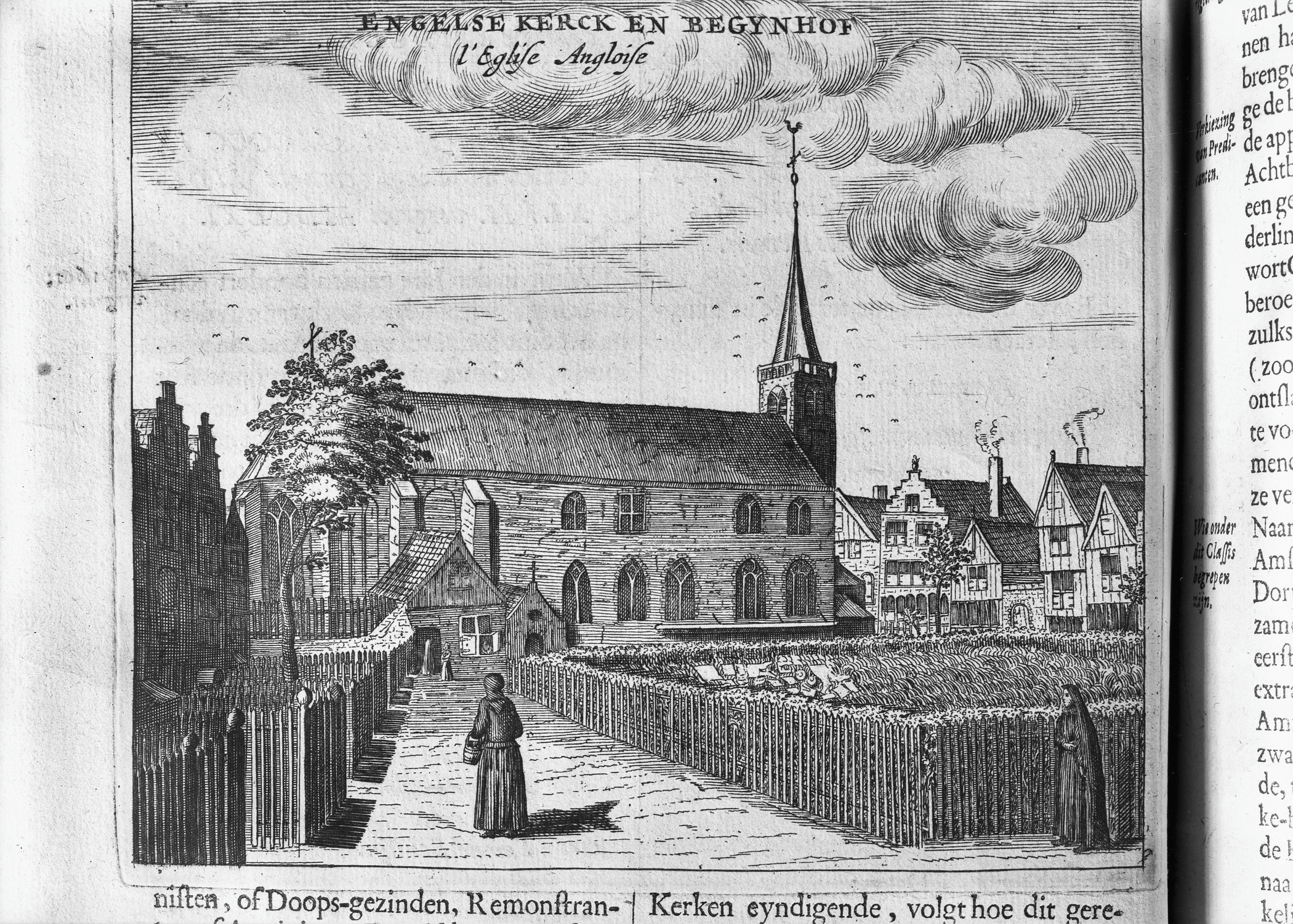
17th century print of the exterior of the English Reformed Church, from Beschrijvinge van Amsterdam by Tobias van Domselaer (1611-85).

This was a time of indecision for Herring. He received invitations to leave for New England but felt it was not for him. His reservations may have been connected with a letter Herring and thirteen other Puritan clerics sent in 1637 to ministers in New England, which raised the alarm about separatism among them. However, towards the end of 1636, some friends put forward his name to John Rulice or Rulitius, then a pastor of the English Reformed Church, Amsterdam. Rulice had been sent to London to find someone who might take over the responsibilities of John Paget, the church's first pastor, now emeritus. The opportunity faced Herring with numerous issues and conflicts. Not only was he concerned to be leaving family and friends: he had a vast library of records, that might incriminate them, but were of great personal and religious value to himself and his cause. After much deliberation, he burnt most of this collection, fearing a search of his person en route or of his home after he had left. This he described as that "Lesser martyrdom, wherein many of the best thoughts of his dearest friends were committed to flames." He was then forced to plan a secret journey, as Laud had forbidden clergy to travel abroad without a licence. After arranging a passage from Yarmouth, he made a will on 24 August 1637, leaving bequests for his wife and eight children. He then visited his sisters and set off for the coast with a brother-in-law, Oliver Bowles of Sutton, Bedfordshire. He avoided interception, reaching Rotterdam on 20 September and taking a wagon to Amsterdam the following day. He moved in with a friend, Whittaker, pending the arrival of his family and his remaining property.

Herring delivered his first sermon on Psalms 24:1: "The earth is the Lord's, and the fulness thereof; the world, and they that dwell therein." This met with great approval, securing his acceptance by the congregation. This paved the way for ratification by the Consistory of Holland and the Classis of Amsterdam. From the outset, he took a full part in the liturgy and culture of the Dutch Reformed Church, keeping the fast decreed by the States General of the Netherlands for the success of the army at the Siege of Breda. The arrival of his family the following day was a further relief, allowing him to commit himself to the post. He was joined after a couple of years by Thomas Paget, John's brother, who also took preaching and pastoral responsibilities at the English Reformed Church.

Amsterdam, then central to the wealth and culture of the Dutch Golden Age and a Protestant stronghold forged and tested in the Dutch Revolt and Thirty Years' War, gave Herring at last an unrivalled platform. He was now part of a functioning presbyterian system, complete with a collegial ministry, much as he and moderate Puritans, like himself and the Pagets, had demanded for England. He was able to pronounce more or less freely on the situation at home, where Charles I's absolute monarchy ran into the crisis of the Bishops' War, a prelude to the civil war in England. He prayed and spoke out for the establishment of a Presbyterian polity in England. He made a sharp distinction between the persons of the bishops, to whom he had no enmity, and their "Pride and Prelatical rule." He continued to stress a middle position, troubled by the many fissile Independent and Baptist sects among the English exile community in the Netherlands. When one of his sons returned to England, presumably around 1643, he warned him not to take part in any subversion of Presbyterian polity, saying "I am sure it is the Government of Jesus Christ."

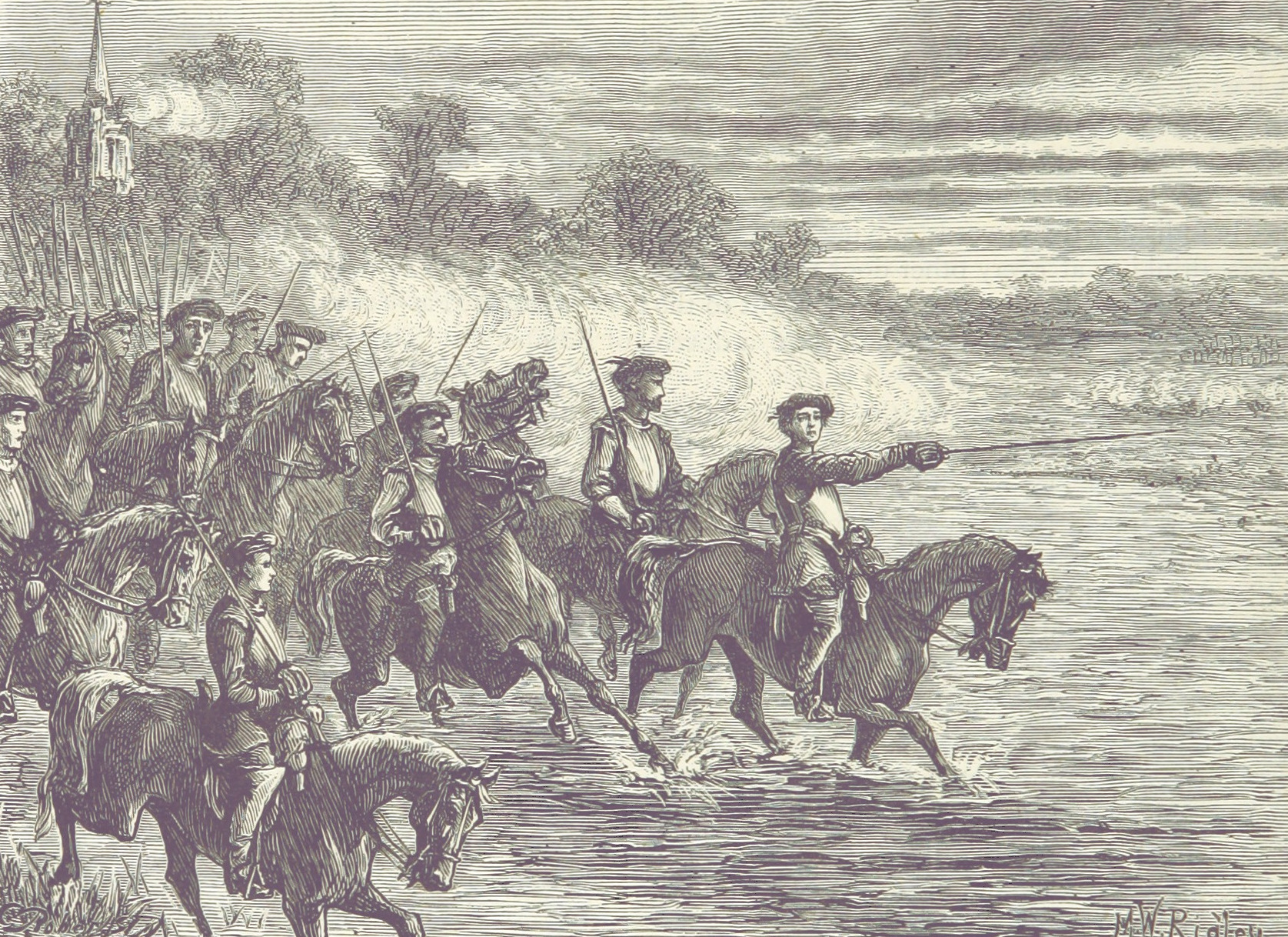
The Battle of Newburn

In 1640 he welcomed the invasion of northern England by a Scottish Covenanter army expressing the hope that the Scots "might be instruments of much good, but of no blood nor division between the two Nations." Clarke describes him as "one of God's special Remembrancers, in behalf of England, begging fervently that the Lords and Commons in Parliament, might be preserved from the two destructive rocks of pride and self-interest." In May 1642, Lloyd died, leaving a vacancy at St Alkmund's. The Puritan party in Shrewsbury, headed by Rowley and Mackworth, invited Herring back to resume his ministry but he probably declined. In the event, the corporation proved supine at the commencement of hostilities and a royalist coup led by Francis Ottley allowed the king's field army to occupy Shrewsbury on 20 September. The next stage of campaigning led to the major but indecisive Battle of Edgehill, which Herring greeted with the prayer:

Oh Lord wilt thou write Englands Reformation in red letters of her own blood; yet preserve thine own People, and maintaine thine own cause for Iesus Christs sake.

== Death ==
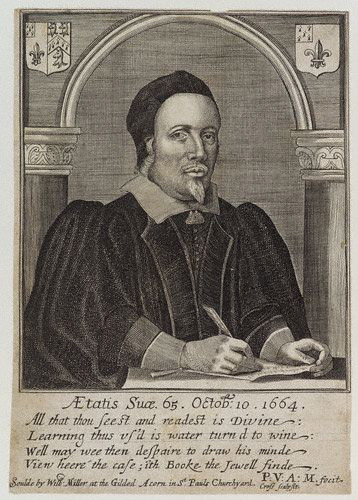
Samuel Clarke, biographer: a 1650 engraving attributed to Thomas Cross.

Herring seems to have entered into a long illness and he was clearly troubled by periods of doubt as well as suffering, in the language of the time, assaults by Satan. His last reported words, after such a period of uncertainty, were: "He is overcome, overcome, through the strength of my Lord and only Saviour Iesus, unto whom I am now going to keep a Sabbath in glory." He died the following morning, given by Clarke as Sunday 28 March 1644. The date is widely but not universally accepted. William Steven in 1833 calculated Herring's ministry as lasting eight years from 1637, which implies he died in 1645. Coulton in 2010 noted that the corporation of Shrewsbury wrote to Herring again asking him to return, apparently in 1645, some months after the town fell to Parliamentarian forces. The corporation's invitation seems inconsistent with a death in 1644. Coulton is noncommital about the actual date, but points out that the register of the English Reformed Church shows he was certainly dead by 18 May 1645. The parishioners of Chad's parish in Shrewsbury subsequently switched their attention to Thomas Paget, Herring's co-pastor at Amsterdam, and in 1646 elected him their minister. Herring's will was proved by Christian, his widow on 26 March 1646.

Samuel Clarke's biography of Herring, part of a set of Puritan studies appended to his Generall Martyrologie, appeared as early as 1651, under the Commonwealth of England, and is informed by many who knew Herring.

== Marriage and family ==
Herring married Christian Gellibrand during the time he was preaching at Calke. She was the third daughter of an English preacher who had served at Vlissingen, and a granddaughter of John Oxenbridge, a celebrated Warwickshire Puritan minister: hence she was a cousin of the John Oxenbridge who was a notable minister at Boston, Massachusetts. Christian outlived her husband by some years and was still alive and evidently in good standing with the Reformed community in 1651, when Clarke published his biography. One of her sisters married Robert Nicolls, minister at Wrenbury, another married Oliver Bowles of Sutton, Bedfordshire, and a third married one Barry of Cottesmore, Rutland. These all formed part of the Puritan network which helped sustain Herring's ministry.

Julines and Christian Herring had 13 children, although some are known to have died and only eight are mentioned in Juline's will. A son, Jonathan, seems to have preceded the children born at Shrewsbury: it may have been he who reached the Netherlands with or earlier than his father, as Herring had a son with him before the rest of the family arrived. Clarke considered it a mark of enlightened and loving upbringing that, before disciplining his children, Herring explained to them the nature of any wrong they had done.

== Mapping Julines Herring's life ==
Mapping Julines Herring's life
Location	Dates	Event	Approximate coordinates
Llanbrynmair, Powys	1582	Birthplace	52°36′43″N 3°37′39″W
More, Shropshire	1580s	Basic schooling	52°31′01″N 2°58′08″W
Allesley Green, Coventry	1582–1610	Likely parental home.	52°25′04″N 1°35′00″W
Free Grammar School, Coventry	1590s	Education	52°24′39″N 1°30′39″W
Sidney Sussex College, Cambridge	1605–9	Higher education.	52°12′26″N 0°07′13″E
Calke	1610–18	First preaching post	52°47′51″N 1°27′14″W
St Alkmund's Church, Shrewsbury	1618–35	Lecturer	52°42′27″N 2°45′08″W
St Margaret's Church, Wrenbury	1635–7	Assisted vicar William Peartree in private capacity.	53°01′33″N 2°36′26″W
English Reformed Church in the Begijnhof, Amsterdam	1637–c.1645	Pastor, largely alongside, Thomas Paget	52°22′10″N 4°53′25″E
