= Robert Dingley =

Robert Dingley may refer to:

- Robert Dingley (died 1395), MP for Wiltshire
- Robert Dingley (died 1456), MP for Hampshire
- Robert Dingley (FRS) (baptised 1710–1781), merchant, banker and philanthropist
- Robert Dingley (Roundhead) (1619–1660)
