= Nicholas Bownde =

English clergyman

Nicholas Bownde, Bownd or Bound (died 1613) was an English clergyman, known for his Christian Sabbatarian writings.

== Life ==
He was son of Robert Bownde (Bound), M.D., physician to the Duke of Norfolk. He was educated at Peterhouse, Cambridge, where he graduated B.A. in 1572, was elected a fellow later that year, and graduated M.A. in 1575. On 3 September 1585 he was instituted to the rectory of Norton, Suffolk, a living in the gift of his college. He was created D.D. at Cambridge in 1594.

In 1611 Bownde became minister of the church of St. Andrew the Apostle at Norwich, and he was buried there on 26 December 1613. He married the widow of John More, the 'apostle of Norwich.' His sister Anne married John Dod and his widowed mother married as her second husband Richard Greenham.

== Works ==
In 1595 Bownde published the first edition of his treatise on Sabbath. In it he maintained that the seventh part of our time ought to be devoted to the service of God; that Christians are bound to rest on the first day of the week as much as the Jews were on Mosaical Sabbath. He contended that Sabbath was profaned by interludes, May-games, morris dances, shooting, bowling, and similar sports; and he would not allow any feasting on that day, though an exception was made in favour of 'noblemen and great personages'.

The observance of the Lord's Day became a question between the high-church party and the puritans, an early disagreement on doctrine. The Sabbatarian question was noticed by the bishops, and they cited several ministers before the ecclesiastical courts for preaching it. But the strict Sabbatarian doctrine spread.

His works are:

- 'Three godly and fruitfull Sermons, declaring how we may be saved in the day of Judgement. . . . Preached and written by M. John More, late Preacher in the Citie of Norwitch. And now first published by M. Nicholas Bound, whereto he hath adjoined of his owne, A Sermon of Comfort for the Afflicted; and a short treatise of a contented mind,' Cambridge, 1594.
- 'The Doctrine of the Sabbath, plainely layde forth, and soundly proued by testimonies both of holy Scripture, and also of olde and new ecclesiastical writers. . . . Together with the sundry abuses of our time in both these kindes, and how they ought to bee reformed,' London, 1595. Dedicated to Robert Devereux, 2nd Earl of Essex. This work was attacked by Thomas Rogers in 1599. Reprinted, with additions, under the title of 'Sabbathvm veteris et novi Testamenti: or the true doctrine of the Sabbath . . ., ' London, 1606.
- 'Medicines for the Plagve: that is, Godly and fruitfull Sermons vpon part of the twentieth Psalme . . . more particularly applied to this late visitation of the Plague,' London, 1604.
- 'The Holy Exercise of Fasting. Described largely and plainly out of the word of God. ... In certaine Homilies or Sermons . . ., ' Cambridge, 1604. Dedicated to John Jegon, bishop of Norwich.
- 'The Vnbeliefe of St. Thomas the Apostle, laid open for the comfort of all that desire to beleeue . . ., ' London, 1608, reprinted, London, 1817.
- A Treatise ful of Consolation for all that are afflicted in minde or bodie or otherwise ..., Cambridge, 1608; reprinted, London, 1817. The reprints of this and the preceding work were edited by G. W. Marriot.

Bownde has a Latin ode before Peter Baro's Prælectiones in Ionam, 1579; and he edited John More's Table from the Beginning of the World to this Day. Wherein is declared in what yeere of the World everything was done, Cambridge, 1593.
