= Richard Greenham =

16th-century English clergyman

Richard Greenham (also Grenham) (1535?–1594?) was an English clergyman of Puritan views, well known for his strong Puritan doctrine of the Sabbath. His many sermons and theological treatises had a significant influence on the Puritan movement in England.

== Life ==
He was probably born about 1535, and went at a late age to the University of Cambridge where he matriculated as a sizar of Pembroke Hall on 27 May 1559. He graduated B.A. early in 1564, and was elected Fellow, proceeding M.A. in 1567. His Puritanism was moderate: he had scruples about vestments, and strong views about such abuses as non-residence, but was more concerned for the substance of religion and the co-operation of all religious men within the Church than for theories of ecclesiastical government. His name, 'Richardus Grenham,' is appended with twenty-one others to the letters (3 July and 11 Aug. 1570), asking Lord Burghley, the Chancellor, to reinstate Thomas Cartwright in his office as Lady Margaret's divinity reader. Daniel Neal's statement that at a subsequent period he declared his approbation of Cartwright's 'book of discipline' (1584) is somewhat suspect; but John Strype says he was at one of Cartwright's synods.

On 24 November 1570 he was instituted to the rectory of Dry Drayton, Cambridgeshire. He served there for 20 years. He also preached at St Mary's, Cambridge, where he reproved young divines for engaging in controversies, as tantamount to rearing a roof before laying a foundation. In his parish he preached frequently, choosing the earliest hours of the morning for sermon before the work of the day. He devoted Sunday evenings and Thursday mornings to catechizing; he was also known for giving pastoral and spiritual counselling to those who were in need of comfort. He had some divinity pupils, including Henry Smith.

During a period of dearth, when barley was ten groats a bushel, he devised a plan for selling corn cheap to the poor, no family being allowed to buy more than three pecks in a week. He cheapened his straw, preached against the public order for lessening the capacity of the bushel, and got into trouble by refusing to let the clerk of the market cut down his measure with the rest. His unworldliness meant that his wife had to borrow money to pay his harvestmen. Richer livings were steadily declined by him. Nevertheless, he was not appreciated by his flock.

He was cited for nonconformity by Richard Cox, bishop of Ely; Cox asked him whether the guilt of schism lay with conformists or with nonconformists. Greenham answered that, if both parties acted in a spirit of concord, it would lie with neither; otherwise with those who made the rent. Cox gave him no further trouble. His Apologie or Aunswere is in A Parte of a Register (1593), p. 86 sq.

When the Marprelate tracts were published in 1589, he preached against them at St. Mary's, on the ground that their tendency was 'to make sin ridiculous, whereas it ought to be made odious.' His friends were anxious to get him to London. He resigned his post at Cambridgeshire in 1591, having held it for about twenty years. He told Warfield, his successor, 'I perceive noe good wrought by my ministerie on any but one familie.' He settled as preacher at Christ Church, Newgate.

His Treatise of the Sabboth, was published around 1592. Thomas Fuller said that 'no book in that age made greater impression on peoples practice.'

In 1599 Joseph Hall wrote a poem in tribute to Greenham. The poem was entitled Upon Greenham’s ‘Sabbath’ . It was the earliest of the Puritan treatises on the observance of the Lord's day, more moderate than the 'Sabbathvm' (1595) of his step-son Nicholas Bownde, who borrowed from Greenham.

Greenham was one of the most famous and well known Elizabethan Puritan ministers of his time, and close friends with other great Puritan divines, such as Laurence Chaderton, Richard Rogers, and William Perkins. Greenham had a significant influence on the rise of English Puritanism through his many sermons and theological treatises.

== Death ==
Samuel Clarke says Greenham died about 1591, in about his sixtieth year, while Fuller says his death was unrecorded, because he died of the plague which raged in 1592. It is mentioned by Waddington that on 2 April 1593 Greenham visited John Penry in the Poultry Compter. Henry Holland implies that he survived the affair of Lopez, February–June 1594.

== Works ==
Greenham's Workes were collected and edited by Henry Holland. A first edition appeared in 1599; a second edition appeared in the same year; the third edition was 1601, reprinted 1605 and 1612 ('fift and last' edition). A Garden of Spiritual Flowers, by Greenham, was published 1612, and several times reprinted, till 1687. It is doubtful whether Greenham himself published anything, or left anything ready for the press.

Of his Treatise of the Sabboth, which had been circulated privately, Holland found three copies, and edited the best. It was originally a sermon or sermons; and the remaining works (excepting a catechism) are made up from sermon material, with some additions from Greenham's conversation.

He also wrote Reading and understanding the scriptures.

Other publications include;

- A godlie exhortation, and fruitfull admonition to vertuous parents and modest matrons, 1584
- A fruitful and Godly sermon, 1595
- A most sweete and assured comfort, 1595
- Propositions containing answers to certaine demaunds in divers spirituall matters, 1597

== Family ==
The Dictionary of National Biography states that he married the widow of Rev. Nicholas Bownde; however, Nicholas died in 1613, so this is highly unlikely.

It appears that he married Nicholas’s mother, who was the widow of Robert Bownde, M.D., physician to the Duke of Norfolk.

Greenham and his wife had no children, but his stepdaughter, Anne Bownde, was the first wife of John Dod.

== Notes ==
Attribution

This article incorporates text from a publication now in the public domain: "Greenham, Richard". Dictionary of National Biography. London: Smith, Elder & Co. 1885–1900.
