= Christopher Tesdale =

17th century English theologian

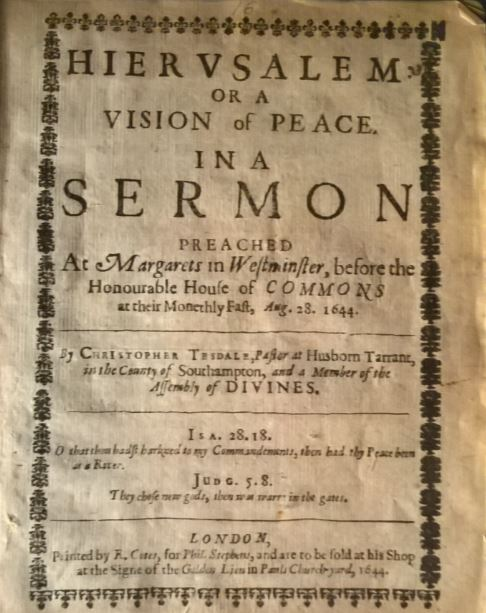
- Christopher Tesdale's sermon Hierusalem or A vision of peace 1644
- Born: c. 1592; Abingdon
- Died: c. 1655

Christopher Tesdale (c.1592 – c.1655) was a member of the Westminster Assembly of Divines from 1643 to 1649 and a Canon of Chichester and Wells.

== Early life and education ==
He was a born into the influential Tesdale family of Abingdon around c.1592. He was educated at John Roysse's Free School in Abingdon, (now Abingdon School). He later studied at New College, Oxford gaining a Master of Arts, on 19 June 1618 and then was a fellow of Pembroke College, Oxford.

== Career ==
His was the pastor at Hurstbourne Tarrant and was a supporter of the parliament during the English Civil War. He became a member of the Westminster Assembly of Divines, from 1643 to 1649 and was a Canon of Chichester and Wells. He was the cousin of Thomas Tesdale and was tasked as valuer, witness and keeper of Thomas' will in addition to receiving. Christopher was given payments in the will for the remainder of his live.

His sermon 'Hierusalem: or A vision of peace' held at St Margaret's, Westminster, before the House of Commons on 28 August 1644 was published by Richard Cotes of London.

== See also ==
- List of Old Abingdonians
- List of members of the Westminster Assembly
