= William Spurstowe =

English clergyman and theologian (d. 1666)

William Spurstowe (Spurstow) (c. 1605–1666) was an English clergyman, theologian, and member of the Westminster Assembly. He was one of the Smectymnuus group of Presbyterian clergy, supplying the final WS (read as UUS) of the acronym.

== Life ==
His father William Spurstow was a mercer in London. The son studied at Emmanuel College, Cambridge.

He became a Fellow of St. Katherine's Hall College, Cambridge in 1638, during the Mastership of Ralph Brownrigg, and succeeded as Master in 1645. At the time it was strongly Puritan in tone, with John Arrowsmith, John Bond, Thomas Goodwin, Andrew Perne and William Strong as other Fellows.

In the late 1630s he was an associate of John Hampden, and in 1638 he became vicar of Great Hampden. Later he was chaplain to Hampden's troops.

He became vicar of Hackney in 1643, and was made Master of his college. He was deprived of the mastership, in 1650.

After the Restoration, he was consulted on the Declaration of Indulgence. He was ejected from his parish of Hackney for nonconformity, in 1662. He remained in Hackney, welcomed Richard Baxter, employed Ezekiel Hopkins, and provided a focus for numerous other ejected ministers. He built six almshouses there, work starting shortly before his death.

== Works ==
- Englands Patterne and Duty in Its Monthly Fasts (1643)
- Englands eminent judgments, caus'd by the abuse of Gods eminent mercies (1644)
- The Magistrate's Dignity and Duty (1653)
- The Wels of Salvation Opened. London: T.R. & E.M. 1655.
- Death and the Grave No Bar to Believers Happinesse (1656)
- A Crown of Life, the Reward of Faithfulnesse (1662)
- The Spiritual Chymist; Or, Six Decads of Divine Meditations on Several Subjects. 1666.
- The Wiles of Satan. 1666.
- Tract Entitled True and Faithful Relation of a Worthy Discourse: Between Colonel John Hampden and Colonel Oliver Cromwell. Chapman and Hall. 1847.

== Notes ==
Academic offices
Preceded by Ralph Brownrigg	Master of St Catharine's College, Cambridge; 1645-1650	Succeeded by John Lightfoot
