= List of Puritan poets =

Puritanism, begun in England in the 17th century, was a radical Protestant movement to reform the Church of England. Puritans were amongst the first poets in the American colonies. Puritan poets such as John Milton, Anne Bradstreet and Edward Taylor produced some of the best-known verse of their age. Hyatt Howe Waggoner noted, "The Puritans valued poetry for its usefulness—but not in any crude utilitarian sense. They would not have understood an art for art'ssake doctrine, not because they had contempt for art but because for them life was all of a piece and lower values should properly be suordinated to higher ones. The use of poetry was to help one to live well—and die well."

Following are some of the Puritan poets.

- Joel Barlow
- Richard Baxter
- Anne Bradstreet (1612–1672), considered by many scholars to be the first American poet, emigrated to Salem, Massachusetts in 1630. She had no formal education but had constant tutoring provided by her abusive father. Her collection of poems, "The Tenth Muse Lately Sprung Up In America" (1650), was the first published work by a woman in America and England.
- John Bunyan
- Richard Crashaw
- Samuel Danforth
- Timothy Dwight IV
- John Dryden (1631–1700) was a highly influential English poet during the Restoration period in England. His first published poem, "Heroique Stanzas" (1658), was the eulogy for the Lord Protector of England, Oliver Cromwell. His poems often contained factual information and sought to express his thoughts in a precise way. His other published poems include: "Hidden Flame," "Mac Flecknoe," "One Happy Moment," "A Song for St. Cecelia's Day," "Song for Amphitryon," "Song to a Fair Young Lady, Going Out of the Town in the Spring" and "To the Memory of Mr. Oldham."
- Owen Felltham
- Joseph Hall
- Lucy Hutchinson
- Morgan Llwyd
- Andrew Marvell
- Cotton Mather
- Thomas May
- John Milton (1608–1674), most famous for his epic poem "Paradise Lost" (1667), was an English poet with religious beliefs emphasizing central Puritanical views. While the work acted as an expression of his despair over the failure of the Puritan Revolution against the English Catholic Church, it also indicated his optimism in human potential. A sequel entitled "Paradise Regained" was published in 1671. Other notable published works by Milton include, "On Shakespeare" (1630), "Comus" (1637), "Lycidas" (1638), and the tragedy "Samson Agonistes" (1671).
- Thomas Morton
- Edward Taylor (c. 1642 to 1729) emigrated to America in 1662 in defiance of the restoration of the English monarchy. A Harvard-educated minister, Taylor did not write his poems for publication but as a private act to prepare for each holy communion. His poems were not discovered until the early 20th century; they were published in 1937. His most famous work, Preparatory Meditations Before My Approach to the Lord's Supper, was a collection of personal thoughts and insights he gained while writing sermons.
- Thomas Tillam
- Benjamin Tompson
- John Wilson
- Michael Wigglesworth
- George Wither
- Roger Wolcott
