= John Dod =

English clergyman

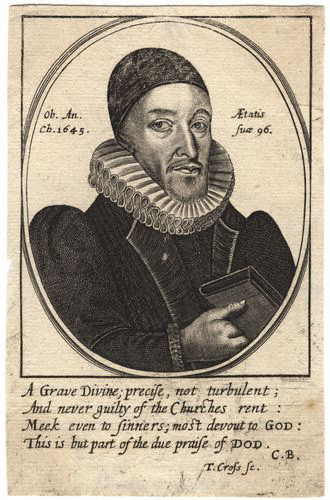
John Dod

John Dod (c. 1549 – 1645), known as "Decalogue Dod", was a non-conforming English clergyman, taking his nickname for his emphasis on the Ten Commandments. He is known for his widely circulated writings. Although he lost one means of livelihood because of Puritan beliefs, he had important support from sympathetic members of the Puritan gentry throughout a long career.

== Life ==
He was born in Malpas, Cheshire, the youngest of the 17 children of John Dod, of Shocklach, Cheshire. His parents were possessed of a moderate estate, and after he had received his early education at Westchester sent him when about fourteen to Jesus College, Cambridge, where he was elected scholar and afterwards fellow. He was a learned man, a Hebraist, and, it is said, witty and cheerful.

He was vicar of Hanwell, Oxfordshire, from 1585, in the gift of Anthony Cope, also preaching at Banbury. Robert Cleaver, his co-author, was in a neighbouring parish, Drayton.

Dod was ejected from his parish at Hanwell in 1607. From 1608 he was at Canons Ashby and then rector of Fawsley, where his patron was Richard Knightley. A false accusation brought against him of having defrauded the college of a sum of money due from one of his pupils was the cause of a fever which almost cost him his life. During his illness he received strong religious impressions, and after his recovery, his character being fully cleared, he preached at a weekly lecture set up by some 'godly' people of Ely. When he was probably past thirty he was instituted to the living of Hanwell, Oxfordshire, where he remained for twenty years. While there he married Anne, sister of Dr. Nicholas Bownde, by whom he had twelve children. The John Dod, proctor of the University of Cambridge in 1615, was probably one of his sons, though it is suggested that he was Dod himself (Memorials). His second wife was a Miss Chilton. At Hanwell he worked diligently, preaching twice each Sunday besides catechising and supplying, in conjunction with four others, a weekly lectureship at Banbury.

In 1624 he was presented to the rectory of Fawsley in the same county, where he remained until his death. In the course of the civil war he is said to have been troubled by the royalist soldiers. He died at Fawsley, and was there buried on 19 August 1645.

When told, "his preaching was so searching, that some supposed he had informers to tell him of men's actions, because he touched them so close," he answered, that the word was searching, and that if he was shut up in the dark where none could come at him, yet allow him but a Bible and a candle, he would preach as he did.

== Writings ==
A Godly Form of Household Government, a leading conduct book for decades, developed from a 1598 pamphlet by his co-author Robert Cleaver. It took material from a sermon published in 1591, A Preparative for Marriage by Henry Smith. Dod knew Henry Smith from Dry Drayton, and he helped expand the work in its many later editions. It is based on the family as unit. The 12 page Celebrated Sayings of Old Mr Dodd remained popular for many years. It contains pithy and memorable Christian advice and a witty yet sobering Sermon on Malt delivered to some Cambridge students who had waylaid him.

== Works ==
- A Godly Form of Householde Government (editions after 1598) with Robert Cleaver
- A Plaine and Familiar Exposition of the Tenne Commandements
- Commentaries on Proverbs
- Old Mr. Dod’s Sayings, printed by Anne Maxwell, (1671)

== Family ==
He married first Anne Bownde, stepdaughter of Richard Greenham, daughter of the physician Robert Bownde, and sister of Nicholas Bownde the Sabbatarian. They had 12 children; he remarried after her death.

John Wilkins was a grandson, and succeeded him at Fawsley in 1637. Timothy Dod (d. 1665), an ejected minister in 1662, was a son.
