= William Pemble =

English theologian and author

William Pemble (Pember) (1591 or 1592–1623) was an English theologian and author.

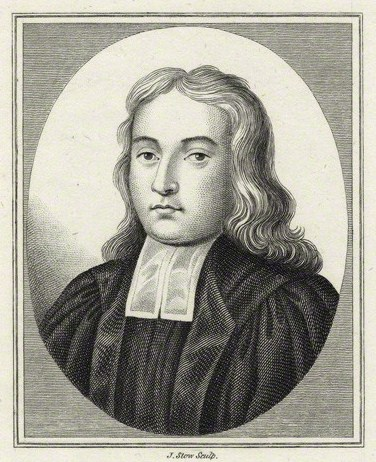
William Pemble, 1817 engraving by James Stow

== Biography ==
A student of Richard Capel at Magdalen College, Oxford, Pemble became reader and tutor at Magdalen. All of Pemble's works were published posthumously.

== Works ==
- Vindiciae fidei, 1625
- Vindiciae gratiae, 1627
- Salomons Recantation and Repentance, 1627
- An Introduction to the Worthy Receiving the Sacrament, 1628
- De formarum origine, 1629
- De sensibus internis, 1629
- A Short and Sweet Exposition upon the First Nine Chapters of Zachary, 1629
- A Summe of Morall Philosophy, 1630
- A Briefe Introduction to Geography, 1630
- Tractatus de providentia Dei, 1631
- The Period of the Persian Monarchie , 1631
