= Henry Holland (priest) =

English Church of England priest and writer

Henry Holland (1556–1603) was an English Church of England priest, known for his writing on witchcraft.

== Life ==
He was educated at Magdalene College, Cambridge, where he graduated Bachelor of Arts (BA) in 1580. He was instituted to the vicarage of Orwell, Cambridgeshire, on 21 November 1580. In 1583 he commenced Cambridge Master of Arts (MA Cantab), and on 13 February 1594 was instituted to the vicarage of St Bride's Church in the City of London, on the presentation of the dean and chapter of Westminster Abbey. This benefice was vacant by his death before 13 February 1604.

== Works ==
Holland was the author of A Treatise against Witchcraft (1590). It was directed from a Calvinist point of view against folk magic and the sceptical arguments of Discoverie of Witchcraft by Reginald Scot; it also introduced arguments from the writings of Jean Bodin, Lambert Daneau and Niels Hemmingsen.

Other works were

- ‘Spirituall Preseruatiues against the Pestilence: chiefly collected out of the 91 Psalme,’ London, 1593; 1603; dedicated to the lord mayor, sheriffs, and aldermen, and Thomas Aldersey, citizen, of London. To the second edition is added ‘An Admonition concerning the use of Physick,’ which was reprinted with ‘Salomon's Pesthouse’ (1630), by I. D.
- ‘Aphorisms of Christian Religion: or a verie compendious abridgement of M. I. Caluin's Institutions, set forth in short sentences methodically by M. I. Piscator: And now Englished according to the Authors third and last edition,’ London, 1596, with dedication to Gabriel Goodman, dean of Westminster.
- ‘Christian exercise of Fasting, Private and Publick: whereunto is added certain Meditations on the 1st and 2d chapters of the Book of Job,’ London, 1596.

Holland also edited (London, by Felix Kyngston, 1603) ‘Lectures upon the Epistles of Paul to the Colossians,’ by Robert Rollok of Edinburgh, and the works of Richard Greenham (1599; 5th ed. 1612).
