= Allesley Green =

Coordinates: 52.419642°N 1.575174°W

- Location within the West Midlands
- OS grid reference: SP286802
- Metropolitan borough: Coventry
- Metropolitan county: West Midlands
- Region: West Midlands
- Country: England
- Sovereign state: United Kingdom
- Post town: COVENTRY
- Postcode district: CV5
- Dialling code: 024
- Police: West Midlands
- Fire: West Midlands
- Ambulance: West Midlands
- UK Parliament: Coventry North West

Allesley Green is a suburb of Coventry in the West Midlands, England, within the civil parish of Allesley.

The suburb lies west of the A45 road and is approximately 3.25 miles (5.23 km) west-northwest of Coventry city centre. Most of the housing dates from the late-1980s. It is bounded by the districts of Eastern Green to the southwest, Mount Nod to the south and Allesley Park to the east.
