= Richard Capel =

English nonconforming clergyman

Richard Capel (1586–1656) was an English nonconforming clergyman of Calvinist views, a member of the Westminster Assembly, and for a period of his life a practicing physician.

== Life ==
He was born at Gloucester, the son of Christopher Capel, an alderman of the city, and his wife Grace, daughter of Richard Hands. His father was a good friend to ministers who had suffered for nonconformity. Richard was educated in Gloucester, and became a commoner of St. Alban Hall, Oxford, in 1601. He was afterwards elected a demy of Magdalen College, and in 1609 was made perpetual fellow there, being then M.A.

During his residence at the university he was much consulted by Calvinists, and his pupils included Accepted Frewen and William Pember. In the reign of James I he attended at court on Robert Carr, 1st Earl of Somerset, and continued there till the death of his friend Sir Thomas Overbury. In 1613 he was instituted to the rectory of Eastington, Stroud, presented by Nathaniel Stephens. In 1633, when the Book of Sports of James I was published the second time by royal authority, he declined to read it in his church, and voluntarily resigned his rectory where he was succeeded by William Mew.

Capel obtained a licence to practise physic from Godfrey Goodman, the bishop of Gloucester. He now settled at Pitchcombe, near Stroud, where he had an estate. In 1643 he became a member of the Westminster Assembly. He died at Pitchcombe on 21 September 1656.

== Works ==
Capel was the author of:

- God's Valuation of Man's Soul, in two sermons on Mark viii. 36, London, 1632.
- Tentations: their Nature, Danger, Cure, to which is added a Briefe Dispute, as touching Restitution in the Case of Usury, London, 1633; second edition, London, 1635; third edition, London, 1636-7; sixth edition, consisting of five parts, 1658-55. The fourth part was published at London, 1633. The 'Brief Dispute' was answered by T. P., London, 1679.
- Apology in Defence of Some Exceptions against some Particulars in the Book of Tentations, London, 1659.
- Capel's Remains, being a useful Appendix to his excellent Treatise of Tentations, with a preface prefixed, wherein is contained an Abridgment of the author's life, by his friend, Valentine Marshall, London, 1658.

He edited some of the theological treatises composed by his favourite pupil William Pemble (Pember), who died in his house at Eastington in 1628.

== Family ==
He married Dorothy, daughter of William Plumstead of Plumstead, Norfolk (she died 14 September 1622, aged 28). His son, Daniel Capel, M.A., was successively minister of Morton, Alderley, and Shipton Moigne in Gloucestershire; he was ejected from Shipton Moigne in 1662 for nonconformity, and he practised medicine at Stroud until his death.
