= Theophilus Brabourne =

English Puritan clergyman and theological writer

Theophilus Brabourne (1590–1662) was an English Puritan clergyman and theological writer on the Christian Sabbath.

== Early life ==
Brabourne was a native of Norwich. The date of his birth is fixed by his own statement in 1654: 'I am 64 yeares of age'. His father was a Puritan hosier. He was educated at the Norwich Grammar School till he was fifteen years of age, and intended him for the church. When the youth should have gone to the University of Cambridge, the silencing of many Puritan ministers for non-compliance with the ceremonies of the Church of England induced the father to take his son into his own business.

Brabourne was sent to London, as a factor for selling stockings wholesale. He remained in London till his marriage. Brabourne then lived for two or three years at Norwich with his father, and resuming his intention of entering the ministry, he studied privately. He proceeded M.A. in 1621, and in the same year was ordained by Thomas Dove; he served as a curate at Catton, Norfolk.;

== Legal troubles ==
Brabourne held a conference, lasting 'many days, an houre or two in a day,' at Ely House, Holborn, with Francis White (bishop of Norwich 1629–31, of Ely 1631-8). This was the beginning of his troubles with the high commission court, over a period of three years. He was in the Gatehouse Prison at Westminster for nine weeks, and was then publicly examined before the high commission. The king's advocate pleaded against him, and Bishop White spoke for about an hour on his errors. Sir Henry Marten moved to sue the king to issue a writ de hæretico comburendo, but William Laud interposed. Brabourne was censured, and sent to Newgate Prison, where he remained eighteen months.

When he had been a year in prison, Brabourne was again examined before Laud, who told him that if he had stopped with what he said of the Lord's day, namely that it is not a sabbath of divine institution, but a holy day of the church, 'we should not have troubled you.' Brabourne's book was one of the reasons which moved Charles I to reissue on 18 October 1633 the Book of Sports; it was by the king's command that Bishop White wrote his 'Treatise of the Sabbath Day,' 1635, in the dedication of which (to Laud) is a short account of Brabourne.

== Later life ==
Returning to Norwich in 1635, Brabourne probably resumed his ministry; but he got some property on the death of a brother, and thenceforth gave up preaching. In 1654 he writes in his reply to John Collinges, formerly of St. Saviour's, then of St. Stephen's, Norwich, 'I have left the pulpit to you for many years past, and I think I may promise you never to come in it again.' Collinges was a bitter antagonist of his non-presbyterian neighbours.

After the Restoration, Brabourne put out pamphlets rejoicing in liberty of conscience, and defending the royal supremacy in ecclesiastical matters. In these pamphlets he spells his name Brabourn. The last of them was issued 18 March 1661. Nothing is known of Brabourne later.

== Views ==
In 1628 appeared Brabourne's Discourse upon the Sabbath Day, in which he impugns the received doctrine of the sabbatical character of the Lord's day, and maintains that Saturday is still the sabbath. Robert Cox regarded him as "the founder in England of the sect at first known as Sabbatarians, but now calling themselves seventh-day baptists". In the Dictionary of National Biography, Alexander Gordon contradicted Cox, stating that Brabourne was no baptist, founded no sect, and, true to the original Puritan standpoint, wrote vehemently against all separatists from the national church, and in favour of the supremacy of the civil power in matters ecclesiastical.

Brabourne's attention had been drawn to the Sabbath question by a work published at Oxford in 1621 by Thomas Broad, a Gloucestershire clergyman, Three Questions concerning the obligations of the Fourth Commandment. Broad rested the authority of the Lord's day on the custom of the early church and the constitution of the church of England. Brabourne left it to every man's conscience whether he will keep the sabbath or the Lord's day, but decided that those who prefer the former are on the safe side. He took stronger Sabbatarian ground in his Defence ... of the Sabbath Day, 1632, a work which he had the boldness to dedicate to Charles I. Before to this publication he held discussions on the subject with several puritan ministers in his neighbourhood, and claimed to have always come off victorious.

Ultimately, Brabourne made his submission to the high commission court. The document is called a recantation, but when safe from the clutches of the court, Brabourne explained that all he had actually retracted was the word "necessarily". He had affirmed "that Saturday ought necessarily to be our sabbath"; this he admitted to be a "rash and presumptuous error", for his opinion, though true, was not 'a necessary truth.'

Brabourne wrote in 1653 The Change of Church-Discipline, a tract against sectaries of all sorts. This stirred Collings to attack him in Indoctus Doctor Edoctus, &c. 1654. A second part of Brabourne's tract provoked A New Lesson for the Indoctus Doctor, &c., 1654, to which Brabourne wrote a Second Vindication in reply. Collings stated that Brabourne, after leaving the ministry, had tried several employments. He had been bolt-poake, weaver, hosier, maltster (in St. Augustine's parish), and was now "a nonsensical scribbler", who was forced to publish his books at his own expense. While this dispute with Collings was going on, Brabourne brought out an Answer to the Sabbatum Redivivum, &c., of Daniel Cawdrey, rector of Great Billing, Northamptonshire. Cawdrey was dissatisfied with White's treatment of the question in answer to Brabourne; and Brabourne was unconvinced by Cawdrey. Five years later was he wrote on his favourite theme against Ives and Warren.

== Works ==
Brabourne published:

- A Discourse upon the Sabbath Day … Printed the 23th [sic] of Decemb. anno dom. 1628. Brabourne maintained that the duration of the sabbath is "that space of time and light from day-peep or day-break in the morning, until day be quite off the sky at night".
- A Defence of that most ancient and sacred Ordinance of God's, the Sabbath Day. … Undertaken against all Anti-Sabbatharians, both of Protestants, Papists, Antinomians, and Anabaptists; and by name and especially against these X Ministers, M. Greenwood, M. Hutchinson, M. Furnace, M. Benton, M. Gallard, M. Yates, M. Chappel, M. Stinnet, M. Johnson, and M. Wade. The second edition, corrected and amended; with a supply of many things formerly omitted. … 1632 (according to Robert Watt, the first edition was in 1631, and there was another edition in 1660. Here "M. Stinnet" is Edward Stennett of Abingdon, father of Joseph Stennett; he was a physician and Baptist, in the congregation of John Pendarves, and adopted sabbatarian views in the 1650s. He published The Royal Law contended for, &c., 1658.
- The Change of Church-Discipline, 1653.
- The Second Part of the Change of Church-Disciple … Also a Reply to Mr. Collins his answer made to Mr. Brabourne's first part of the Change of Church-Discipline … 1654, (the reply has a separate title-page and pagination, A Reply to the "Indoctus Doctor Edoctus," 1654).
- The Second Vindication of my first Book of the Change of Discipline; being a Reply to Mr. Collings his second Answer to it. Also a Dispute between Mr. Collings and T. Brabourne touching the Sabbath Day.
- An Answer to M. Cawdry's two books of the Sabbath lately come forth, &c, 1654.
- Answers to two books on the Sabbath: the one by Mr. Ives, entitled Saturday no Sabbath Day; the other by Mr. Warren, the Jews' Sabbath antiquated, 1659. Jeremy Ives's book was published 1659; Edmund Warren's (of Colchester) was also published 1659.
- God save the King, and prosper him and his Parliament … 1660 (published 9 August.)
- The Humble Petition of Theophilus Brabourn unto the hon. Parliament, that, as all magistrates in the Kingdome doe in their office, so Bishops may be required in their office to own the King's supremacy, &c. 1661, published 5 March. There is A Postscript, [sic] Of many evils [sic] which follow upon the King's grant to Bishops of a coercive power in their courts for ceremonies.
- Of the Lawfulness [sic] of the Oath of allegiance to the King, and of the other oath to his supremacy. Written for the benefit of Quakers and others, who out of scruple of conscience, refuse the oath of allegiance and supremacy, 1661, published 18 March.

== Family ==
Brabourne married Abigail, daughter of Roger and Joane Galliard. He was thus brother-in-law of Benjamin Fairfax who married Sarah Galliard.
