= Humphrey Fenn =

Humphrey Fenn (died 1634), was an English puritan divine.

== Life ==
Fenn was matriculated as sizar of Queens' College, Cambridge, on 12 November 1568, and graduated B.A. in 1573. He migrated to Peterhouse, and graduated M.A. in 1576. In the same year he began his ministry at Northampton, and at once got into trouble for his nonconformity, and was committed to gaol. The inhabitants of Northampton petitioned Queen Elizabeth I for his release, giving him a high character as a preacher and a loyal subject.

On 21 Feb. 1578 he succeeded Anthony Fletcher as vicar of Holy Trinity, Coventry, and became a prominent man in the party headed by Thomas Cartwright (1535–1603). At the request of the London puritans he accompanied the Earl of Leicester to represent their grievances to the queen. On the issue of Whitgift's three articles (1583), he refused to subscribe. He was cited to Lambeth (1584), and suspended. An account of his examination is given by Brook, from Roger Morrice's manuscript. His place was taken by ‘one Griffen, a Welchman,’ between whom and Fenn, according to the manuscript city annals, there was ‘a great contention’ for the vicarage in 1584 or 1585. Fenn was restored to his vicarage shortly after 14 July 1585, through the intercession of Leicester. But in 1590 he was again suspended, owing to the active part which he took in the ‘associations’ of the Warwickshire puritan divines, was committed to the Fleet by the high commission, with Cartwright and others, and, refusing the purgation by oath, was deprived.

His successor, Richard Eaton, was instituted on 12 Jan. 1591. On 13 May Fenn and his companions were brought before the Star Chamber. Articles, dealing mainly with their ‘book of discipline,’ were exhibited against them. They denied that in their ‘associations’ they exercised any jurisdiction, or meddled with sedition. Fenn ‘seemed more stiff than Cartwright.’ The Star-chamber remanded them without bail. James VI of Scotland interceded (12 June) for their release; on 4 Dec. they petitioned for bail; Fenn's signature stands second in the list, immediately after Cartwright's. In April 1592 they again petitioned for release, this time successfully. (Leicester's letter of thanks is dated 21 May.)

Fenn returned to Coventry, and resumed his ministry, probably preaching only on week-days. On 24 April 1624 ‘Mr. Humphrey Fenn, preacher,’ was appointed to the Sunday lectureship at St. John the Baptist's (Bablake). This was a new lectureship; the church, which had been in ruins, was repaired in 1608, and a week-day lectureship established in favour of John Oxenbridge. In 1626 or soon after ‘old Mr. Fenn’ joined with the mayor and leading citizens in inviting Samuel Clarke (1599–1683), the martyrologist, to become a lecturer at Coventry. This is the last notice of Fenn. Tong says that he ‘spent above forty years’ with the Coventry people; we must correct this to ‘above fifty,’ even if we deduct his enforced absences. He died early in 1633–4, and was buried on 8 Feb. in Holy Trinity churchyard, Coventry. He seems to have had a son and grandson of the same name.

His will, made in 1631, was prefaced by ‘so full and so open a protestation against the hierarchy and the ceremonies, that the prelatical party would not suffer it to be put among the records of the court when the will was tendred to be proved’ (Clark, in Life of Julines Herring). On 21 Feb. 1634 a copy of the introduction to the will of ‘Humphrey Fen the eldest’ was received by Archbishop Laud from the bishop of Coventry and Lichfield. This preamble (only) was printed as ‘The Last Will and Testament with the Profession of Faith of Humphrey Fenn,’ &c., 1641, sm. 8vo (no place of printing).
