= William Strong (priest, died 1654) =

English clergyman

William Strong (ca. 1611–1654) was an English clergyman and then pastor of an independent congregation, and member of the Westminster Assembly.

== Life ==
He was born in Dorset, and was educated at Cambridge, graduating B.A. from St. Catharine Hall, of which he was elected a fellow on 30 December 1631. In 1640 he became rector of Moore Critchell in Dorset, but he was driven out in 1643, when the royalists obtained the ascendancy in the county. He fled to London, where he met a cordial reception, and frequently preached before Parliament.

On 31 December 1645 the Commons appointed him as successor to Edward Peale in the Westminster Assembly, and on 14 October 1647 he became minister of St. Dunstan's-in-the-West, Fleet Street.. On 9 December 1650 he was chosen pastor to a congregation of independents, which comprised many members of parliament, and to which he preached in Westminster Abbey. On 29 July 1652 he was appointed to a committee for selecting preachers to go to Ireland. A sermon preached at Westminster in July 1653 'against the liberty of the times as introducing popery,' attracted some attention. He died in middle life in June 1654, and was buried in Westminster Abbey on 4 July; but on the Restoration his remains, with those of several others, were dug up and thrown into a pit in St. Margaret's churchyard. His widow Damaris survived him.

== Works ==
Strong was the author of:

- Clavis Apocalyptica ad incudem revocata, London, 1653.
- The Saints Communion with God, and Gods Communion with them in Ordinances, ed. Hering, London, 1656.
- Heavenly Treasure, or Man's Chiefest Good, ed. Howe, London 1656.
- Thirty-one Select Sermons, London, 1656.
- A Treatise showing the Subordination of the Will of Man to the Will of God, ed. Rowe, London, 1657.
- A Discourse on the Two Covenants, published by Theophilus Gale, London, 1678.

Strong also published several sermons, and wrote prefatory remarks to Robert Dingley's Spiritual Taste Described, London, 1649.
