= Ralph Brownrigg =

British bishop

The Right Reverend Ralph Brownrigg
- Bishop of Exeter
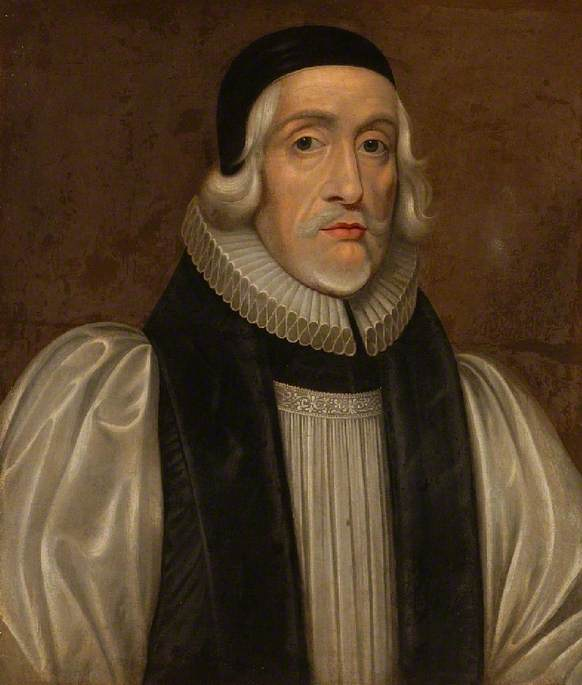
- Diocese: Diocese of Exeter
- In office: 1642–1646
- Predecessor: Joseph Hall
- Successor: John Gauden

Orders
- Consecration: 15 May 1642 by John Williams

Personal details
- Born: c. 1592
- Died: 7 December 1659
- Denomination: Anglican
- Education: Pembroke Hall, Cambridge

Ralph Brownrigg or Brownrig (1592–1659) was bishop of Exeter from 1642 to 1646. He spent that time largely in exile from his see, which he perhaps never visited. He did find a position there for Seth Ward. He was both a Royalist in politics, and a Calvinist in religion, an unusual combination of the period. Brownrigg opposed Laudianism in Cambridge during the 1630s and at the Short Parliament Convocation of 1640. Nominated to the Westminster Assembly, he apparently took no part in it.

== Life ==
He studied at Ipswich and Pembroke Hall, Cambridge. He was awarded an M.A. in 1614 and a D.D. in 1626. He was Rector of St Margaret of Antioch, Barley, Hertfordshire, in 1621.

He was Master of St Catharine's College, Cambridge, and Vice-Chancellor of the University of Cambridge, but in 1646 was ejected from both these positions, by the Parliamentary government. He was also deprived of his See by Parliament on 9 October 1646, as episcopacy was abolished for the duration of the Commonwealth and the Protectorate.

He took refuge with Thomas Rich, lord of the manor of Sonning.

== Works ==
He continued to preach, for example at the Temple Church, and a collection of sermons of his was published posthumously.

== Notes ==
Academic offices
Preceded by Richard Sibbes	Master of St Catharine's College, Cambridge; 1635–1645	Succeeded by William Spurstow
Church of England titles
Preceded by Joseph Hall	Bishop of Exeter; 1642–1646	Succeeded by John Gauden (at Restoration)
