= John More (minister) =

English clergyman

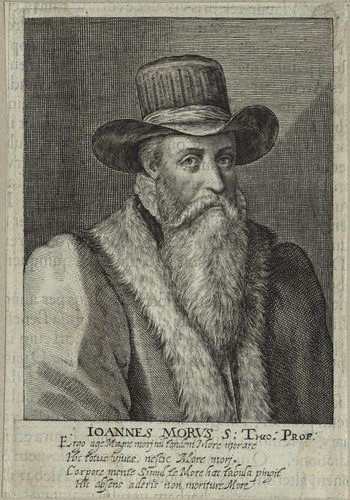
John More, engraving from 1620.

John More (died 1592) was an English clergyman, known as the 'Apostle of Norwich.' Tending to nonconformity, he was treated leniently by the church authorities.

== Life ==
Born in Yorkshire, he was elected a scholar of Christ's College, Cambridge, graduated B.A. in 1562, and was shortly afterwards chosen fellow of his college. During his Cambridge career he appears to have been influenced by Thomas Cartwright, and he was one of those who signed a testimonial to Cartwright addressed to William Cecil in 1570.

On leaving the university he was appointed minister of St. Andrew's Church, Norwich, where he remained until his death, in spite of offers of preferment.. He preached three and sometimes four times every Sunday, and made numerous converts. In 1573 he refused to wear the surplice, on the ground that it gave offence to others, and he was convened before John Parkhurst, bishop of Norwich, who told him that it was better to offend a few private persons than to offend God and disobey the prince. No severe measures were taken against him, and Parkhurst defended More to Archbishop Matthew Parker. In the same year More confuted a sermon preached by Andrew Perne in Norwich Cathedral, and a controversy grew up. Dr. Gardiner, one of the prebendaries of the cathedral, asked the bishop to interpose, and More was prevented from carrying out further attacks on Perne.

On 25 September 1576 More and other Puritan clergy round Norwich presented to the council a petition against the imposition of ceremonies, and he was shortly afterwards suspended by Bishop Edmund Freke. Two years afterwards (21 August 1578) More and his friends signed a submission to their diocesan bishop, asking to preach again, and softening their position on ceremonies. In 1584, after the publication of John Whitgift's three articles, More and upwards of sixty other ministers of Norfolk presented to the archbishop their reasons for refusing to subscribe.

More died at Norwich, and was buried in the churchyard of St. Andrew's on 16 January 1592. He left a wife, afterwards married to Nicholas Bownde, and two daughters. He is said to have worn the longest and largest beard of his time, for which he gave as a reason 'that no act of his life might be unworthy of the gravity of his appearance.' Robert Greene is generally supposed to mean More's preaching in his account of the manner in which he was influenced by a sermon he heard in St. Andrew's Church, Norwich.

== Works ==
More's works were all published after his death.

- A Table from the beginning of the World to this day. Wherein is declared in what yeere of the World everything was done, both in the Scriptures mentioned and also in prophane matters, Cambridge, 1593. Edited by Nicholas Bownde.

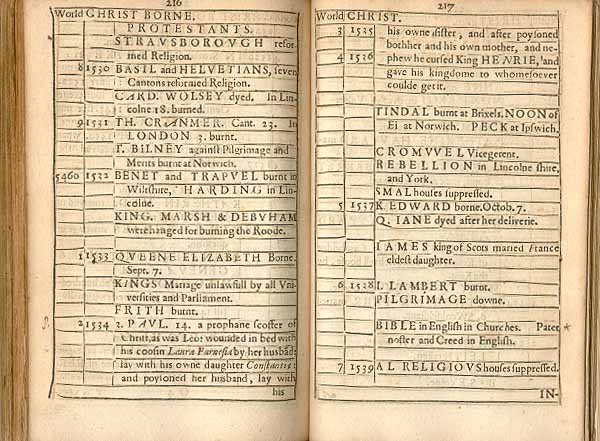
A Table from the beginning of the World, 1593.

- John More his three Sermons . . . Also a Treatise of a contented Minde, by Nich. Bownde, Cambridge, 1594.
- A Lively Anatomy of Death, wherein you may see from whence it came, what it is by Nature, and what by Christ, &c. With a prefatory Epistle by William Barforde, London, 1596.
- Catechismus Parvus.hell
