= Daniel Cawdry =

English clergyman

Daniel Cawdry (Cawdrey) (1588–1664) was an English clergyman, member of the Westminster Assembly, and ejected minister of 1662.

== Life ==
He was the youngest son of Robert Cawdry, and was educated at Sidney Sussex College and Peterhouse, Cambridge. From about 1617 to 1625 he was rector of Little Ilford. He was instituted to the living of Great Billing, Northamptonshire, in 1625, 'in the presentation of the king by wardship of Christopher Hatton, esq.' Along with James Cranford and William Castle, he preached often at Northampton.

He became one of the leading members of Westminster Assembly from 1643, and was vicar of St Martin-in-the-Fields in London from 1644 to 1648. He was one of the presbyterian ministers who signed the address to General Fairfax remonstrating against all personal violence against the king Charles I. At the Restoration he was recommended to Lord Clarendon for a bishopric. Instead he refused to submit to the Act of Uniformity 1662, and was ejected. He retired to Wellingborough, where he died in October 1664 in his seventy-sixth year.

== Works ==
He was a voluminous writer of controversial works, both against the Anglicans on the one side and the Independents on the other; and he took on both Henry Hammond and John Owen. He considered religious toleration "the last and most desperate design of Antichrist."

His works include:

- Sabbatum Redivivum; or, the Christian Sabbath vindicated, 1641 (with Herbert Palmer).
- The Good Man a Publick Good, 1643.
- The Inconsistency of the Independent Way with Scripture and itself, 1651.
- An Answer to Mr. Giles Firmin's Questions concerning Baptism, 1652.
- A Diatribe concerning Superstition, Will-worship, and the Christmas Festival, 1654.
- Independence, a Great Schism, proved against Dr. (John) Owen's Apology, 1657.
- Survey of Dr. Owen's Review of his Treatise on Schism, 1658.
- A Vindication of the Diatribe against Dr. Hammond; or, the Account audited and discounted, 1658,
- Bowing towards the Altar Superstitious; being an answer to Dr. Duncan's "Determination", 1661.

Theophilus Brabourne answered him on the Sabbatarian question.

He also published devotional works and sermons.
