= Robert Dingley (Roundhead) =

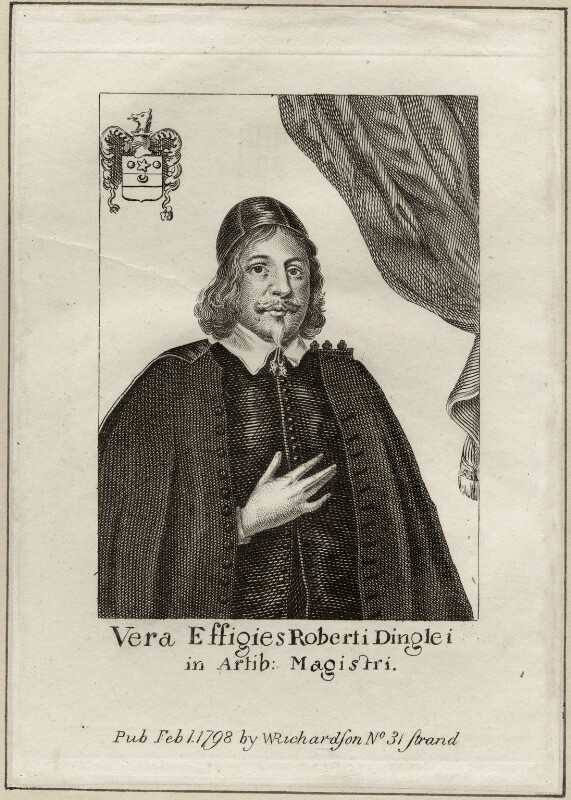
Robert Dingley, 1798 engraving

Robert Dingley (1619–1660), was an English puritan divine, who supported the Parliamentary cause in the English Civil War.

== Biography ==
Dingley, a second son of Sir John Dingley, and a sister of Dr. Henry Hammond, was born in 1619. In 1634 he entered Magdalen College, Oxford. Having finished his university career and taken his degree of M.A., he took holy orders.

On the outbreak of the civil war he took the parliamentary side. Dingley was presented to the rectory of Brightstone in the Isle of Wight during the governorship of his kinsman, Colonel Robert Hammond, and enjoyed a high reputation as a preacher. He gave active assistance to the commissioners of Hampshire in rejecting ignorant and scandalous ministers and schoolmasters. He died at Brightstone on 12 January 1660.

== Works ==
Dingley's works were:

1. The Spiritual Taste Described, or a Glimpse of Christ Discovered, 1649, republished as Divine Relishes of matchless Goodness, 1651.
2. The Deputation of Angels, 1654, London.
3. Messiah's Splendour, or the Glimpsed Glory of a Beauteous Christian, 1654.
4. Divine Optics, or a Treatise of the Eye discovering the Vices and Virtues thereof, 1655.
5. Vox Cœli, or Philosophicall, Historicall, and Theological Observations of Thunder, 1658.
6. A Sermon on Job xxvi. 14, 1658.

For expressing himself unfavourably about the Quakers he was attacked by George Fox in his Great Mystery, 1659, p. 361.
