= Eastern Green =

Suburb of Coventry, England

Coordinates: 52.414974°N 1.585875°W

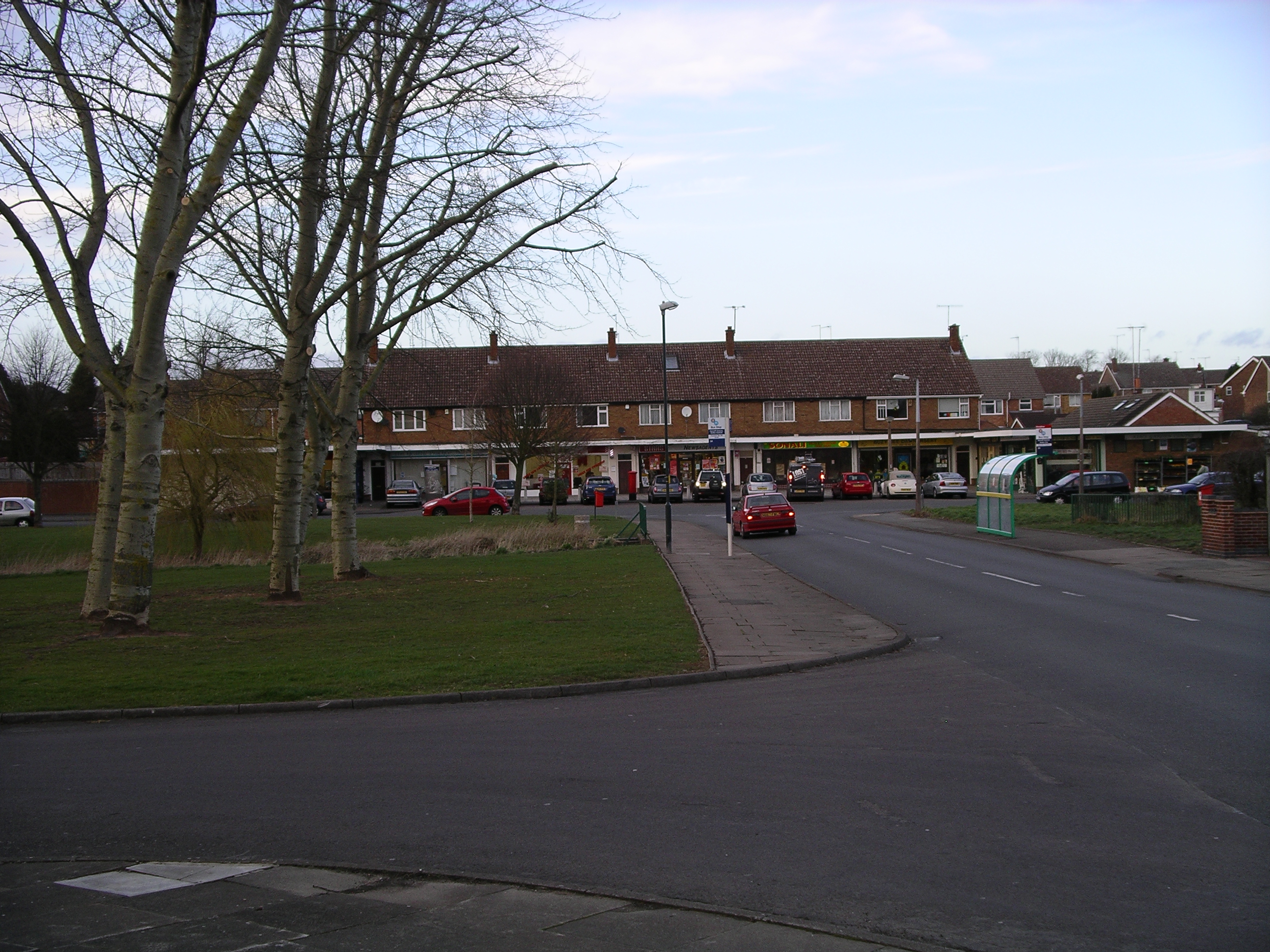
- Shops on Sutton Avenue and the green opposite

- Location within the West Midlands
- Metropolitan county: West Midlands
- Region: West Midlands
- Country: England
- Sovereign state: United Kingdom

Eastern Green is a mainly residential suburb in the far west of Coventry, England, and was formerly a village in Warwickshire. Its most western area is Upper Eastern Green and the eastern area is Lower Eastern Green, though residents generally do not distinguish between the two.

The sub-district of Mount Nod is located between Lower Eastern Green and the A45 Coventry to Birmingham dual-carriageway (the area east of Alderminster Road). The suburb of Tile Hill North is to the south and the districts of Allesley, Allesley Green and Whoberley lie to the north and east. To the west is the boundary of the Metropolitan Borough of Solihull, including the village of Berkswell and the hamlet of Pickford Green. There is also, technically, the sub-district of Hockley along Hockley Lane, however, residents do not differentiate between Hockley and Eastern Green.

A stream (‘Alles Brook’) runs from west to east through the middle of the district, and is known locally as 'The Brook.' For parts of its course, the brook is set in a narrow band of green land set with shrubbery and trees. It is a tributary of the River Sherbourne.

National Express Coventry route 14 serves the area, with services running to Whoberley, Spon End and Coventry city centre.

== Church of St Andrew ==
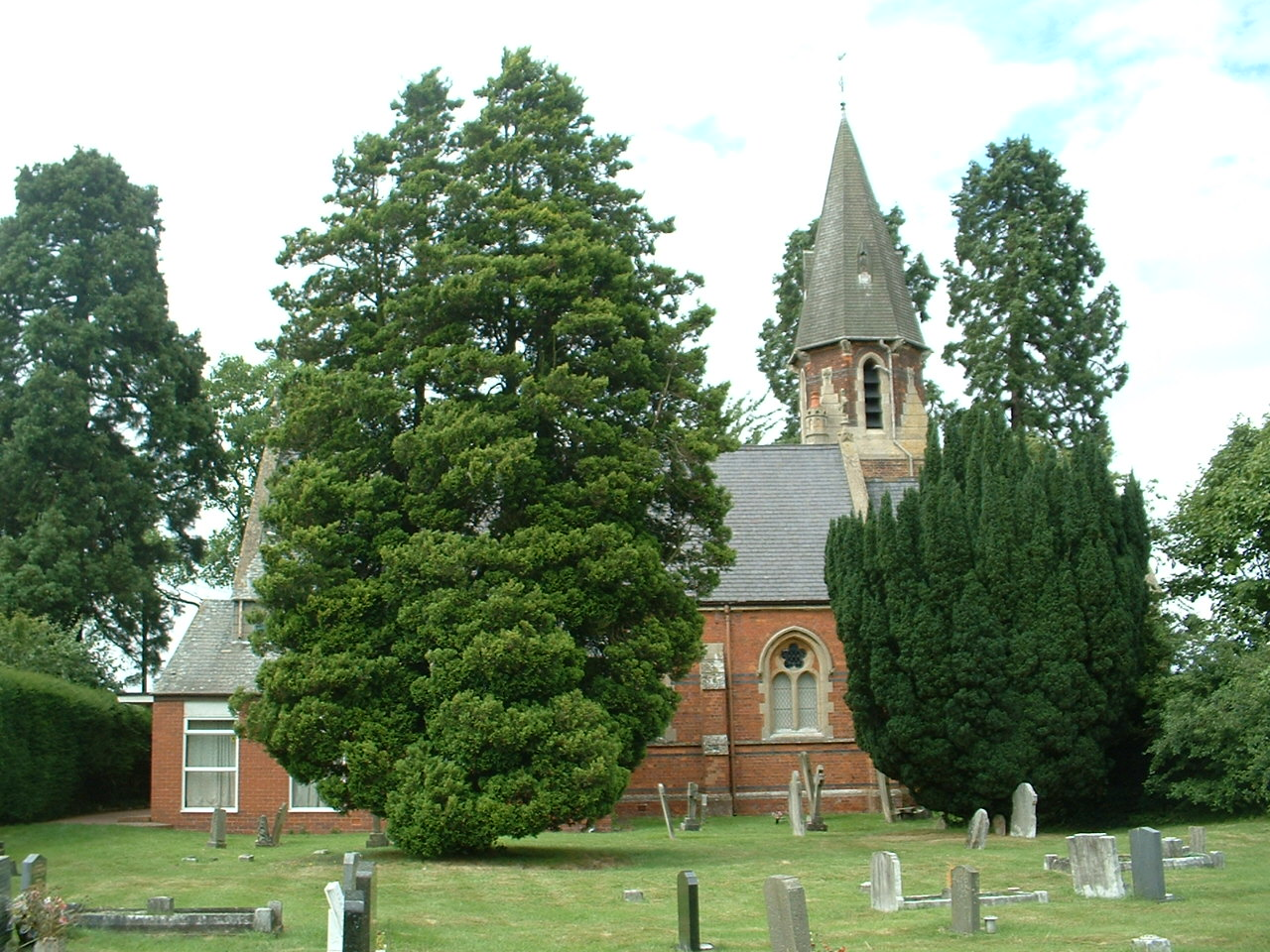
The Victorian Church of St. Andrew

The Church of St Andrew, Upper Eastern Green, established in 1875, is on the western border of Coventry. It overlooks farmland and Solihull to the west. The church is part of the Protestant Church of England. An infant school also named St Andrew's Church of England Infants’ School is situated adjacent to the eastern side of the church grounds. To the west of the church is ‘Home Farm’.
