= Henry Smith (preacher) =

English clergyman (c. 1560 – c. 1591)

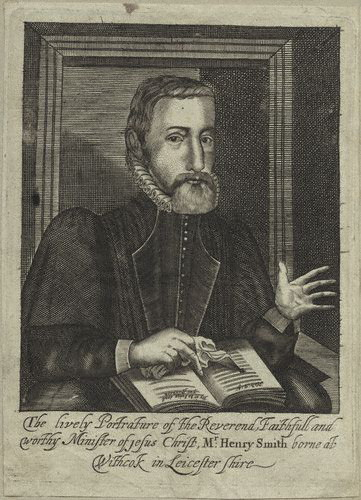
Henry Smith

Henry Smith (c. 1560 – 1591) was an English clergyman, widely regarded as "the most popular Puritan preacher of Elizabethan London." His sermons at St. Clement Danes drew enormous crowds, and earned him a reputation as "Silver Tongued" Smith. The collected editions of his sermons, and especially his tract, "God's Arrow Against Atheists," were among the most frequently reprinted religious writings of the Elizabethan age.

== Life ==
Despite his popularity in the Elizabethan period, considerable uncertainty surrounds Smith's biography.

He was born in Leicestershire to a wealthy family and was educated at Queen's College, Cambridge, and later at Lincoln College, Oxford.

Smith preached at St. Clement Danes at Westminster from 1587 to 1589.

By 1589 he was among London's most popular preachers; however in that year, Smith seems to have contracted an illness which according to Charles Henry Cooper's Athenae Cantabrigienses caused him to devote his remaining time to preparing his writings for publication:

During his sickness, being desirous to do good by writing, he occupied himself in revising his sermons and other works for the press. His collected sermons he dedicated to his kind patron Lord Burghley. . . He died before the collection came from the press, being buried at Husbands Bosworth in his native country. In the register of that parish is this entry: Anno 1591, Henricus Smyth, theologus, m filius Erasmi Smyth, armigeri, sepult. fuit 4to. die Julii.

Smith's preparations allowed his writings to become among England's most popular, after his death.

== Publications ==
His works include;

- Aeternum evangelium
- Ionah the messenger of Nineveh's repentance
- The examination of vsury in two sermons (London : R. Field for T. Man, 1591)
- The fall of King Nabuchadnezzer (Daniel Chapter 4) (1591)
- A preparative to marriage (1591)
- A Biblical Guide to Hearing and Studying the Word (with William Ames et al)
- A Treatise on the Lord’s Supper

== See also ==
- Erasmus Smith
