= Edward Taylor =

American poet (c.1642 – 1729)

- Born: circa 1642; England
- Died: June 29, 1729 (aged 86–87); Westfield, Massachusetts
- Occupation: Poet
- Writing career
- Language: English
- Genre: Poetry

Edward Taylor (c.1642 – June 29, 1729) was a colonial American poet, pastor and physician of English origin. His work remained unpublished for some 200 years but since then has established him as one of the foremost writers of his time. His poetry has been characterized as "American Baroque" as well as Metaphysical.

== Life ==
The son of a nonconformist yeoman farmer, Taylor is thought to have been born in 1642 at Sketchley, (Note: A hamlet in Aston Flamville parish.) Leicestershire. There is conflicting evidence in regard to the dates and locations of events in his early life, but he grew up during the Commonwealth of England and under the influence of his father became a convinced Protestant Dissenter. His childhood was spent on the family farm where he enjoyed the stability of a middle-class upbringing. His later writings are full of influences from his farmhouse childhood, both as regards imagery, and in the occasional use of the Leicestershire dialect.

Taylor's mother and father died in 1657 and 1658, respectively. He continued to develop alone and the extent of his formal education is unknown. For some time he worked as schoolmaster at Bagworth but following the restoration of the monarchy, Taylor refused to sign the Act of Uniformity requiring worship according the 1662 Book of Common Prayer, which cost him his teaching position. It was at this point that he began to write poetry in which he lamented the loss of religious freedoms; his lament continued throughout his poetry after he emigrated to the Massachusetts Bay Colony in America in 1668.

Taylor's Atlantic crossing and subsequent years (from April 26, 1668, to July 5, 1671) are chronicled in his now-published Diary. Just two weeks after landing in Boston, he was admitted to Harvard College as a second year student to prepare himself for ordination, studying a variety of topics and languages. Upon graduation in 1671 his first choice was to stay at university and become a resident scholar. But just a week later he accepted the call to serve as pastor and physician at Westfield, on the remote western frontier of Massachusetts, where he remained until his death 58 years later.

As a physician, Taylor was a follower of Paracelsus, as evidenced by the books known to be in his library. He left a hand-written record of remedies in his "dispensatory". These included botanicals after the fashion of Nicholas Culpeper and many agents of animal tissue origin, including some derived from mummia, or "The Deade body or flesh." The practice of medical cannibalism has been compared to Puritan attitudes toward the eucharist.

He was twice married: first to Elizabeth Fitch, by whom he had eight children, five of whom died in childhood; and at her death to Ruth Wyllys, who bore him six more children. Taylor died in Westfield on June 29, 1729.

== Poetry ==
Taylor's poems, in leather bindings of his own manufacture, survived him, but he had left explicit instructions that his heirs should never publish any of his writings and the poems remained all but forgotten for more than 200 years. The manuscripts were deposited with Yale University in 1883 by Henry Wyllys Taylor, a retired judge in Canandaigua, New York, whose father was the first cousin of Ezra Stiles, seventh president of Yale College and son of Edward Taylor's daughter Keziah and her husband, Isaac Stiles.

In 1937 Thomas H. Johnson discovered a 7,000-page quarto manuscript of Taylor's poetry in the library of Yale University and published a selection from it in The New England Quarterly. Though Johnson is said to have discovered the texts, the volumes had been catalogued by the library, and indeed Johnson had been led to the manuscripts by a reference in John Langdon Sibley's Biographical Sketches of Graduates of Harvard University (1881), which was in turn indebted to William B. Sprague's nine-volume Annals of the American Pulpit (1857–69).

The appearance of these poems, wrote Taylor's biographer Norman S. Grabo, "established [Taylor] almost at once and without quibble as not only America's finest colonial poet, but as one of the most striking writers in the whole range of American literature." His most important poems, the first sections of Preparatory Meditations (1682–1725) and God's Determinations Touching His Elect and the Elects Combat in Their Conversion and Coming up to God in Christ: Together with the Comfortable Effects Thereof (c. 1680), were published shortly after their discovery. His complete poems, however, were not published until 1960, by Donald E. Stanford.

Taylor's poems were an expression of his deeply held religious views, acquired during a strict upbringing and shaped in adulthood by New England Congregationalist Puritans, who during the 1630s and 1640s developed rules far more demanding than those of their co-religionists in England. Alarmed by a perceived lapse in piety of those in his congregation, he concluded that professing belief and leading a scandal-free life were insufficient for full participation in the local assembly. To become communing participants, "halfway members" were required to relate by testimony some personal experience of God's saving grace leading to conversion, thus affirming that they were, in their own opinion and that of the church, assured of salvation. This requirement, expressed in the famous Halfway Covenant of 1662, was readily embraced by Taylor, who became one of its most vocal advocates.

Taylor's poems are marked by a robust spiritual content, conveyed by means of homely and vivid imagery derived from everyday Puritan surroundings and glorifying the Christian experience. Written in conjunction with his sermons, his "Meditations" each explore scriptural themes and passages, often showing Taylor's own deep understanding of doctrine, as well as his struggle with some of the contradictions within strict Puritanism. His poetry is full of his expression of love of God and of his commitment to serve his creator amid the isolation of rural life. "Taylor transcended his frontier circumstances," biographer Grabo observed, "not by leaving them behind, but by transforming them into intellectual, aesthetic, and spiritual universals."

=== Interpretation ===
When a first selection of his work was published, he was called simply "A Puritan sacred poet". Soon after, however, he was being described as "an American metaphysical" and his poetry typified as "Colonial Baroque". In his work appear such typically Baroque elements as acrostic verse, word play and use of conceits, as well as spoken meditations reminiscent of George Herbert. A later study compared his approach to that of such Baroque Poets as Giambattista Marino and Francisco de Quevedo, who in his time were influencing the Spanish-language poets of the New World.

== Musical settings ==
Gerald Finzi made two settings from Taylor's Meditations. The first (op. 27.1) was the final stanza of Meditation 12, "Glorious in his apparel", which was composed as a marriage anthem for his sister-in-law in September 1946. The second (op. 27.2) was a setting of two internal stanzas from Meditation 20, "God is gone up with a triumphant shout", commissioned for the 1951 St. Cecilia Festival Service at St Sepulchre's Church, Holborn.

Two settings have been made of Taylor's poem "Huswifery". That by Richard K. Winslow (b.1918) for chorus and piano was the winner of the American Music Competition of the Sigma Alpha Iota music fraternity in 1950. It was later set for a cappella chorus by Gordon Binkerd in 1970. Binkerd had earlier set "The Ebb and Flow" for a cappella chorus in 1966. In addition, the meditation "What Love Is This" was set as an anthem for four-part chorus and organ by Timothy Hoekman in 1978, and in the choral motet (1985) by Kenneth Leighton.
