= William Mew =

English clergyman

William Mew (Mewe) (1602 – c.1669) was an English clergyman, a member of the Westminster Assembly. He is known also for a drama, Pseudomagia, and for the contribution to beekeeping of the design for a transparent hive.

== Life ==
Mew was a graduate of Emmanuel College, Cambridge, where he was admitted in 1618 and was B.A. in 1622. Mew held also a B.D. degree. Pseudomagia, a Neo-Latin drama, is thought to have been performed at Emmanuel around 1626.

On 29 November 1643 he preached a fast-day sermon to Parliament, later printed as The Robbing and Spoiling of Jacob and Israel. He is mentioned for constant attendance in the Westminster Assembly. He was approached to answer Milton's divorce tracts, as he wrote in 1659 to Richard Baxter. In this frank correspondence Baxter expressed his deepest fears and suspicions, becoming at one point (6 August 1659) "hysterical".

He became vicar of Eastington, Stroud in Gloucestershire, for which the patron was Nathaniel Stephens, a local MP and one of Oliver Cromwell's colonels. Previously he had been a lecturer in London. Known as a preacher, he conformed in 1662. He was a commissioner for Gloucestershire in 1654.

Mew's hive was made known by Samuel Hartlib. Mew's design followed a suggestion in Pliny and proved influential, being adapted by John Wilkins and Christopher Wren.
