= Andrew Perne (Puritan) =

English clergyman

Andrew Perne (1596–1654) was an English clergyman of Puritan opinions. He was also member of the Westminster Assembly.

== Life ==
Perne entered Peterhouse, Cambridge as a sizar in 1613, graduating B.A. in 1618 and M.A. in 1621.

He was fellow of Catherine Hall, Cambridge, from 1622 to 1627, when he was made rector of Wilby, Northamptonshire. He was chosen in 1643 one of the four representatives from Northamptonshire to the Westminster Assembly. At this time he may have been sequestered from his living, and at St Dunstan-in-the-West.

He preached two sermons before the House of Commons during the Long Parliament. The first was on the occasion of a public fast, 31 May 1643, and was printed. The second was held on 23 April 1644, at the thanksgiving for Thomas Fairfax's victory at Selby.

He died at Wilby on 13 December 1654, and was buried in the chancel of his church. The church has an inscription to his memory. A funeral sermon by Samuel Ainsworth of Kelmarsh was published.
