= Arthur Hildersham =

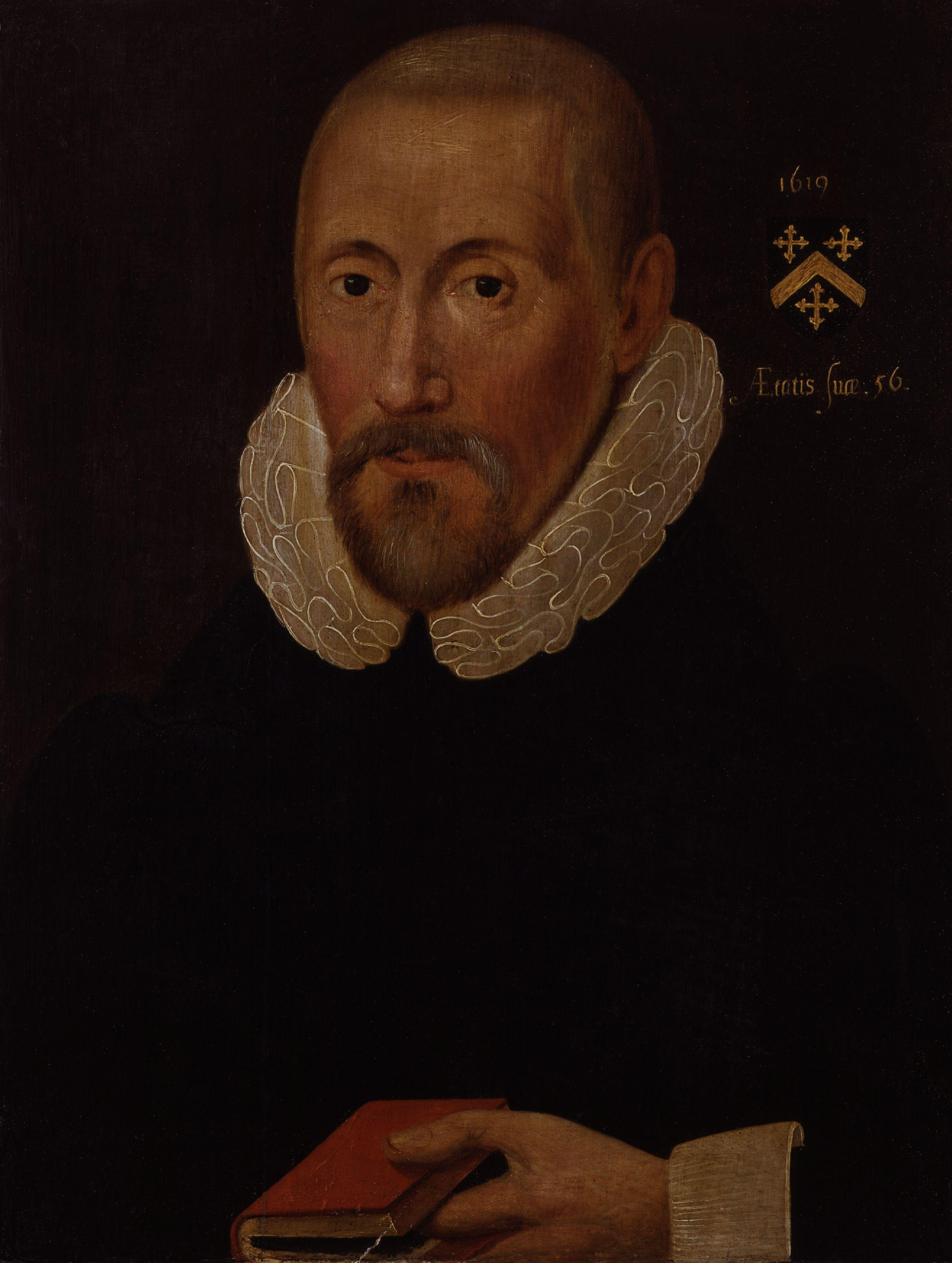
Unattributed 1619 portrait of Arthur Hildersham

Arthur Hildersham (1563–1632) was an English clergyman, a Puritan and nonconforming preacher.

== Life ==
Arthur Hildersham was born at Stetchworth, and brought up as a Roman Catholic. He was educated in Saffron Walden and at Christ's College, Cambridge. Through the patronage of Henry Hastings, 3rd Earl of Huntingdon, he became vicar of St Helen's Church, Ashby-de-la-Zouch. According to Benjamin Brook, the Leicestershire connection was through the good offices of John Ireton, who became vicar of Kegworth, and who offered help to Hildersham when his family objected to his conversion to Protestantism. He was literary executor, with John Dod, to Thomas Cartwright, who died in 1603.

He was one of the promoters of the Millenary Petition, with Stephen Egerton. It was presented to James I in 1603; but he was excluded from the subsequent Hampton Court Conference, where four moderate voices represented the Puritan trend. He was deprived of his living in 1605, and then relied on lecturing positions. William Lilly (born 1602) was educated in Ashby-de-la-Zouch, and described the "silenced" Hildersham in his History of His Life and Times. Lilly's teacher was John Brinsley the elder, one of Hildersham's circle.

One place he was a lecturer was at Burton-on-Trent. With Peter Eccleshall he had been conducting a 'common exercise' in Burton by 1596. Related to this religious activity was Isabel Foljambe and the case of Thomas Darling, who became celebrated as a result of efforts at exorcism. Hildersham supported the exorcist John Darrell. Also he had connections with the heresy case of Edward Wightman, burned in 1612.

Around 1615, he encountered Francis Higginson, who in 1629 settled in Salem, Massachusetts. Under Hildersham's influence he became a nonconformist, setting off the train of events leading to Higginson's emigration.

== Family ==
He had royal blood, being a great-grandson of Margaret Pole, 8th Countess of Salisbury, the last of the Plantagenet dynasty. This accounts for the story that Elizabeth I called him "cousin Hildersham". His parents were Ann Pole (daughter of Geoffrey Pole), and Thomas Hildersham and was reported to have been "cast off" by his parents because of his Puritan beliefs.

He was married to Anne Barfoot, daughter of John Barfoot of Lamborne, on 5 January 1590. They had four children: including Samuel, Timothy, Sarah, and an unnamed son. Anne died in 1639. Their son Samuel Hildersham (1594?–1674), a Westminster Divine and minister who was ejected in 1662, married Mary Goodyear, and died in 1674.

== Works ==
- Lectures upon the Fourth of John (1629)
- Verklaring van psalm 51.

== External Resources ==
- Arthur Hildersham manuscripts (Eng Ms 524) at the John Rylands Library, Manchester.
