= Isabel Darcy =

English patron of clergy

- Born: Isabel Wray c. 1563; Glentworth, Lincolnshire, Kingdom of England
- Died: 27 January 1621; Aldwark, Yorkshire, Kingdom of England
- Known for: Patron of Protestant clergy

Isabel, Lady Darcy, also known as Isabel, Lady Bowes and Isabel Foljambe (c. 1563 – 27 January 1621), was an English patron of clergy. She was a supporter of exorcism, Puritanism, and the exorcist John Darrell.

== Life ==
Born Isabel Wray in Glentworth, Lincolnshire, she was the daughter of Sir Christopher Wray (1524–1592), an English judge and former Speaker of the House of Commons, and Anne Girlington (died 1593).

Although her father was known for opposing Puritanism, Wray and several of her siblings became associated with the Puritan movement. Her brother, Sir William Wray, was described as a leading patron of Puritanism in Lincolnshire. Wray and her sister Frances also supported the education of Puritan minister Richard Bernard, who studied at Christ's College, Cambridge.

In 1582, she married Godfrey Foljambe of Aldwarke and Walton, Derbyshire. During the captivity of Mary, Queen of Scots, Mary stayed at the Foljambe residence at Walton for two nights in January 1569.

Wray became involved in efforts to exorcise Katherine Wright, who was believed to be possessed by a demonic spirit. Several ministers participated in the case, although John Darrell later became most closely associated with the exorcism. Wray was also associated with a Puritan group in Ashby-de-la-Zouch led by Arthur Hildersham, of which Richard Bernard was also a member.

Following the death of her first husband on 14 June 1595, Wray married Sir William Bowes around 1600. Bowes later served as English ambassador to Scotland, succeeding his uncle Robert Bowes. In 1603, William Bowes wrote to the Earl of Shrewsbury regarding religious reform within the Church of England, noting that he had consulted his wife because of her knowledge of such matters. Shrewsbury reportedly criticised him for seeking advice from his wife.

== Puritan conference in Coventry ==
In 1606, Wray and William Bowes authorized Puritan leaders to organize a conference in their mansion at Coventry. One of the leaders was Thomas Helwys, Puritan theologian and lawyer, founder of the Baptist tradition, who later was exiled in the Dutch Republic (The Netherlands). During this time, Wray was financially supporting the Puritan minister Richard Rothwell. William Bowes died in 1611, right before Helwys returning to England.

== Later life ==
On 7 May 1617, Wray married John, Lord Darcy of Aston, known as "4th Lord Darcy of the North", who was her third and last husband.

Darcy died at her residence in Aldwark, Yorkshire, on 27 January 1621.
