= William Whately =

English Puritan cleric and author

William Whately (1583–1639) was an English Puritan cleric and author.

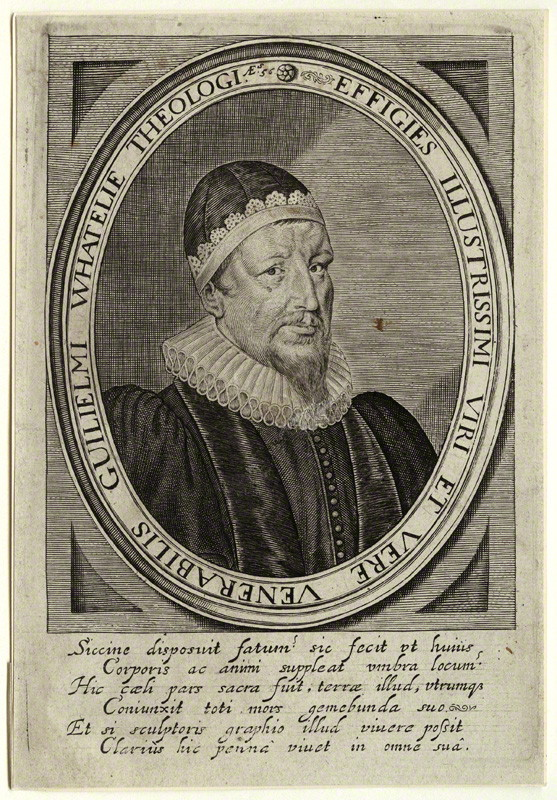
William Whately

== Life ==
The son of Thomas Whately, twice mayor of Banbury, Oxfordshire, and Joyce his wife, he was born at Banbury on 21 May 1583. At fourteen he entered Christ's College, Cambridge, where he had Thomas Potman for his tutor. He graduated B.A. in 1601, known as a logician and orator.

Whately left Cambridge with Puritan opinions to continue theological study at home. As his father-in-law suggested, Whately went to Oxford to study for the ministry, and was incorporated at St. Edmund Hall on 15 July 1602. He graduated M.A. on 26 June 1604.

Shortly Whately was chosen lecturer in Banbury; and was instituted on 9 February 1610, on the king's presentation, to the vicarage of Banbury. His preaching attracted some from Oxford to hear him. With other ministers he delivered lectures at Stratford-upon-Avon.

Whately died at Banbury on 10 May 1639. He was buried in the churchyard under a raised monument, now destroyed, with an inscription preserved by a copy made on 13 July 1660. He was popular in Banbury, a fact referred to ironically by Richard Corbet, in his Iter Boreale, written about 1625, in referring to the neglected condition of his church.

== Works ==
Whately caused himself trouble by the publication of A Bride-Bvsh; or a Direction for Married Persons. Plainely describing the Dvties common to both, and peculiar to each of them (London, 1619; republished 1623; Bristol, 1768; translated into Welsh, Llanrwst, 1834). In it he propounded that "the sin of adultery or wilfull desertion dissolveth the bond and annihilateth the covenant of matrimonie"; and raised a storm of opposition in the church. He was convened before the Court of High Commission, but, retracting his propositions on 4 May 1621, was dismissed. To the second edition (1623) he appended an address to the reader explain he had erred; and again in A Care Cloth he denied his earlier opinion.

Whately was also author of:

- The Redemption of Time, London, 1606.
- A Caveat for the Covetous, London, 1609.
- The New Birth, London, 1618; 2nd edit. 1622.
- God's Husbandry, London, 1622; republished London, 1846.
- A Pithie, Short, and Methodicall opening of the Ten Commandements, London, 1622.
- Mortification, London, 1623.
- Charitable Teares, London, 1623.
- A Care-Cloth; or a Treatise of the Cvmbers and Troubles of Marriage, London, 1624.
- Sinne no more, London, 1628, a sermon preached on the occasion of a fire which on Sunday, 2 March 1628, destroyed almost the whole of Banbury town.
- The Poore Man's Advocate, London, 1637.
- The Oyle of Gladness, or Comfort for Dejected Sinners, London, 1637.
- Prototypes (posthumous), London, 1640; 2nd edit. 1647.

A posthumous volume of sermons was issued by his executors, Henry Scudder and Edward Leigh. Whately's library, catalogued by Edward Millington (London, 1683), was sold at Bridge's coffee-house in Pope's Head Alley on 23 April 1683.

== Family ==
Whately married Martha, daughter of George Hunt, fellow of Magdalen College, Oxford, and for 51 years rector of Collingbourne Ducis, Wiltshire. George Hunt was the son of John Hunt, an evangelical Protestant condemned to be burnt by Queen Mary, but reprieved by her death. By his wife, buried at Banbury on 10 December 1641, Whately had two sons:

- William (d. 24 January 1647), who was perhaps the William Whately who became mayor of Banbury; and
- Thomas, vicar of Sutton-under-Brailes, Warwickshire, an ejected minister of 1662; he later preached at Milton, Woodstock, and Long Combe, Oxfordshire, and was buried at Banbury on 27 January 1698.
