= Puritan exorcism =

Puritan exorcism was the use of exorcism by Puritan ministers. The demonology of Puritans was not unusual within the Early Modern demonology of Protestants, but the use of ritual and prayer in exorcism was more distinctive. The Church of England did not recognise the ritual of exorcism. Some Puritan ministers performed exorcisms; but some leading Puritan writers, such as William Perkins, opposed the ritual, while accepting the underlying theories, for example about witchcraft.

The term Protestant dispossession is also used, which allows for the differences from Catholic practice. There are a number of well-documented cases. John Darrell had a career as an exorcist spanning about 15 years; others were Robert Balsom, John Foxe, Edward Nyndge, and Richard Rothwell.

== Cessationist view and its alternative ==
Orthodox for the Church of England, and more broadly for followers of the Protestant Reformation, was that the cessation of miracles after the apostolic times ruled out the resort to exorcism or casting out of devils. The Book of Common Prayer from 1552 made no mention of it. On the other hand, a general Calvinist pattern might be applied, of thoughtful investigation of an "affliction" attributed to God, prayer and fasting, and a minister ultimately commanding a spirit to leave the afflicted person's body. This procedure was accepted by some who would reject completely Catholic priestly exorcism.

== Use of fasting ==
Fasting became important in Puritanism exorcism, but was not present in earlier Elizabethan procedures. John Foxe exorcised Robert Briggs without fasting, and John Darrell initially did not use it. The exorcism in Norwich by its bishop John Parkhurst, in 1574, may have introduced a fast day in this context. It became a sine qua non of the Puritan approach to exorcism.

When Richard Bancroft as Bishop of London undertook to limit Puritanism, he had the cessationist view advanced against Darrell. In 1602 Puritan ministers who attempted an exorcism of Mary Glover were imprisoned. The new Canons of the Church of England of 1604 specified (Canon LXXII) that days of prayer and fasting for casting out of devils could be held only with the bishop's permission.

The Canon did not put an end to Puritan belief in the efficacy of exorcism. On the other hand, it stamped out the public use of exorcism by clergy of the church, until the period of the English Civil War. Nonconformists continued to use exorcism.
