= Edward Leigh (writer) =

English lay writer and politician

Colonel Sir Edward Leigh
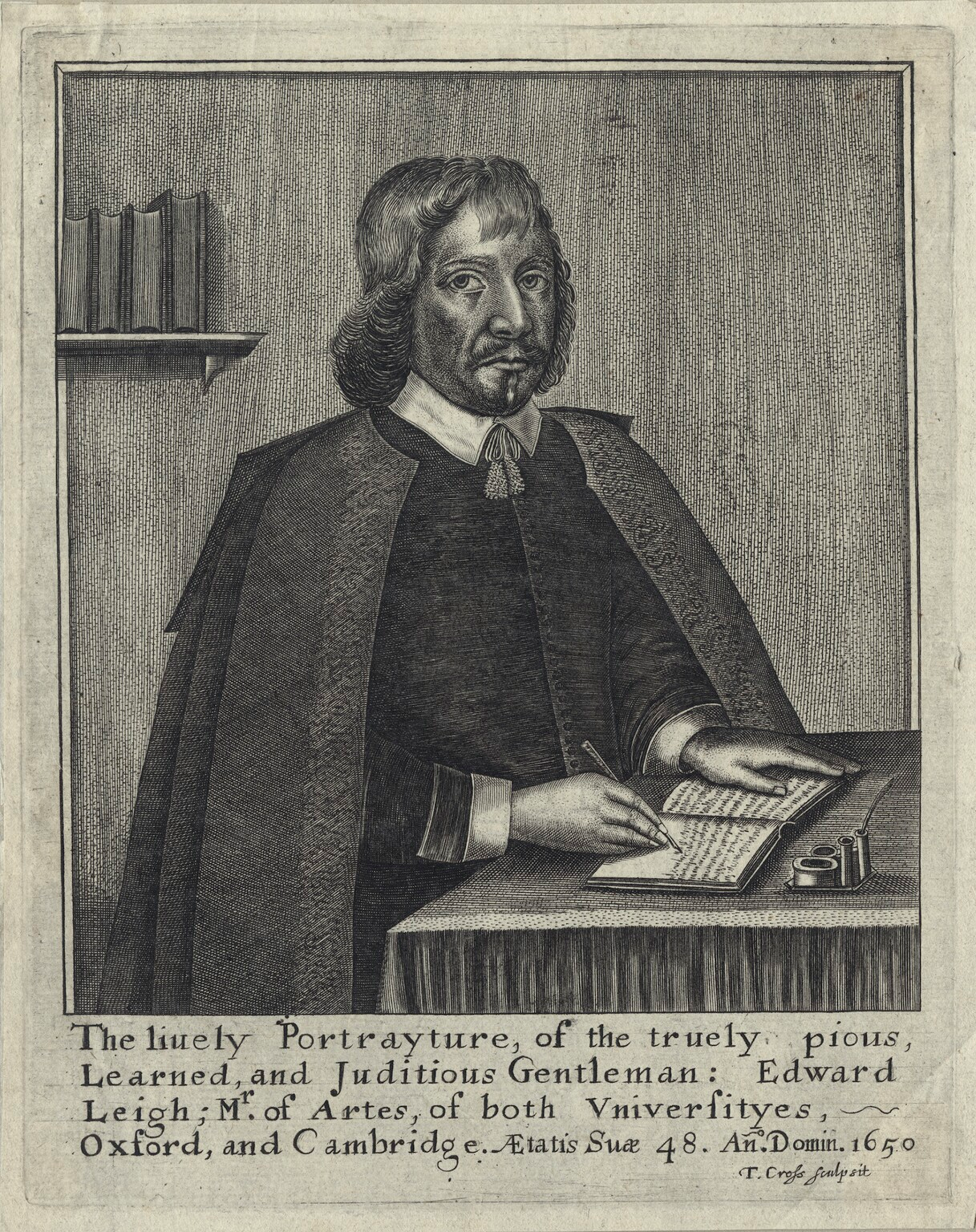

Member of Parliament for Stafford
- In office 1645–1648
- Preceded by: Richard Weston
- Succeeded by: Seat vacant

Personal details
- Born: 24 March 1602 Shawell Hall, Leicestershire
- Died: 2 June 1671 (aged 69) Rushall Hall, Staffordshire
- Resting place: St Michael's Church, Rushall, Staffordshire
- Spouse: Elizabeth Talbot
- Relations: Sir Henry Leigh (father)
- Children: Henry Leigh; Richard Leigh
- Education: Magdalen Hall, Oxford
- Occupation: Parliamentarian
- Profession: Author
- Awards: Knight bachelor

Military service
- Allegiance: Parliamentary Army
- Rank: Colonel

Sir Edward Leigh (24 March 1602 – 2 June 1671) was an English lay writer, known particularly for his works on religious topics, and a politician who sat in the House of Commons from 1645 to 1648.

Leigh served as a colonel in the Parliamentary Army during the English Civil War.

== Life ==
Born at Shawell, Leicestershire, he was the son and heir of Sir Henry Leigh, Sheriff of Staffordshire, who died in 1630.

Having matriculated at Magdalen Hall, Oxford, on 24 October 1617, he graduated as B.A. in 1620, before proceeding M.A. in 1623. After Oxford, Leigh entered the Middle Temple and became a painstaking student of divinity, law, and history. During the plague of 1625 he spent six months in France, and busied himself in making a collection of French proverbs. He subsequently moved to Banbury, Oxfordshire, to be near William Whately, whose preaching he admired.

Knighted in 1632 being of Staffordshire landed gentry, he was later noted for his anti-Catholicism. At the outbreak of civil war, Leigh upon being appointed colonel in the Parliamentary Army preferred not to be styled Sir. On 30 September 1644 he presented to parliament a petition from Staffordshire Parliamentarians complaining of Cavalier oppression, and made a speech which was printed. In 1645 he was elected Member of Parliament for Stafford in the Long Parliament to replace those MPs who had been declared 'disabled to sit'. His theological attainments procured him a seat at the Westminster Assembly. His signature is affixed to the letter written in the name of the Parliamentary Committee which granted powers to the Visitors of the University of Oxford in 1647. Having in December 1648 voted that the King's concessions were satisfactory, Sir Edward was expelled from the House under Pride's Purge. From then he appears to have avoided public life.

Leigh died at Rushall Hall, Staffordshire, at the age of 69, where he was lord of the manor, being buried in the church of which he was patron.

== Works ==
Leigh's writings are mostly compilations, his major works being:

- Critica Sacra, or Philologicall and Theologicall Observations upon all the Greek Words of the New Testament in order alphabeticall, &c., London, 1639; 2nd edit, 1646.
- Critica Sacra. Observations on all the Radices or Primitive Hebrew Words of the Old Testament in order alphabeticall, wherein both they (and many derivatives . . .) are fully opened, London, 1642, with a commendatory epistle by William Gouge.

Both parts were published together as a third edition in 1650, (4th edit., 1662). These compilations were used by later lexicographers of the Old and New Testaments, and won Leigh the friendship of James Ussher. A Latin translation by Henricus à Middoch, accompanied with observations on all the Chaldee words of the Old Testament by J. Hesser, was issued at Amsterdam, 3rd edit., 1696; 5th edit, with appendix by J. C. Kesler, Gotha, 1706. There are also supplements by P. Stokkemark (1713) and M. C. Wolfburg (1717). The work was reconstructed by M. Tempestini for J. P. Migne's Encyclopédie Théologique (vol. vii. pt. ii.), 1846, &c.

Leigh also wrote:

- A Treatise of the Divine Promises. In Five Bookes, London, 1633 (4th edit., 1657), the model of Samuel Clarke's Scripture Promises.
- Selected and Choice Observations concerning the Twelve First Caesars, Emperours of Rome, Oxford, 1635. The second edition, published as Analecta de xii. primis Caesaribus, London, 1647, has an appendix of Certaine choice French Proverbs. An enlarged edition, "containing all the Romane Emperours. The first eighteen by E. Leigh. The others added by his son, Henry Leigh", appeared in 1657, 1663, and 1670.
- A Treatise of Divinity, consisting of Three Bookes, 3 pts., London, 1647.
- The Saint's Encouragement in Evil Times, or Observations concerning the Martyrs in general, with some Memorable Collections about them out of Mr. Foxes three volumes, London, 1648; 2nd edit. 1651.
- Annotations upon all the New Testament, Philologicall and Theologicall, London, 1650; translated into Latin by Arnold, and published at Leipzig in 1732.
- A Philologicall Commentary, or an Illustration of the most obvious and useful Words in the Law ... By E. L., London, 1652; 2nd edit. 1658.
- A Systeme or Body of Divinity . . . wherein the fundamentals of Religion are opened, the contrary Errours refuted, London, 1654; 2nd edit. 1662.
- A Treatise of Religion and Learning, and of Religious and Learned Men, London, 1656, which fell flat and was reissued as Felix Consortium, or a fit Conjuncture of Religion and Learning, in 1663. To this treatise William Crowe was indebted in his Elenchus Scriptorum, 1672.
- Annotations on five poetical Books of the Old Testament, London, 1657.
- Second Considerations of the High Court of Chancery, London, 1658.
- England Described, or the several Counties and Shires thereof briefly handled, London, 1659, taken mostly from William Camden's Britannia.
- Choice Observations of all the Kings of England from the Saxons to the Death of King Charles the First. Collected out of the best . . . Writers, London, 1661.
- Three Diatribes or Discourses. First, of Travel, or a Guide for Travellers into Foreign Parts. Secondly, of Money . . . Thirdly, of Measuring of the Distance betwixt Place and Place, London, 1671 (another edition, entitled The Gentleman's Guide, in Three Discourses, 1680), reprinted in vol. x. of the Harleian Miscellany, ed. Park.

With Henry Scudder, Leigh edited William Whately's Prototypes . . . with Mr. Whatelye's Life and Death, 1640. He also published Christopher Cartwright's The Magistrate's Authority in matters of Religion, 1647, to which he prefixed a preface in defence of his conduct for sitting in the Westminster Assembly of Divines and other clerical meetings. He assisted William Hinde in bringing out John Rainolds's The Prophesie of Haggai interpreted and applyed, 1649; and edited by himself Lancelot Andrewes's Discourse of Ceremonies, 1653.

== See also ==
- Lindblad, Stefan T. "Of the Nature of God: The Inter-Relation of Essence and Trinity in Edward Leigh's A Systeme or Body of Divinity (1662)", Journal of the Institute of Reformed Baptist Studies 1 (2014): 95–124.
- Dolezal, James E. "A Practical Scholasticism? Edward Leigh's Theological Method", Westminster Theological Journal 71 (2) (2009): 337–354.
- This article incorporates text from a publication now in the public domain: Goodwin, Gordon (1892). "Leigh, Edward". In Lee, Sidney (ed.). Dictionary of National Biography. Vol. 32. London: Smith, Elder & Co. p. 432.

Parliament of England
Preceded by Ralph Sneyd; Richard Weston	Member of Parliament for Stafford; 1645–1648; With: John Swinfen	Succeeded by Not represented in the Rump Parliament
