= William Bowes (ambassador) =

English ambassador to Scotland

Sir William Bowes of Streatlam, (died 1611), was an English ambassador to Scotland, Deputy Warden of the West March, Treasurer of Berwick-upon-Tweed, and Member of Parliament for Westmorland.

William was the eldest son of George Bowes of Streatlam and Dorothy Mallory and succeeded to his father's encumbered estates in 1580. He was elected Member of Parliament for Westmorland in 1593

== In Scotland ==
Bowes represented Elizabeth I at the court of James VI of Scotland. His uncle, Robert Bowes, had earlier held the position.

In May 1597 William Bowes came to Edinburgh, and Sir George Home of Wedderburn and Sir John Carmichael brought him to meet James VI in the garden of Holyrood Palace. Robert Bowes introduced his nephew, and William Bowes gave his speech to the king at the end of garden alley. They were brought into the garden for a second audience by Sir William Stewart of Traquair and George Young, and after a discussion, Robert and William Bowes were escorted to the Council Chamber in the palace by Carmichael and Wedderburn. Sitting at the table were the Duke of Lennox, the Earl of Mar, Lord Home, Lord Seton, Lord Ochiltree, the President Alexander Seton, and other members of the council and border commissioners. They discussed the request from Queen Elizabeth that Sir Robert Ker and Sir Walter Scott be sent to London for their infringements of border custom. Bowes cited the delivery by Henry VII of Sir William Heron to Scotland for the murder of Robert Ker of Cessford (1511), and the more recent rendition of Carmichael for the Raid of Redeswire (1575). Uncle and nephew discussed this conference with the king on 26 May, and the cases of other fugitives including Bothwell and Brian O'Rourke.

In June 1597 William was again sent to Scotland with Robert Bowes to discuss border affairs and incidents at Swinburn and Eslington Road involving the Scottish border warden Sir Robert Kerr of Cessford (later Lord Roxburgh), and they met James VI first at Linlithgow Palace, and on 20 June in the garden of Falkland Palace. He was appointed treasurer of Berwick-upon-Tweed from 1598 to 1603.

Bowes went to Scotland again in January 1598. While he waited for an audience he was visited by the Comptroller, George Home of Wedderburn and Harry Lindsay of Kinfauns, Master of the Queen's Household. The next day he was brought into the King's Chamber of Presence at Holyrood Palace which was fully attended.

After the death of Robert Bowes, in April 1598 William Bowes was made Treasurer of Berwick and paymaster of the garrisons of the Marches of Scotland.

In June 1599 William became concerned by the activities of a private English gentlemen, Edmund Ashfield, who had obtained permission to visit Scotland. William assisted in Ashfield's kidnap and rendition to England and faced an angry Edinburgh mob at his lodging. A French ambassador Monsieur de Béthune, brother of the Duke of Sully, came to Falkland Palace in July 1599. Bowes was reluctant to come to Falkland at the same time, anticipating that James VI might show more favour to the French ambassador. William was recalled soon after.

In August 1604 Bowes accompanied Prince Charles and his guardian Alexander Seton, Lord Fyvie on their journey from Scotland towards London. The comptroller of Berwick, John Crane wrote from Worksop Manor to the Mayor of Leicester, asking him to prepare a lodging with twelve beds and seven hogshead barrels of beer. The Mayor arranged for the royal party to stay at the townhouse of William Skipwith. They continued to Dingley, the home of Thomas Griffin, and to Easton Neston the home of George Fermor, where James VI and Anne of Denmark joined them.

== Family ==
Around the year 1600 William married Isabel Wray, daughter of the English judge Sir Christopher Wray.
