= William Crowe (bibliographer) =

English clergyman and bibliographer

William Crowe (1616–1675) was an English clergyman and bibliographer.

== Life ==
Crowe was born in Suffolk in 1616, and matriculated at the University of Cambridge as a member of Caius College on 14 December 1632. On 4 December 1668, he was nominated by Archbishop Gilbert Sheldon chaplain and schoolmaster of the hospital of Holy Trinity at Croydon, Surrey, founded by Archbishop Whitgift. This office he held till 1675, when the following entry appears in the Croydon parish register:—' 1675, Ap. 11. William Crow that was school master of the Free School, who hanged himself in the window of one of his chambers in his dwelling house, was buried in the church'.

== Works ==
Crowe's published work included:

- 'An Exact Collection or Catalogue of our English Writers on the Old and New Testament, either in whole or in part: whether Commentators, Elucidators, Adnotators, or Expositors, at large, or in single sermons,' Lond. 1663, (anon.); the second impression, 'corrected and enlarged with three or four thousand additionals,' Lond. 1668. Anthony Wood states that the presbyterian divine, John Osborne, projected a similar work, and had printed about eight sheets of it, when he was forestalled by Crowe. The work is sometimes called Osborne's, but more generally Crow's Catalogue. It was the precursor of John Cooke's 'Preacher's Assistant.'
- 'Elenchus Scriptorum in Sacram Scripturam tam Græcorum quam Latinorum, &c. In quo exhibentur eorum Gens, Patria, Professio, Religio, Librorum Tituli, Volumina, Editiones variæ. Quo tempore claruerint, vel obierint. Elogia item aliquot Virorum clarissimorum. Quibus omnibus præmissa sunt S. Biblia, partesque Bibliorum, variis linguis variis vicibus edita,' Lond. 1672. Dedicated to Archbishop Sheldon, his patron. In this work, Crowe borrowed from Edward Leigh's 'Treatise of Religion and Learning.'
