= Christopher Wray (English judge) =

English politician (1524–1592)

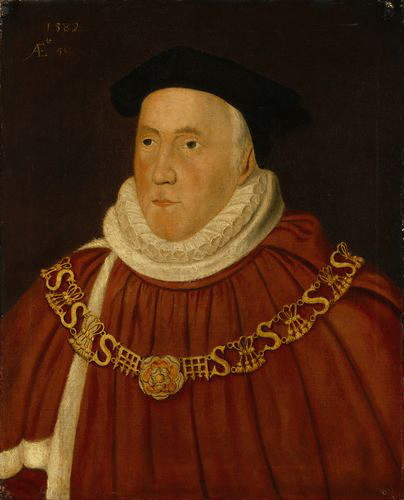
Sir Christopher Wray.

Sir Christopher Wray (1524 – 7 May 1592) was an English judge and Chief Justice of the King's Bench.

== Early life and career ==
Wray, the third son of Thomas Wray, seneschal in 1535 of Coverham Abbey, Yorkshire, by Joan, daughter of Robert Jackson of Gatenby, Bedale, in the same county, was born at Bedale in 1524. The ancient doubts, revived by Lord Campbell as to his legitimacy, were removed by the publication in 1853 of the wills of his mother (by her second marriage wife of John Wycliffe, auditor of issues in the Richmond district) and his brother-in-law, Ralph Gower. The pedigree, however, was first traced with accuracy from the Wrays of Wensleydale by the Rev. George Octavius Wray in the Genealogist.

Wray was an alumnus of Buckingham College, Cambridge (refounded during his residence as Magdalene College). Though apparently no graduate, he was a loyal son to his alma mater, and set a high value on learning. The subject created two bye-fellows. Tradition ascribes to him the adornment of the college with the rich Renaissance west porch, and a deed dated show of 16 July 1587s that he had then built or rebuilt a portion of the edifice containing three stories of four rooms apiece, which were appropriated to the use of two fellows and six scholars, whose maintenance he secured by a rentcharge. He added another fellowship by his will; two more were founded by his wife in 1591, and a fellowship and two scholarships by his second daughter in 1625.

Wray was admitted on 6 February 1544–45 as a student at Lincoln's Inn, where he was called to the bar in Hilary term 1549–50, was reader in autumn 1562, treasurer in 1565–6, and again reader in Lent 1567 in anticipation of his call to the degree of serjeant-at-law, which took place in the ensuing Easter term. On 18 June of the same year he was made queen's Serjeant. His parliamentary career began by his return (30 September 1553) for Boroughbridge, Yorkshire, which constituency he continued to represent until the death of Queen Mary of England in 1558. From 1563 to 1567 he sat for Great Grimsby, Lincolnshire. Like most of the gentlemen of the north, he was probably a Catholic at heart, but he evidently steered a wary course, for in the religious census of justices of the peace, compiled by episcopal authority in 1564, he is entered as ' indifferent.' In the following year he was assigned by the court of king's bench as counsel for Bonner in the proceedings on the Praemunire. In the spring of 1569–70 he attended the assizes held at York, Carlisle, and Durham for the trial of the northern rebels, and was employed in receiving their submissions. Among them were his brother Thomas and his sister's son John Gower, both of whom were pardoned.

== Speaker of the House of Commons ==
In the parliament of 1571 Wray, then member for Ludgershall, Wiltshire, was chosen Speaker of the House of Commons. In his address to the throne on presentation he expatiated with much learning and eloquence in praise of the royal supremacy in matters ecclesiastical, touched lightly but loyally on supply, and gratefully acknowledged the free course which her majesty allowed to the administration of justice. The speech introduced petitions for freedom from arrest, free access to and considerate audience by her majesty, and free speech. The first three were granted; the last only elicited an intimation that the commons would do well to meddle with no affairs of state but such as might be referred to them by ministers. The revival, in defiance of this injunction, of the whole question of the reformation of religion and church government occasioned an early dissolution (29 May). An act (the Oxford and Cambridge Act 1571) confirming the charters, liberties, and privileges of the University of Cambridge owed its passage largely to Wray's influence, for which the thanks of the senate were communicated to him by letter (5 June).

== Lord Chief Justice ==
Wray was appointed on 14 May 1572 justice, and on 8 November 1574 chief justice, of the queen's bench. The only state trial in which as puisne he took part was that in Trinity term 1572 of John Hall and Francis Rolston for conspiracy to effect the release of Mary, Queen of Scots. As chief justice, in addition to his ordinary jurisdiction he exercised functions of a somewhat multifarious character. He was a member of the commission appointed on 23 April 1577 to adjudicate on the validity of the election of John Underhill (1545?–1592) to the rectorship of Lincoln College, Oxford; and as assistant to the House of Lords he advised on bills, received petitions, and on one occasion (14 September 1586) was placed on the commission for its adjournment. He was a strong judge, who well knew how to sustain the dignity of his office, and showed as much firmness in restraining by prohibition an excess of jurisdiction on the part of the ecclesiastical commission in 1581 as in enforcing the laws against the sectaries in that and subsequent years. It was not until towards the close of his life that he was himself added to the ecclesiastical commission (Christmas 1589).

The principal state trials over which he presided were those of the puritan John Stubbs or Stubbe, the Jesuit Edmund Campion, and his harbourer, William, lord Vaux (son of Thomas Vaux, 2nd Baron Vaux of Harrowdon), and the conspirators against the life of the queen, John Somerville and William Parry (d. 1585) He also presided at the Star Chamber inquest, by which (23 June 1585) the suicide and treasons of the Earl of Northumberland were certified; and was a member of the commissions which attainted Northumberland's accomplice, William, grandson of Sir William Shelley, and passed sentence of death upon Anthony Babington and his associates (September 1586). He was present at Fotheringhay Castle as assessor to the tribunal before which the Queen of Scots pleaded in vain for her life (14 October 1586), but appears to have taken no part in the proceedings. He presided, vice Sir Thomas Bromley (1530–1587), absent through illness, at the subsequent trial in the Star Chamber of the unfortunate secretary of state, William Davison, whose indiscreet zeal he blandly censured as bonum sed non-bene before pronouncing the ruthless sentence of the court (28 March 1587). The last state trials in which he took part were those of Philip Howard, Earl of Arundel, on 18 April 1589, and of Sir John Perrot on 27 April 1592. At a conference with his colleagues in Michaelmas term 1590 he initiated the revision of the form of commissions of the peace, then full of corruptions and redundancies.

== Death and reputation ==
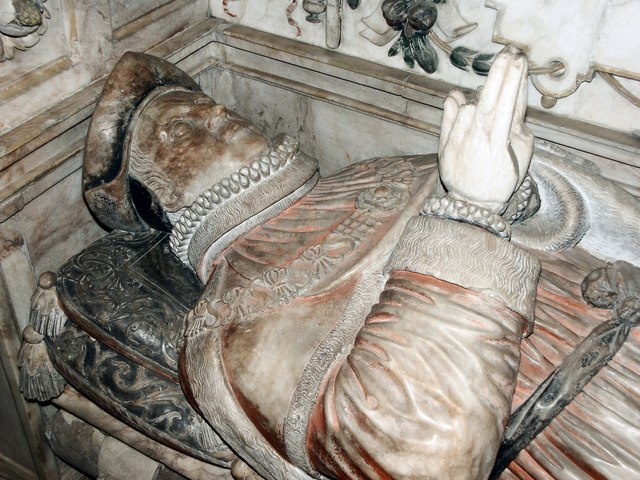
Effigy on tomb

He died on 7 May 1592, and was buried in the church of St Michael, Glentworth, Lincolnshire, where, by the aid of grants from the profits of the mint, he had built for himself a noble mansion, which was long the seat of his posterity, and of which a portion was afterwards incorporated in the modern Glentworth Hall. By his will he established a dole for the inmates of an almshouse which he had built on the estate. A sessions house at Spittal-in-the-Street was also built by him.

Wray was lord of the manors Brodsworth and Cusworth, Yorkshire, and of Ashby, Fillingham, Grainsby, and Kennington, Lincolnshire. His monument, a splendid structure in alabaster and other marbles, is in the chancel of Glentworth church. Re Justus, nomine verus: so, in allusion to his motto and with an evident play upon his name, he is characterised by the inscription. Coke praises his 'profound and judicial knowledge, accompanied with a ready and singular capacity, grave and sensible elocution, and continual and admirable patience.' No less eulogistic, though less weighty, are the encomiums of David Lloyd (State Worthies) and Fuller (Worthies of England). Their general accuracy is unquestionable; and the execution of Campion and the iniquitous sentence on Davison show that in crown cases Wray was by no means too scrupulous.

== Publications ==
Wray's judgments and charges are recorded in the reports of Dyer, Plowden, Coke, and Croke, Cobbett's State Trials, and Nicolas's Life of Davison. One of his speeches on a call of Serjeants in Michaelmas term 1578 has been preserved by Dugdale. His speech to the throne in 1571 may be read in Sir Simonds D'Ewes's Journals of all the Parliaments during the Reign of Queen Elizabeth, or in Cobbett's Parliamentary History.

For his opinions, notes of cases, letters, and other miscellaneous remains, see Peck's Desiderata Curiosa.

== Family life and descendants ==
By his wife Anne, daughter of Nicholas Girlington of Normanby, Yorkshire, Wray had issue a son and two daughters. His wife and three children were all significant puritan leaders, with Sir William Wray being described by John Smyth as the 'principal patron of godly religion in Lincolnshire.'

- The elder daughter, Isabel, married, first, Godfrey Foljambe of Aldwarke, Yorkshire, and Walton, Derbyshire, who died on 14 June 1595; secondly, in or before 1600, Sir William Bowes, who succeeded his uncle Robert Bowes in the Scottish embassy, and died on 30 October 1611; thirdly, on 7 May 1617, John, Lord Darcy of Aston, commonly called Lord Darcy of the North. She died on 12 February 1623.
- Frances, the younger daughter, married, first, in 1583, Sir George St Paul, bart. (so created on 29 June 1611), of Snarford, Lincolnshire, who died on 28 October 1613; secondly, on 21 December 1616, Robert Rich, 1st Earl of Warwick, whom she survived, dying about 1634.
- The son, Sir William Wray (1555–1617), was created a baronet on 25 November 1611, and married, first, in 1580, Lucy, eldest daughter of Sir Edward Montagu of Boughton, son of Sir Edward Montagu, by whom he was father of Sir John Wray; and, secondly, about 1600, Frances Drury, widow of Sir Nicholas Clifford, and daughter of Sir William Drury of Hawsted, Suffolk, and Elizabeth Stafford, by whom he was father of Sir Christopher Wray (1601–1646).

== Arms ==
Coat of arms of Christopher Wray

Notes
Granted 30 December 1586 by Clarenceux Cooke.
Crest
An ostrich Or.
Escutcheon
Azure on a chief Or three martlets Gules.

Political offices
Preceded by Richard Onslow	Speaker of the House of Commons; 1571	Succeeded by Sir Robert Bell
