= Constantine Jessop =

Anglican clergyman (died 1658)

Constantine Jessop (1601 or 1602 – 16 April 1658) was a 17th-century Anglican clergyman.

== Life ==
Jessop was the son of John Jessop, a minister at Pembroke, Pembrokeshire in Wales. He studied initially at Jesus College, Oxford, commencing in 1624 aged 22, before moving to Trinity College, Dublin, where he graduated with a BA from Dublin before returning to Oxford to obtain his MA in 1632. His movements thereafter are uncertain for a few years, although his son Constantine was born in 1639 or 1640. In 1643, he was appointed to the parish of Fyfield, Essex. In 1644, he argued for the biblical validity of presbyterian church government, with his views being published as The angel of the Church of Ephesus no bishop of Ephesus, distinguished in order from, and superior in power to a presbyter, dedicated to William Twisse. In August 1647, he moved from Fyfield to Bristol to take up a position as vicar of St Nicholas. In 1650, he was alleged to have preached against the council of state and, whilst protesting, did not deny all the charges. He was allowed to remain a minister on condition that he did not return to Bristol, although temporary permission was given on two occasions in 1652 and the prohibition was removed in April 1654, after Jessop had become rector of Wimborne Minster in Dorset. Also in 1654, Jessop wrote a preface to John Grayle's A Modest Vindication, entitled The nature of the covenant of grace, wherein is a discovery of the judgment of Dr. Twisse in the point of justification, clearing him from antinomianism therein. On 16 April 1658, Jessop died at Wimborne; he was buried there. He was survived by his wife, Elizabeth, and his son, Constantine, who became rector of Brington, Northamptonshire and a prebendary of Durham Cathedral.
