= John Grayle =

English Puritan minister

John Grayle or Graile (1614–1654) was an English Puritan minister.

== Life ==
Grayle was the son of John Grayle, priest, of Stone, Gloucestershire, where he was born. At the age of 18 he entered Magdalen Hall, Oxford, as a batler, and proceeded B.A. in 1634 and M.A. on 15 June 1637. Brook states that Grayle, having married, in the end of 1645, a daughter of Henry Scudder, went the next year, probably as minister, to live at Colling-bourne-Ducis, Wiltshire. He subsequently became rector of Tidworth in the same county.

Grayle died, aged 40, early in 1654, after a lingering illness. He was buried in Tidworth Church. A son of the same name, educated at Exeter College, Oxford, was rector of Blickling, Norfolk, and published sermons.

== Works ==
While a strict presbyterian, Grayle was charged with Arminianism, and defended his principles in a work, which was published after his death with a preface by Constantine Jessop, minister at Wimborne, Dorset, entitled A Modest Vindication of the Doctrine of Conditions in the Covenant of Grace and the Defenders thereof from the Aspersions of Arminianism and Popery which Mr. W. Eyre cast on them, London, 1655. The preface (dated 15 September 1654) says that the book had been delivered to William Eyre in the author's lifetime; Eyre, Grayle's critic, was minister of St Edmund's, Salisbury. A neighbouring minister, Humphrey Chambers, preached his funeral sermon, and it was published with the Modest Vindication.
