= John Darrell =

English cleric and exorcist 1562 – post-1602

John Darrell (born 1562 in or near Mansfield, Nottinghamshire, England, died after 1602) was an Anglican clergyman noted for his Puritan views and his practice as an exorcist, which led to imprisonment.

== Exorcist ==
Darrell was a sizar of Queens' College, Cambridge. In 1586 he was called to help by Isabel Foljambe and he exorcised a girl in Derbyshire, and published an account of his work. In 1596–1597 he conducted further exorcisms, mainly at St Mary's Church, Nottingham, where he was appointed curate by Robert Aldridge, but also in Lancashire, where with others he exorcised demons from seven members of the household of Nicholas Starkey in Tyldesley on 17 and 18 March 1597, and in Staffordshire. Many were sceptical about these cases, especially when Darrell claimed he knew of 13 witches in the town.

== Prosecution ==
Because of the intense public interest and the fierce arguments in Nottingham, John Whitgift, Archbishop of Canterbury, ordered an investigation. As a result, Darrell was accused of fraudulent exorcism. The prosecutor was Samuel Harsnett, who was to end his career as Archbishop of York. Harsnett's views about Darrell were published in A Declaration of Egregious Popish Impostures in 1603. Shakespeare read it, and King Lear contains the names of devils, like Flibbertigibbet and Smulkin, taken from Darrell's book. Darrell himself maintained that there was no fraud in his activities. What he wanted to prove was that Puritans were as capable as Roman Catholics in the matter of dispossessing evil spirits.

Darrell was deprived of holy orders and sent to prison, but released in 1599.

== See also ==
- Puritan exorcism
