= Henry Scudder (priest) =

English Presbyterian minister

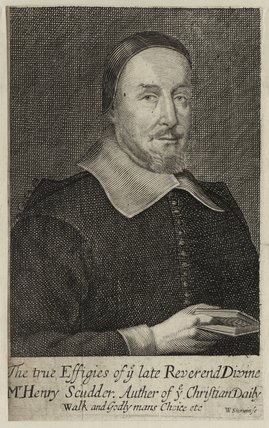
Henry Scudder, 1674 engraving by William Sherwin.

Henry Scudder (d. 1659?) was an English minister of presbyterian views, known as a devotional writer, and member of the Westminster Assembly.

== Life ==
He was a graduate of Christ's College, Cambridge, with a Cambridge Master of Arts (MA Cantab) from 1606. He was minister at Drayton in Oxfordshire 1607–19, and in 1633 was presented by the king to the living of Collingbourne-Ducis, near Marlborough, Wiltshire. In June 1643 he was summoned to the Westminster Assembly of divines. When in June 1645 an order came from the House of Commons to pray for the forces, Scudder was one of the four preachers assigned to Aldgate. He was minister at the London church of St Mildred Poultry in 1645–6. On 6 April 1647 he reported on some of the proofs of the Westminster Confession of Faith, and on 9 February 1648 his name was added to the Assembly's committee for the scriptures.

Scudder preached before the House of Commons in October 1644, on a fast day, at St. Margaret's, Westminster, and his sermon was printed by request of the house. He died before the Restoration, and his successor at Collingbourne-Ducis was instituted in 1660. He was buried in the church there, in a tomb that has been removed. He married Elizabeth, daughter of George Hunt, for fifty years rector of Collingbourne-Ducis. She died when little over twenty. Her sister married William Whately, Scudder's fellow student at Christ's College, and subsequently vicar of Banbury, whose life Scudder wrote in 1639–40. A daughter married John Grayle in 1645.

== Works ==
Scudder was author of a devotional work entitled The Christian's Daily Walke in Holy Securitie and Peace. The sixth edition, issued in 1635, has an 'Epistle to the Reader,' by John Davenport, dated from Coleman Street, 25 April 1627. The title-page describes it as first intended for private use. A German translation by Theodore Haak appeared at Frankfurt in 1636. The book was frequently reissued, The editions of 1690 and 1761 have commendations by John Owen and Richard Baxter. A fifteenth edition was issued in 1813. The edition of 1820, containing Davenport's epistle and Owen and Baxter's recommendations, has an introductory essay by Thomas Chalmers.

Scudder also published:

- 'A Key of Heaven: the Lord's Prayer opened and applied,' 1682; dedicated to 'Mr. Thomas Crew, and to all his hopeful children,' and has a preface by Richard Sibbes.
- 'Prototypes, or the Primarie Precedent Presidents out of the Booke of Genesis. With Mr. Whatelye's Life and Death,' 1640, fol., and 1647. Scudder had the assistance of Edward Leigh, like himself one of Whately's executors.

== Sources ==
- This article incorporates text from a publication now in the public domain: "Scudder, Henry". Dictionary of National Biography. London: Smith, Elder & Co. 1885–1900.
