= Puritans =

Subclass of English Reformed Protestants

The Puritans were English Protestants of the reformed theology in the 16th and 17th centuries who sought to rid the Church of England of what they considered to be Roman Catholic practices, maintaining that the Church of England had not been fully reformed and should become more Protestant. Puritanism played a significant role in English and early American history, especially in the Protectorate in Great Britain, and the earlier European settlement of New England.

Puritans were dissatisfied with the limited extent of the English Reformation and with the Church of England's toleration of certain practices associated with the Catholic Church. They formed and identified with various religious groups advocating greater purity of worship and doctrine, as well as personal and corporate piety. Puritans adopted a covenant theology, and in that sense they were Calvinists (as were many of their earlier opponents). In church polity, Puritans were divided between supporters of episcopal, presbyterian, and congregational types. Some believed a uniform reform of the established church was called for to create a religious nation, while others advocated separation from, or the end of, any established state church entirely in favour of autonomous gathered churches. These Separatist and Independents became more prominent in the 1640s, when the supporters of a presbyterian polity in the Westminster Assembly were unable to forge a new English national church.

By the late 1630s, Puritans were in alliance with the growing commercial world, with the parliamentary opposition to the royal prerogative, and with the Scottish Presbyterians with whom they had much in common. Consequently, they became a major political force in England and came to power as a result of the First English Civil War (1642–1646).

Almost all Puritan clergy left the Church of England after the restoration of the monarchy in 1660 and the Act of Uniformity 1662. Many continued to practice their faith in nonconformist denominations, especially in Congregationalist and Presbyterian churches. The nature of the Puritan movement in England changed radically. In New England, it retained its character for a longer period.

Puritanism was never a formally defined religious division within Protestantism, and the term Puritan itself was rarely used after the turn of the 18th century. Congregationalist Churches, widely considered to be a part of the Reformed tradition of Christianity, are descended from the Puritans. Moreover, Puritan beliefs are enshrined in the Savoy Declaration, the confession of faith held by the Congregationalist churches. Some Puritan ideals, including the formal rejection of Roman Catholicism, were incorporated into the doctrines of the Church of England, the mother church of the worldwide Anglican Communion.

== Terminology ==
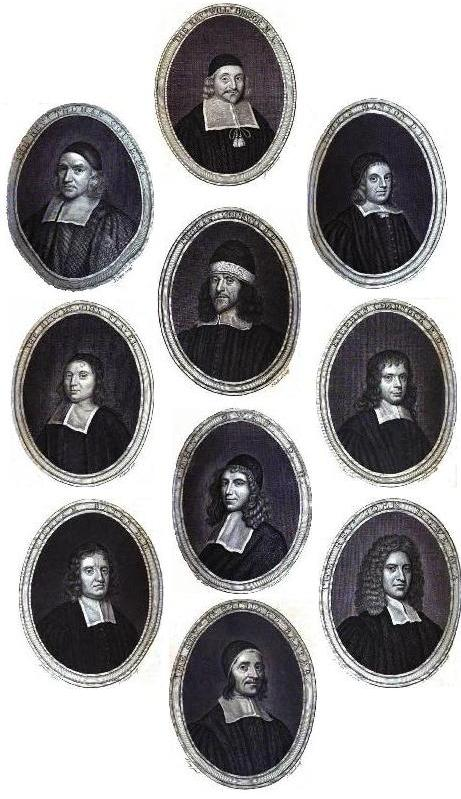
Gallery of famous 17th-century Puritan theologians: Thomas Gouge, William Bridge, Thomas Manton, John Flavel, Richard Sibbes, Stephen Charnock, William Bates, John Owen, John Howe, and Richard Baxter

In the 17th century, the word Puritan was a term applied not to just one group but to many. Historians still debate a precise definition of Puritanism. Originally, Puritan was a pejorative term characterizing certain Protestant groups as extremist. Thomas Fuller, in his Church History, dates the first use of the word to 1564. Archbishop Matthew Parker of that time used it and precisian with a sense similar to the modern stickler. Puritans, then, were distinguished for being "more intensely protestant than their protestant neighbors or even the Church of England". As a term of abuse, Puritan was not used by Puritans themselves. Those referred to as Puritan called themselves terms such as "the godly", "saints", "professors", or "God's children"; they had a "passion for their truth" which was, according to Matthew Arnold, a "sort of cast iron product, rigid, definite and complete".

"Non-separating Puritans" were dissatisfied with the Reformation of the Church of England but remained within it, advocating for further reform; they disagreed among themselves about how much further reformation was possible or even necessary. Others, who were later termed "Nonconformists", "Separatists", or "separating Puritans", thought the Church of England was so corrupt that true Christians should separate from it altogether. In its widest historical sense, the term Puritan includes both groups.

Puritans should not be confused with other radical Protestant groups of the 16th and 17th centuries, such as Quakers, Seekers, and Familists, who believed that individuals could be directly guided by the Holy Spirit. The latter denominations give precedence to direct revelation over the Bible.

In current English, puritan often means "against pleasure". In such usage, hedonism and puritanism are antonyms. William Shakespeare described the vain, pompous killjoy Malvolio in Twelfth Night as "a kind of Puritan". H. L. Mencken archly defined Puritanism as "the haunting fear that someone, somewhere, may be happy." Puritans embraced sexuality but placed it in the context of marriage. Peter Gay writes that the Puritans' standard reputation for "dour prudery" was a "misreading that went unquestioned in the nineteenth century". He said they were in favour of married sexuality, and opposed the Catholic veneration of virginity (associated with the Virgin Mary), citing Edward Taylor and John Cotton. One Puritan settlement in western Massachusetts banished a husband because he refused to fulfill his sexual duties to his wife.

== History ==
Puritanism had a historical importance over a period of a century, followed by fifty years of development in New England. It changed character and emphasis nearly decade by decade over that time.

=== Elizabethan Puritanism ===
The Elizabethan Religious Settlement of 1559 established the Church of England as a Protestant church and brought the English Reformation to a close. During the reign of Elizabeth I (r. 1558–1603), the Church of England was widely considered a Reformed church, and Calvinists held the best bishoprics and deaneries. Nevertheless, it preserved certain characteristics of medieval Catholicism, such as cathedrals, church choirs, a formal liturgy contained in the Book of Common Prayer, traditional clerical vestments, and episcopal polity.

Many English Protestants—especially those former Marian exiles returning to England to work as clergy and bishops—considered the settlement merely the first step in reforming England's church. The years of exile during the Marian Restoration had exposed them to the practices of the Continental Reformed churches. The most impatient clergy began introducing reforms within their local parishes. The initial conflict between Puritans and the authorities included instances of nonconformity, such as omitting parts of the liturgy to allow more time for the sermon and singing of metrical psalms. Some Puritans refused to bow on hearing the name of Jesus, or to make the sign of the cross in baptism, or to use wedding rings or the organ.

Yet, the main complaint Puritans had was the requirement that clergy wear the white surplice and clerical cap. Puritan clergymen preferred to wear black academic attire. During the vestments controversy, church authorities attempted and failed to enforce the use of clerical vestments. While never a mass movement, the Puritans had the support and protection of powerful patrons in the aristocracy.

In the 1570s, the primary dispute between Puritans and the authorities was over the appropriate form of church government. Many Puritans believed that the Church of England should follow the example of Reformed churches in other parts of Europe and adopt presbyterian polity, under which government by bishops would be replaced with government by elders. But all attempts to enact further reforms through Parliament were blocked by the Queen. Despite such setbacks, Puritan leaders such as John Field and James Lynch continued to promote presbyterianism through the formation of unofficial clerical conferences that allowed Puritan clergymen to organise and network. This covert Puritan network was discovered and dismantled during the Marprelate controversy of the 1580s. For the remainder of Elizabeth's reign, Puritans ceased to agitate for further reform.

=== Jacobean Puritanism ===
The accession of James I to the English throne brought the Millenary Petition, a Puritan manifesto of 1603 for reform of the English church, but James wanted a religious settlement along different lines. He called the Hampton Court Conference in 1604, and heard the teachings of four prominent Puritan leaders, including Laurence Chaderton, but largely sided with his bishops. He was well informed on theological matters by his education and Scottish upbringing, and he dealt shortly with the peevish legacy of Elizabethan Puritanism, pursuing an irenic religious policy, in which he was arbiter.

Many of James's episcopal appointments were Calvinists, notably James Montague, who was an influential courtier. Puritans still opposed much of the Roman Catholic summation in the Church of England, notably the Book of Common Prayer, but also the use of non-secular vestments (cap and gown) during services, the sign of the Cross in baptism, and kneeling to receive Holy Communion. Some of the bishops under both Elizabeth and James tried to suppress Puritanism, though other bishops were more tolerant. In many places, individual ministers were able to omit disliked portions of the revised Book of Common Prayer.

The Puritan movement of Jacobean times became distinctive by adaptation and compromise, with the emergence of "semi-separatism", "moderate puritanism", the writings of William Bradshaw (who adopted the term "Puritan" for himself), and the beginnings of Congregationalism. Most Puritans of this period were non-separating and remained within the Church of England; Separatists who left the Church of England altogether were numerically much fewer.

=== Caroline Puritanism ===
Under Charles I, the Puritans became a political force as well as a religious tendency in the country. Opponents of the royal prerogative became allies of Puritan reformers, who saw the Church of England moving in a direction opposite to what they wanted, and objected to increased Catholic influence both at Court and (as they saw it) within the Church.

After the First English Civil War political power was held by various factions of Puritans. The trials and executions of William Laud and then King Charles were decisive moves shaping British history. While in the short term Puritan power was consolidated by the Parliamentary armed forces and Oliver Cromwell, in the same years, the argument for theocracy failed to convince enough of the various groupings, and there was no Puritan religious settlement to match Cromwell's gradual assumption of dictatorial powers. The distinctive formulation of Reformed theology in the Westminster Assembly would prove to be its lasting legacy.

In New England, immigration of what were Puritan family groups and congregations was at its peak for the middle years of King Charles's reign.

=== Fragmentation and political failure ===
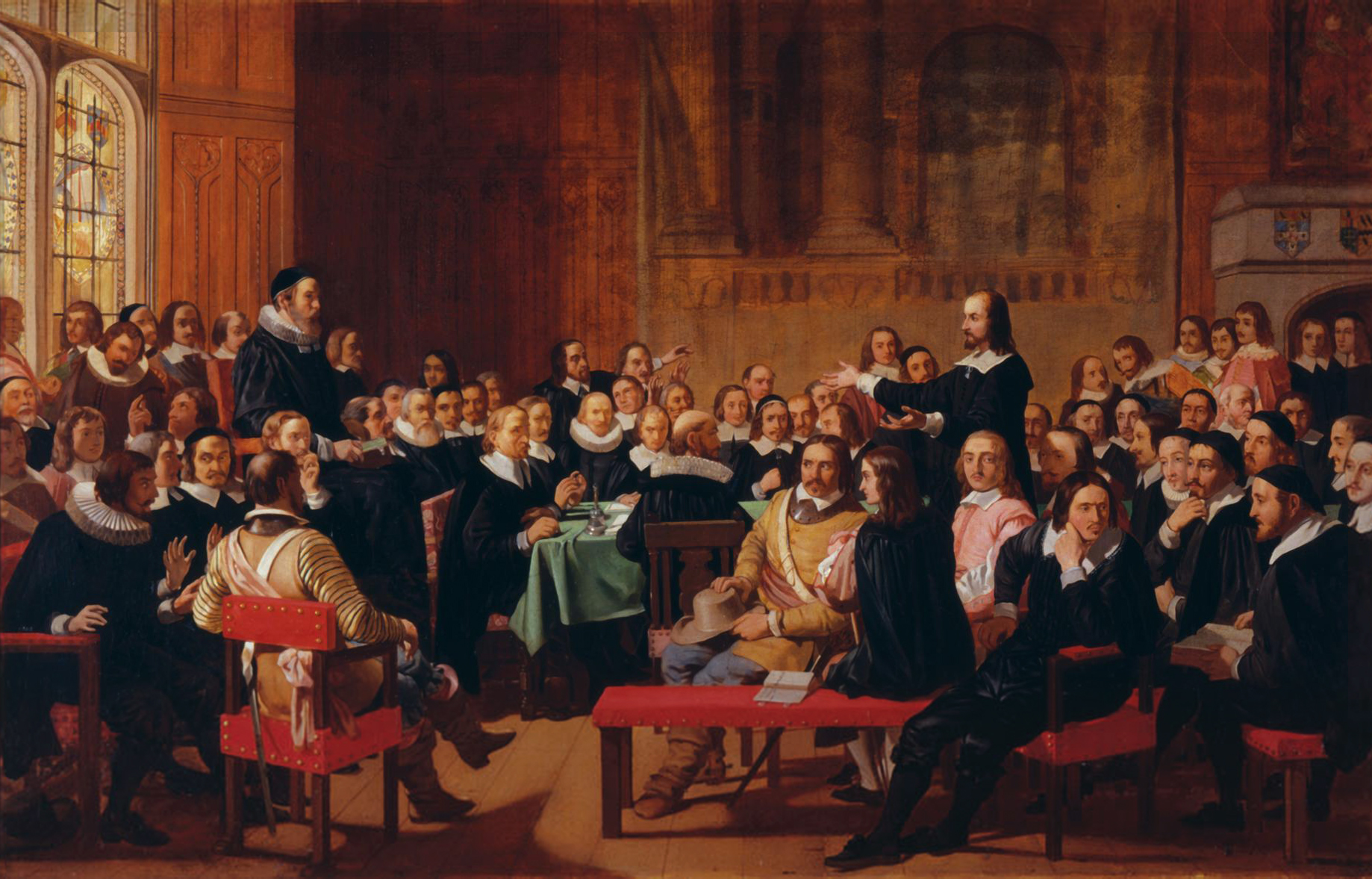
The Westminster Assembly, which saw disputes on Church polity in England (Victorian history painting by John Rogers Herbert)

The Puritan movement in England was riven over decades by emigration and inconsistent interpretations of Scripture, as well as some political differences that surfaced at that time. The Fifth Monarchy Men, a radical millenarian wing of Puritanism, aided by strident, popular clergy like Vavasor Powell, agitated from the right wing of the movement, even as sectarian groups like the Ranters, Levellers, and Quakers pulled from the left. The fragmentation created a collapse of the centre and, ultimately, sealed a political failure, while depositing an enduring spiritual legacy that would remain and grow in English-speaking Christianity.

The Westminster Assembly was called in 1643, assembling clergy of the Church of England. The Assembly was able to agree to the Westminster Confession of Faith doctrinally, a consistent Reformed theological position. The Directory of Public Worship was made official in 1645, and the larger framework (now called the Westminster Standards) was adopted by the Church of Scotland. In England, the Standards were contested by Independents up to 1660.

The Westminster Divines, on the other hand, were divided over questions of church polity and split into factions supporting a reformed episcopacy, presbyterianism, congregationalism, and Erastianism. The membership of the Assembly was strongly weighted towards the Presbyterians, but Oliver Cromwell was a Puritan and an independent Congregationalist Separatist who imposed his doctrines upon them. The Church of England of the Interregnum (1649–60) was run along Presbyterian lines but never became a national Presbyterian church, such as existed in Scotland. England was not the theocratic state which leading Puritans had called for as "godly rule".

=== Great Ejection and Dissenters ===
At the time of the English Restoration in 1660, the Savoy Conference was called to determine a new religious settlement for England and Wales. Under the Act of Uniformity 1662, the Church of England was restored to its pre-Civil War constitution with only minor changes, and the Puritans found themselves sidelined. A traditional estimate of historian Calamy is that around 2,400 Puritan clergy left the Church in the "Great Ejection" of 1662. At this point, the term "Dissenter" came to include "Puritan", but more accurately described those (clergy or lay) who "dissented" from the 1662 Book of Common Prayer.

The Dissenters divided themselves from all other Christians in the Church of England and established their own Separatist congregations in the 1660s and 1670s. An estimated 1,800 of the ejected clergy continued in some fashion as ministers of religion, according to Richard Baxter. The government initially attempted to suppress these schismatic organisations by using the Clarendon Code. There followed a period in which schemes of "comprehension" were proposed, under which Presbyterians could be brought back into the Church of England, but nothing resulted from them. The Whigs opposed the court religious policies and argued that the Dissenters should be allowed to worship separately from the established Church. This position ultimately prevailed when the Toleration Act was passed in the wake of the Glorious Revolution in 1689. This permitted the licensing of Dissenting ministers and the building of chapels. The term "Nonconformist" generally replaced the term "Dissenter" from the middle of the 18th century.

=== Puritans in North America ===
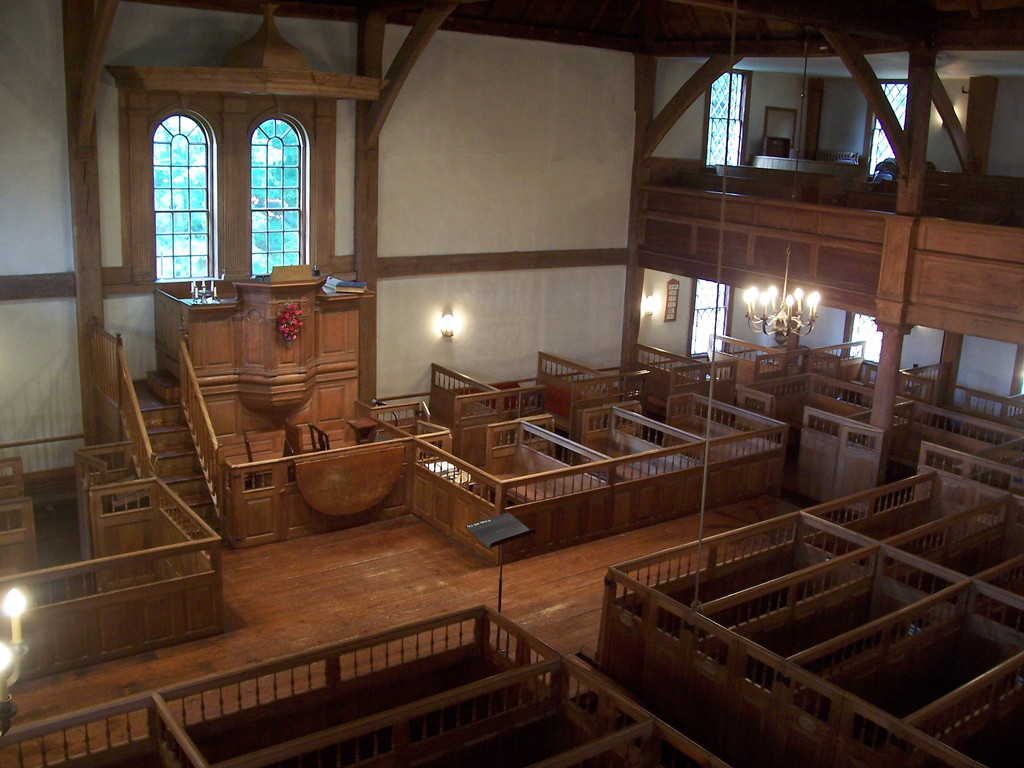
Interior of the Old Ship Church, a Puritan meetinghouse in Hingham, Massachusetts. Puritans were Calvinists, so their churches were unadorned and plain.

Some Puritans left for New England, particularly from 1629 to 1640 (Charles I's Personal Rule), supporting the founding of the Massachusetts Bay Colony and other settlements among the northern colonies. The large-scale Puritan migration to New England ceased by 1641, with around 21,000 persons having moved across the Atlantic. This English-speaking population in the United States was not descended from all of the original colonists, since many of them returned to England shortly after arriving on the continent, but it produced more than 16 million descendants. This so-called "Great Migration" is not so-named because of sheer numbers, which were much less than the number of English citizens who immigrated to Virginia and the Caribbean during this time, many as indentured servants. The rapid growth of the New England colonies (around 700,000 by 1790) was almost entirely due to the high birth rate and lower death rate per year. They had formed families more rapidly than did the southern colonies.

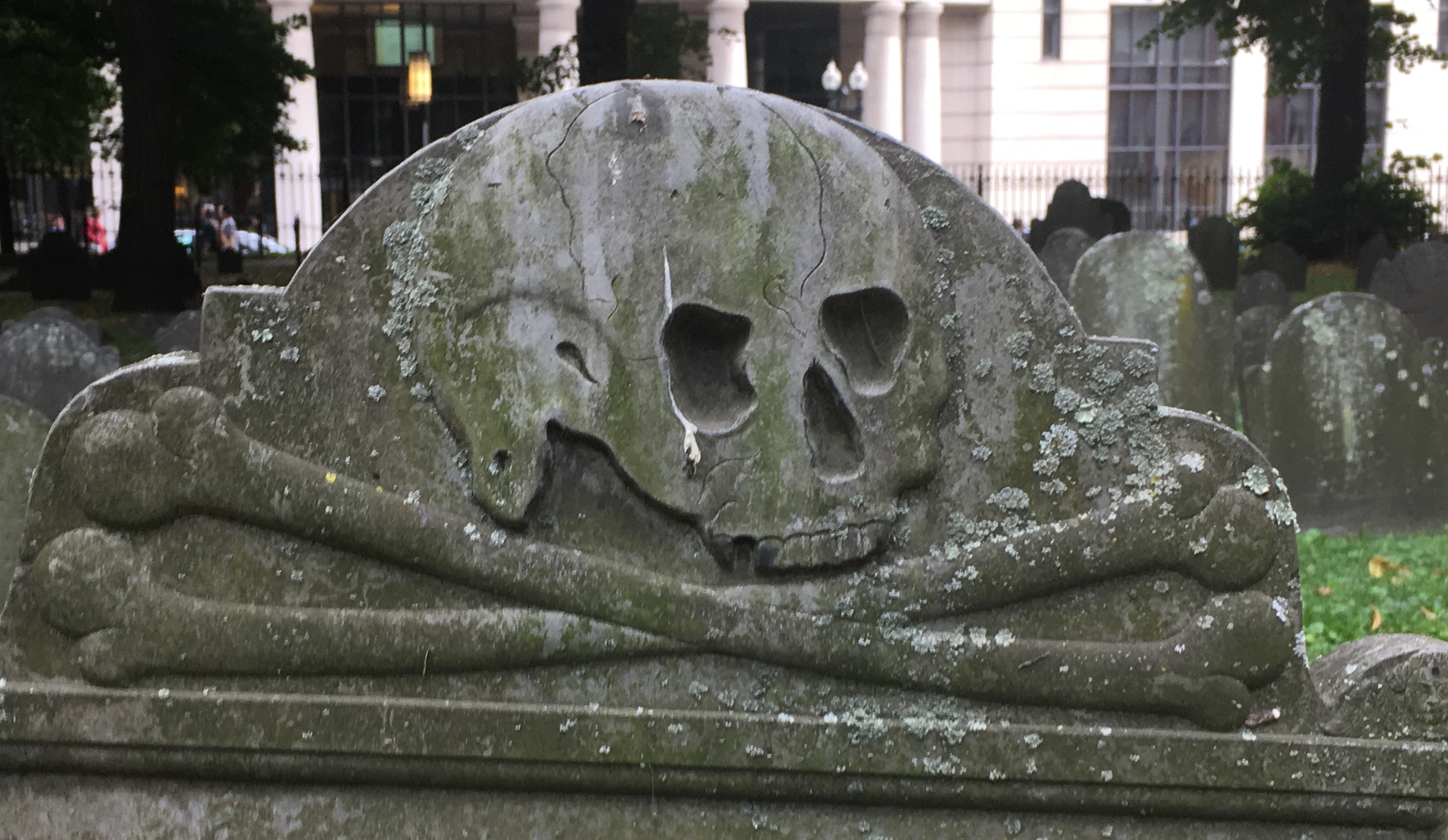
Death's head, Granary Burying Ground. A typical example of early Funerary art in Puritan New England

Puritan hegemony lasted for at least a century. That century can be broken-down into three parts: the generation of John Cotton and Richard Mather, 1630–1662 from the founding to the Restoration, years of virtual independence and nearly autonomous development; the generation of Increase Mather, 1662–1689 from the Restoration and the Halfway Covenant to the Glorious Revolution, years of struggle with the British crown; and the generation of Cotton Mather, 1689–1728 from the overthrow of Edmund Andros (in which Cotton Mather played a part) and the new charter, mediated by Increase Mather, to the death of Cotton Mather. Puritan leaders were political thinkers and writers who considered the church government to be God's agency in social life.

The Puritans in the colonies wanted their children to be able to read and interpret the Bible themselves, rather than have to rely upon the clergy for interpretation. In 1635, they established the Boston Latin School to educate their sons, the first and oldest formal education institution in the English-speaking New World. They also set-up what were called dame schools for their daughters, and in other cases, they taught their daughters at home how to read. As a result, Puritans were among the most literate societies in the world.

By the time of the American Revolution, there were 40 newspapers in the United States (at a time when there were only two cities— New York and Philadelphia, with as many as 20,000 people in them). The Puritans also set-up a college (now Harvard University) only six years after arriving in Boston.

== Beliefs ==
=== Calvinism ===
Puritanism broadly refers to a diverse religious reform movement in Britain that was committed to the Continental Reformed tradition. While Puritans did not agree upon all doctrinal points, most of them shared similar doctrines about the nature of God, human sinfulness, and the relationship between God and mankind. They believed that all of their beliefs should be based upon the Bible, which they considered to be divinely inspired.

The concept of covenant was extremely important to Puritans, and covenant theology was central to their beliefs. With roots in the writings of the Reformed theologians John Calvin and Heinrich Bullinger, covenant theology was further developed by the Puritan theologians Dudley Fenner, William Perkins, John Preston, Richard Sibbes, William Ames, and, most fully by Ames's Dutch student, Johannes Cocceius. Covenant theology asserts that when God created Adam and Eve, he promised them eternal life in return for perfect obedience, and this promise was termed "the covenant of works". After the fall of man, human nature was corrupted by original sin, and therefore unable to fulfill the covenant of works, since each person inevitably violated God's law as expressed in the Ten Commandments. As sinners, every person deserved damnation.

Puritans shared with other Calvinists a belief in double predestination, that some people (the elect) were destined by God to receive grace and salvation while others were destined for Hell. No one, however, could merit salvation. According to covenant theology, Jesus's sacrifice on the cross made possible the covenant of grace, by which people who are selected by God could be saved. Puritans believed in unconditional election and irresistible grace, which means that God's grace was given freely without condition to the elect, and could not be refused.

=== Conversion ===
Covenant theology made individual salvation deeply personal. It held that God's predestination was not "impersonal and mechanical", but was a "covenant of grace" that one entered into by faith. Therefore, being a Christian could never be reduced to simple "intellectual acknowledgment" of the truth of Christianity. Puritans agreed that the effectual call of each elect saint of God would always come as an individuated personal encounter with God's promises.

The process by which the elect are brought from spiritual death to spiritual life (regeneration) was described as conversion. Early on, Puritans did not consider a specific conversion experience normative or necessary, but many gained assurance of salvation from such experiences. Over time, however, Puritan theologians developed a framework for authentic religious experience based upon their own experiences, as well as those of their parishioners. Eventually, Puritans came to regard a specific conversion experience as an essential mark of one's election.

The Puritan conversion experience was commonly described as occurring in discrete phases. It began with a preparatory phase that was designed to produce contrition for sin via introspection, Bible study, and listening to preaching. This was followed by humiliation, when the sinner realized that he or she was helpless to break free from sin, and that their good works could never earn forgiveness. It was after reaching this point (the realization that salvation was possible only because of divine mercy) that the person would experience justification, when the righteousness of Jesus is imputed to the elect, and their minds and hearts are regenerated. For some Puritans, this was a dramatic experience, and they referred to it as being "born again".

Confirming that such a conversion had actually happened often required prolonged and continual introspection. The historian Perry Miller wrote that the Puritans "liberated men from the treadmill of indulgences and penances, but cast them on the iron couch of introspection". It was expected that conversion would be followed by sanctification, which is described as "the progressive growth in the saint's ability to better perceive and seek God's will, and thus to lead a holy life". Some Puritans attempted to find assurance of their faith via keeping detailed records of their behavior and looking for the evidence of salvation in their lives. Puritan clergy wrote many spiritual guides to help their parishioners pursue personal piety and sanctification. These included Arthur Dent's The Plain Man's Pathway to Heaven (1601), Richard Rogers's Seven Treatises (1603), Henry Scudder's Christian's Daily Walk (1627), and Richard Sibbes's The Bruised Reed and Smoking Flax (1630).

Too much emphasis upon one's good works could be criticized for being too close to Arminianism, and too much emphasis upon subjective religious experience could be criticized as Antinomianism. Many Puritans relied upon both personal religious experience and self-examination to assess their spiritual condition.

Puritanism's experiential piety would be inherited by the evangelical Protestants of the 1700s. While evangelical doctrines about conversion were heavily influenced by Puritan theology, the Puritans believed that assurance of one's salvation was rare, late in life, and "the fruit of struggle in the experience of believers", whereas evangelicals believed that assurance was normative for all people who were truly converted.

=== Worship and sacraments ===
While most Puritans were members of the Church of England, they were critical of its worship practices. In the 17th century, Sunday worship in the established church took the form of the Morning Prayer service in the Book of Common Prayer. This may include a sermon, but Holy Communion or the Lord's Supper was only occasionally observed. Officially, lay people were only required to receive communion three times a year, but most people only received communion once a year at Easter. Puritans were concerned about biblical errors and Catholic remnants within the prayer book. Puritans objected to bowing at the name of Jesus, the requirement that priests wear the surplice, and the use of written, set prayers in place of improvised prayers.

The sermon was central to Puritan piety. It was not only a means of religious education; Puritans believed it was the most common way that God prepared a sinner's heart for conversion. On Sundays, Puritan ministers often shortened the liturgy to allow more time for preaching. Puritan churchgoers attended two sermons on Sundays and as many weekday sermons and lectures they could find, often traveling for miles. Still, many villagers could access sermons with ease. Due to the social patterns of New England, Puritan households were largely middle class and close in distance, so there was not much of a distance between a church goers and their church. Puritans were distinct for their adherence to Sabbatarianism.

Puritans taught that there were two sacraments: baptism and the Lord's Supper. Puritans agreed with the church's practice of infant baptism. However, the effect of baptism was disputed. Puritans objected to the prayer book's assertion of baptismal regeneration. In Puritan theology, infant baptism was understood in terms of covenant theology—baptism replaced circumcision as a sign of the covenant and marked a child's admission into the visible church. It could not be assumed that baptism produces regeneration. The Westminster Confession states that the grace of baptism is only effective for those who are among the elect, and its effects lie dormant until one experiences conversion later in life. Puritans wanted to do away with godparents, who made baptismal vows on behalf of infants, and give that responsibility to the child's father. Puritans also objected to priests making the sign of the cross in baptism. Private baptisms were opposed because Puritans believed that preaching should always accompany sacraments. Some Puritan clergy even refused to baptise dying infants because that implied the sacrament contributed to salvation.

Puritans rejected both Roman Catholic (transubstantiation) and Lutheran (sacramental union) teachings that Christ is physically present in the bread and wine of the Lord's Supper. Instead, Puritans embraced the Reformed doctrine of real spiritual presence, believing that in the Lord's Supper the faithful receive Christ spiritually. In agreement with Thomas Cranmer, the Puritans stressed "that Christ comes down to us in the sacrament by His Word and Spirit, offering Himself as our spiritual food and drink". They criticised the prayer book service for being too similar to the Catholic mass. For example, the requirement that people kneel to receive communion implied adoration of the Eucharist, a practice linked to transubstantiation. Puritans also criticised the Church of England for allowing unrepentant sinners to receive communion. Puritans wanted better spiritual preparation (such as clergy home visits and testing people on their knowledge of the catechism) for communion and better church discipline to ensure that the unworthy were kept from the sacrament.

Puritans did not believe confirmation was necessary and thought candidates were poorly prepared since bishops did not have the time to examine them properly. The marriage service was criticised for using a wedding ring (which implied that marriage was a sacrament) and having the groom vow to his bride "with my body I thee worship", which Puritans considered blasphemous. In the funeral service, the priest committed the body to the ground "in sure and certain hope of resurrection to eternal life, through our Lord Jesus Christ." Puritans objected to this phrase because they did not believe it was true for everyone. They suggested it be rewritten as "we commit his body [etc.] believing a resurrection of the just and unjust, some to joy, and some to punishment."

Puritans eliminated choral music and musical instruments in their religious services because these were associated with Roman Catholicism; however, singing the Psalms was considered appropriate (see Exclusive psalmody). Church organs were commonly damaged or destroyed in the Civil War period, such as when an axe was taken to the organ of Worcester Cathedral in 1642.

=== Ecclesiology ===
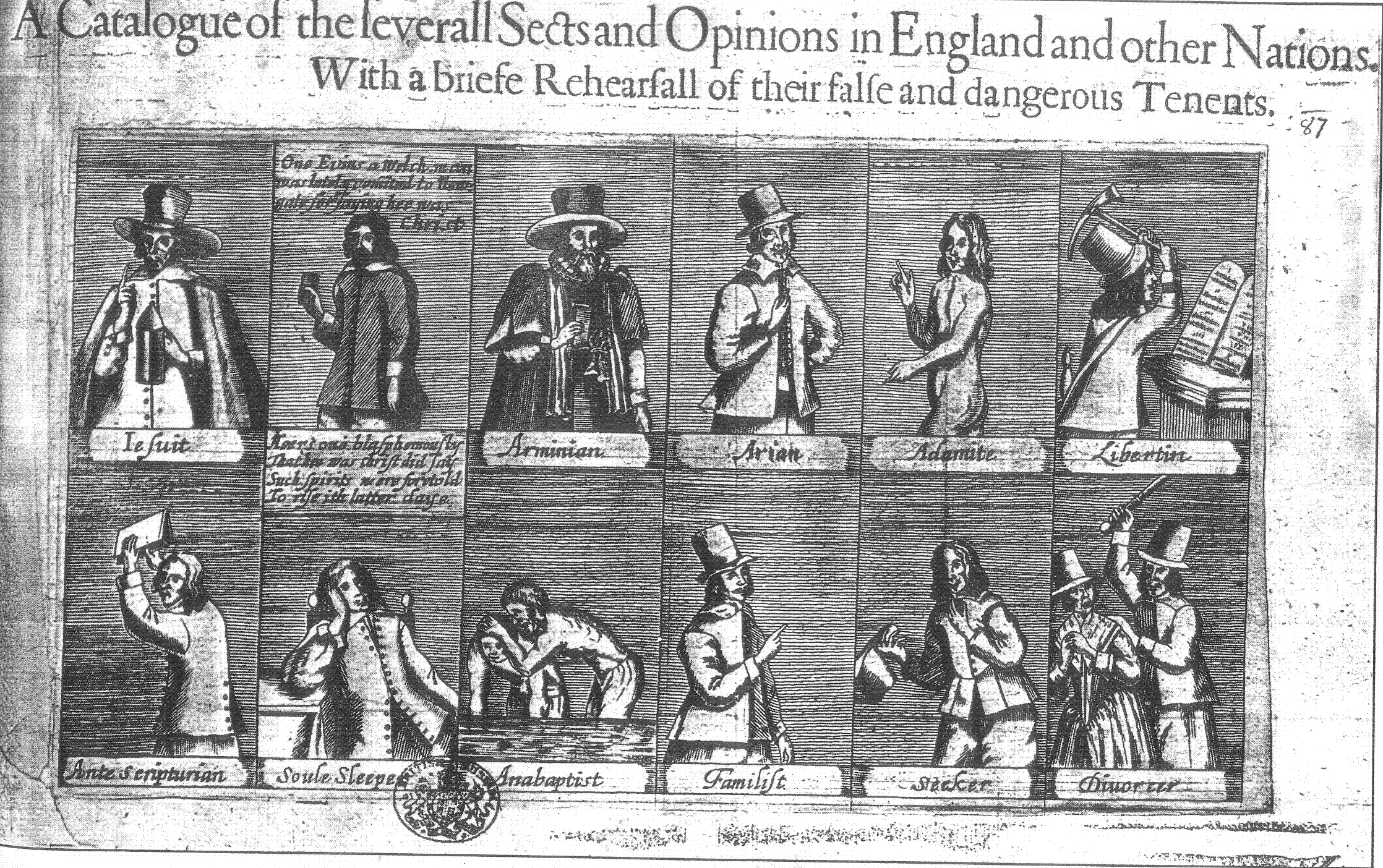
Polemical popular print with a Catalogue of Sects, 1647

While the Puritans were united in their goal of furthering the English Reformation, they were always divided over issues of ecclesiology and church polity, specifically questions that relate to the manner of organizing congregations, how individual congregations should relate with one another, and whether established national churches were scriptural. On these questions, Puritans divided between supporters of episcopal polity, presbyterian polity, and congregational polity.

The episcopalians (known as the prelatical party) were conservatives, who supported retaining bishops if those leaders supported reform and agreed to share power with local churches. They also supported the idea of having a Book of Common Prayer, but they were against demanding strict conformity or having too much ceremony. In addition, these Puritans called for a renewal of preaching, pastoral care, and Christian discipline within the Church of England.

Like the episcopalians, the presbyterians agreed that there should be a national church, but one that is structured upon the model of the Church of Scotland. They wanted to replace bishops with a system of elective and representative governing bodies of clergy and laity (local sessions, presbyteries, synods, and ultimately a national general assembly). During the Interregnum, the presbyterians had limited success at reorganizing the Church of England. The Westminster Assembly proposed the creation of a presbyterian system, but the Long Parliament left implementation to local authorities. As a result, the Church of England never developed a complete presbyterian hierarchy.

Congregationalists or Independents believed in the autonomy of the local church, which ideally would be a congregation of "visible saints" (meaning those who had experienced conversion). Members would be required to abide by a church covenant, in which they "pledged to join in the proper worship of God and to nourish each other in the search for further religious truth". Such churches were regarded as complete within themselves, with full authority to determine their own membership, administer their own discipline, and ordain their own ministers. Furthermore, the sacraments would only be administered to those in the church covenant.

Most congregational Puritans remained within the Church of England, hoping to reform it according to their own doctrines. The New England Congregationalists were also adamant that they were not separating from the Church of England. However, some Puritans equated the Church of England with the Roman Catholic Church, and therefore considered it to be no Christian church at all. These groups, such as the Brownists, would split from the established church, and become known as Separatists. Other Separatists embraced more radical positions, particularly on the subject of believer's baptism, and became early Baptists.

=== Church and State ===
Calvin taught that if worldly rulers rise-up against God, then they should be put down, which could be hard to reconcile with the claims of divine right monarchy. Puritan doctrines on church and state were also affected by their doctrines about church governance, with people who favoured more centralised models tending to favour a closer relationship between the church and the state, as well as other foreign models and their changing relationship with the English state.

The initial Puritan vision on the proper relationship between church and state in England was of an established reformed national church on the model of Calvin's Geneva, who had been more careful than the previous reformers Luther and Zwingli to keep church structures and city authorities apart. Geneva hosted many of the Marian exiles of the 1550s, who formed the core of the early Puritans. The fellow exile John Knox had implemented a reformed national church in the neighbouring Kingdom of Scotland in the early 1560s. Despite the Elizabethan Settlement of 1559 creating a Protestant Church of England with many Calvinist bishops, the vestments controversy of the 1570s did show the limits of Puritan influence upon the church.

Many Independents, did not support a compulsory national church, but believed that civil government should enforce godly discipline by upholding the moral teachings of Scripture. This included the Puritan settlers in the New England Colonies between 1620 and 1640, who established colony-supported churches and governments which closely intertwined civil law with religious practice, and often the right to vote linked to church membership.

However, a minority of Puritan Separatists known as Brownists, from as early as the 1580s, rejected the notion of a state church altogether, and argued for congregations to remain independent from civil power, with another Separatist Roger Williams in 1636 setting-up Providence Plantations with a formal separation of church and state.

During the Interregnum, led by the Independent Oliver Cromwell, starting in 1649, the parish system was retained, and ministers were financed via tithes, but oversight was exercised by state-appointed commissions such as the Triers and Ejectors, allowing a range of Protestant congregations to receive support while excluding Catholics and radical sects.

On 27 September 1650, the Rump Parliament of the Commonwealth of England passed an Act repealing the Act of Supremacy, Act of Uniformity, and all laws making recusancy a crime. There was no longer a legal requirement to attend the parish church on Sundays (for both Protestants and Catholics). In 1653, responsibility for recording births, marriages, and deaths was transferred from the church to a civil registrar. The result was that church baptisms and marriages became private acts, not guarantees of legal rights, which provided greater equality to dissenters.

The 1653 Instrument of Government guaranteed that in matters of religion, "none shall be compelled by penalties or otherwise, but endeavours be used to win them by sound Doctrine and the Example of a good conversation". Religious freedom was given to "all who profess Faith in God by Jesus Christ". However, Catholics and some others were excluded. No one was executed for their religion during the Protectorate. In London, people who attended Catholic mass or Anglican holy communion were occasionally arrested, but released without charge. Many unofficial Protestant congregations, such as Baptist churches, were permitted to meet. Quakers were allowed to publish freely and to hold meetings. They were, however, arrested for disrupting parish church services and organising tithe-strikes against the state church.

After the Great Ejection of 1662 expelled Puritans from the Church of England, most of them became nonconformists, worshipping outside of the established church.

=== Family life ===
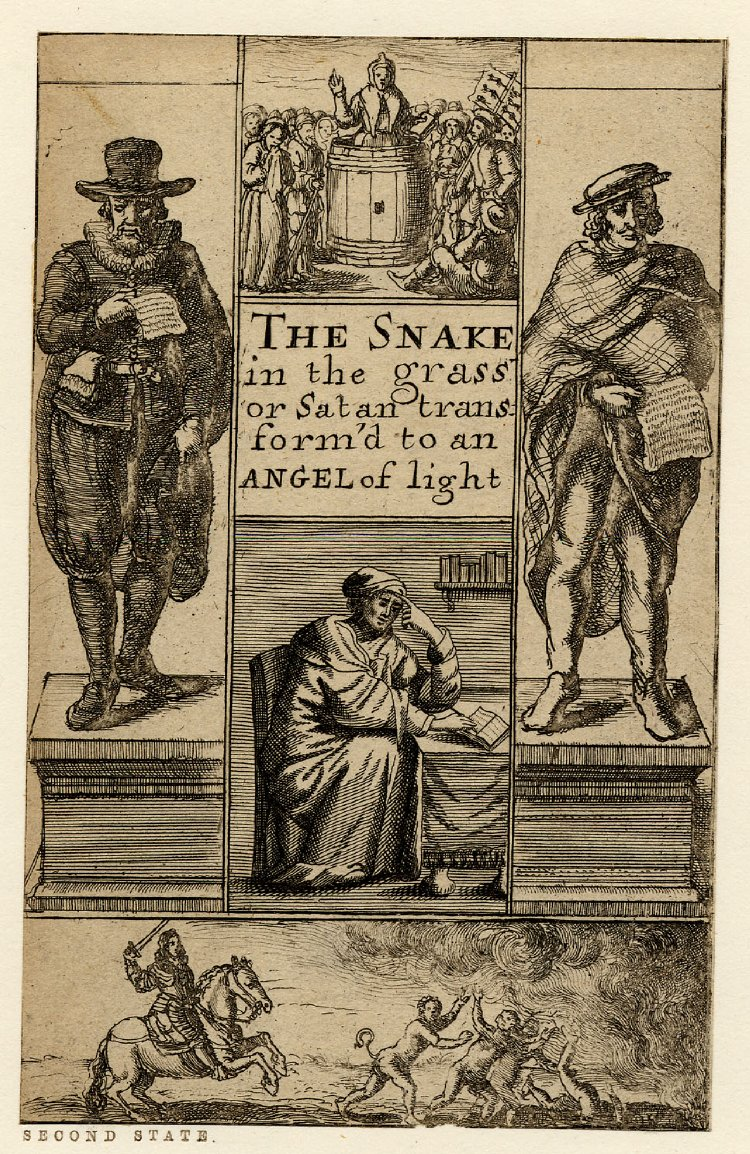
The Snake in the Grass or Satan Transform'd to an Angel of Light, title page engraved by Richard Gaywood, c. 1660

Based on Biblical portrayals of Adam and Eve, Puritans believed that marriage was rooted in procreation, love, and, most importantly, salvation. Husbands were the spiritual heads of the household, while women were to demonstrate religious piety and obedience under male authority. Furthermore, marriage represented not only the relationship between husband and wife, but also the relationship between spouses and God. Puritan husbands commanded authority through family direction and prayer. The female relationship to her husband and to God was marked by submissiveness and humility.

Thomas Gataker describes Puritan marriage as:

... together for a time as copartners in grace here, [that] they may reigne together forever as coheires in glory hereafter.

The paradox created by female inferiority in the public sphere and the spiritual equality of men and women in marriage, then, gave way to the informal authority of women concerning matters of the home and childrearing. With the consent of their husbands, wives made important decisions concerning the labour of their children, property, and the management of inns and taverns owned by their husbands. Pious Puritan mothers laboured for their children's righteousness and salvation, connecting women directly to matters of religion and morality. In her poem titled "In Reference to her Children", poet Anne Bradstreet reflects on her role as a mother:

I had eight birds hatched in one nest; Four cocks there were, and hens the rest. I nursed them up with pain and care, Nor cost nor labour I did spare.

Bradstreet alludes to the temporality of motherhood by comparing her children to a flock of birds on the precipice of leaving home. While Puritans praised the obedience of young children, they also believed that, by separating children from their mothers at adolescence, children could better sustain a superior relationship with God. A child could only be redeemed through religious education and obedience. Girls carried the additional burden of Eve's corruption and were catechised separately from boys at adolescence. Boys' education prepared them for vocations and leadership roles, while girls were educated for domestic and religious purposes. The pinnacle of achievement for children in Puritan society, however, occurred with the conversion process.

Puritans viewed the relationship between master and servant similarly to that of parent and child. Just as parents were expected to uphold Puritan religious values in the home, masters assumed the parental responsibility of housing and educating young servants. Older servants also dwelt with masters and were cared for in the event of illness or injury. African-American and Indian servants were likely excluded from such benefits.

=== Gender and punishment ===
Many Puritan communities operated under strict values that determined gender roles and generally “pure” behavior. Many of these values were shaped from their interpretation of the Bible. If anyone in the community was found to have disobeyed or strayed from these values, they would be reported and put through the censure process. This involved a public confession from the accused of their wrongdoings. People would be censured for things that ranged from immodesty and cursing to domestic abuse and fornication. Religious leaders would often make an example of the censured individual by turning their experience into a lesson for the congregation. In some cases, ministers or elders would meet with an individual to counsel them for a “private sin,” such as impiety or struggles with faith, before taking public action. In 1648, Puritan minister Thomas Hooker explained the necessity of church discipline: “[God] hath appointed Church-censures as good Physick, to purge out what is evill, as well as Word and Sacraments, which, like good diet, are sufficient to nourish the soul to eternal life.” They saw these practices as necessary for the community to keep each other in check and in line with their “godly paths.”

While Puritan doctrine viewed men and women spiritually equal, laymen reinterpreted spirituality to reflect their ideas of masculinity. Men displayed their spirituality through their public actions and behaviors, such as being a good neighbor to the community and father to their families. Women were expected to reflect their inner spirituality with their entire being. The human soul was often described using feminine language, but men were allowed to separate their mind and body from their souls in order to maintain an image of masculinity on the outside. The husband was the patriarch with ultimate authority, and the wife would be his assistant. If any of the other members of the family misbehaved, such as the children or even their mother, their actions reflected the capability of the father to be the head of the household. Thus, men were often called out for not fulfilling their role as a good father, husband, and/or neighbor.

As a result of this reinterpretation of the Puritan doctrine to reflect certain gendered beliefs, the things men and women were censured for differed. For example, women were often associated with “Eve,” a temptress and sinful seductress. This led to women being censured for fornication far more often than men. Men, on the other hand, had more of a focus on civil duty, being censured for filing false lawsuits, arguing over property lines, charging inflated prices, tearing down a neighbor’s mill, land fraud, or poor military conduct. In the economic sphere, women lacked formal power. Thus, men were censured more often for poor business practices.

The audience played a large role in censures, listening for certain words that demonstrated the accused was truly remorseful for their actions. Similar to the distinction between female and male spirituality, the language women and men used in their confessions differed. The feminized language expected from women included words such as “shame,” “wounded,” “great sin,” “nature,” “pity,” “evil,” “poor,” and “grief.” On the other hand, men used more objective phrases such as “rules,” breach,” offense,” desire,” forgiveness,” actions,” and “brethren.”

The difference in treatment for men and women was reflected even in the specific sins they were accused of committing. As stated earlier, women were rarely censured for economic disputes as they lacked influence in that regard. Thus, if a commercial dispute involving a woman were to arise, the congregation treated her differently than a man. Such was the case for a woman named Chaplain: “In 1696, Dorchester’s Sister Chaplain borrowed money from John Green to buy a shipment of wine. When Green died and his estate tried to collect the debt from Chaplain, she refused. The congregation did not cite her for breaking a contract, but censured her for lying.” Women would also at times face harsher punishments than men for the same sin. “Boston's Second Church censured John Farnum for making bad comments about another church and its pastor, and they noted he was "breaking the rule of truth." However, that same congregation recorded much harsher words about Sarah Stevens, whom they admonished for "many evill carriages and sundry filthy speeches, not fit to be named." And when they censured her, they said she "grew more vile and hard hearted." The court also took up her case and sentenced her to jail and two whippings.”

=== Demonology and witch hunts ===
Like most Christians in the early modern period, Puritans believed in the active existence of the devil and demons as evil forces that could possess and cause harm to men and women. There was also widespread belief in witchcraft and witches—persons in league with the devil. "Unexplained phenomena such as the death of livestock, human disease, and hideous fits suffered by young and old" may all be blamed on the agency of the devil or a witch.

Puritan pastors undertook exorcisms for demonic possession in some high-profile cases. Exorcist John Darrell was supported by Arthur Hildersham in the case of Thomas Darling. Samuel Harsnett, a sceptic on witchcraft and possession, attacked Darrell. However, Harsnett was in the minority, and many clergy, not only Puritans, believed in witchcraft and possession.

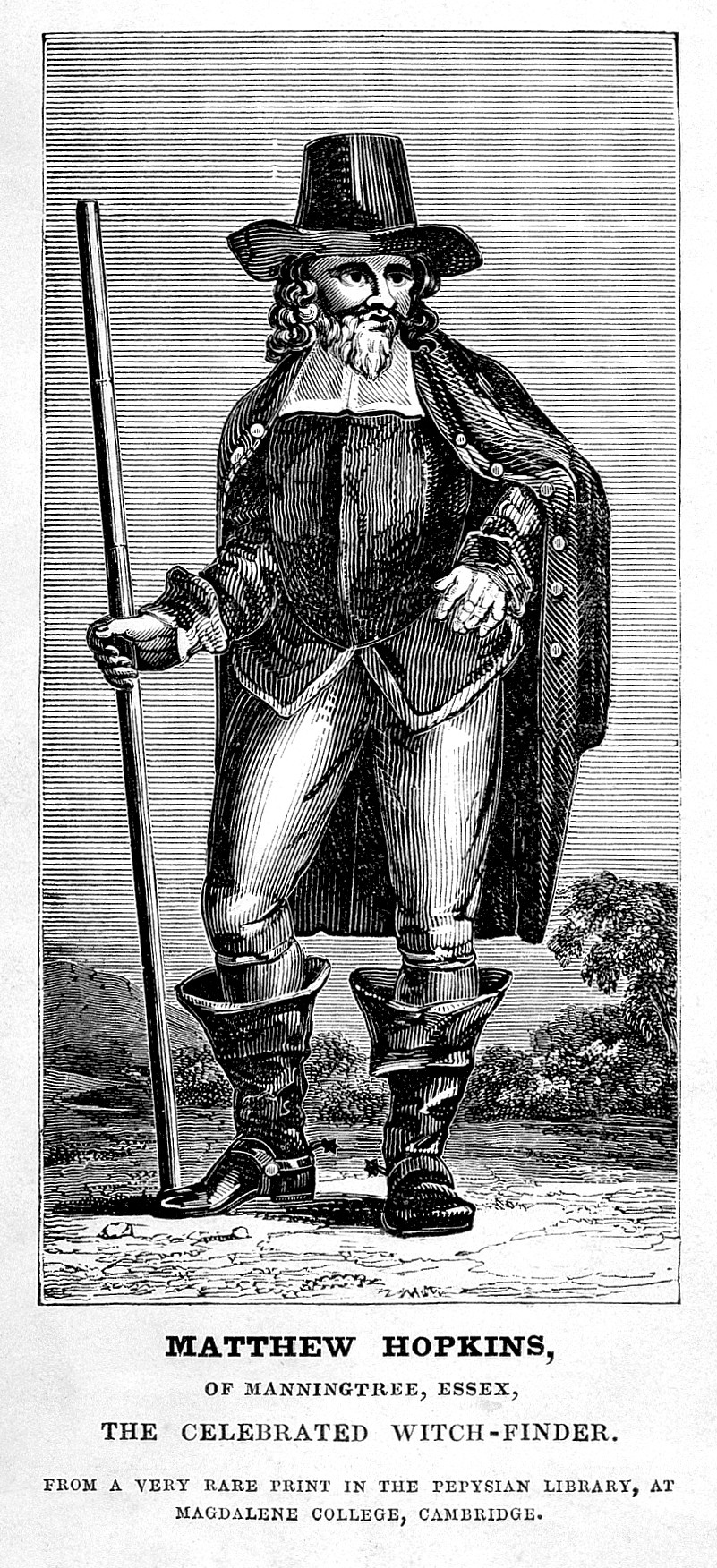
Matthew Hopkins, the self-styled "Witchfinder General", who was mainly active in East Anglia

In the 16th and 17th centuries, thousands of people throughout Europe were accused of being witches and executed. In England and Colonial America, Puritans engaged in witch hunts as well. In the 1640s, Matthew Hopkins, the self-proclaimed "Witchfinder General", whose career flourished during Puritan rule, was responsible for accusing over two hundred people of witchcraft, mainly in East Anglia. Between 1644 and 1647, Hopkins and his colleague John Stearne sent more accused people to the gallows than all the other witch-hunters in England of the previous 160 years. In New England, about eighty people throughout the Puritan-controlled Massachusetts Bay Colony were accused of witchcraft; thirteen women and two men were executed between 1645 and 1663.

The Salem witch trials of 1692 had a lasting impact on the historical reputation of New England Puritans. Though this witch hunt occurred after Puritans lost political control of the Massachusetts colony, Puritans instigated the judicial proceedings against the accused and comprised the members of the court that convicted and sentenced the accused. By the time Governor William Phips ended the trials, fourteen women and five men had been hanged as witches. The main accusation brought against witches was evidence of maleficium, which referred to a witch's meddling of misfortune such as dead livestock or illness. At Salem, the concern was primarily about the spectral possession and torment, or bewitchment, of the young female victims, especially torment that occurred in the courtroom. Many clergymen refer to this bewitchment as having a direct relation to the Devil, more so than maleficium.

Though men and women were both tried for witchcraft, the accusations were skewed toward women. About 78 percent of accused witches in New England were women, and those women were often societal pariahs: poor, homeless, childless, or women with inherited property. Men accused of witchcraft tended to have familial or sexual relations with female witches. In the Salem witch trials, six male witches were accused, and four of them had wives who were also accused, and several has accusations of domestic violence or murder. There was a clear correlation between women and violence in New England witchcraft accusations.

=== Millennialism ===
Puritan millennialism has been placed in the broader context of European Reformed beliefs about the millennium and interpretation of biblical prophecy, for which representative figures of the period were Johannes Piscator, Thomas Brightman, Joseph Mede, Johannes Heinrich Alsted, and John Amos Comenius. Like most English Protestants of the time, Puritans based their eschatological beliefs upon a historicist interpretation of the Book of Revelation and the Book of Daniel. Protestant theologians identified the sequential phases that the world must pass through before the Last Judgment could occur, and tended to place their own time period near the end. It was expected that tribulation and persecution would increase, but eventually the church's enemies, namely the Antichrist (identified with the Roman Catholic Church) and the Ottoman Empire, would be defeated. Based upon Revelation 20, it was believed that a thousand-year period (the millennium) would occur, during which the saints would rule with Jesus on Earth.

In contrast to other Protestants who tended to view eschatology as an explanation for "God's remote plans for the world and man", Puritans understood it to describe "the cosmic environment in which the regenerate soldier of Christ was now to do battle against the power of sin". On a personal level, eschatology was related to sanctification, assurance of salvation, and the conversion experience. On a larger level, eschatology was the lens through which events such as the English Civil War and the Thirty Years' War were interpreted. There was also an optimistic aspect to Puritan millennianism: Puritans anticipated a future worldwide religious revival before the Second Coming of Jesus. Another departure from other Protestants was the widespread belief among Puritans that the conversion of the Jews to Christianity was an important sign of the apocalypse.

== Cultural consequences ==
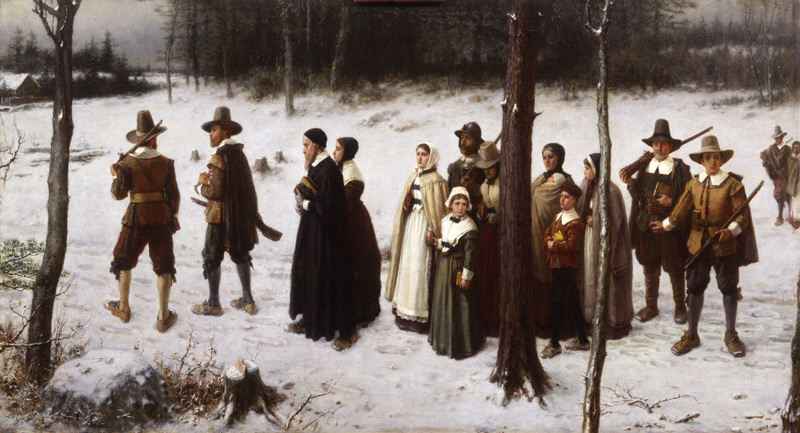
Pilgrims Going to Church by George Henry Boughton (1867)

Some strong religious beliefs common to Puritans had direct impacts on culture. Puritans believed it was the government's responsibility to enforce moral standards and ensure true religious worship was established and maintained. Education was essential to every person, male and female, so that they could read the Bible for themselves. However, the Puritans' emphasis on individual spiritual independence was not always compatible with the community cohesion that was also a strong ideal. Anne Hutchinson (1591–1643), the well educated daughter of a teacher, argued with the established theological orthodoxy, and was forced to leave colonial New England with her followers.

=== Education ===
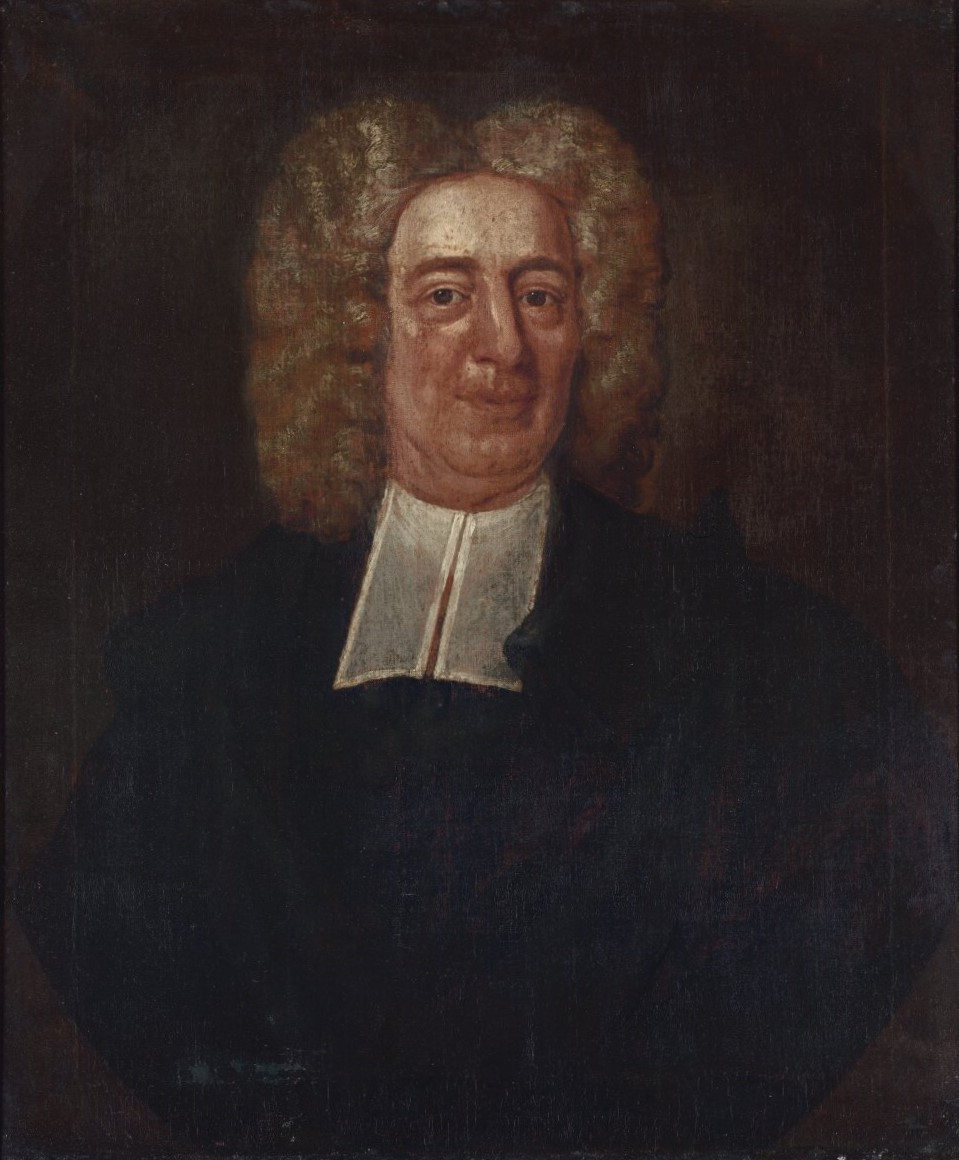
Cotton Mather, influential New England Puritan minister, portrait by Peter Pelham

At a time when the literacy rate in England was less than 30 per cent, the Puritan leaders of colonial New England believed that children should be educated for both religious and civil reasons, and they worked to achieve universal literacy. In 1642, Massachusetts required heads of households to teach their wives, children, and servants basic reading and writing, so that they could read the Bible and understand colonial laws. In 1647, the government required all towns with 50 or more households to hire a teacher, and required towns of 100 or more households to hire a grammar school instructor, to prepare promising boys for college. Philemon Pormort's Boston Latin School was the only one in Boston, the first school of public instruction in Massachusetts". Boys who were interested in the ministry were often sent to colleges such as Harvard (founded in 1636) or Yale (founded in 1707). Aspiring lawyers or doctors apprenticed to a local practitioner, or in rare cases, were sent to England or Scotland.

=== Puritan scientists ===
The Merton Thesis is an argument about the nature of early experimental science proposed by Robert K. Merton. Similarly to Max Weber's famous claim on the link between the Protestant work ethic and the capitalist economy, Merton argued for a similar positive correlation between the rise of English Puritanism, as well as German Pietism, and early experimental science. As an example, seven of 10 nucleus members of the Royal Society were Puritans. In the year 1663, 62 per cent of the members of the Royal Society were similarly identified. The Merton Thesis has resulted in continuous debates.

=== Behavioral regulations ===
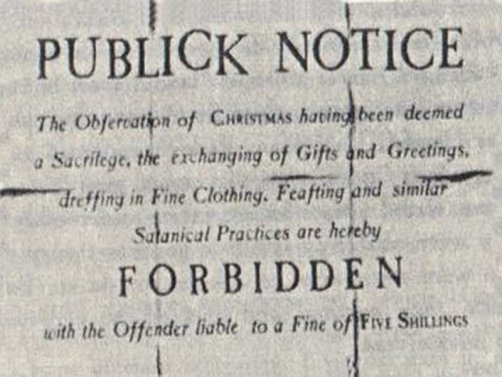
1659 public notice in Boston forbidding the celebration of Christmas

Puritans in both England and New England believed that the state should protect and promote true religion and that religion should influence politics and social life. Certain holidays were outlawed when Puritans came to power. In 1647, Parliament outlawed the celebration of Christmas, Easter and Whitsuntide. Puritans strongly condemned the celebration of Christmas, considering it a Catholic invention and the "trappings of popery" or the "rags of the Beast". They also objected to Christmas because the festivities surrounding the holiday were seen as impious (English jails were usually filled with drunken revelers and brawlers). During the years that the Puritan ban on Christmas was in place in England, protests occurred over the repressiveness of the Puritan regime. Pro-Christmas rioting broke out across England, semi-clandestine religious services marking Christ's birth continued to be held, and people sang carols in secret. Following the restoration in 1660, when Puritan legislation was declared null and void, Christmas was again freely celebrated in England. Christmas was outlawed in Boston from 1659. The ban was revoked in 1681 by the English-appointed governor Edmund Andros, who also revoked a Puritan ban on festivities on Saturday nights. Nevertheless, it was not until the mid-19th century that celebrating Christmas became fashionable in the Boston region.

Attempting to force religious and intellectual homogeneity on the whole community, civil and religious restrictions were most strictly applied by the Puritans of Massachusetts which saw various banishments applied to enforce conformity, including the branding iron, the whipping post, the bilboes and the hangman's noose. Swearing and blasphemy were illegal. In 1636, Massachusetts made blasphemy—defined as "a cursing of God by atheism, or the like"—punishable by death.

Puritans were opposed to Sunday sport or recreation because these distracted from religious observance of the Sabbath. In an attempt to offset the strictness of the Puritans, James I's Book of Sports (1618) permitted Christians to play football every Sunday afternoon after worship. When the Puritans established themselves in power, football was among the sports that were banned: boys caught playing on Sunday could be prosecuted. Football was also used as a rebellious force: when Puritans outlawed Christmas in England in December 1647 the crowd brought out footballs as a symbol of festive misrule. Other forms of leisure and entertainment were completely forbidden on moral grounds. For example, Puritans were universally opposed to blood sports such as bearbaiting and cockfighting because they involved unnecessary injury to God's creatures. For similar reasons, they also opposed boxing. These sports were illegal in England during Puritan rule.

While card playing by itself was generally considered acceptable, card playing and gambling were banned in England and the colonies, as was mixed dancing involving men and women—which Mather condemned as "promiscuous dancing"—because it was thought to lead to fornication. Folk dance that did not involve close contact between men and women was considered appropriate. The branle dance, which involved couples intertwining arms or holding hands, returned to popularity in England after the restoration when the bans imposed by the Puritans were lifted. In New England, the first dancing school did not open until the end of the 17th century.

Puritans condemned the sexualization of the theatre and its associations with depravity and prostitution—London's theatres were located on the south side of the Thames, which was a center of prostitution. A major Puritan attack on the theatre was William Prynne's book Histriomastix which marshals a multitude of ancient and medieval authorities against the "sin" of dramatic performance. Puritan authorities shut down English theatres in the 1640s and 1650s—Shakespeare's Globe Theatre was demolished—and none were allowed to open in Puritan-controlled colonies. In January 1643, actors in London protested against the ban with a pamphlet titled The Actors remonstrance or complaint for the silencing of their profession, and banishment from their severall play-houses. With the end of Puritan rule and the restoration of Charles II, theatre among other arts exploded, and London's oldest operating theatre, Drury Lane in the West End, opened in 1663. The puppet show Punch and Judy, dominated by the anarchic Mr Punch, made its first recorded appearance in England in May 1662, with show historian Glyn Edwards stating:

"[Punch] went down particularly well with Restoration British audiences, fun-starved after years of Puritanism ... he became, really, a spirit of Britain – a subversive maverick who defies authority".

Puritans were not opposed to drinking alcohol in moderation. However, alehouses were closely regulated by Puritan-controlled governments in both England and Colonial America. Laws in Massachusetts in 1634 banned the "abominable" practice of individuals toasting each other's health. William Prynne, the most rabid of the Puritan anti-toasters, wrote a book on the subject, Health's Sicknesse (1628), that "this drinking and quaffing of healthes had it origin and birth from Pagans, heathens, and infidels, yea, from the very Deuill himself."

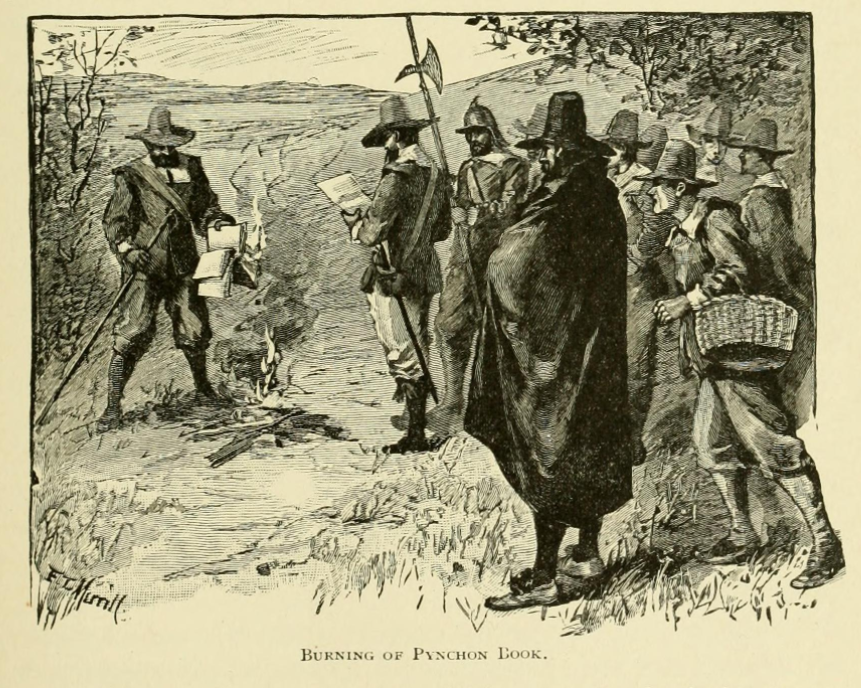
19th-century portrayal of the burning of William Pynchon's banned book on Boston Common after it was deemed blasphemous by the Massachusetts Bay Colony

In 1649, English colonist William Pynchon, the founder of Springfield, Massachusetts, wrote a critique of Puritanical Calvinism, entitled The Meritorious Price of Our Redemption. Published in London in 1650, when the book reached Boston it was immediately burned on Boston Common and the colony pressed Pynchon to return to England which he did. The censorious nature of the Puritans and the region they inhabited would lead to the phrase "banned in Boston" being coined in the late 19th century, a phrase which was applied to Boston up to the mid-20th century.

Bounds were not set on enjoying sexuality within the bounds of marriage, as a gift from God. Spouses were disciplined if they did not perform their sexual marital duties, in accordance with 1 Corinthians 7 and other biblical passages. Women and men were equally expected to fulfill marital responsibilities. Women and men could file for divorce based on this issue alone. In Massachusetts colony, which had some of the most liberal colonial divorce laws, one out of every six divorce petitions was filed on the basis of male impotence. Puritans publicly punished drunkenness and sexual relations outside marriage. Couples who had sex during their engagement were fined and publicly humiliated. Men, and a handful of women, who engaged in homosexual behavior, were seen as especially sinful, with some executed. While death was occasionally the punishment for rape and adultery, homosexuality was actually seen as a worse sin. Passages from the Old Testament, including Lev 20:13., were thought to support the disgust for homosexuality and efforts to purge society of it. New Haven code stated "If any man lyeth with mankinde, as a man lyeth with a woman, both of them have committed abomination, they shall surely be put to death" and in 1636 the Plymouth Colony adopted a set of laws that included a sentence of death for sodomy and buggery. Prominent authors such as Thomas Cobbert, Samual Danforth and Cotton Mather wrote pieces condemning homosexuality. Mather argued that the passage "Overcome the Devil when he tempts you to the youthful sin of Uncleanness" was referring "probably to the young men of Sodom".

=== Political Radicalism ===
Puritan political thought continued to shape political culture on both sides of the Atlantic, influencing both the ideology of the American Revolution the development of British liberal tradition.

Puritanism contributed to the American Revolution partly through a sense that America was part of God's plan but mainly through the genesis of the eighteenth-century British Radical Whigs. The revolution's ideological basis was largely provided by the Radical Whigs, specifically the Commonwealthmen, who had been inspired by earlier Puritan writers such as Algernon Sidney, John Milton, James Harrington and Henry Neville. Robert Middlekauff argues that the comparatively secularized Radical Whig analysis fell on fertile American ground due to the Puritanism of the previous century that bequeathed a suspicion of executive authority although there are scholars such as Zera Fink who argued that Puritan political radicalism also owed a debt to Classical republicanism ultimately from Ancient Greece.

In England, the historic alliance between Nonconformists and Whiggery - and later the Liberal Party - was a strong one. Rooted in shared support for civil and religious liberty, this connection culminated by the turn of the twentieth century in what became known as the Nonconformist conscience, a moral and political movement that sought to apply evangelical principles to public life.

=== Non Conformism ===
Puritanism played a central role in the development of English Nonconformism, as many Puritans rejected the Church of England’s hierarchical structure, ceremonial practices and other perceived remnants of Catholicism. Their emphasis on individual conscience, the authority of Scripture, and congregational autonomy led to the formation of independent religious groups outside the established church. Following the Restoration in 1660 and the Act of Uniformity 1662, many Puritan ministers refused to conform to the prescribed rites of the Church of England and were consequently expelled from their livings in what was known as the Great Ejection. These Dissenters or Nonconformists formed the basis of later British Congregationalist, Baptist, and Presbyterian traditions.

=== Religious toleration in New England ===
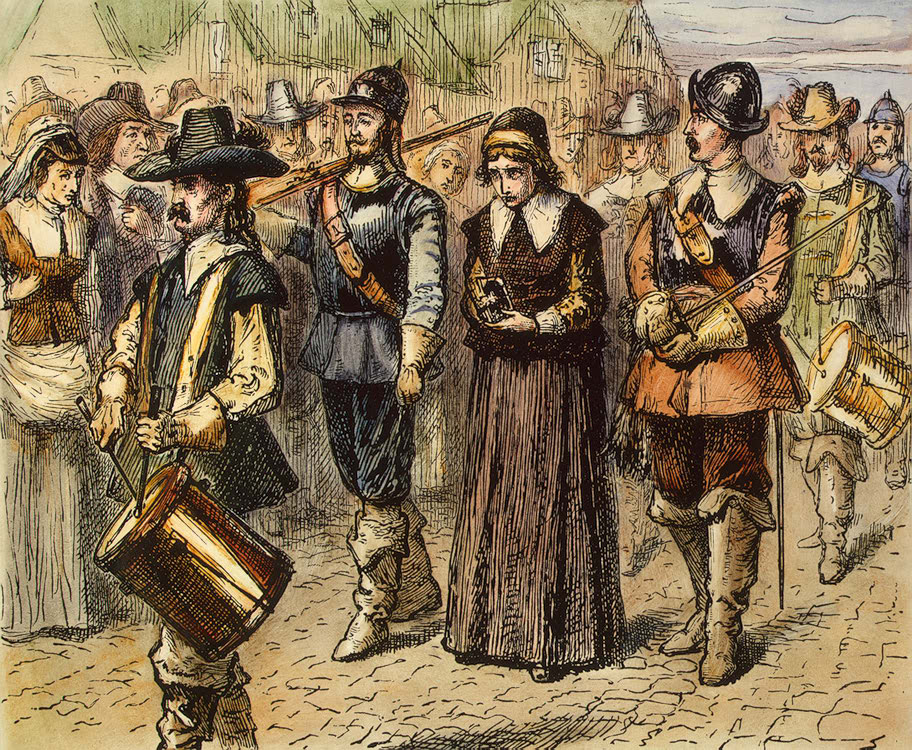
Quaker Mary Dyer led to execution on Boston Common, 1 June 1660, by an unknown 19th century artist

In New England, where Congregationalism was the official religion, the Puritans exhibited intolerance of other religious beliefs, including Quaker, Anglican, and Baptist theologies. The Puritans of the Massachusetts Bay Colony were the most active of the New England persecutors of Quakers, and the persecuting spirit was shared by the Plymouth Colony and the colonies along the Connecticut river.

Four Quakers, known as the Boston martyrs, were executed. The first two of the four Boston martyrs were executed by the Puritans on 27 October 1659, and in memory of this, 27 October is now International Religious Freedom Day, to recognise the importance of freedom of religion. In 1660, one of the most notable victims of the religious intolerance was the English Quaker Mary Dyer, who was hanged in Boston for repeatedly defying a Puritan law which banned Quakers from the colony. The hanging of Dyer on Boston Common marked the beginning of the end of the Puritan theocracy. In 1661, King Charles II explicitly forbade Massachusetts from executing anyone for professing Quakerism. In 1684, England revoked the Massachusetts charter, and in 1686, they sent over a royal governor to enforce English laws, and in 1689, they passed a broad Toleration Act.

Anti-Catholic sentiment appeared in New England with the first Pilgrim and Puritan settlers. In 1647, Massachusetts passed a law which prohibited any Jesuit Roman Catholic priests from entering territory that was under Puritan jurisdiction. Any suspected Catholic who could not clear himself was to be banished from the colony; a second offense carried a death penalty. A plaque in Southwick Hall at the University of Massachusetts Lowell commemorates "Royal Southwick, Lowell's anti-slavery Quaker senator and manufacturer and a descendant of Lawrence and Cassandra Southwick who were despoiled, imprisoned, starved, whipped, banished from Massachusetts Colony and persecuted to death in the year 1660 for being Quakers".

== Historiography ==
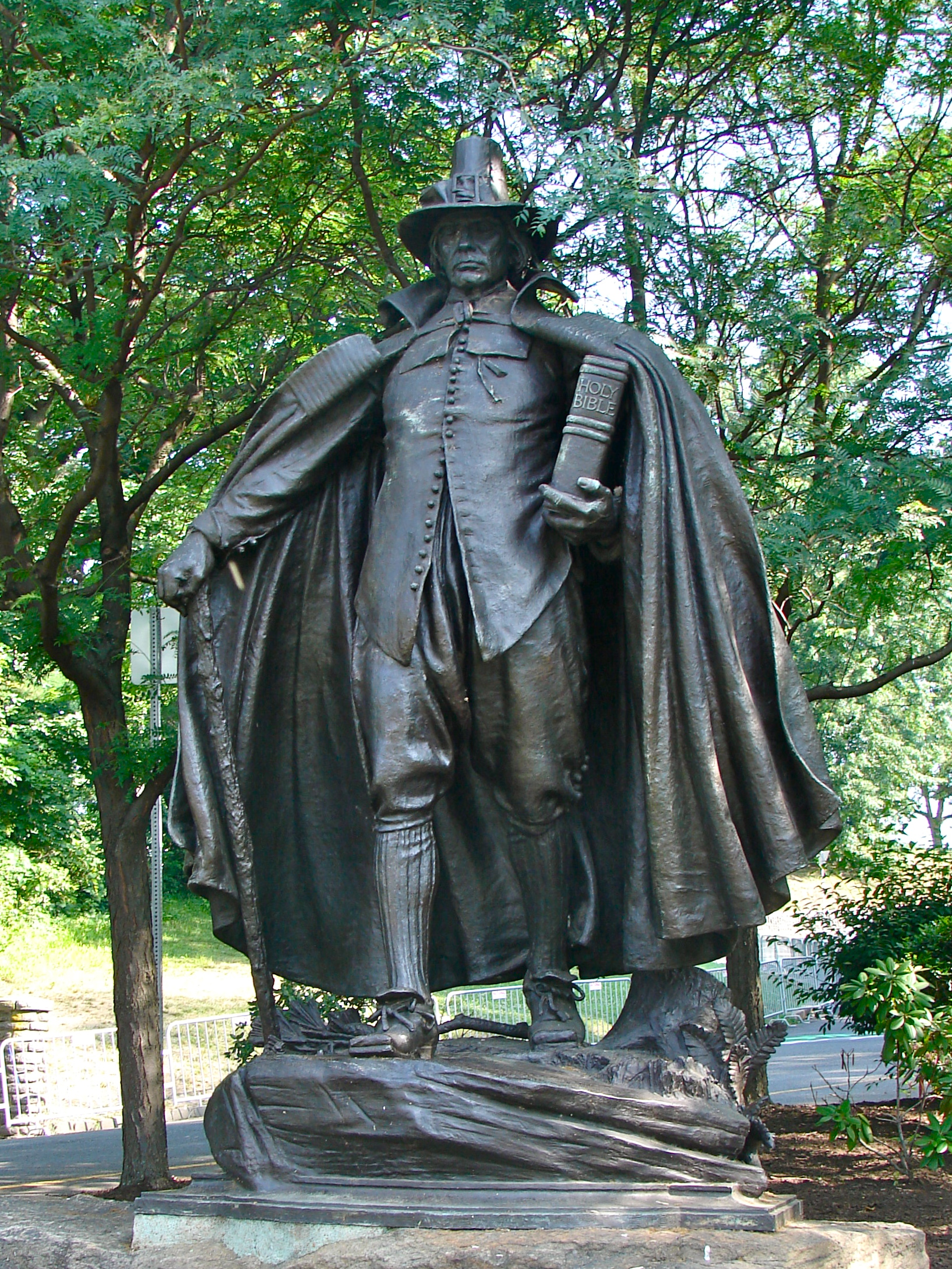
Second version of The Puritan, a late 19th-century sculpture by Augustus Saint-Gaudens

Puritanism has attracted much scholarly attention, and as a result, the secondary literature on the subject is vast. Puritanism is considered crucial to understanding the religious, political, and cultural issues of early modern England. In addition, historians such as Perry Miller have regarded Puritan New England as fundamental to understanding American culture and identity. Puritanism has also been credited with the creation of modernity itself, from England's Scientific Revolution to the rise of democracy. In the early 20th century, Max Weber argued in The Protestant Ethic and the Spirit of Capitalism that Calvinist self-denial resulted in a Protestant work ethic that nurtured the development of capitalism in Europe and North America. Puritan authors such as John Milton, John Bunyan, Anne Bradstreet, and Edward Taylor continue to be read and studied as important figures within English and American literature.

A debate continues on the definition of "Puritanism". The English historian Patrick Collinson argues that "There is little point in constructing elaborate statements defining what, in ontological terms, puritanism was and what it was not, when it was not a thing definable in itself but only one half of a stressful relationship." Puritanism "was only the mirror image of anti-puritanism and to a considerable extent its invention: a stigma, with great power to distract and distort historical memory." The historian John Spurr writes that Puritans were defined by their relationships with their surroundings, especially with the Church of England. Whenever the Church of England changed, Spurr argues, the definition of a Puritan also changed.

The analysis of "mainstream Puritanism", in terms of the evolution from it of Separatist and antinomian groups that did not flourish, and others that continue to this day, such as Baptists and Quakers, can suffer in this way. The national context (England and Wales, as well as the kingdoms of Scotland and Ireland) frames the definition of Puritans, but was not a self-identification for those Protestants who saw the progress of the Thirty Years' War from 1620 as directly bearing on their denomination, and as a continuation of the religious wars of the previous century, carried on by the English Civil Wars. The English historian Christopher Hill writes of the 1630s, old church lands, and the accusations that William Laud was a crypto-Catholic:

To the heightened Puritan imagination it seemed that, all over Europe, the lamps were going out: the Counter-Reformation was winning back property for the church as well as souls: and Charles I and his government, if not allied to the forces of the Counter-Reformation, at least appeared to have set themselves identical economic and political objectives.

== Notable Puritans ==
Oliver Cromwell, Lord Protector of the Commonwealth of England, Scotland, and Ireland

- John Brockett was a founder of New Haven, Connecticut.
- Peter Bulkley was an influential Puritan minister and founder of Concord.
- John Bunyan was famous for 1678 book The Pilgrim's Progress.
- William Bradford was Plymouth Colony's Governor.
- Anne Bradstreet was the first female to have her works published in the British North American colonies.
- Oliver Cromwell was an English military and political leader, and eventually became Lord Protector of the Commonwealth of England, Scotland, and Ireland. He was a very religious man, and was considered to be an independent Puritan.
- John Endecott was the first governor of the Massachusetts Bay Colony and an important military leader.
- Jonathan Edwards, evangelical preacher who sparked the First Great Awakening
- Thomas Hooker was a Puritan minister and co-founder of the Connecticut Colony.
- Cotton Mather was a prominent Puritan clergyman, theologian, and author in colonial America.
- Increase Mather was a Puritan minister and the father of Cotton Mather.
- Anne Hutchinson was a Puritan woman who was noted for speaking freely about her religious beliefs, which resulted in her banishment from Massachusetts Bay Colony.
- John Milton is regarded as among the greatest English poets; author of epics like Paradise Lost, and dramas like Samson Agonistes. He was a staunch supporter of Cromwell.
- James Noyes was an influential Puritan minister, teacher, and founder of Newbury.
- Philip Nye (minister) was the key adviser to Oliver Cromwell on matters of religion and regulation of the Church.
- Thomas Parker was an influential Puritan minister, teacher, and founder of Newbury.
- Samuel Parris was a Puritan minister who gained notoriety for being the minister of Salem Village during the Salem witch trials.
- John Winthrop is noted for his sermon "A Model of Christian Charity", and as a leading figure in founding the Massachusetts Bay Colony.
- Robert Woodford was an English lawyer, largely based at Northampton and London. His diary for the period 1637–1641 records in detail the outlook of an educated Puritan.

== See also ==
- Christianity in the 16th century
- Christianity in the 17th century
- Plymouth Rock
- Restorationism
- Work ethic

== Bibliography ==
- Ahlstrom, Sydney E. (2004) [1972]. A Religious History of the American People (2nd ed.). Yale University Press. ISBN 0-385-11164-9. Archived from the original on 4 April 2023 – via Google Books.
- Bailyn, Bernard (2017). The Ideological Origins of the American Revolution (Fiftieth Anniversary ed.). Cambridge, Massachusetts: Harvard University Press. ISBN 9780674975651.
- Barnett, James Harwood (1984). The American Christmas: A Study in National Culture. Ayer Publishing. ISBN 0-405-07671-1.
- Bebbington, David W. (1993). Evangelicalism in Modern Britain: A History from the 1730s to the 1980s. London: Routledge.
- Beeke, Joel R.; Jones, Mark (2012). A Puritan Theology: Doctrine for Life (Amazon Kindle ed.). Reformation Heritage Books. ISBN 978-1-60178-166-6.
- Benedetto, Robert; McKim, Donald K. (2010). Historical Dictionary of the Reformed Churches. Scarecrow Press. ISBN 978-0-8108-5807-7 – via Google Books.
- Bremer, Francis J., ed. (1981). Anne Hutchinson: Troubler of the Puritan Zion. R.E. Krieger Pub. Co. ISBN 978-0898740639.
- Bremer, Francis J.; Webster, Tom, eds. (2006). "Savoy Assembly". Puritans and Puritanism in Europe and America: A Comprehensive Encyclopedia. ABC-CLIO. pp. 533–534. ISBN 978-1576076781.
- Bremer, Francis J. (2009). Puritanism: A Very Short Introduction. Oxford University Press. ISBN 978-0199740871.
- Carpenter, John B. (Winter 2003). "New England's Puritan Century: Three Generations of Continuity in the City upon a Hill". Fides et Historia. 35 (1). The Conference on Faith and History: 41–58. Archived from the original on 9 August 2022.
- Cliffe, Trevor (2002). Puritan Gentry Besieged 1650–1700. Routledge. ISBN 978-1134918157.
- Coffey, John; Lim, Paul C. H., eds. (2008). The Cambridge Companion to Puritanism. Cambridge Companions to Religion. Cambridge University Press. ISBN 978-0-521-67800-1.
- Coffin, Charles (1987), The Story of Liberty: So You Will Comprehend What Liberty Has Cost, and What It Is Worth, Maranatha Publications, ISBN 093855820X
- Collinson, Patrick (1988). The Birthpangs of Protestant England: Religious and Cultural Change in the Sixteenth and Seventeenth Centuries. Palgrave Macmillan. ISBN 978-1-349-19586-2. Archived from the original on 4 April 2023.
- Craig, John (2008), "The Growth of English Puritanism", in Coffey, John; Lim, Paul C. H. (eds.), The Cambridge Companion to Puritanism, Cambridge Companions to Religion, Cambridge University Press, pp. 34–47, ISBN 978-0-521-67800-1
- Demos, John (1970). A Little Commonwealth; Family Life in Plymouth Colony. New York: Oxford University Press. ISBN 978-0-19-501355-9.
- Fischer, David Hackett (1989). Albion's Seed: Four British Folkways in America. Oxford University Press. ISBN 0-19-506905-6.
- Foster, Thomas (October 1999). "Deficient Husbands: Manhood, Sexual Incapacity, and Male Marital Sexuality in Seventeenth-Century New England". The William and Mary Quarterly. 56 (4): 723–744. doi:10.2307/2674233. JSTOR 2674233.
- Gay, Peter (1984). The Bourgeois Experience: The Tender Passion. W. W. Norton & Company. ISBN 978-0393319033. Archived from the original on 4 April 2023.
- Greaves, Richard L. (Winter 1985). "The Puritan–Nonconformist Tradition in England, 1560–1700: Historiographical Reflections". Albion: A Quarterly Journal Concerned with British Studies. 17 (4). The North American Conference on British Studies: 449–486. doi:10.2307/4049433. JSTOR 4049433.
- Harrison, Peter (2001). The Bible, Protestantism, and the Rise of Natural Science. Cambridge University Press. ISBN 978-0521000963. Archived from the original on 4 April 2023.
- Hill, Christopher (1972). The World Turned Upside Down: Radical Ideas During the English Revolution. Viking. ISBN 978-0670789757.
- Hotson, Howard (2000). Paradise Postponed: Johann Heinrich Alsted and the Birth of Calvinist Millenarianism. Springer Science and Business Media. ISBN 978-9401594943. Archived from the original on 4 April 2023.
- Johnson, James Turner (1970). A Society Ordained by God. Nashville: Abingdon Press. ISBN 978-0687389339.
- Keeble, N. H. (1987). The Literary Culture of Nonconformity in Later Seventeenth-Century England. University of Georgia Press. ISBN 978-0820309514.
- Kelly, Douglas F. (1992). The Emergence of Liberty in the Modern World: The Influence of Calvin on Five Governments from the 16th Through 18th Centuries. P&R.
- Lamont, William M. (1969). Godly Rule: Politics and Religion 1603–60. Macmillan. ISBN 978-0333100745.
- Leighton, Denys (2004). The Greenian Moment: T.H. Green, Religion and Political Argument in Victorian Britain. Imprint Academic. ISBN 978-0907845546. Archived from the original on 4 April 2023.
- Lewis, C. S. (1969). Selected Literary Essays. New York: Cambridge University Press. ISBN 0-521-07441-X.
- Maclear, J. F. (April 1975). "New England and the Fifth Monarchy: The Quest for the Millennium in Early American Puritanism". The William and Mary Quarterly. 32 (2). Omohundro Institute of Early American History and Culture: 223–260. doi:10.2307/1921563. JSTOR 1921563.
- Macleod, Donald (Autumn 2009). "The influence of Calvinism on politics" (PDF). Theology in Scotland. XVI (2).
- Miller, Perry; Johnson, Thomas H., eds. (2014). The Puritans: A Sourcebook of Their Writings. Courier Corporation.
- Miller, Randall M. (2008). The Greenwood Encyclopedia of Daily Life in America. ABC-CLIO. ISBN 978-0313065361.
- Milton, Michael A. (1997). The Application of the Faith of the Westminster Assembly in the Ministry of the Welsh Puritan, Vavasor Powell (1617–1670) (PhD). University of Wales.
- Norton, Mary Beth (2008). People and a Nation: A History of the United States, Volume 1: To 1877, Brief Edition. Cengage Learning.
- Norton, Mary Beth (2011). Separated by Their Sex: Women in Public and Private in the Colonial Atlantic World. Ithaca: Cornell University Press.
- Nuttall, Geoffrey F. (1992). The Holy Spirit in Puritan Faith and Experience. University of Chicago Press. p. 9. ISBN 978-0-226-60941-6.
- Porterfield, Amanda (1992). Female Piety in Puritan New England the Emergence of Religious Humanism. New York: Oxford University Press.
- Ross, Richard J. (2007), Puritan Godly Discipline in Comparative Perspective: Legal Pluralism and the Sources of "Intensity"
- Saxton, Martha (2003). Being Good: Women's Moral Values in Early America. New York: Hill and Wang. ISBN 978-0374110116.
- Spencer, Ivor Debenham (December 1935). "Christmas, the Upstart". The New England Quarterly. 8 (4). The New England Quarterly, Inc.: 498–517. doi:10.2307/360356. JSTOR 360356.
- Spraggon, Julie (2003). Puritan Iconoclasm During the English Civil War. Studies in Modern British Religious History. Vol. 6. Boydell Press. ISBN 978-0851158952. Archived from the original on 4 April 2023.
- Spurr, John (1998). English Puritanism, 1603–1689. Social History in Perspective. Palgrave MacMillan. ISBN 978-0-333-60189-1.
- Ulrich, Laurel Thatcher (1976). "Vertuous Women Found: New England Ministerial Literature, 1668–1735" (PDF). American Quarterly. 28 (1): 20–40. doi:10.2307/2712475. JSTOR 2712475. S2CID 144156297. Archived (PDF) from the original on 4 November 2018.
- Watras, Joseph (2008). "Education and Evangelism in the English Colonies". American Educational History Journal. 35 (1): 205–219. ISSN 1535-0584.
- West, Jim (2003). Drinking with Calvin and Luther!. Oakdown Books. ISBN 0-9700326-0-9.
- White, James F. (1999). The Sacraments in Protestant Practice and Faith. Abingdon Press. ISBN 0-687-03402-7.
