= Thomas Ball =

Thomas or Tom Ball may refer to:

- Thomas Ball (priest, born 1590) (1590–1659), English divine
- Thomas Ball (archdeacon of Chichester) (1697–1770), Church of England clergyman
- Thomas Ball (New Zealand politician) (1809–1897), represented the Mongonui electorate
- Thomas Ball (artist) (1819–1911), American sculptor
- Thomas H. Ball (1859–1944), American politician and U.S. representative from Texas
- Thomas Ball (New Zealand cricketer) (1865–1953), New Zealand cricketer
- Tom Ball (golfer) (1882–1919), English golfer
- Thomas R. Ball (1896–1943), American politician and U.S. representative from Connecticut
- Tommy Ball (1900–1923), English footballer
- Thomas Ball (provost of Cumbrae) (died 1916), Scottish priest
- Tom Ball (cricketer) (1921–2002), Australian cricketer
- Thomas Ball (South African cricketer) (born 1951), South African cricketer
- Thomas Ball (computer scientist) (born 1965), see SLAM project
- Thomas Ball (activist) (1953–2011), American father's rights advocate and self-immolator
- Tom Ball (singer) (born 1998), English singer
