= John Yates =

John Yates may refer to:

- Jack Yates (footballer, born 1860) (1860–?), English footballer with Stoke
- Jack Yates (footballer, born 1861) (1861–1917), England and Burnley footballer
- Jack Yates (John Henry Yates, 1828–1897), African American slave and later minister in Houston, Texas
- John B. Yates (1784–1836), American politician from New York
- John Melvin Yates (born 1939), American diplomat
- John P. Yates (1921–2017), American politician
- John R. Yates, American scientist specializing in proteomics
- John Yates (bishop) (1925–2008), former bishop of Gloucester
- John Yates (chemist) (1935–2015), American chemist
- John Yates (divine) (fl. 1612–1660), Anglican cleric
- John Yates (footballer, born 1929) (1929–2020), English footballer with Chester City
- John Yates (minister) (1755–1826), English Unitarian in Liverpool
- John Yates (police officer) (born 1959), former British police officer
- John Yates (rugby league), New Zealand rugby league international
- John Ashton Yates (1781–1863), member of parliament for County Carlow, Ireland
- John Van Ness Yates (1779–1839), New York lawyer, politician, and secretary of state

== See also ==
- John Butler Yeats (pronounced Yates, 1839–1922), Irish artist
