= John Preston (priest) =

Anglican minister (1587–1628)

John Preston (1587–1628) was an Anglican minister and master of Emmanuel College, Cambridge.

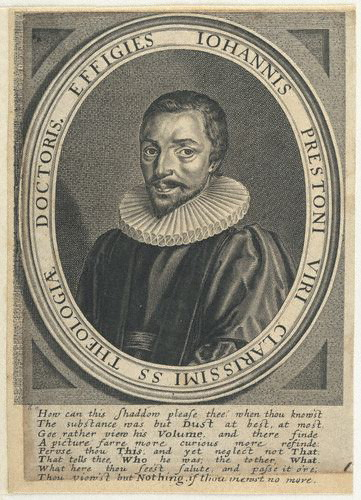
John Preston, 1629 engraving

== Upbringing ==
John Preston, the son of Thomas Preston, a farmer, and his wife Alice, daughter of Lawrence Marsh of Northampton, was born at Upper Heyford in the parish of Bugbrook, Northamptonshire. He was baptised at Bugbrook church on 27 October 1587. His father died when he was 13 years old, and his mother's maternal uncle, Creswell, who was mayor of Northampton and rich and childless, adopted Preston, placing him at the Northampton Grammar School, and subsequently with a Bedfordshire clergyman named Guest for instruction in Greek. He matriculated as a sizar at King's College, Cambridge, on 5 July 1604, his tutor being Busse, who became master of Eton in 1606. King's College was then famous for the study of music; Preston chose 'the noblest but hardest instrument, the lute', but made little progress. In 1606 he migrated to Queens' College, where he had as tutor Oliver Bowles, B.D. Creswell had left him the reversion of some landed property, and he thought of a diplomatic career. With this view he entered into treaty with a merchant, who arranged for his spending some time in Paris, but on this merchant's death the arrangement fell through. Preston then turned to the study of philosophy, in which he was encouraged by Porter, who succeeded Bowles as his tutor. By Porter's interest with Humphrey Tyndall, master of Queens' and dean of Ely, Preston, who had graduated B.A. in 1607, was chosen fellow in 1609. From philosophy he now turned to medicine; got some practical knowledge under the roof of a friend, a physician in Kent, 'very famous for his practice'; and studied astrology, then valued as a handmaid to therapeutics.

== Career as a preacher ==
About 1611, the year in which he commenced MA, he heard a sermon at St Mary's from John Cotton, then fellow of Emmanuel, which opened to him a new career. Cotton had a great reputation as an elegant preacher; but this was a plain evangelical sermon, and disappointed his audience. He returned to his rooms, somewhat mortified by his reception, when Preston knocked at his door, and that close religious friendship began which permanently influenced the lives of both. Preston now gave himself to the study of scholastic divinity; Aquinas seems to have been his favourite; he thoroughly mastered also Duns Scotus and William of Ockham.

His biographer tells a curious story of his activity in securing the election (1614) of John Davenant as master of Queens' in succession to Tyndal. George Montaigne, afterwards Archbishop of York, had his eye on this preferment; but immediately on Tyndal's death Preston rode post-haste to London, reaching Whitehall before day-break. Here he made interest with Robert Carr, 1st Earl of Somerset, with a view to secure court sanction for the choice of Davenant. Returning to Cambridge, he had the election over before Montaigne got wind of the vacancy.

During the visit of James I to Cambridge in March 1615, Preston distinguished himself as a disputant. He was chosen by Samuel Harsnett, the vice-chancellor, as 'answerer' in the philosophy act, but this place was successfully claimed by Matthew Wren, and Preston took the post of first opponent. His biographer, Thomas Ball, gives an account of the disputation on the question 'Whether dogs could make syllogismes'. Preston maintained that they could. James was delighted with his argument (which Granger thinks Preston borrowed from a well-known passage in Montaigne's Essays), and introduced a dog story of his own. 'It was easy to discerne that ye kings hound had opened a way for Mr. Preston at ye court'. Sir Fulke Greville, 1st Baron Brooke, became his firm friend (he ultimately settled £50 a year upon him). But Preston had by this time given up his early ambition; though he said little of his purpose, his mind was set on the ministry, and he was reading modern divinity, especially Calvin.

== Puritan leanings ==
His coolness in the direction of court favour gave rise to suspicions of his puritan leaning. These were increased by an incident of James's second visit to Cambridge. A comedy called Ignoramus, by George Ruggle of Clare Hall, was to be acted before the king. Preston's pupil Morgan (of the Morgans of Heyford) was cast for a woman's part. Preston objected; the lad's guardians over-ruled the objection; Morgan, who was removed to Oxford, subsequently joined the Roman Catholic Church. His strictness greatly increased his reputation as a tutor with puritan parents; 'he was,' says Fuller, 'the greatest pulpit-monger in England in man's memory. ... every time, when Master Preston plucked off his hat to Doctor Davenant, the college master, he gained a chamber or study for one of his pupils'.

The college buildings were enlarged to provide for the influx of students. He was in the habit of sending those designed for the church to finish their studies with Cotton, now vicar of Boston, Lincolnshire. Meanwhile, Preston's health was suffering, and he was troubled with insomnia. Twice he applied for advice (once in disguise) to William Butler of Clare Hall, a successful empiric. Butler only told him to take tobacco; on doing so he found his remedy in 'this hot copious fume.'

== Holy orders ==
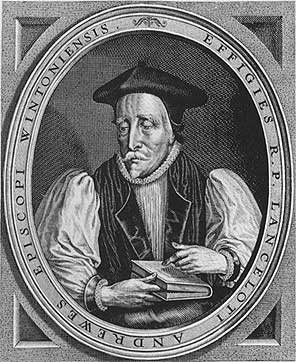
Lancelot Andrewes directed Preston to declare his judgment regarding forms of prayer in a sermon at St Botolph's.

Preston had now taken orders, and become dean and catechist of Queens'. He began a course of sermons which were to form a body of divinity. Complaints were made to the vice-chancellor that the college chapel was crowded with scholars from other colleges and townsmen. Order was issued excluding all but members of the college. Preston then began an afternoon lecture at St. Botolph's, of which Queens' College is patron. This brought him into conflict with Newcome, commissary to the chancellor of Ely, whose enmity Preston had earned by preventing a match between his pupil, Sir Capel Bedels, and Newcome's daughter Jane. A dispute with Newcome at St. Botolph's delayed the afternoon service; to make room for the sermon, common prayer was for once omitted. Newcome sped to the court at Newmarket to denounce Preston as a nonconformist.

The matter came before the heads of houses, and there was talk of Preston's expulsion from the university. At the suggestion of Lancelot Andrewes, then Bishop of Ely, Preston was directed to declare his judgment regarding forms of prayer in a sermon at St. Botolph's. He acquitted himself so as to silence complaint. Soon afterwards he was summoned to preach before the king at Finchingbrook, near Royston, Cambridgeshire. James highly approved his argument against the Arminians; he would have shown him less favour had he known that Preston was the author of a paper against the Spanish match, circulated with much secrecy among members of the House of Lords. He was proposed as a royal chaplain by James Hamilton, 2nd Duke of Abercorn, but James thought this premature.

== Chaplain-in-ordinary ==
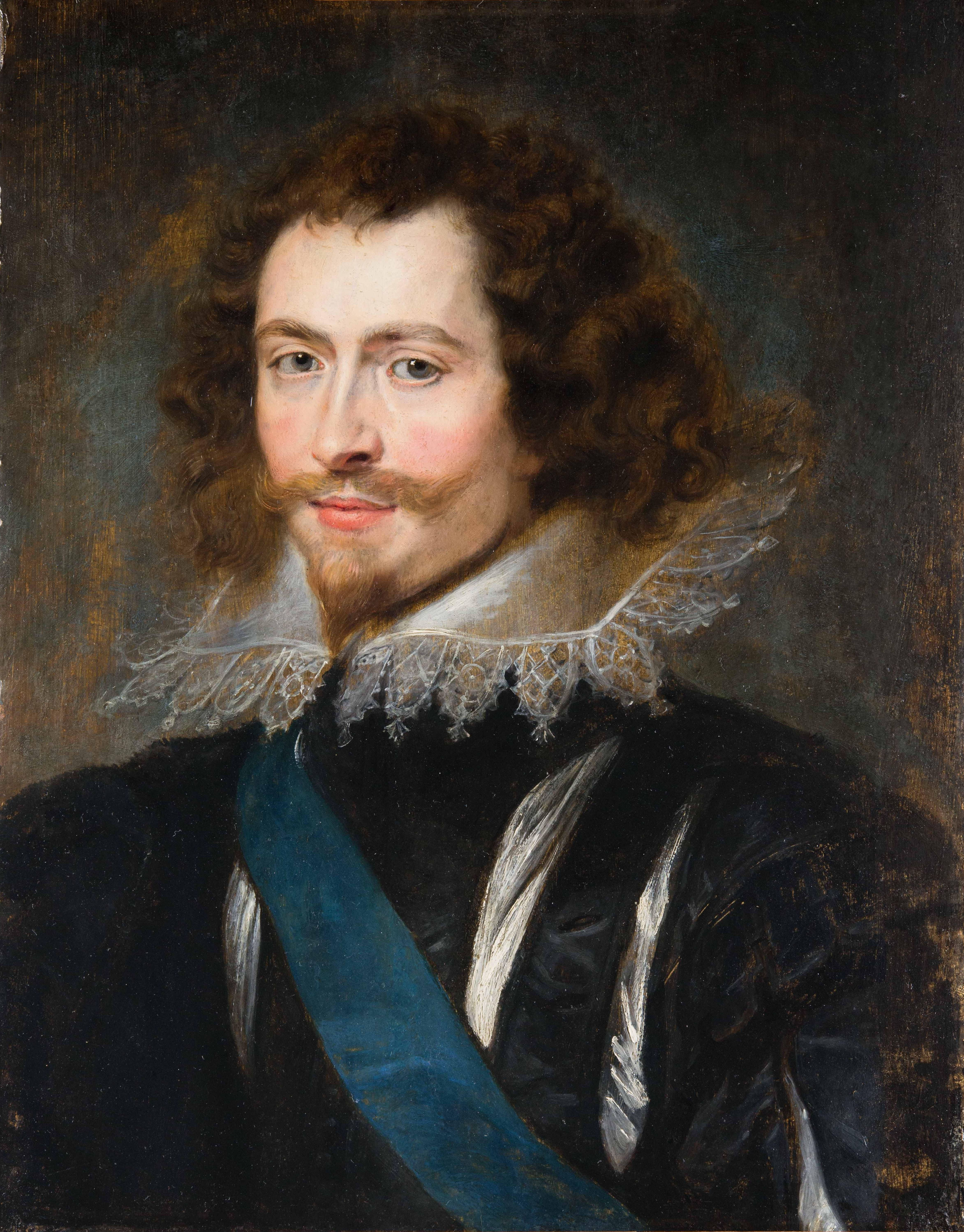
The Duke of Buckingham was a relation.

Preston's kinsman, Sir Ralph Freeman, who had married a relative of George Villiers, 1st Duke of Buckingham, now took occasion to represent to Buckingham that he might make friends of the puritans by promoting Preston. Through Buckingham's interest he was made chaplain-in-ordinary to Prince Charles. He took the degree of Bachelor of Divinity in 1620. On Davenant's election (11 June 1621) to the see of Salisbury, Preston had some expectation of succeeding him as Margaret professor of divinity. He felt his Latin to be rusty, and, as an exercise in speaking Latin, he resolved on a visit to the Dutch universities, a project which he carried out with a singular excess of precaution.

From the privy council he obtained the necessary licence for travel. He gave out that he was going, the next vacation, to visit Sir Richard Sandys in Kent, and possibly to drink the Tunbridge waters. From the Kentish coast he took boat for Rotterdam, in a lay habit with 'scarlet cloake' and 'gold hat band'. In Holland he consorted with Roman Catholics as well as Protestants. On his return to Cambridge he met the rumour of his having been beyond the seas with a wonder 'at their silliness, that they would believe so unlikely a relation'. After all he had been outwitted, for Williams, the lord keeper, suspecting some puritan plot, had set a spy on his movements, who sent weekly intelligence of his doings.

== Master of Emmanuel ==
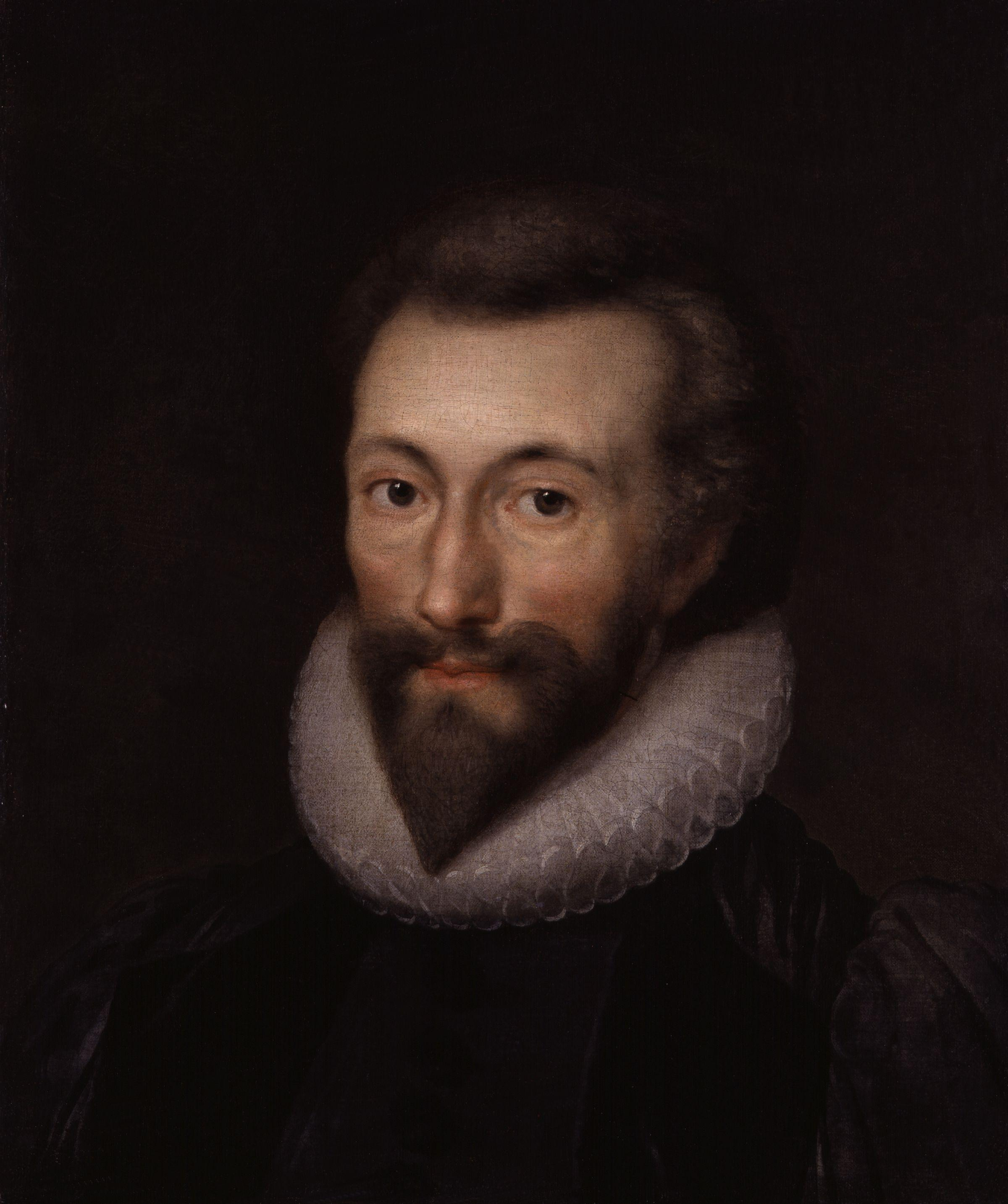
John Donne was followed by Preston at Lincoln's Inn.

In February 1622 John Donne resigned the preachership at Lincoln's Inn, and the benchers elected Preston as his successor. A new chapel, finished soon after his appointment, gave accommodation to the large numbers who flocked to hear him. A more important piece of preferment followed, but it was not obtained without intrigue. Laurence Chaderton, the first master of Emmanuel, had held that post with distinction for thirty-eight years. He had outlived his influential friends, and the fellows thought that to secure Preston's interest with Buckingham would be to the advantage of their college. In particular they wanted a modification of the statutes, which enjoined continuous residence, so cutting them off from chaplaincies and lectureships, and at the same time compelled them to vacate at the standing of DD, whether otherwise provided or not. From Preston's influence they hoped to gain more liberty, as well as to increase the number of college livings. Chaderton thought highly of Preston, but was very reluctant to resign, and doubted whether, if he did, an Arminian might not be appointed. Preston procured a letter from Buckingham (20 September 1622) assuring Chaderton that it was the wish of the king and the prince that he should make way for Preston, and promising him a 'supply of maintenance'. Accordingly, Chaderton resigned on 25 September; contrary to statute, the vacancy was not announced, on the plea that all the fellows were in residence; the election took place on 2 October with locked gates, and nothing was known of it at Queens' until Preston was sent for to be admitted as master of Emmanuel.

The statutes limited the master's absence to a month in every quarter. This would interfere with Preston's preaching at Lincoln's Inn. His ingenuity found out evasions to which the fellows consented; the statutes condoned absence in case of 'violent detention ' and of 'college business'; a 'moral violence ' was held to satisfy the former condition, and a suit at law about a college living, which lasted some years, formed a colourable pretext for alleging college business. But Preston was inflexible on the point of vacating fellowships. According to Ball, he had been selected by Buckingham to accompany Arthur Chichester, 1st Baron Chichester, on a projected embassy to Germany, and was, on this occasion, was made a doctor of divinity by royal mandate. There is probably some confusion here: Chichester's actual expedition to the palatinate was in May–September 1622.

== Cambridge again ==
Preston was anxious for opportunities of preaching at Cambridge, and listened to proposals in 1624 for putting him into a vacant lectureship at Holy Trinity Church, Cambridge. The other candidate, Middlethwait, fellow of Sidney Sussex, was favoured by Nicholas Felton, Bishop of Ely. The matter was referred to James I, who wanted to keep Preston out of a Cambridge pulpit, and, through Edward Conway (afterwards Viscount Conway), offered him any other preferment at his choice. It was then that Buckingham told Preston he might have the bishopric of Gloucester, vacant by the death of Miles Smith (d. 20 October 1624). But Preston, backed by the townsmen, maintained his ground and got the lectureship.

== Death of James I ==
He was in attendance as Charles's chaplain at Theobalds on Sunday, 27 March 1625, when James I died, and accompanied Charles and Buckingham to Whitehall, where the public proclamation of Charles's accession was made. For the moment it seemed as if Preston was destined to play an important part in politics. He exerted influence on behalf of his puritan friends, obtaining a general preaching license (20 June 1625) for Arthur Hildersam. But he found his plans counteracted by William Laud. On the plea of a danger of the plague, he closed his college and took a journey into the west. He wanted to consult Davenant at Salisbury about the 'Appello Csesarem' of Richard Montagu, on which Buckingham had asked his judgment. From Salisbury he went on to Dorchester, and thence to Plymouth, where Charles and Buckingham were.

When the news reached Plymouth of the disaster at Rochelle (on the 15/16 Sep 1625, when the French under Soubise defeated hired Dutch ships near Rochelle), Preston did his best to excuse and defend Buckingham against the outburst of Protestant indignation. On the removal of Williams from the lord-keepership (30 October 1625), Buckingham 'went so farr as to nominate' Preston to be lord keeper. Thomas Coventry, 1st Baron Coventry, who had been counsel for Emmanuel College in the suit above mentioned, was eventually appointed.

Preston, however, could not draw the puritans to the side of Buckingham, whom they profoundly distrusted. Preston's friends urged the necessity of a conference on Montagu's books, and nominated on the one side John Buckeridge, Bishop of Rochester, and Francis White, then dean of Carlisle; on the other, Thomas Morton, then Bishop of Coventry and Lichfield, and Preston. Buckingham played a double part, begging Preston as his friend to decline the conference, and letting others know that he had done with Preston. The conference was held in February 1626 at York House. Preston refused to take part, but came in after it was begun and sat by as a hearer. A second conference followed in the same month, at which Preston took the lead against Montagu and White. When Preston realised that the York House Conference was not likely to favour Puritanism, he encouraged a group of Puritan lawyers, merchants, and clergymen (including Richard Sibbes and John Davenport) to establish an organization known as the Feoffees for the Purchase of Impropriations.

Buckingham was elected chancellor of Cambridge University on 1 June 1626. Preston did not oppose his election, as Joseph Mead and others did: but he now felt his position in the university insecure, looked to Lincoln's Inn as a refuge in case he were ousted from Cambridge, and as a last resort contemplated a migration to Basle. A private letter to a member of parliament, in which Preston suggested a line of opposition to Buckingham, came by an accident into Buckingham's hands. Seeing that Preston's influence at court was waning, the fellows of Emmanuel petitioned the king to annul the statute limiting the tenure of their fellowships. Buckingham supported their plea. Preston had the support of Sir Henry Mildmay, the founder's grandson. At length a compromise was reached. Charles suspended the statute (5 May 1627) till such time as six new livings of £100 a year should be annexed to the college. Buckingham was now engaged with his ill-fated expedition (27 June 1627) to the Isle of Ré. In November Preston preached before Charles at Whitehall a sermon which was regarded as prophetic when, on the following Wednesday, news arrived of Buckingham's defeat (8 November) He was not allowed to preach again, but considered that he had obtained a moral victory for his cause.

== Death of Preston ==
However, Preston's health was now breaking; his lungs were diseased, he fell into a rapid decline, and died at a friend's house at Preston-Capes, Northamptonshire, on Sunday, 20 July 1628; When he lay dying, they asked him if he feared death, now that it was so close. "No," whispered Preston; "I shall change my place, but I shall not change my company." "I feel death coming into my heart; my pain shall now be turned into joy"

He was buried on 28 July in Fawsley church, John Dod, rector of the neighbouring parish of Fawsley, preaching the funeral sermon. There is no monument to his memory. A fine engraved portrait of him is prefixed to his New Covenant, 1629; it is poorly reproduced in Clarke; there are also two smaller engravings. As Ball describes him, 'he was of an able, firme, well-tempered constitution, comely visage, vigorous and vived eye'. He was unmarried. His will provided for his mother and brothers, founded exhibitions at Emmanuel College, and left his books and furniture to Thomas Ball, his favourite pupil and his minute biographer.

== Character of Preston ==
Preston's early inclination for diplomacy was symptomatic of his character, which Fuller has summed as that of 'a perfect politician' apt 'to flutter most on that place which was furthest from his eggs'. He had 'great self-command, kept his own counsel, and was impervious to outside criticism'. Only to Ball does he seem to have frankly bared his mind, and Ball's admiring delineation of him furnishes a singular picture of cautious astuteness and constitutional reserve. It is clear that his heart was firmly set on the propagation of the Calvinistic theology; his posthumous works (edited by Richard Sibbes, John Davenport, Thomas Ball, and partly by Thomas Goodwin, D.D.) are a storehouse of argument in its favour.

== Publications ==
1. The Saints Daily Exercise; or a ... Treatise of Prayer, 3rd edit. 1629
2. The New Covenant ... XIV Sermons on Genesis xvii. 1, 2, 1629
3. Four Sermons, 1630
4. Five Sermons ... before his Majestie, 1630
5. The Breastplate of Faith and Love, 1630
6. The Doctrine of the Saints Infirmities, Amsterdam 1630
7. Life Eternal; or a ... Treatise ... of the Divine ... Attributes in XVII Sermons, 1631
8. The Law Out Lawed, Edinburgh, 1631
9. An Elegant ... Description of Spirituall Life and Death, 1632
10. The Deformed Forme of a Formall Profession, Edinburgh, 1632; London, 1641
11. Sinnes Overthrow; or a ... Treatise of Mortification, 2nd edit. 1633
12. Foure ... Treatises, 1633, including:

1. A Remedy against Covetousness
2. An elegant and Lively Description of Spiritual Life and Death
3. The Doctrine of Selfe-deniall
4. Three Sermons upon the Sacrament

13. The Saints Qualification, 3rd edit. 1634
14. A Liveles Life; or Man's Spirituall Death 3rd edit. 1635
15. A Sermon preached at Lincolnes-Inne, 1635
16. Remaines of ... John Preston, 2nd edit. 1637
17. The Golden Scepter ... Three Treatises, 1638
18. Mount Ebal ... Treatise of the Divine Love, 1638
19. The Saints Submission, 1638
20. The Fulnesse of Christ, 1640
21. The Christian Freedome, 1641
22. De Irresistibilitate Gratise Convertentis. Thesis habita in Scholis Publicis Academies Cantabrigiensis . . . Ex ipsius manuscript, 1643 (in English, The Position of John Preston ... Concerning the Irresistiblenesse of Converting Grace, 1654)
23. Riches of Mercy, 1658

== Bibliography ==
- Jonathan D. Moore, English Hypothetical Universalism: John Preston and the Softening of Reformed Theology (Grand Rapids, MI, William B. Eerdmans, 2007).
- This article incorporates text from a publication now in the public domain: "Preston, John (1587-1628)". Dictionary of National Biography. London: Smith, Elder & Co. 1885–1900.

Academic offices
Preceded by Laurence Chaderton	Master of Emmanuel College, Cambridge; 1622–1628	Succeeded by William Sancroft the Elder
