= John Fairclough (disambiguation) =

John Fairclough was a computer designer.

John Fairclough may also refer to:

- John Fairclough (MP) for Derby (UK Parliament constituency)
- chorister, divine and chaplain sometimes known as John Fairclough John Featley
