= John White (chaplain) =

English clergyman

John White (1570–1615) was an English clergyman, known as a royal chaplain and controversialist.

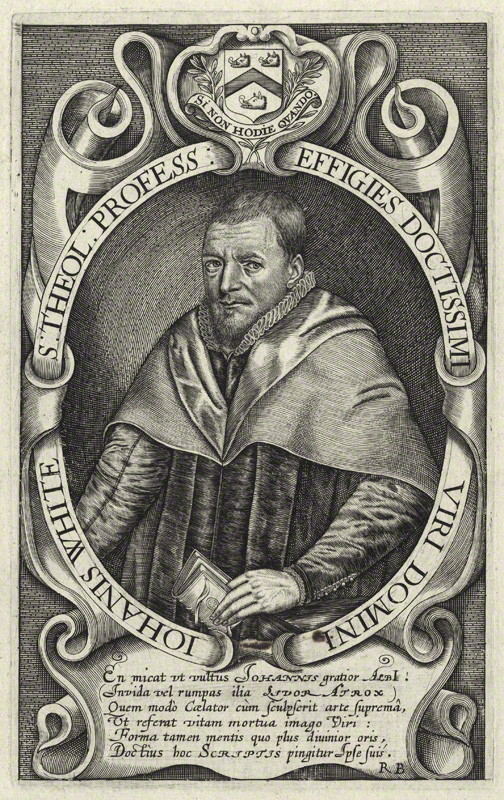
John White

== Life ==
The son of Peter White, vicar of St. Neots, Huntingdonshire, and of the neighbouring parish of Eaton Socon in Bedfordshire, he was born at Eaton Socon; Francis White was his brother. White was educated at St. Neots grammar school. He was admitted a sizar of Gonville and Caius College, Cambridge, on 15 February 1586, was scholar from Lady-day 1588 to Michaelmas 1592, and graduated B.A. in 1590, M.A. in 1593, and D.D. in 1612.

White was appointed vicar of Leyland, then of Eccles, Lancashire, and fellow of the Collegiate Church, Manchester, in 1606. He resigned these offices in 1609 on being presented by Sir John Crofts to the rectory of Barsham in Suffolk. In 1614 or 1615 he was made chaplain in ordinary to James I.

White died at the age of 45, in 1615, in Lombard Street, London. He was buried on 28 May 1615 at the church of St Mary Woolnoth. He left seven children. The eldest, John, entered Gonville and Caius College in 1611, aged 16, and became vicar of Eaton Socon; another son is mentioned by Thomas Fuller as a druggist in Lombard Street.

== Works ==
White wrote The Way to the True Church: wherein the principal Motives perswading to Romanisme are familiarly disputed and driven to their Issues, London, 1608. It was directed against the Treatise of Faith of the Jesuit John Percy. which was then being circulated in manuscript. The work set off a controversy, and further editions of this defence of Reformed theology came out in 1610, 1612, and 1616. Anthony Wotton also attacked Percy's work, and in so doing in A Trial of the Romish Clergies Title to the Church (1608) invoked Antichrist against the Catholic Church.

The Way to the True Church was answered by Percy (known as A. D. or Fisher) in A Reply Made unto Mr. Anthony Wotton and Mr. John White (1612). White rejoined for his part in A Defence of the Way to the True Church against A.D. his Reply, 1614. White's Defence then occasioned A Discovery of certain notorious Shifts, Evasions, and Untruths uttered by M. J. White … By W. G., London, 1619, and written by William Wright; White's original work evoked Thomas Worthington's Whyte dyed Black, or a Discovery of many most Foule Blemishes, Impostures and Deceipts which D. Whyte hath practysed in his Book, 1615. A reply to Worthington was published after White's death, in 1617, by his brother Francis White. A third reply to White's original book was A Treatise of the Church, in which it is proved Mr. J. W. his Way to the True Church to be indeed no Way at all to any Church, 1616. This work was also by Wright, who turned to translations from Leonard Lessius to dispute the possibility of salvation outside the Catholic church.

The Way to the True Church also contains examples gathered by White in his time at Eccles, of folkways and what he considered superstitious belief. He attributed these in part to the continuing influence of Catholic priests, on what remained a largely Catholic local congregation.

John White also published:

- English Paradise, discovered in a Latine Prospect of Jacobs Blessing, a Sermon on Gen. xxvii. 27, London, 1612.
- Two Sermons: the Former at Pauls Crosse on 1 Tim. ii. 1, upon the Anniversary Commemoration of the Kings most happy Succession to the Crowne of England; the Latter at the Spittle on 1 Tim. vi. 17, London, 1615.

His works were collected and republished by his brother Francis in 1624 in one volume folio.

== Notes ==
Attribution

This article incorporates text from a publication now in the public domain: Lee, Sidney, ed. (1900). "White, John (1570-1615)". Dictionary of National Biography. Vol. 61. London: Smith, Elder & Co.
