= George Walker (Puritan) =

English clergyman

George Walker (c.1581–1651) was an English clergyman, known for his strong Puritan views. He was imprisoned in 1638 by William Laud, Archbishop of Canterbury, an affair that was later raised against Laud at his trial. He became a member of the Westminster Assembly in 1643.

Anthony à Wood called Walker a "severe partisan", while Thomas Fuller said he was "a man of an holy life, humble heart, and bountiful hand."

== Life ==
He was born about 1581 at Hawkshead in Furness, Lancashire, and was educated at the Hawkshead Grammar School, founded by his kinsman, Archbishop Edwin Sandys. He was a near relative of John Walker. He went to St. John's College, Cambridge, where he graduated B.A. in 1608 and M.A. in 1611. His former tutor, Christopher Foster, who held the rectory of St. John Evangelist, Watling Street, the smallest parish in London, resigned that benefice in favour of Walker, who was inducted on 29 April 1614. There he continued all his life, refusing preferment.

In 1614 he accused Anthony Wotton of Socinian heresy and blasphemy. This led to a "conference before eight learned divines", which ended in a vindication of Wotton. On 2 March 1619 he was appointed chaplain to Nicholas Felton, Bishop of Ely. He was already respected as a logician, Hebraist, and theologian, and engaged in disputes with "heretics" and "papists". On 10 July 1621 he was incorporated B.D. of Oxford.

On 31 May 1623 he had a disputation on the authority of the church with Sylvester Norris, who called himself Smith. About the same time Walker was associated with Daniel Featley in a disputation with Father John Fisher. His puritanism was displeasing to Laud, who in 1636 mentions him in his yearly report to Charles I as one "who had all his time been but a disorderly and peevish man, and now of late hath very frowardly preached against the Lord Bishop of Ely his book concerning the Lord's Day, set out by authority; but upon a canonical admonition given him to desist he hath recollected himself, and I hope will be advised". In 1638 appeared his Doctrine of the Sabbath, which bears the imprint of Amsterdam, and contains extreme views of the sanctity of the Lord's day.

Walker was committed to prison on 11 November 1638 for some "things tending to faction and disobedience to authority" found in a sermon delivered by him on the 4th of the same month. His case was introduced into the House of Commons on 20 May 1641, and his imprisonment declared illegal. He was afterwards restored to his parsonage, and received compensation for his losses. At the trial of Laud in 1643 the imprisonment of Walker was made one of the charges against the archbishop. When he was free again he became very busy as a preacher and author. Four of his works are dated 1641: 1. God made visible in His Works, or a Treatise on the Eternal Works of God. 2. A Disputation between Master Walker and a Jesuite in the House of one Thomas Bates, in Bishop's Court in the Old Bailey, concerning the Ecclesiastical Function. 3. The Key of Saving Knowledge. 4. Socinianisme in the Fundamentall Point of Justification discovered and confuted. In the last of these, which was directed against John Goodwin, he revived imputations against Wotton, who found a vindicator in Thomas Gataker; in the following year Walker replied. Goodwin in his Treatise on Justification, 1642, deals with the various doctrinal points raised by Walker.

Walker joined the Westminster Assembly of divines in 1643, of which he was an active and influential member. On 29 January 1645 he preached a fast-day sermon before the House of Commons, which was shortly afterwards published, with an Epistle giving some details of his imprisonment. In the same year (1646) he printed A Brotherly and Friendly Censure of the Errour of a Dead Friend and Brother in Christian Affection. This refers to some remarks of William Prynne. On 26 September 1645 parliament appointed him a "trier" of elders in the London classis.

There is an undated tract by him about providing preachers in Lancashire. He himself supported the minister of Hawkshead. He was also a benefactor to Sion College library.

He died in his seventieth year in 1651, and was buried in his church in Watling Street, which was destroyed in the Great Fire of London of 1666.
