= Richard Montagu =

English cleric and prelate (1577–1641)

Richard Montagu (or Mountague) (1577 – 13 April 1641) was an English cleric and prelate.

== Early life ==
Montagu was born during Christmastide 1577 at Dorney, Buckinghamshire, where his father Laurence Mountague was vicar, and was educated at Eton. He was elected from Eton to a scholarship at King's College, Cambridge, and admitted on 24 August 1594. His name occurs in the list of junior fellows for the quarter Midsummer to Michaelmas 1597. He graduated BA before Lady Day 1598, MA 1602, BD 1609. He assisted Sir Henry Savile in the literary work he carried on at Eton, and the second book issued from the Eton press was his edition of The two Invectives of Gregory Nazianzen against Julian, 1610. He was also to have edited Basil the Great, but the work was never completed.

In 1610, he received the living of Wootton Courtney, Somerset; on 29 April 1613, he was admitted Fellow of Eton and in the same year received the rectory of Stanford Rivers, Essex. On 9 December 1616 he was installed Dean of Hereford, a post which he exchanged with Oliver Lloyd for a canonry of Windsor, in which he was installed on 6 September 1617. He was admitted Archdeacon of Hereford on 15 September 1617. He held also the rectory of Petworth, Sussex, where he rebuilt the parsonage, and was chaplain to the king. He held these preferments with his fellowship at Eton by dispensation from James I.

== Controversial writer ==
On the death, in 1614, of Isaac Casaubon, with whom he had previously corresponded about the Exercitationes ad Baronii Annales (against Baronius), Montagu was directed by the King to publish the work. It appeared the same year, and in 1615 James requested him to prepare an answer to Baronius on similar lines. This work, based on studies of classical and patristic antiquity, was at first apparently held back at Archbishop George Abbot's command, but it was issued in 1622 under the title of Analecta Ecclesiasticarum Exercitationum. In the epistle dedicatory addressed to the King, Montagu states his object to be to trace the origins of Christian faith and doctrine, and show that the Anglican position was derived from the "ancient founts". Montagu's aim was to support the Church of England against its enemies. He would not recognise the foreign Reformed bodies as lawful branches of the church. He never completed the task which he had set himself.

In his Diatribae upon the first part of the late History of Tithes, 1621, he entered directly into the controversy of the day, in an attempt to beat John Selden on tithes. Controversy against Catholic teachers in his parish was answered in a pamphlet called A Gag for the New Gospel, by Matthew Kellison; he replied in A Gagg for the New Gospell? No. A New Gagg for an old Goose, 1624. The 'Gagg' had contained forty-seven propositions which it attributed to the Church of England. Of these Montagu only allowed eight to be her true doctrine, again demarcating Anglican doctrine on two fronts. He also issued a defensive work, rebutting Marco Antonio de Dominis who charged Montagu with supporting "praying unto saints and angels in time of need". It proved a magnet for controversy, with answer after answer coming from the presses. There was a complaint from two East Anglian ministers, John Yates and Nathaniel Ward; Ward had been overseas to 1624, and it was a few years later that he became vicar of Stondon Massey, close to Stanford Rivers in Essex, and one of Thomas Hooker's anti-Laudian group. The House of Commons referred the book to Abbot. Abbot applied for authority to the King, and remonstrated with Montagu. But James himself approved of his work. "If that is to be a Papist" he said, "so am I a Papist". After the pamphlets made by Montagu, Calvinist groups within England accused Montagu, of Arminianism. The charge was denied by Montagu. This led to King Charles I appointing Montagu as Bishop of Chichester in 1628, which further led to tensions between Calvinists, and the Crown. The matter did not rest with the King's death.

== Appello ==
Controversy around Montagu's positions played an important part in the period 1625–1629, both in publications and in political moves, and was one of the issues setting the tone for the reign of Charles I. Montagu had the open support of three bishops (John Buckeridge, John Howson, and William Laud). His Appello Caesarem: a just Appeale from two unjust Informers (London, 1625) came out with an imprimatur from Francis White, dean of Carlisle, after George Abbot's refusal to license it. It was partly written in self-justification, but also attacked some Calvinist tenets, including the perseverance of the saints. Francis Rous defended double predestination against Montagu in Testis Veritatis (1626).

The House of Commons took up the matter, and accused the author of dishonouring the late King (James I). A debate on the matter was followed by Montagu's committal to the custody of the serjeant-at-arms. He was, however, allowed to return to Stanford Rivers on giving a bond. Charles then made Montagu one of his chaplains, and let the Commons know on 9 July that he was displeased. On 11 July parliament was prorogued. On 2 August, when the parliament was sitting at Oxford, Montagu was too ill to attend, and after discussion in which Edward Coke and Robert Heath took part, the matter was allowed to drop. But the question was too serious to rest for long. On 16 and 17 January 1626 a conference was held by Charles's command, as the result of which the bishops of London (George Montaigne), Durham (Richard Neile), Winchester (Lancelot Andrewes), Rochester (Buckeridge), and St. David's (Laud) reported to George Villiers, 1st Duke of Buckingham that Montagu had not gone further than the doctrine of the Church of England, or what was compatible with it.

== York House Conference ==
The January meeting was followed shortly by a watershed conference beginning 11 February, prompted by Robert Rich, 2nd Earl of Warwick in Buckingham's house, York House, Strand, and later called the York House conference. It took place with the Bishop of Lichfield (Thomas Morton) and the master of Emmanuel College, Cambridge (John Preston), representing the opposition to Montagu and Francis White. Buckeridge, supported by White and John Cosin, defended Montagu's orthodoxy. Buckeridge even denied that the Council of Trent had erred in any directly fundamental article of faith. A second conference was held a few days later, at which Montagu defended his theses in person against Morton and Preston. The two days of discussion, attended by nobility, changed no minds.

== Subsequent developments ==
The committee of religion renewed their censure of the Appeal, and the House of Commons voted a petition to the King that the author might be fitly punished and his book burned. The King issued a proclamation (14 June 1626) commanding silence on points of controversy. In March 1628 the House of Commons again appointed a committee of religion to inquire into the cases of Montagu, Roger Mainwaring, and Cosin.

Montagu still had the strongest supporters at court in Laud and Buckingham himself; and on the death of George Carleton, bishop of Chichester and an opponent, he was appointed to the vacant see. He was elected on 14 July 1628 and received dispensation to hold Petworth with his bishopric. On 22 August Montagu was confirmed in Bow Church. During the ceremony one Jones, a stationer, made objection to the confirmation but the objection was over-ruled as informal; and on 24 August he was consecrated at Croydon, on the same day that news came of Buckingham's assassination. A bitter pamphlet, called Anti-Montacutum, an Appeale or Remonstrance of the Orthodox Ministers of the Church of England against Richard Mountague, was published in 1629 at Edinburgh. The House of Commons again took up the matter, and attempts were made at conciliation, by the issue of the declaration prefixed to the Thirty-nine Articles and printed in the Book of Common Prayer, by a letter from Montagu to Abbot disclaiming Arminianism, by the grant of a special pardon to Montagu, and by the issue of a proclamation suppressing the Appello Caesarem.

== Bishop ==
In his diocese Montagu lived at Aldingbourne and Petworth. His process to recover the estate and manor of Selsey, Sussex was decided against him by Robert Heath, now chief justice, in the common pleas, in 1635. He was still engaged in his research into ecclesiastical history, and published several treatises. In 1638 he was at work on a book on the Eucharistic Sacrifice, which he submitted to the approval of Laud. He was also apparently at this time much mixed up in the tortuous negotiations with the papacy which were conducted through Gregorio Panzani; at the same time Montagu was asking licence for his son to visit Rome, and the matter became in the hands of William Prynne a plausible accusation of romanising.

On the translation of Matthew Wren, bishop of Norwich, to Ely, Montagu was appointed to the vacant see. He was elected on 4 May 1638, and the election received the royal assent on 9 May. He had long been suffering from a quartan ague, as well as gout and kidney stones. He was again attacked in the House of Commons on 23 February 1641 on account of a petition from the inhabitants of St. Peter Mancroft, Norwich, against an inhibition directed by the bishop against Mr. Carter, parson of that parish, and a commission was appointed to consider his offences. Before any further steps were taken, he died on 13 April 1641, and was buried in Norwich Cathedral.

== Works ==
Besides works already mentioned, Montagu wrote:

- Antidiatribae ad priorern partem diatribes J. Caesaris Bulengeri, Cambridge, 1625.
- Eusebii de Demonstratione Evangelica libri decem ... omnia studio R. M. Latine facta, notis illustrata, 1628.
- Apparatus ad Origines Ecclesiasticas, Oxford, 1635.
- De Originibus Ecclesiasticis, first part, London, 1636; second part, London, 1640.
- Articles of Inquiry put forth at his Primary Visitation as Bishop of Norwich (unauthorised), Cambridge, 1638; (corrected by the bishop), London, 1638; new edition, Cambridge, 1841.
- Acts and Monuments of the Church, London, 1642.
- Versio et Notae in Photii Epistolas, London, 1651.

== Notes ==
Church of England titles
Preceded by George Carleton	Bishop of Chichester; 1628–1638	Succeeded by Brian Duppa
Preceded by Matthew Wren	Bishop of Norwich; 1638–1641	Succeeded by Joseph Hall
