= Daniel Featley =

English theologian and controversialist

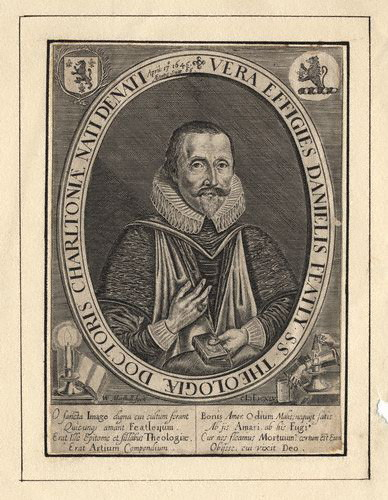
- Daniel Featley, engraving by William Marshall
- Born: 15 March 1582; Charlton-upon-Otmoor, Oxfordshire, England
- Died: April 17, 1645 (aged 63)

Daniel Featley, also called Fairclough and sometimes called Richard Fairclough/Featley (15 March 1582 – 17 April 1645), was an English theologian and controversialist. He fell into difficulties with Parliament due to his loyalty to Charles I of England in the 1640s, and he was harshly treated and imprisoned at the end of his life.

== Early life ==
Daniel Featley was born at Charlton-upon-Otmoor, Oxfordshire, on 15 March 1582, the second son of John Fairclough. by his wife Marian Thrift. His father was cook to Laurence Humphrey, President of Magdalen College, Oxford, and afterwards to Corpus Christi College in the same university. Featley was the first of his family to adopt the surname.

Featley was educated as a chorister of Magdalen College. John Rainolds, President of Corpus, was his godfather and benefactor, and Featley is noted as a protégé of Rainolds, a leading Puritan spokesman. He was admitted scholar of Corpus Christi College 13 December 1594, and probationer fellow 20 September 1602, having taken his B.A. degree on 13 February 1601. He proceeded M.A. on 17 April 1606, and became noted as a disputant and preacher. In 1607 he delivered an oration at Rainolds' funeral.

In 1610 and for the two following years he was chaplain to Sir Thomas Edmondes, the English ambassador at Paris, and was noticed for his attacks on Catholic doctrine and his disputations with Jesuits. Twenty-one of the sermons preached by him in the ambassador's chapel are printed. Featley commenced BD on 8 July 1613, and was the preacher at the act of that year. He seems to have given offence by his plain speaking, even in consecration sermons.

Featley was domestic chaplain to George Abbot, Archbishop of Canterbury. For the benefit of Marc Anthony de Dominis and at Abbot's request, Featley in 1617 kept his exercise for the degree of D.D. under John Prideaux; Prideaux lost his temper, and Abbot had some difficulty in effecting a reconciliation. De Dominis, soon after appointed master of the Savoy, gave Featley a brother's place in that hospital. In 1610 he had preached the rehearsal sermon at Oxford, and by the Bishop of London's appointment he discharged the same duty at St Paul's Cross in 1618.

At the invitation of an old pupil, Ezekiel Arscot, Featley accepted the rectory of North Hill, Cornwall, which he soon vacated on his institution by Abbot to the rectory of St Mary-at-Lambeth, 6 February 1619. On 27 June 1623 a famous conference was held at the house of Sir Humphrey Lynde between Featley and Francis White, the dean of Carlisle, and the Jesuits John Piercy (alias Fisher) and John Sweet; an account was surreptitiously printed the same year, with the title The Fisher catched in his owne Net. Featley, by Abbot's command, prepared an elaborate report of that and other controversies. The king, James I, himself asked to engage with him in a disputation, which Featley afterwards published. Some time before 1625 Abbot gave him the rectory of All Hallows, Bread Street, which Featley was afterwards allowed to exchange for the rectory of Acton, Middlesex, to which he was instituted on 30 January 1627.

In 1622 Featley had married Mrs. Joyce Halloway, or Holloway. She was the daughter of William Kerwyn, and had already been twice married. There being at the time no parsonage at Lambeth, Featley resided in his wife's house at the end of Kennington Lane. He concealed his marriage for some time, in case it should interfere with his residence at Lambeth Palace; but in 1625 he ceased to be chaplain to Abbot. Featley had been refused admission to the palace, because an illness from which he was suffering was supposed to be the plague; it proved to be a sharp attack of ague, and he abruptly resigned.

== Under Charles I ==
Daniel Featley was also a chaplain in ordinary to Charles I of England, and was appointed Provost of the declining Chelsea College in 1630. A devotional manual entitled Ancilla Pietatis was published in 1626 and proved very popular; a sixth edition appeared in 1639, translations into French and other languages were made, and it was a special favourite with Charles I in his troubles.

While Featley and William Laud, Abbot's successor, were not on good terms, he strongly defended the Church of England and episcopacy in the 1640s. He was a witness against Laud in 1634, when the primate was charged with having made superstitious innovations in Lambeth Chapel. Laud, two years later, ordered many passages reflecting on the Roman Catholics in Featley's Clavis Mystica to be obliterated, before allowing the book to be printed. These passages were reproduced by William Prynne, in his Canterburies Doome.

In 1641 Featley was nominated by the House of Lords as one of the subcommittee 'to settle religion,' which met at the Jerusalem Chamber, Westminster, under the presidency of John Williams, then Dean of Westminster. He wrote animadversions on a Catholic tract called A Safegard from Shipwracke to a prudent Catholike, to which he gave the title of Vertumnus Romanus (1642); and began marginal annotations on St Paul's Epistles, which were printed in the Bible issued by the Westminster Assembly in 1645. As the First English Civil War broke out, he was harassed and in some danger. After the Battle of Brentford, 13 November 1642, some of the Earl of Essex's troops, who were quartered at Acton, set fire to his barns and stables, broke open the church, pulled down the font, smashed the windows and burnt the communion rails in the street. On 10 February 1643, in the middle of a service, five soldiers rushed into Lambeth Church intending to murder Featley, who had been warned, and kept out of the way. Two parishioners were wounded and died.

Featley was next brought before the Committee for Plundered Ministers on articles exhibited against him by three of his Lambeth parishioners, whom he styles 'semi-separatists.' On 16 March 1643 he was called into the exchequer chamber to answer the charges. The committee refused to hear his witnesses, and voted him out of his living on 23 March, four only out of seventeen being present. The order was not reported to the Commons until 11 July, when it was negated. Earlier in the year he had been offered, says his nephew John Featley, the chair of divinity at Leyden, but declined it because of age. He attended the meetings of Westminster Assembly, of which he was nominated a member in June. He spoke on behalf of episcopacy, and denounced the alienation of church property and the toleration of new sects. He also refused to assent to all of the solemn league and covenant. His speeches, together with 'sixteen reasons for episcopal government,' are printed in Sacra Nemesis; the speeches alone, as Orationes Synodicae, in the sixth edition of his Dippers Dipt. In consequence of a message from King Charles, whose chaplain he was, Featley eventually withdrew from the assembly. Soon afterwards he was detected in a correspondence with Archbishop James Ussher, then with the King at Oxford, and he was imprisoned as a spy, in Lord Petre's house in Aldersgate Street. According to his sentence, his rectories and library only were ordered to be sequestered, but he was despoiled; Richard Baxter among others sympathised.

During his imprisonment Featley returned to controversy. At the request of the parliament he wrote a treatise against the Catholics. While writing it, says his nephew, he was allowed three books at a time from his library. In January 1644 he published as the third section of The Gentle Lash his 'Challenge' against the puritan divines of the day, in which he offered to vindicate the articles, discipline, and liturgy of the Church of England. Another controversy was with a fellow-prisoner, the Baptist minister, Henry Denne. Featley had on 17 October 1643 held fierce argument in Southwark with William Kiffin and three other Baptists, the substance of which he embodied in his best-known work entitled The Dippers Dipt Denne, hurt by the tone of Featley's diatribe, offered to dispute the ten arguments with him face to face; and then drew up his Antichrist Unmasked, which appeared by 1 April 1645, when Featley was already a dying man; another reply by Samuel Richardson, entitled Some brief Considerations, followed soon afterwards.

Featley was in bad health before his imprisonment, and after eighteen months' confinement he was permitted out on bail to move to Chelsea College for change of air. There he died of asthma and dropsy, 17 April 1645, and on the 21st was buried in the chancel of Lambeth church. The sermon was preached by Dr. William Leo, an old friend.

== Works ==
Daniel Featley was involved in the translation of the King James Version of the Bible. In the project, Featley served in the "First Oxford Company", responsible for the later books of the Old Testament.

His works include:

- Life of John Jewel prefixed to the bishop's collected works in 1609, and again in 1611, mostly an abridgment of the life by Laurence Humphrey. It was reproduced, together with his lives of Rainolds, Robert Abbot, bishop of Salisbury, and others, in Thomas Fuller's Abel Redevivus, 1651.
- Parallelismus nov-antiqui erroris Pelagiarminiani, London, 1630, anonymous tract against Richard Montagu.
- Pelagius Redivivus, or Pelagius raked out of the ashes by Arminius and his schollers, London, 1620, anonymous, containing a translation of the preceding tract.
- A Second Parallel together with a Writ of Error [by Dr. Featley] sued against the Appealer (i.e. Bishop Montagu), London, 1620.
- The grand sacrilege of the Church of Rome in taking away the sacred cup from the Laiety in the Lord's Table . . . Together with two conferences, the former at Paris with D. Smith ... the later at London with Mr. Everard, London, 1630.
- Hexalexium : or, six Cordials to strengthen the Heart of every faithful Christian against the Terrors of Death, London, 1637.
- Transubstantiation exploded; or an encounter with Richard [Smith] the Titularie Bishop of Chalcedon, concerning Christ his presence at his holy Table. . . . Whereunto is annexed a . . . Disputation [touching the same point] held at Paris with C. Bagshaw, London, 1638.
- Θρήνοικος. The House of Mourning; furnished with directions for the houre of death. Delivered in 47 sermons, preached at the funeralls of . . . divers Servants of Christ. By Dr. D. Featly and other, . divines. London, 1640; another edition, London, 1660.
- The Gentle Lash, or the Vindication of Dr. Featley, a knowne Champion of the Protestant Religion; also Seven Articles exhibited against him. With his Answer thereunto. Together with the said Doctor his Manifesto and Challenge, 2 parts (Oxford), 1644; another edition the same year.
- Sacra Nemesis, the Levites Scourge; or, Mercurius Britain. Civicus, disciplin'd. Also diverse remarkable Disputes and Resolves in the Assembly of Divines related, Episcopacy asserted. Truth righted, Innocency vindicated against detraction (anon.). Oxford, 1644.
- Pedum Pastorale et Methodus Concionandi, Utrecht, 1657.
- Featlei Παλιγγενεσία; or, Dr. Daniel Featley revived: proving that the Protestant Church (and not the Romish) is the onely Catholick and true Church. . ., With a succinct History of his Life and Death. Published by John Featley, 2 parts, London, 1660.
- The League illegal: wherein the late solemn league is … examined … and confuted; … written long since in prison by Daniel Featley. … Published by John Faireclough, vulgo Featley. (D. F. his speech before the assembly of divines, concerning the new league and covenant. Dr. Featley's sixteen reasons for Episcopal government, which he intended to have delivered in the assembly . . . but was not permitted, London, 1660.

Featley also published, London, 1638, Sir Humphrey Lynde's posthumous reply to the Jesuit Robert Jenison, entitled A Case for the Spectacle, or a Defence of Via Tuta, together with a treatise of his own called Strictura in Lyndomasttigem, by way of supplement to the Knight's Answer, and a Sermon [on Numb. xxiii, 10] preached at his Funerall at Cobham, June the 14th, 1636 reprinted in the supplement to Edmund Gibson's Preservative from Popery (vol. v. ed. 1849). A set of Latin verses, written by him in 1606, giving an exposition of Jesuitical amphibology, was prefixed to Henry Mason's New Art of Lying, London, 1634.
