= Friday Street, London =

Street in the City of London

Coordinates: 51.5124°N 0.0957°W

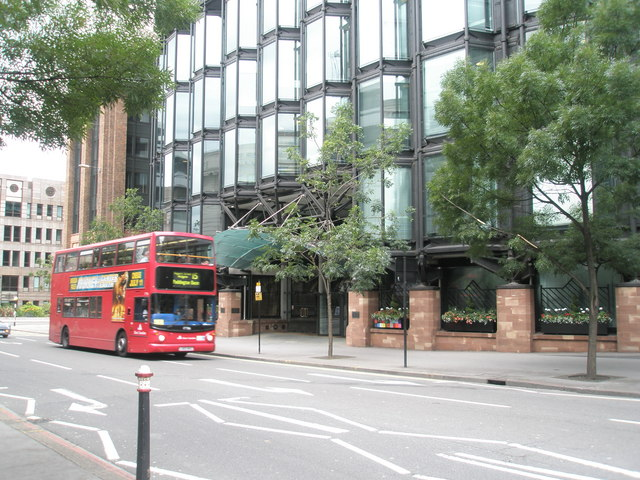
View in 2008

Friday Street is a small street in the City of London, England.

The street is reported to have been named either after a fish market held on Fridays (which was traditionally a day of abstinence from meat), or a corruption of the Old English word Frigdaeges. It originally ran between Cheapside and Old Fish Street and was one of the principal thoroughfares of the Bread Street Ward in Mediaeval London. It was partially cleared to construct Queen Victoria Street, and following damage in World War II, only the section between Queen Victoria Street and Cannon Street remains.

The street once had three churches: St Margaret Moses, St John the Evangelist and St Matthew. All three were destroyed in the Great Fire of London. St Matthew was rebuilt following the fire, but subsequently demolished.

Bracken House sits at the corner of Friday Street and Cannon Street. It was designed by Albert Richardson as the main office and print works of the Financial Times.
