= Robert Butterfield =

Robert Butterfield (fl. 1629) was an English clergyman and controversialist.

== Life ==
Butterfield received his education at Trinity College, Cambridge, where he proceeded B.A. in 1622–3, M.A. in 1626; and then took holy orders.

== Works ==
When the Puritan Henry Burton attacked Bishop Joseph Hall, Butterfield championed the bishop's cause in a pamphlet entitled 'Maschil; or, a Treatise to give instruction touching the State of the Church of Rome . . . for the Vindication of ... the Bishop of Exeter from the cavills of H. B., in his Book intituled "The Seven Vialls,"' 1629. Burton the same year published his 'Babel no Bethel. . . . In answer to Hugh Cholmley's Challenge and Rob. Butterfield's "Maschil," two masculine Champions for the Synagogue of Rome.' He retorts on Butterfield's desire to parade his classical and patristic learning, wishing him 'more ripenesse of yeares, and more soundnesse of judgement, before he doe any more handle such deepe controuersies.' Burton was sent to the Fleet Prison for his pamphlet.

Another reply was published about the same time, under the title of 'Maschil Unmasked,' in which Thomas Spencer, author of The Art of Logick, abused Butterfield.
