= John Yates (divine) =

John Yates (fl. 1612–1660), was an Anglican cleric.

== Life ==
Yates was educated at Emmanuel College, Cambridge, where he graduated B.D. in 1618. He was preacher at St. Andrew's, Norwich from 1616. In 1622 he was presented by Sir Nathaniel Bacon to the rectories of St John and St Mary, Stiffkey in Norfolk.

In 1624 Yates and Nathaniel Ward (1577–1640) complained to a committee of the House of Commons about the Arminian and popish opinions expressed by Richard Montagu in A New Gagg for an Old Goose (1624). As the session was drawing to a close, the Commons referred the complaint to George Abbot, archbishop of Canterbury. Montagu himself referred the matter to the king in his treatise Appello Cæsarem (1625), which was censured by the Commons.

In 1658 Yates was succeeded at Stiffkey by William Mitchel.

== Works ==
In 1622 Yates published A Modell of Divinitie, catechistically composed, wherein is delivered the Matter and Methode of Religion according to the Creed, Ten Commandments, Lord's Prayer, and the Sacraments, London, dedicated to the mayor, officers, and citizens of Norwich. He assisted as editor of a number of the treatises of Jeremiah Burroughs between 1648 and 1660; and was one of those who brought out William Bridge's works between 1649 and 1657. George Walker classed him with Richard Hooker and others as "men of good note in our church".

== Family ==
His son, John Yates, M.D. (died August 1659), is buried on the north side of St. Nicholas Church, Yarmouth.
