= All Hallows, Bread Street =

Coordinates: 51.5131°N 0.0951°W

All Hallows Bread Street
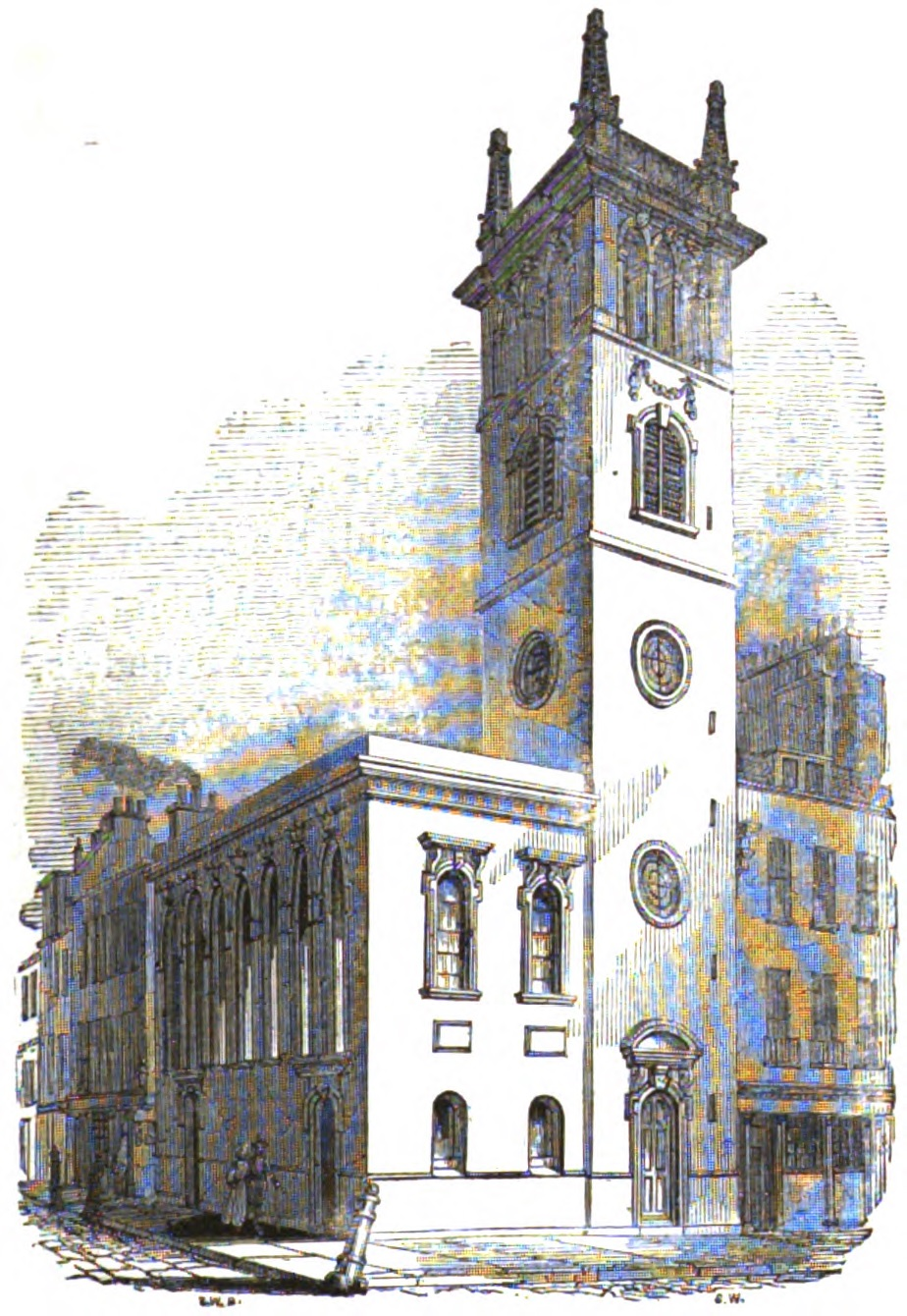
- All Hallows Bread Street
- Location: Watling Street, London
- Country: England
- Denomination: Anglican

Architecture
- Architect: Christopher Wren
- Style: Baroque
- Demolished: 1876

All Hallows Bread Street was a parish church in the Bread Street ward of the City of London, England. It stood on the east side of Bread Street, on the corner with Watling Street. First mentioned in the 13th century, the church was destroyed in the Great Fire of London in 1666. The church was rebuilt by the office of Sir Christopher Wren and demolished in 1876.

== History ==
The dedication All Hallows, meaning all saints, suggests a Saxon foundation, although the earliest surviving reference is in a document of 1227. Bread Street runs from Cheapside, the main street and market place of medieval London, "cheap" meaning market. Bread Street was the site of the bread market.

The patronage of the church belonged to the prior and chapter of Christ Church, Canterbury, until 1365, when they granted it to the Archbishop of Canterbury.

== The medieval church ==
Two separate grants of land to allow the expansion of the church are recorded in 1349 and 1350. Thomas Beaumont, a member of the Salter's company, who died in 1457, founded a chapel on the south side of the chancel, which became known as the "Salter's Chapel", in which he was buried. The pre-Fire church had a stone spire, which was struck by lightning in 1559. Although not badly damaged, it was taken down to save money on repairs

In 1551, the church was closed for a month following a fight between two priests, in which blood was drawn. They were obliged to walk barefoot in penance from St Paul's through Cheapside and Cornhill. In 1555, during the reign of Queen Mary I and King Philip, the rector, Laurence Saunders, was burnt at the stake for preaching Protestant doctrine. John Milton was christened in All Hallows Bread Street in 1608. The event is commemorated by a stone plaque now in the churchyard of St Mary-le-Bow.

A donation from a merchant named Ellyot, who died in 1629, funded a sermon to be preached every Thursday afternoon. The practice continued into the 19th century, when it was suspended "for want of a congregation".

== Rebuilding after the Great Fire ==
After the church's destruction in the Great Fire, the parish was combined with that of St John the Evangelist Friday Street, also destroyed, but not rebuilt. In 1671 a "tabernacle" or temporary church was set up to serve the parishioners of All Hallows and St John's. The reconstruction of All Hallows began in 1681 and the body of the church was complete by 1684. In that year, however, the unfinished tower was boarded over and work on it suspended, due to the difficulty Wren was experiencing in paying for the simultaneous completion of several dozen churches, as well as for the ongoing construction of St Paul's Cathedral, from the Coal Tax receipts. A letter from 1697 survives from the then Lord Mayor, Edward Clarke, lobbying Wren to complete the steeple. Coincidentally or not, work recommenced and the tower was finished the next year. The total cost of the church and tower was £4,881. Among the vestry records are accounts for £12 of "florence" wine (probably Chianti) for Wren and £11 for his assistant Nicholas Hawksmoor.

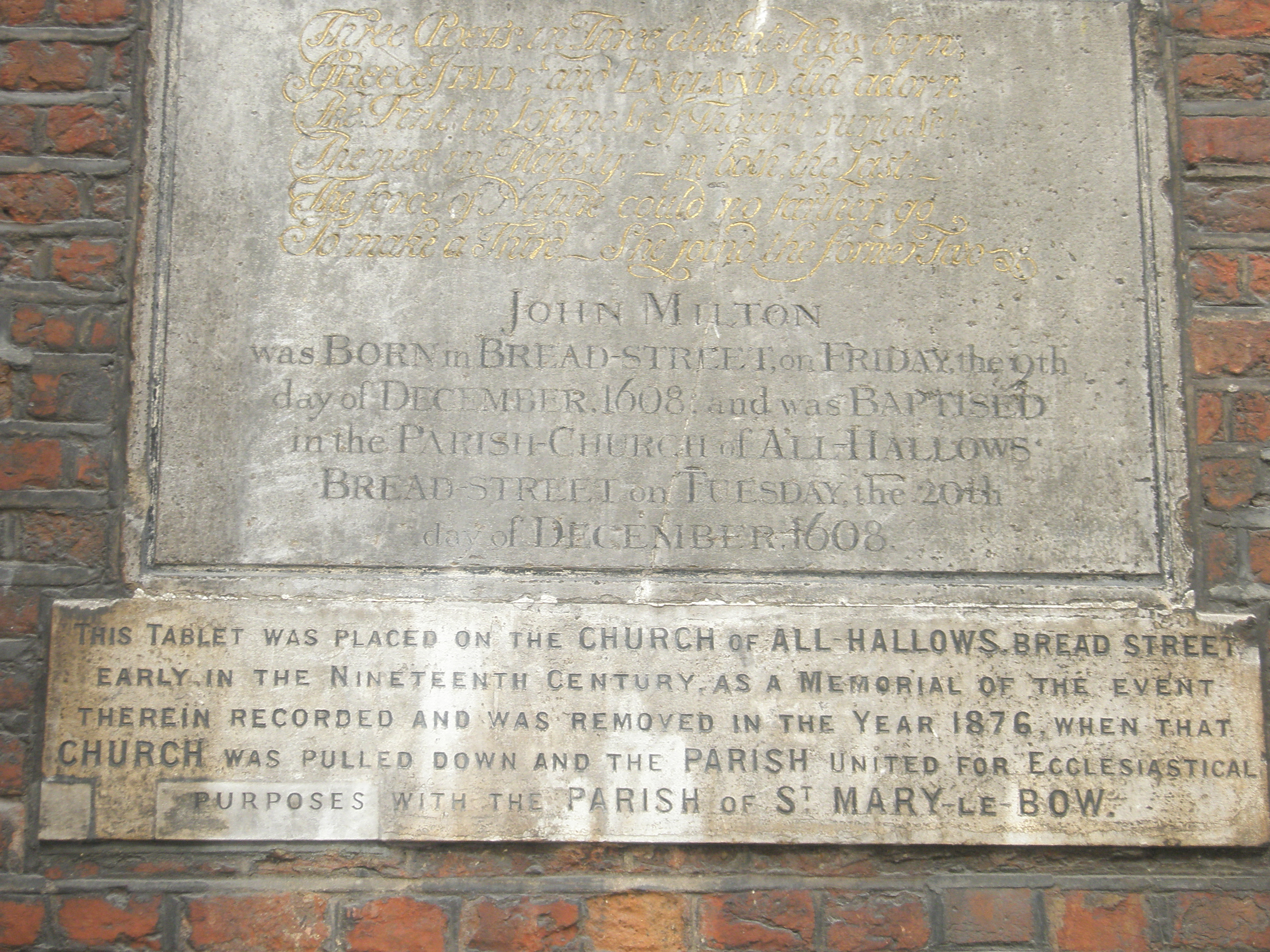
Stone tablet commemorating John Milton, now at St Mary-le-Bow

The main frontage of the reconstructed church faced north onto Watling Street. It had eight round-headed windows (one of them blind) decorated with carved keystones. The plan of the church was in the shape of a slightly irregular quadrilateral with an annex protruding on the south. The walls were topped by a balustrade.

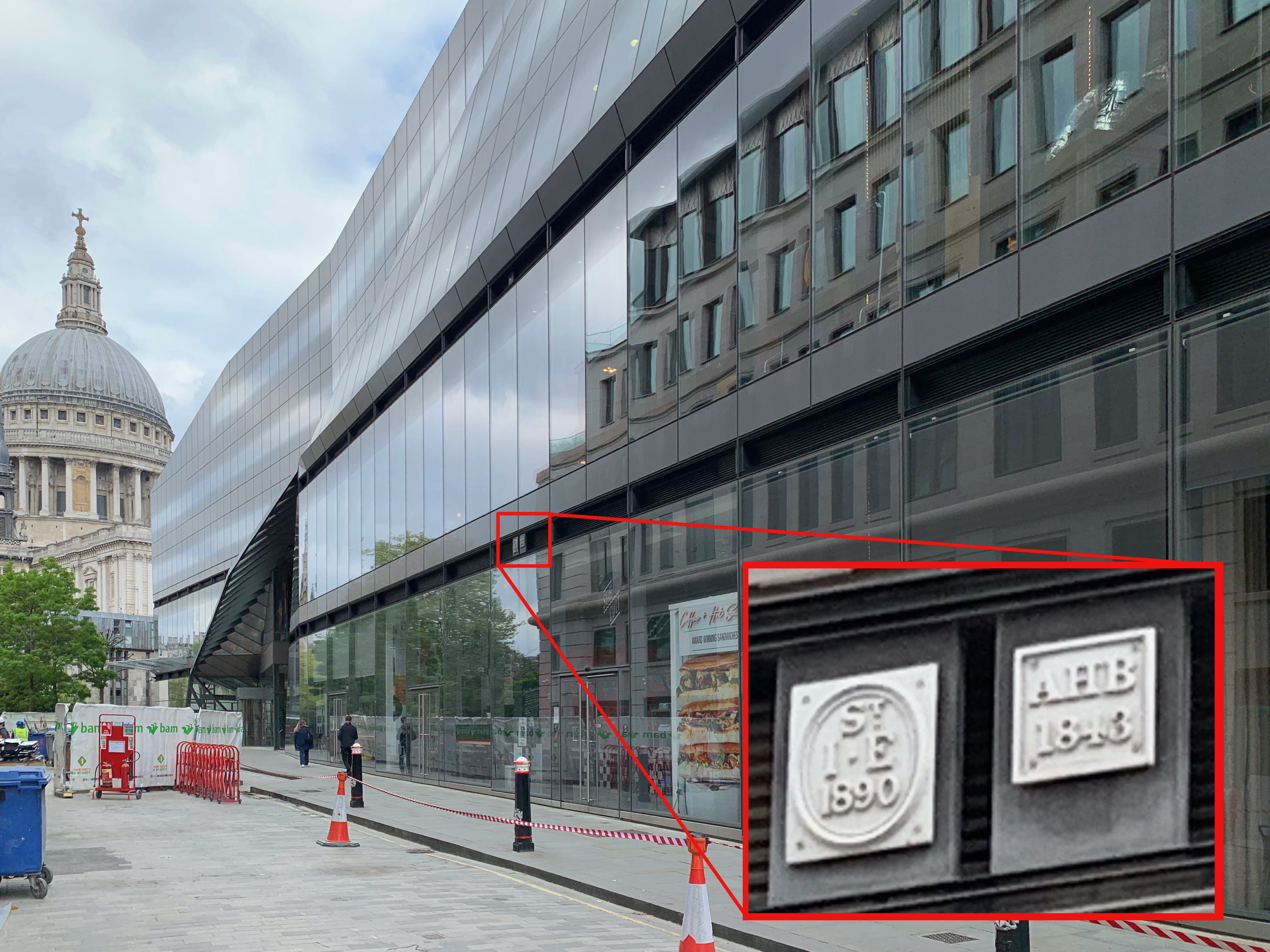
All Hallows Bread Street parish boundary marker in Watling Street

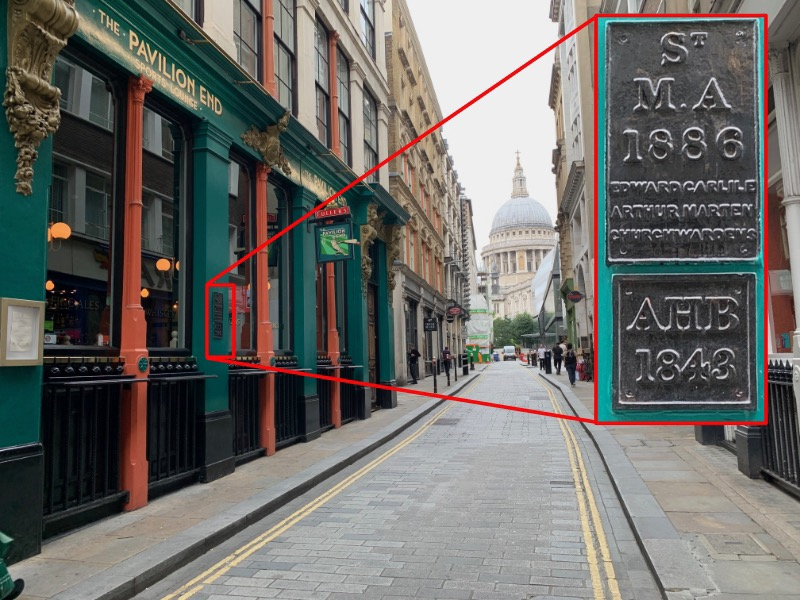
Parish boundary markers for All Hallows Bread Street and St Mary Aldermary

The rebuilt church was 72 ft long and 35 ft wide. The interior was a single space, undivided by piers or columns. A gallery at the west end, supported by a single column, housed an organ, erected by subscription in 1717. By the beginning of the 19th century there was also a small gallery on the south side, "somewhat like a balcony or an orchestra in an assembly room", over the door to the vestry. At the east end was a shallow recess, containing the reredos, with the Royal Arms above.

The steeple, completed 14 years after the rest of the church, was the work of Nicholas Hawksmoor. The tower was square in plan, the top storey having three arched openings on each side, each with a finely carved mask keystone. It was topped by a balustrade, with four obelisks on corner plinths. The belfry level beneath this had round headed windows framed by swags. The stage below that, marking the limit of building in 1684, had round windows.

== Destruction ==
The novelist Mary Anna Lupton was among those resident in the parish and married there in 1854, but by the late 19th century the number of parishioners had declined due to the move of the population to the suburbs. The parish of All Hallows Bread Street was combined with that of St Mary-le-Bow in 1876 and the church demolished in 1878, under the Union of Benefices Act 1860. The site and materials were sold for £32,254 and the proceeds used to build All Hallows, East India Dock Road. The furnishings were dispersed to several churches – the pulpit is now in St Vedast alias Foster, the organ case in St Mary Abchurch and the font cover in St Andrew-by-the-Wardrobe. Some of the wood panelling was used to clad the new chancel extension of 1890 in the Church of King Charles the Martyr in Tunbridge Wells. This includes two large prayer boards either side of the altar depicting the Lord's Prayer and the Apostles Creed.

Initially occupied by warehouses, the site is now covered by the Watling Court development of 1977–81.

== See also ==
- List of Christopher Wren churches in London
- List of churches rebuilt after the Great Fire but since demolished
