= Anthony Wotton =

English clergyman and controversialist

Anthony Wotton (c. 1561 – 1626) was an English clergyman and controversialist, of Puritan views. He was the first Gresham Professor of Divinity. Christopher Hill describes him as a Modernist and Ramist.

== Life ==
He was born in London about 1561, and was educated at Eton College; he then was elected scholar of King's College, Cambridge, being admitted on 1 October 1579. His tutor was William Temple. He graduated B.A. in 1583, and proceeded M.A. in 1587. He was made B.D. in 1594, and in the same year he disputed with John Overall at Cambridge before Robert Devereux, 2nd Earl of Essex, who made him his chaplain. On the death of William Whitaker in the following year Wotton wrote some eulogistic verses, and became a candidate for the regius professorship of divinity vacated by Whitaker; though Wotton was highly commended for his disputation, Overall was elected by the votes of the younger Cambridge men, who preferred Overall's moderate high-church views to Wotton's puritanism.

In March 1596, on the establishment of Gresham College, Wotton was appointed its first professor of divinity. He held the post less than two years, vacating it and his fellowship at King's on his marriage, on 27 October 1598, to Sybell, aged 28, daughter of William Brisley of Isleworth, Middlesex.

Wotton now became lecturer at All Hallows, Barking, a post which he held till his death; all his books are dated from his house on Tower Hill. He failed to obtain further preferment, because of his views, but he became a well-known and popular preacher. In 1604 he was suspended by John Bancroft, his prayer that "the king's eyes might be opened" being taken as an insinuation that the king was blind. The suspension did not last long.

Wotton died on 11 December 1626 in his house on Tower Hill.

== Controversy with Walker ==
In 1611 George Walker (1581?-1651) accused him of Socinianism; this led to a 'conference' of learned divines, which ended in Wotton's vindication. The controversy went on till 1615, and in 1641, long after Wotton's death, Walker repeated his accusations. This provoked Mr. Anthony Wotton's Defence (Cambridge, 1641, published under the name of Thomas Gataker, who, however, only wrote the postscript, the Defence being by Wotton's son, Samuel (see below). Walker replied in A True Relation of the cheife Passages between Mr. Anthony Wotton and Mr. George Walker in ... 1611, and in the Yeares next following ... till 1615 (London, 1642, 4to).

== Family ==
His eldest son, Anthony, born in 1599, died young. The second, Samuel, born on 30 August 1600, was educated at Eton, and elected fellow of King's College, Cambridge; graduated M.A. in 1629, and subsequently D.D., and was presented by the provost of Eton to the rectory of West Wrotham, Norfolk, on 29 April 1640. He died on 4 February 1680–1. Besides the Defence of his father, he translated Pierre de la Ramée's Logic, which was published by his father in 1626 as The Arte of Logicke gathered out of Aristotle (London, 8vo), and was dedicated to James, Viscount Doncaster. The third son, John, also fellow of King's and vicar of Weedon, Northamptonshire, was ejected for refusing the 'engagement' in 1650, and died about 1659.

== Works ==
Wotton was author of:

- A Defence of Perkins's Booke called "A Reformed Catholicke" against the Cauils of a Popish Writer, one B. P. or W. B., (i.e. William Bishop, bishop of Chalcedon) in his "Deformed Reformation," London, 1606, a substantial work of six hundred pages dedicated to the Earl of Salisbury. See William Perkins.
- A Trial of the Romish Clergies Title to the Church. By Way of Answer to a Popish Pamphlet written by one A. D. and entitled "A Treatise of Faith," London, 1608. This provoked A Reply made unto Mr. Anthonie Wotton and Mr. John White (see John White), by A. D., no place, 1612.
- Sermons upon a Part of the first Chapter of the Gospel of St. John, preached in the Parish Church of All Hallows, Barking, in London, London, 1609.
- Runne from Rome, or a Treatise shewing the Necessitie of separating from the Church of Rome, London, 1624: 2nd edit. 1636: in this work Wotton seeks to confute Cardinal Bellarmine.
- De Reconciliatione Peccatoris libri v., Basle, 1624.

Academic offices
| Preceded by none | Gresham Professor of Divinity; 1597–1599 | Succeeded by Hugh Gray |
