= Tom Ball (cricketer) =

Australian cricketer (1921–2002)

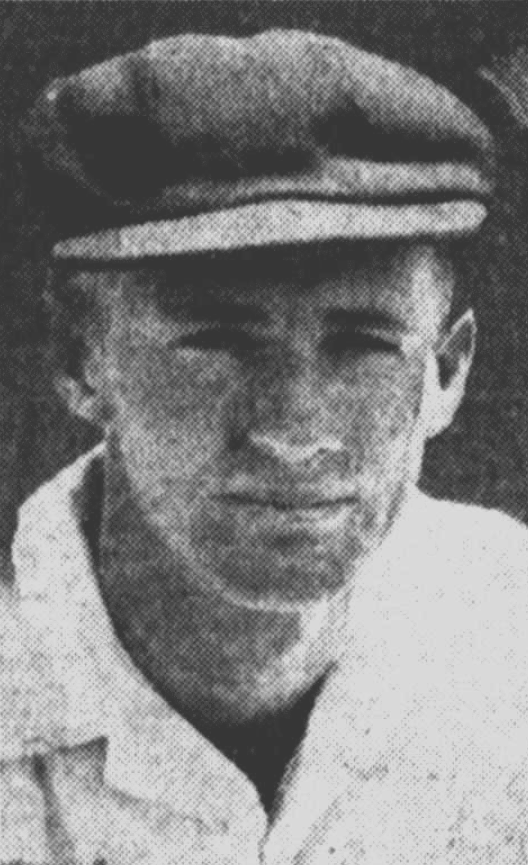

Personal information
- Born: 3 December 1921; Atherton, Queensland, Australia
- Died: 13 January 2002 (aged 80); Cairns, Queensland, Australia
- Source: Cricinfo, 1 October 2020

Tom Ball (3 December 1921 – 13 January 2002) was an Australian cricketer. He played in three first-class matches for Queensland in 1947.

Ball began his cricket career in Cairns. In 1945 he played in the Queensland country cricket carnival and performed extremely well as a fast bowler and in October 1946 he began playing for the Colts in Brisbane Grade Cricket while staying in Brisbane for that seasons country cricket carnival. In December 1946 he was selected in a Queensland Country side which played the visiting English Test team in Gympie and he took 5 for 69.

In January 1947 Ball was described as the second fastest bowler in Queensland after John Ellis and that month he was selected in the state team after Ellis declined selection with the media speculating he may be able to succeed Ellis as Queensland' main fast bowler. After his selection it was reported he was also able to score runs with open-shouldered strokes and he was compared to Ray Lindwall as a batsman. He was the first Cairns cricketer to be selected to represent the State.

Ball made his First-class debut against Victoria in Brisbane in late January and took 1 for 38 in the match which Queensland lost by an innings, and he played a second match in the 1946/47 season against South Australia in Brisbane taking 2 for 45 and 2 for 23. He played his last First-class game at the start of the 1947/48 season in October 1947 against New South Wales in Brisbane and took career best figures of 3 for 57 in the first innings but went wicketless in the second.

As of 1949 Ball was still bowling with success in Cairns cricket.

== See also ==
- List of Queensland first-class cricketers
