= Thomas Ball (priest, born 1590) =

- Born: 1590; Alberbury in Shropshire
- Died: 1659 (aged 69)
- Occupation: Priest

Thomas Ball (1590–1659) was an English divine. He wrote only one book, Ποιμηνόπυργος — Pastorum Propugnaculum, or the Pulpit's Patronage against the Force of Unordained Usurpation and Invasion (London, 1656).

== Life ==
Ball was born at Alberbury in Shropshire. While still young he was appointed usher in the then famous school of Mr. Puller, at Epping, in Essex, where he stayed for two years. Then he entered Queens' College, Cambridge in 1615. He proceeded M.A. in 1625. He was received by John Preston as a pupil as recommended by Puller; when Preston became master of Emmanuel College, he took Ball along with him from Queens'.

Ball obtained a fellowship, and had a large group of pupils; his exercises and sermons at St. Mary's gained him distinction as a preacher. He became vicar of All Saints Church, Northampton in 1629, and conducted the weekly lecture there for about twenty-seven years.

He was three times married, and had a large family. He died, aged sixty-nine, in 1659, and was buried 21 June. His funeral sermon was preached by his neighbour, John Howes; it was published under the title of Real Comforts, and included notes on his life.

== Works ==
Ball printed only one book, Ποιμηνόπυργος — Pastorum Propugnaculum, or the Pulpit's Patronage against the Force of Unordained Usurpation and Invasion. (London, 1656). Pastorum Propugnaculum is a defence of the Church of England: it vindicates the reasonableness and scripturalness of 'ordination' and of adequate learning; but states the objections of opponents.

Ball, with Thomas Goodwin, also edited and published the numerous posthumous works of his friend John Preston.
