= John Melvin Yates =

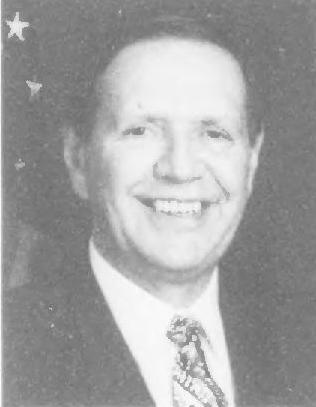

Personal details
- Born: November 25, 1939 (age 86) Superior, Montana, U.S.
- Education: Stanford University (A.B.); Fletcher School of Law and Diplomacy (M.A., M.A.L.D., Ph.D)
- Occupation: Ambassador

John Melvin Yates (born November 25, 1939, in Superior, Montana) is a Career Foreign Service Officer, who has held several ambassadorships during his career. He was the American Ambassador Extraordinary and Plenipotentiary to Cape Verde (1983-1986), Chargé d’Affaires ad interim (Congo (Kinshasa) 1992-1995), Ambassador Extraordinary and Plenipotentiary to Benin (1995-1998), and concurrent positions to Cameroon and Equatorial Guinea (1999-2001).

Yates graduated from Stanford University (A.B., 1961) and the Fletcher School of Law and Diplomacy (M.A., 1962; M.A.L.D., 1963; Ph. D., 1972).

In March 2000, Yates was slightly injured during an attempted carjacking when he left an embassy function in Cameroon.
