= John Percy (Jesuit) =

English Jesuit priest

John Percy (or Piercey; alias John Fisher; born 27 September 1569, Durham – died 3 December 1641, London) was an English Jesuit priest and controversialist.

== Life ==
A Catholic convert aged 14, he went first to Reims, in 1586, then to the English College, Rome, 1589–94. Returning to Belgium, he entered the Jesuit novitiate, 2 May 1594, and then set out for England in 1596. He was, however, arrested by the Dutch, tortured, and sent prisoner to London.

He managed to escape, and became the companion of Father Gerard in several adventures. He was seized at Great Harrowden (November, 1605) at the time of the Gunpowder Plot, but was eventually banished at the request of the Spanish ambassador (1606). Retiring to Belgium he was for a time head of the English Jesuits, then professor of Scripture at the Jesuit house of studies in Leuven, after which he returned again to England.

He was again imprisoned and condemned to death (1610). He had already begun to write on current controversies, and when James I of England desired a series of disputations in 1622, Percy, who was then in a prison in London, was required to defend the Catholic side. In these disputations King James himself and William Laud took a leading part. These controversies were afterwards printed and discussed by Percy and John Floyd on the Catholic side, and by Laud, Francis White, John White, Daniel Featley, and Anthony Wotton on the Protestant.

Percy was eventually released in 1625 and ordered to banishment in 1635; but he was allowed to remain in London until his death. As a result of Percy's efforts, Mary, Countess of Buckingham and William Chillingworth became converts to the Catholic Church.

== See also ==
- Henry Foley, Records of the English Province of the Society of Jesus(London, 1877);
- Sommervogel, Bibliothèque de la C. de J. (Paris, 1892);
- William Laud, Conference with Fisher the Jesuit (London, 1901).
