= John Featley =

John Featley, also known as John Fairclough (c.1605 – 1666), was a chorister and divine. He was a chaplain to Charles I. His uncle was the theologian Daniel Featley.

== Life ==
The son of John Fairclough, the elder brother of Daniel Featley, he was born in Northamptonshire in or about 1605. He was admitted either clerk or chorister at All Souls' College, Oxford, and took his B.A. degree on 25 February 1624. After being ordained he went to Saint Kitts, the first preacher in the colony, in 1626. During 1635 and 1636 he was curate to his uncle at Lambeth, and probably at Acton. In 1639 he was made chaplain to Charles I, in the First Bishops' War. When the First English Civil War was turning adverse for the royalists, he was persuaded by his uncle to return to Saint Kitts, for which he sailed with his wife, children, and servants from Tilbury on 24 June 1643.

In 1646 Featley was in Flushing, Netherlands. After the Restoration he was appointed on 29 June 1660 chaplain extraordinary to the king, who presented him on 13 August to the precentorship of Lincoln, and in September following to a prebend in Lincoln Cathedral. In 1661 he was rector of Langar, Nottinghamshire; he was later instituted to the vicarage of Edwinstowe, Nottinghamshire. On 7 June 1661 he was created by royal mandamus D.D. at Oxford.

Featley died at Lincoln in 1666, and was buried in a chapel in the Lincoln Cathedral.

== Works ==
Featley published at least two of his uncle's tracts, together with his life, and was himself author of:

- Sermon to the West India Company [on Joshua i. 9], London, 1629.
- Obedience and Submission. A Sermon [on Heb. xiii. 17] preached … 8 Dec. 1635, London, 1636.
- A Fountain of Teares emptying itselfe into three rivelets, viz., of (1) Compunction. (2) Compassion. (3) Devotion, Amsterdam, 1646; another edition, London, 1683. His portrait, a small head, appears on the engraved title of the first edition of this manual.
