= Francis White (bishop) =

English bishop and controversialist

The Right Reverend Francis White
- Bishop of Ely
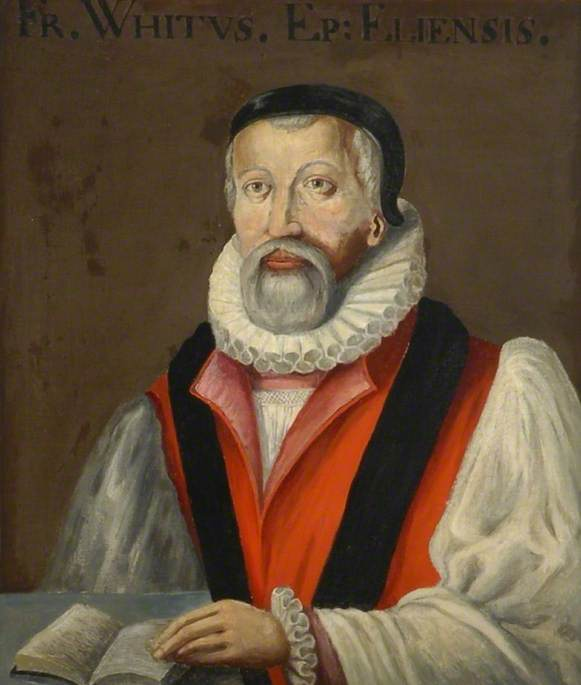
- Diocese: Diocese of Ely
- In office: 1631–1638
- Predecessor: John Buckeridge
- Successor: Matthew Wren
- Other posts: Dean of Carlisle (1622–26); Bishop of Carlisle (1626–29); Bishop of Norwich (1629–31)

Personal details
- Born: c. 1564 Eaton Socon, Bedfordshire
- Died: February 1638 Ely House, Holborn, London
- Buried: St Paul's Cathedral
- Denomination: Anglican
- Education: Gonville and Caius College, Cambridge

Francis White (c. 1564 – 1638) was an English bishop and controversialist.

== Life ==
He was son of Peter White (died 19 December 1615), vicar of Eaton Socon, Bedfordshire, was born at Eaton Socon about 1564 (parish register begins in 1566). His father had five sons, all clergymen, among them John White (1570?–1615), chaplain to James I. Francis, after passing through the grammar school at St Neots, Huntingdonshire, was admitted pensioner at Gonville and Caius College, Cambridge, on 20 March 1579, aged 15. He graduated Bachelor of Arts (BA) in 1583, Cambridge Master of Arts (MA Cantab) in 1586, and was ordained priest by John Aylmer, Bishop of London, on 17 May 1588.

His early preferments were the rectory of Broughton Astley, Leicestershire, a lectureship at St. Paul's Cathedral, London, and the rectory of St. Peter's, Cornhill, London. In controversy against Catholicism he took a prominent part, and it produced his first publication. He graduated Doctor of Divinity (DD) in 1618. Early in 1622 he was employed by James I as a disputant against John Percy alias Fisher (1569–1641), to stay the Roman Catholic tendencies of Mary, Countess of Buckingham. He held two conferences; the third (24 May 1622) was entrusted to William Laud. White's Replie to Fisher (1624) was dedicated to James I. On 14 September 1622 White was presented to the deanery of Carlisle (installed 15 October). He took part, in conjunction with Daniel Featley, in another discussion with Fisher, opened on 27 June 1623, at the house of Humphrey Lynde, in Sheer Lane, London.

In 1625 White became senior dean of Sion College, London, which existed then only on paper. He was consecrated Bishop of Carlisle on 3 December 1626 at Durham House, London, by Richard Neile, Bishop of Durham; John Buckeridge, Bishop of Rochester; and three other prelates, John Cosin preaching the consecration sermon. His elevation was much canvassed. It was said that he had 'sold his orthodoxe bookes and bought Jesuits'.' Sir Walter Earle referred to the matter in parliament (11 February 1628), quoting the line 'Qui color albus erat, nunc est contrarius albo'. He was made Lord Almoner the same year.

On 22 January 1629 he was elected Bishop of Norwich; and he was elected Bishop of Ely on 15 November 1631. Shortly afterwards he held a conference at Ely House, Holborn, with Theophilus Brabourne on the Sabbath question, and had much to do with Brabourne's subsequent prosecution. His Treatise of the Sabbath-Day (1635; 3rd ed. 1636) was dedicated to Laud and written at the command of Charles I. White treated the question doctrinally; its historical aspect was assigned to Peter Heylyn. He visited Cambridge in 1632, to consecrate the chapel of Peterhouse. His last publication was An Examination and Confutation of . . . A Briefe Answer to a late Treatise of the Sabbath-Day, 1637; this Briefe Answer was a dialogue by Richard Byfield, with title The Lord's Day is the Sabbath Day (1636). He died at Ely House, Holborn, in February 1638, and was buried in St. Paul's Cathedral. His will, dated 4 March 1637, proved 27 February 1638 by his widow Joane White, shows that he survived a son, and left married daughters and several grandchildren; the bulk of his property went to his grandson Francis White.

Among many, White ordained Ralph Wheelock, Clare College graduate, and first schoolmaster of America's first free school in Dedham, Massachusetts, on 6 May 1630.

== Theology ==
Francis White had an Arminian theology. In 1626, together with John Cosin they engaged in theological debate with Calvinist John Preston and Thomas Morton.

== See also ==
- List of the Bishops of the Diocese of Norwich, England and its precursor offices

== Notes and references ==
=== Sources ===
- Foster, Andrew (2013). Church of England 1570-1640. New York: Routledge.

=== Attribution ===
- This article incorporates text from a publication now in the public domain: "White, Francis (1564?-1638)". Dictionary of National Biography. London: Smith, Elder & Co. 1885–1900.

Church of England titles
Preceded by Christopher Perkins	Dean of Carlisle; 1622–1626	Succeeded by William Peterson
Preceded by Richard Senhouse	Bishop of Carlisle; 1626–1629	Succeeded by Barnaby Potter
Preceded by Samuel Harsnett	Bishop of Norwich; 1629–1631	Succeeded by Richard Corbet
Preceded by John Buckeridge	Bishop of Ely; 1631–1638	Succeeded by Matthew Wren
