= St John the Evangelist Friday Street =

Coordinates: 51°30′43″N 0°5′36″W

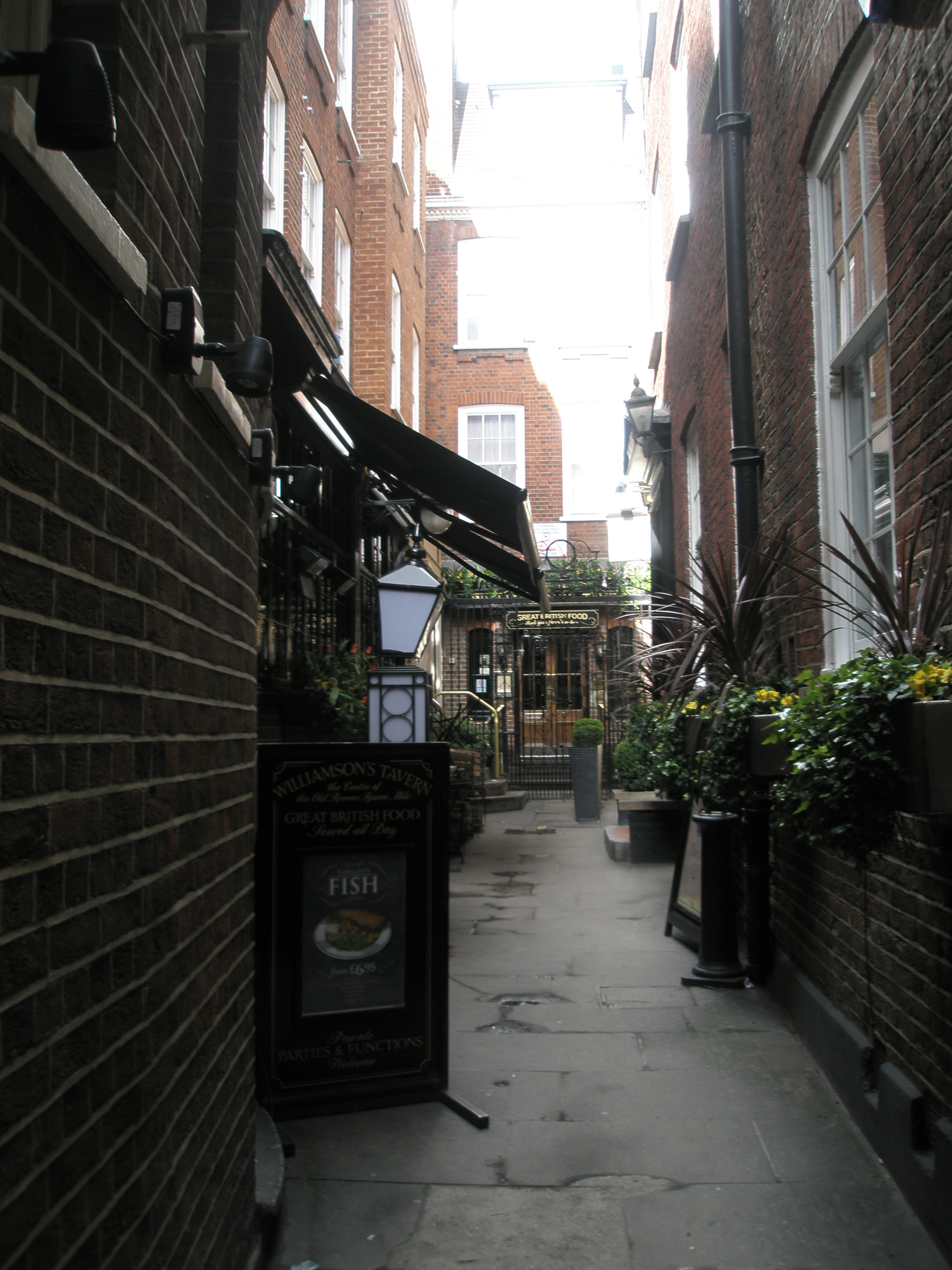
- Current photo of site
- St John the Evangelist Friday Street
- Denomination: Anglican

Architecture
- Demolished: 1666

St John the Evangelist Friday Street was a church in Bread Street Ward of the City of London. It was destroyed in the Great Fire of London of 1666, and not rebuilt, the parish being united with that of All Hallows, Bread Street.

== History ==
Wenceslaus Hollar's “Exact Surveigh” of the City of London, 1667 shows it at the intersection of Friday Street and Watling Street, to the south-east, although Peller's Londinium Redivivum states that it "was situated on the south side of Bread Street, where that street forms an angle with Friday Street". In the early 18th century, some years after the destruction of the church itself, the parish was described as covering "part of Watling Street", the number of houses being "24 and an half." The patronage of the church belonged to the prior and abbey of Christchurch, Canterbury until the dissolution, and then to the dean and chapter of Canterbury Cathedral.

In the early 1620s a debate was held between George Walker, the church's puritan rector, and some Roman Catholics. The pastor argued that the Church of England was the "true church" and that the Church of Rome was "the whore of Babylon". The Catholic priests replied that "you Protestants in England, have no Church nor Faith." The debate, which was conducted mainly in a series of syllogisms, was published in a pamphlet.

The building was renovated at the cost of the parishioners in 1626, and in the same year a gallery was added at the sole expense parishioner Thomas Goodyeare. Burials at the church included Sir Christopher Askew, who was Lord Mayor of London in 1533.

The parish was the only City of London parish not to register a single death during the Great Plague of 1665–6.

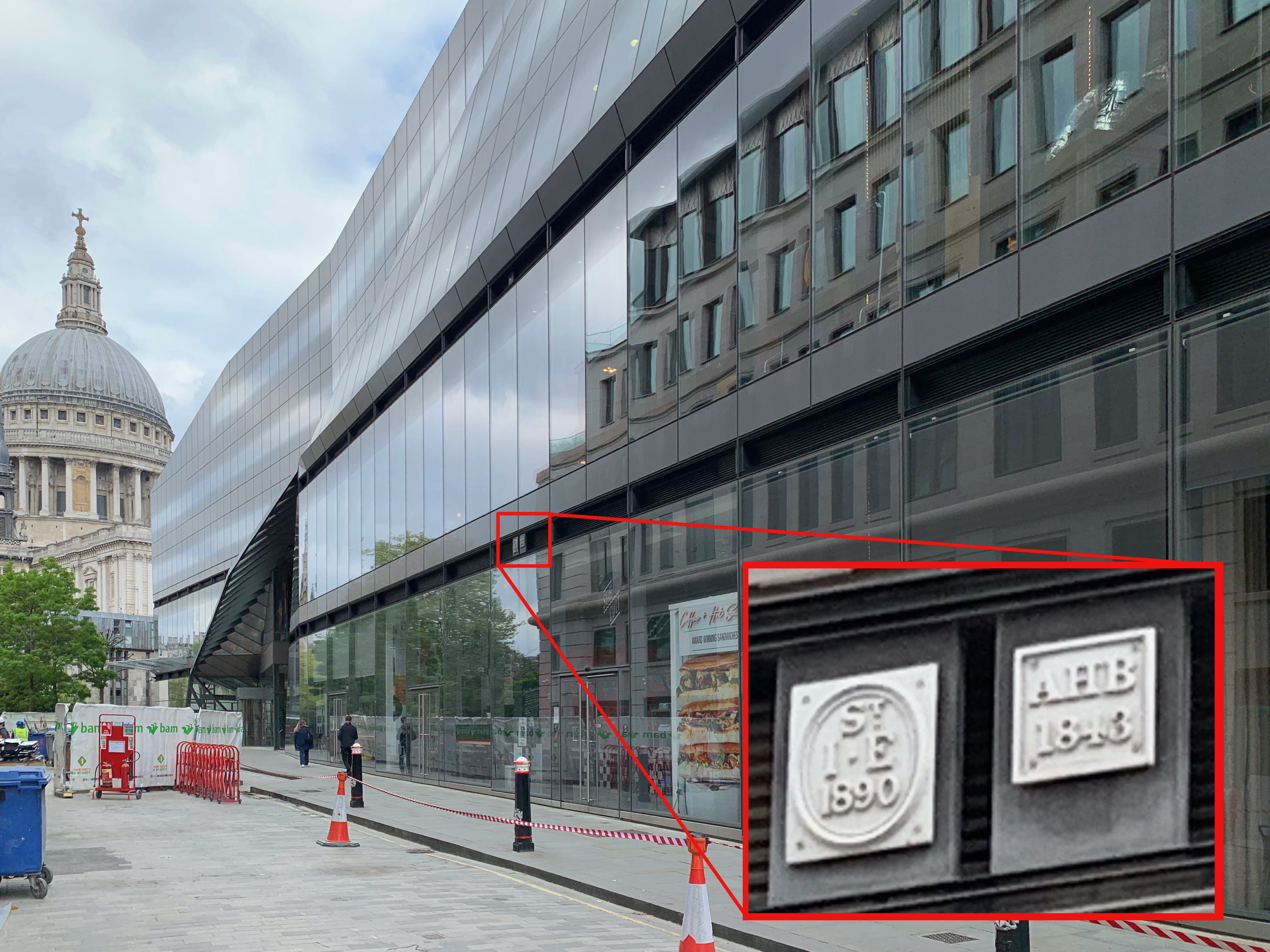
St John the Evangelist parish boundary marker in Watling Street

== Destruction ==
St John the Evangelist was, along with most of the other churches in the City of London, destroyed by the Great Fire in September 1666. In 1670 a Rebuilding Act was passed and a committee set up under Sir Christopher Wren to decide which would be rebuilt. St John the Evangelist Friday Street was not one of those chosen, perhaps because of the small size of its parish, which covered just under an acre. Instead the parish was united to that of All Hallows, Bread Street and the site of the church retained for use as a graveyard, a wall and railing being erected by subscription in 1671.
