= Nicholas Felton (bishop) =

English academic and bishop

The Right Reverend Nicholas Felton
- Bishop of Ely
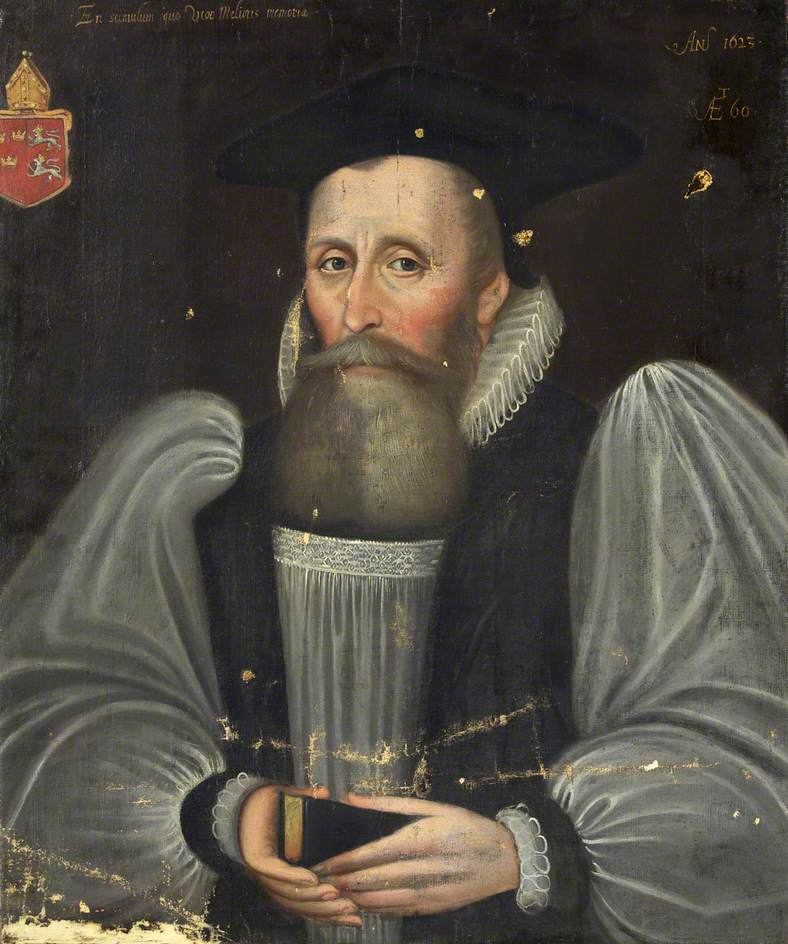
- Bishop Felton
- Church: Church of England
- Diocese: Ely
- See: Ely
- Predecessor: Lancelot Andrewes
- Successor: John Buckeridge

Orders
- Ordination: 21 September 1617 by John Bridges
- Consecration: 14 December 1617 by George Abbot

Personal details
- Born: 3 August 1563 Great Yarmouth
- Died: 5 October 1626 (aged 63) Chingford
- Buried: St John the Baptist upon Walbrook
- Parents: John Felton Sr., Margaret Manning
- Spouse: Elizabeth Baker
- Children: Robert, John, Nicholas, Stewart
- Education: Christ Church, Oxford

Ordination history
History
Diaconal ordination
- Ordained by: John Bridges
Priestly ordination
- Ordained by: John Bridges
Episcopal consecration
- Principal consecrator: George Abbot
- Co-consecrators: Marco Antonio de Dominis; John King; Lancelot Andrewes; John Buckeridge; John Overall

Nicholas Felton (1556–1626) was an English academic, the Bishop of Bristol from 1617 to 1619, and then Bishop of Ely.

== Life ==
He was born in Great Yarmouth and educated at Pembroke Hall, Cambridge. He was rector of St Mary-le-Bow church in London, from 1597 to 1617; and also rector at St Antholin, Budge Row. St Antholin's was on Watling Street, and it has been suggested that the 1606 play The Puritan, or the Widow of Watling Street alludes to Felton through the name Nicholas St Antlings of one of the Widow's serving men.

He was Master at Pembroke, where he became a Fellow in 1583, from 1616 to 1619. In university politics, he conspicuously supported Thomas Howard, Earl of Berkshire, against George Villiers, Duke of Buckingham, in an election for the position of Chancellor of the University of Cambridge, in 1626. King Charles I of England supported Buckingham, and this contest became a test of strength of the religious groups, Puritan and Anglican. He employed as chaplain Edmund Calamy, who had studied at Pembroke, already dissenting from orthodox Anglican belief.

His death was the occasion of an early Latin poem by John Milton.

== Notes ==
Academic offices
Preceded by Samuel Harsnett	Master of Pembroke College, Cambridge; 1616–1619	Succeeded by Jerome Beale
Church of England titles
Preceded by John Thornborough	Bishop of Bristol; 1617–1619	Succeeded by Rowland Searchfield
Preceded by Lancelot Andrewes	Bishop of Ely; 1619–1626	Succeeded by John Buckeridge
