= John Buckeridge =

English churchman (died 1631)

The Right Reverend John Buckeridge
- Bishop of Ely
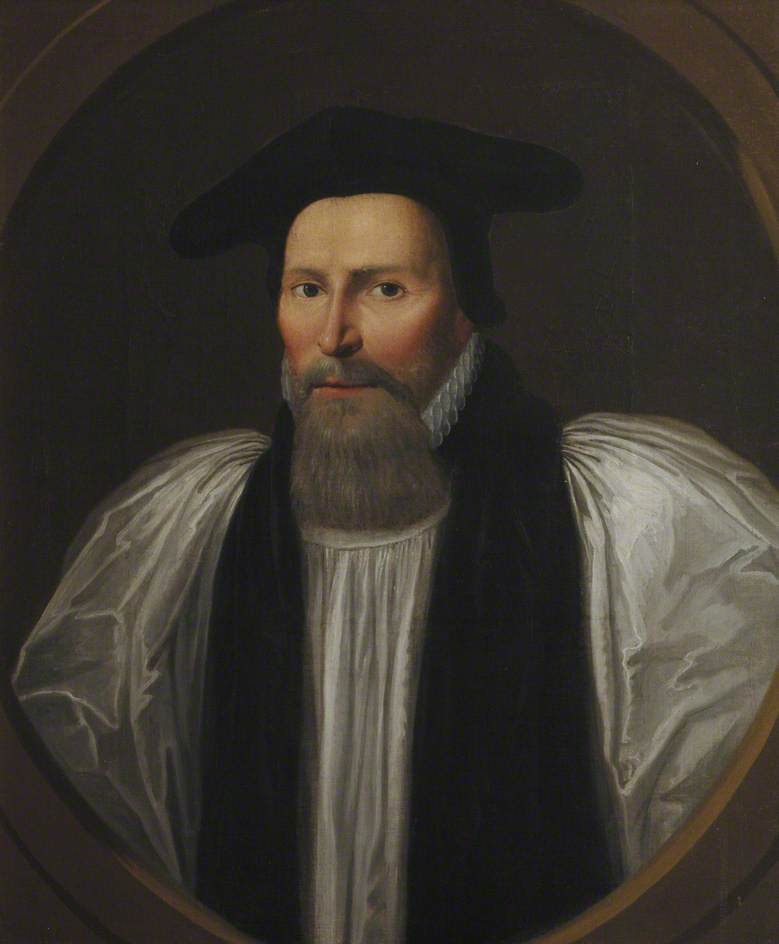
- Church: Church of England
- Diocese: Diocese of Ely
- Elected: 1628
- Term ended: 1631 (death)
- Predecessor: Nicholas Felton
- Successor: Francis White
- Other posts: Bishop of Rochester; 1611–1628

Orders
- Consecration: 9 June 1611 by George Abbot

Personal details
- Born: c. 1562 Draycot Foliat, Wiltshire, England
- Died: 23 May 1631
- Denomination: Anglican
- Parents: William Buckeridge of Draycot Foliat and Elizabeth Kibblewhite
- Profession: Theologian
- Education: St John's College, Oxford

John Buckeridge (c. 1562 – 23 May 1631) was an English churchman and theologian.

== Biography ==
John Buckeridge was born c. 1562 in Draycot Foliat, the son of William Buckeridge of Draycot Foliat and his wife Elizabeth Buckeridge (née Kibblewhite). His paternal grandparents were John Buckeridge of Basildon, Berkshire, who died c. 1574 and his wife Agnes, who died c. 1576. His maternal grandfather was Thomas Kibblewhite of Basildon, Berkshire. He was educated at the Merchant Taylors' School, Northwood and then at St John's College, Oxford, Thomas Kibblewhite, his maternal grandfather was first cousin to the founder, Sir Thomas White. He became a fellow of his college, and acted as tutor to William Laud, whose opinions were perhaps shaped by Buckeridge. After Oxford, Buckeridge held several livings, and was highly esteemed by King James I, whose chaplain he became.

In 1605 Buckeridge was elected President of St. John's College, a position which he vacated on being made bishop of Rochester in 1611. He was transferred to the bishopric of Ely in 1628, and died on 23 May 1631.

The bishop won some fame as a theologian and a controversialist. Among his intimate friends was Bishop Lancelot Andrewes, whose Ninety-six Sermons were published by Laud and Buckeridge in 1629.

== Theology ==
Buckeridge is described as a convinced Arminian.

== Notes and references ==
=== Sources ===
- Davies, Horton (2004). Like Angels from a Cloud: The English Metaphysical Preachers 1588-1645. Eugene, OR: Wipf and Stock Publisher.
- Solt, Leo Frank (1990). Church and State in Early Modern England, 1509-1640. Oxford: Oxford University Press.
- Tyacke, Nicholas (2001). Aspects of English Protestantism C. 1530-1700. Manchester: University Press.

Academic offices
Preceded by Ralph Hutchinson	President of St John's College, Oxford; 1606–1611	Succeeded by William Laud
Church of England titles
Preceded by Richard Neile	Bishop of Rochester; 1611–1628	Succeeded by Walter Curll
Preceded by Nicholas Felton	Bishop of Ely; 1628–1631	Succeeded by Francis White
