= Butley Priory =

Grade I listed building in Suffolk, UK

Coordinates: 52.091°N 1.465°E

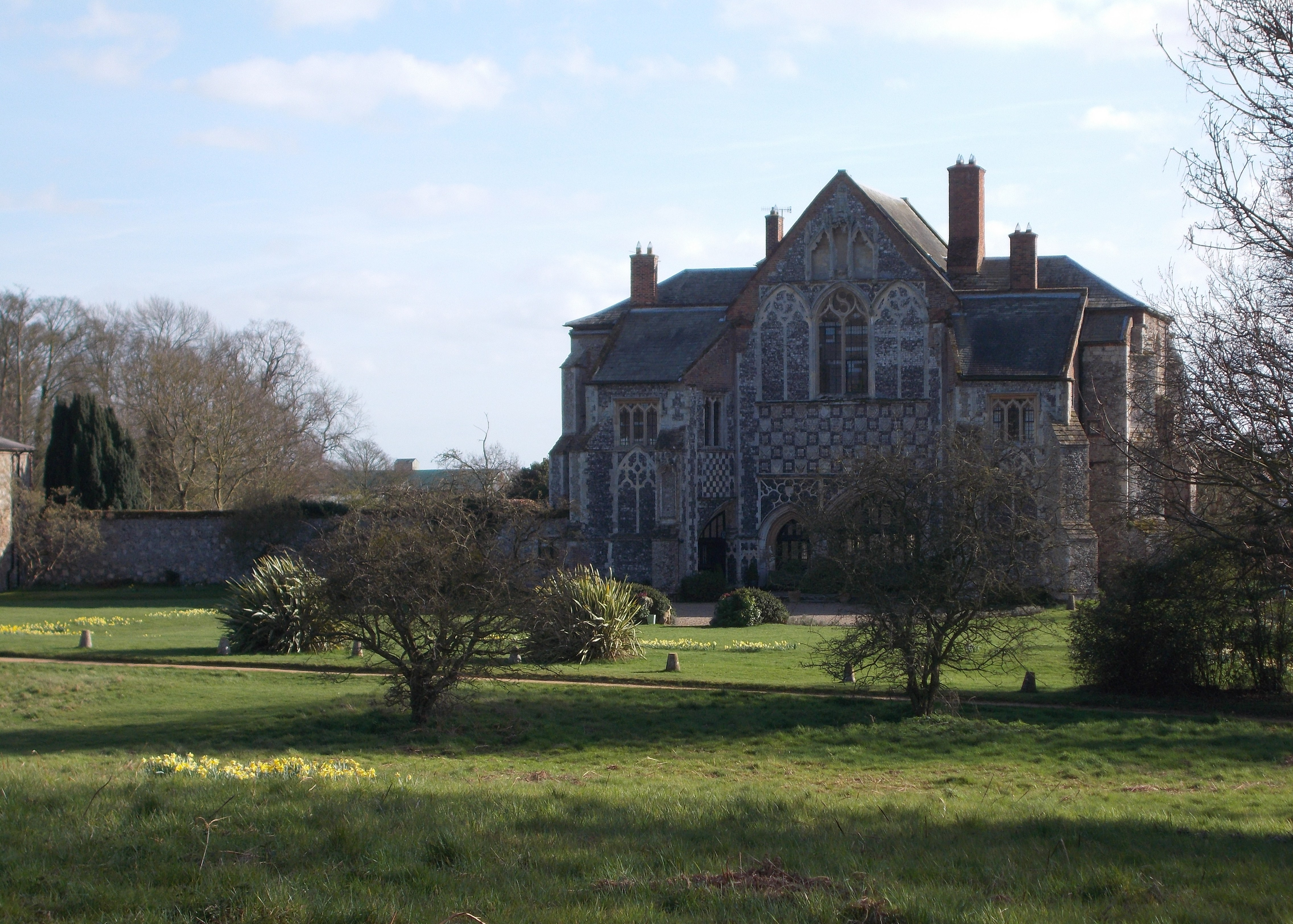
North front of the 14th-century gatehouse of Butley Priory

Butley Priory, sometimes called Butley Abbey, was a religious house of Canons regular (Augustinians, Black canons) in Butley, Suffolk, dedicated to The Blessed Virgin Mary. It was founded in 1171 by Ranulf de Glanville (c. 1112-1190), Chief Justiciar to King Henry II (1180-1189), and was the sister foundation to Ranulf's house of White canons (Premonstratensians) at Leiston Abbey, a few miles to the north, founded c. 1183. Butley Priory was suppressed in 1538.

Although only minor fragments of the priory church and some masonry of the convent survive at Abbey Farm, the underground archaeology was expertly investigated and interpreted in 1931-33, shedding much light on the lost buildings and their development. The remaining glory of the priory is its 14th-century Gatehouse, incorporating the former guest quarters. This exceptional building, largely intact, reflects the interests of the manorial patron Guy Ferre the younger (died 1323), Seneschal of Gascony to King Edward II 1308-1309, and was probably built in the priorate of William de Geytone (1311–32). Having fallen into decay after 1538, it was restored to use as a private house about 280 years ago.

Near-complete lists of the priors survive from 1171 to 1538, together with foundation deeds, deeds of grant, and records pertaining to the priory's manors, holdings and visitations. In addition there is a Register or Chronicle made in the last decades of the priory, and there are sundry documents concerning its suppression. Its post-Dissolution history has also been investigated. In private ownership in the area of the Suffolk Heritage Coast, the Gatehouse is now a Grade I listed building and is used as a venue for private functions, corporate events or retreats.

== Foundation ==
=== The founders ===
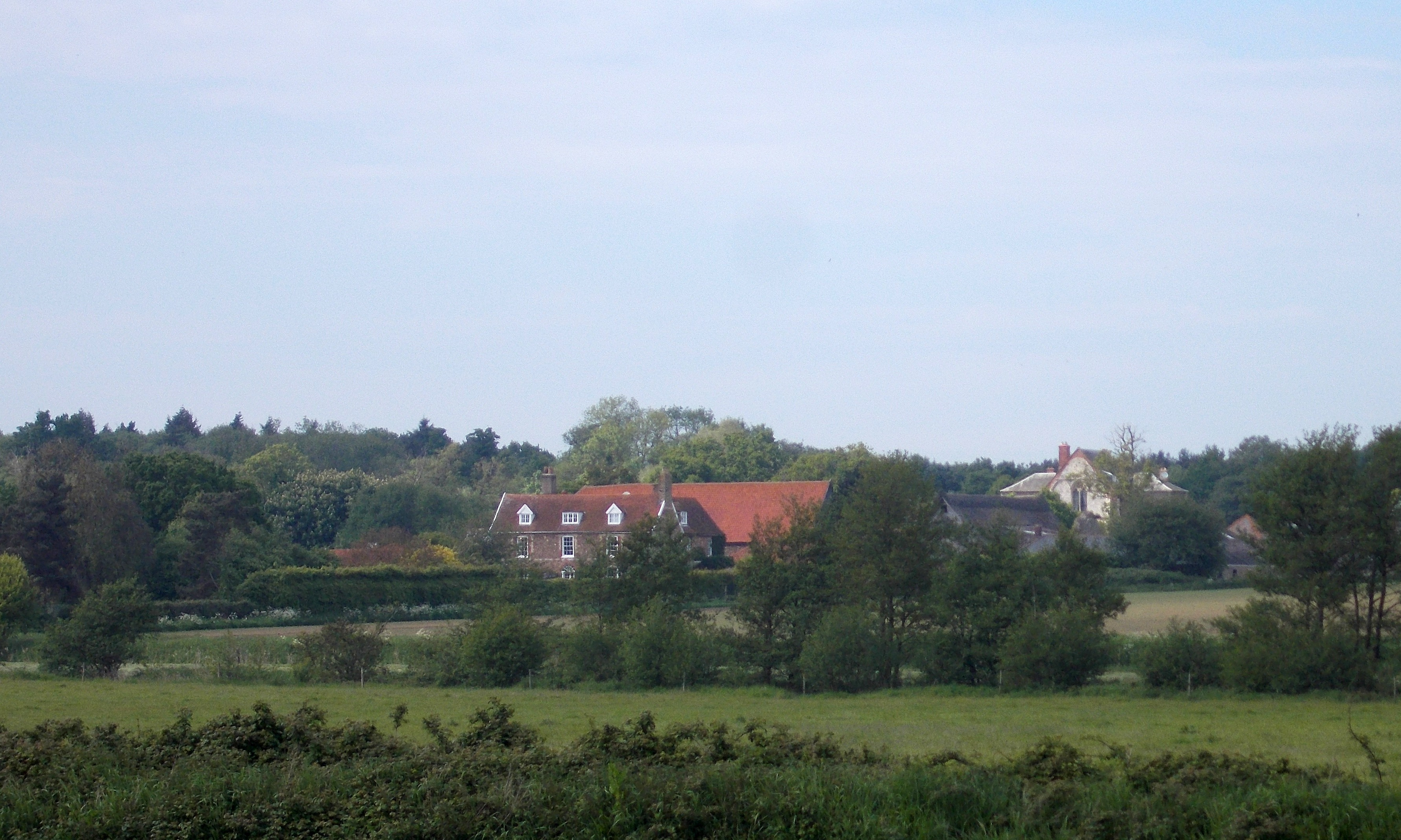
The Priory site from the south-east. The Gatehouse is at the north of the precinct: the church and convent buildings stood on the site of the farm

Butley Priory was founded at the time when nearby Orford Castle was being built by King Henry II to consolidate his power in Suffolk, a region dominated by Hugh Bigod, 1st Earl of Norfolk (died c. 1176). Ranulf de Glanvill, born in Stratford St Andrew, Sheriff of Yorkshire from 1163 to 1170, was loyal to the king, and married Bertha, daughter of Theobald de Valoines, Lord of Parham (fl. 1135). He became mentor to the King's son, John, and to Hubert Walter, son of his wife's sister Maud de Valoines. A kinsman, Bartholomew de Glanvill, was Sheriff of Norfolk and Suffolk from 1169, and Constable of Orford Castle. Hugh Bigod's widowed countess, Gundred, was the founder of Bungay Priory, and remarried to Roger de Glanvill; Ranulf witnessed the royal confirmation.

The site of Butley Priory, on rising ground overlooking wetland levels fed by waters tributary to the tidal Butley River, was an estate called Brochous, granted as maritagium (marriage endowment) to Bertha de Valoines by her father Theobald. This part of Butley lies in the Hundred of Plomesgate: at the Domesday Survey of 1086 it formed a manor (Carlton) held by one Hamo from Count Alan, presumably part of the de Valoines tenure which from Parham (in Plomesgate) owed service to the Honour of Richmond.

Ranulf founded the house in 1171 for 36 canons under a prior, for whom he selected Gilbert, formerly a precentor at Blythburgh Priory. Ranulf endowed it with the churches of Butley, Capel St Andrew, Bawdsey, Benhall, Farnham, Wantisden, Leiston and Aldringham, and a fourth part of the church of Glemham, together with various lands in Butley. Ranulf and Bertha also founded a leper hospital at West Somerton in Norfolk, for three lepers, dedicated to St Leonard, and placed it under the governance of Butley Priory.

Ranulf was Sheriff of Lancashire and Keeper of the Honour of Richmond at the time of the Revolt of 1173-74, and, following the defeat of Hugh Bigod at the Battle of Fornham in 1173, Glanvill surprised the Scots at the Battle of Alnwick in 1174 and made William the Lion the king's prisoner. Resuming office as Sheriff of Yorkshire in 1175, he became Chief Justiciar in 1180 (succeeding Richard de Luci). Butley seems to have held the advowson of St Olave Jewry with St Stephen Coleman Street, in London, from the Canons of St Paul's Cathedral by 1181. So it is shown in the accounts of Ralph de Diceto, who later made a grant of them to Butley, out of the fee of Ranulf's son-in-law Ralph de Ardern, acknowledged under the seal of Prior Gilbert.

Being granted the manor of Leiston, a few miles north of Butley, Ranulf founded the Premonstratensian Abbey there c. 1183 under Prior Robert, on a marshland isle near the sea. Among its endowments was the church of Knodishall, which with the assent of Gilbert and Robert was transferred to Butley Priory in exchange for their churches of Leiston and Aldringham. Ranulf died at the Siege of Acre in 1190, having divided his estates between his three daughters. In the descent of Bertha's maritagium to her heirs in blood, the patronage of the two convents passed with the manor of Benhall (in Plomesgate) to Matilda, and to her husband William de Auberville of Westenhanger in Kent.

=== The patronage, 1190-1300 ===
William and Matilda de Auberville founded Langdon Abbey, a Premonstratensian house near West Langdon, Kent, in 1192, as from Leiston Abbey: the foundation was given under the hand of Abbot Robert of Leiston and attested by Prior Gilbert of Butley. In 1194 Matilda's nephews, Thomas de Ardene and Ranulf fitz Robert, brought suit against the de Aubervilles for their share of Glanville's inheritance: William de Auberville died c. 1195, and his heirs became wards of Hubert Walter. In c. 1195 Butley elected its second prior, William (c. 1195-1213), a choice confirmed by Pope Celestinus III (1191-1199) who granted them the perpetual right of free election (as also to Leiston).

Philippa Golafre quitclaimed half the Hundred of Plomesgate to Hugh de Auberville, heir of William and Matilda, at Easter 1209. Hugh died c. 1212, whereupon William Briwere paid 1000 marks for custody of his lands, his heirs and their marriages. In 1213 Prior Robert received the advowson of the church of Weybread from Alan de Withersdale. Hugh's brother Robert de Auberville became a justiciar and constable of Hastings Castle during the 1220s. Joan de Auberville, wife of Ralph de Sunderland, held Benhall in 1225, but with the patronage of Butley Priory it descended to Hugh's son William. The Prior Adam (fl. 1219-1235), who carried through a painful dispute with the prioress of Campsey Priory in 1228-1230, probably hosted Henry III's visit in March 1235. William de Auberville attempted to assert rights of advowson at Butley Priory, but was successfully resisted, and came to a concord by which he quitclaimed advowson to the prior and convent and renounced rights of wardship during vacancy. At much the same time his kinsman Robert de Valoines did the same for Campsey Priory.

William died before 28 January 1248, and soon afterwards, 30 March to 1 April, the King visited both Leiston and Butley. William's daughter and heir Joan de Auberville married first (1248) Henry de Sandwich, and secondly (before June 1255) Nicholas de Crioll of Croxton Kerrial (died 1272), to whom she brought the Westenhanger estates. In dealing with her inheritance, at assizes of 1258 they claimed from Joan's mother Isabel two parts of the manor of Benhall with its appurtenances. In this interval were Priors Peter (fl. 1251) and Hugh (fl. 1255), and after it came Prior Walter (by 1260-1268). Butley received an advowson in Essex in 1261 from Robert de Stuteville, and another in Norfolk from Lady Cassandra Baynard in 1268.

Nicholas de Crioll (who with Bertram de Criol had served the king in Gascony in 1248-49 and 1253-54 and was entrusted with the Cinque Ports and other commands in Kent in 1263) gave Benhall with its appurtenances to his son Nicholas the younger, and consented when the heir (in minority) settled it in lifetime dower upon his bride Margery, daughter of Sir Gilbert Pecche. Prior Robert, who succeeded Walter, had given way to the troubled Prior Thomas by 1277/78. Margery was living when in c. 1290 her husband gave the manor and its appurtenances to Guy Ferre the younger, who for this concord gave to de Crioll a Sore-hawk. Nicholas de Crioll the younger, who died in 1303, retained his patronage of Langdon Abbey.

== The Priory church and cloister ranges ==
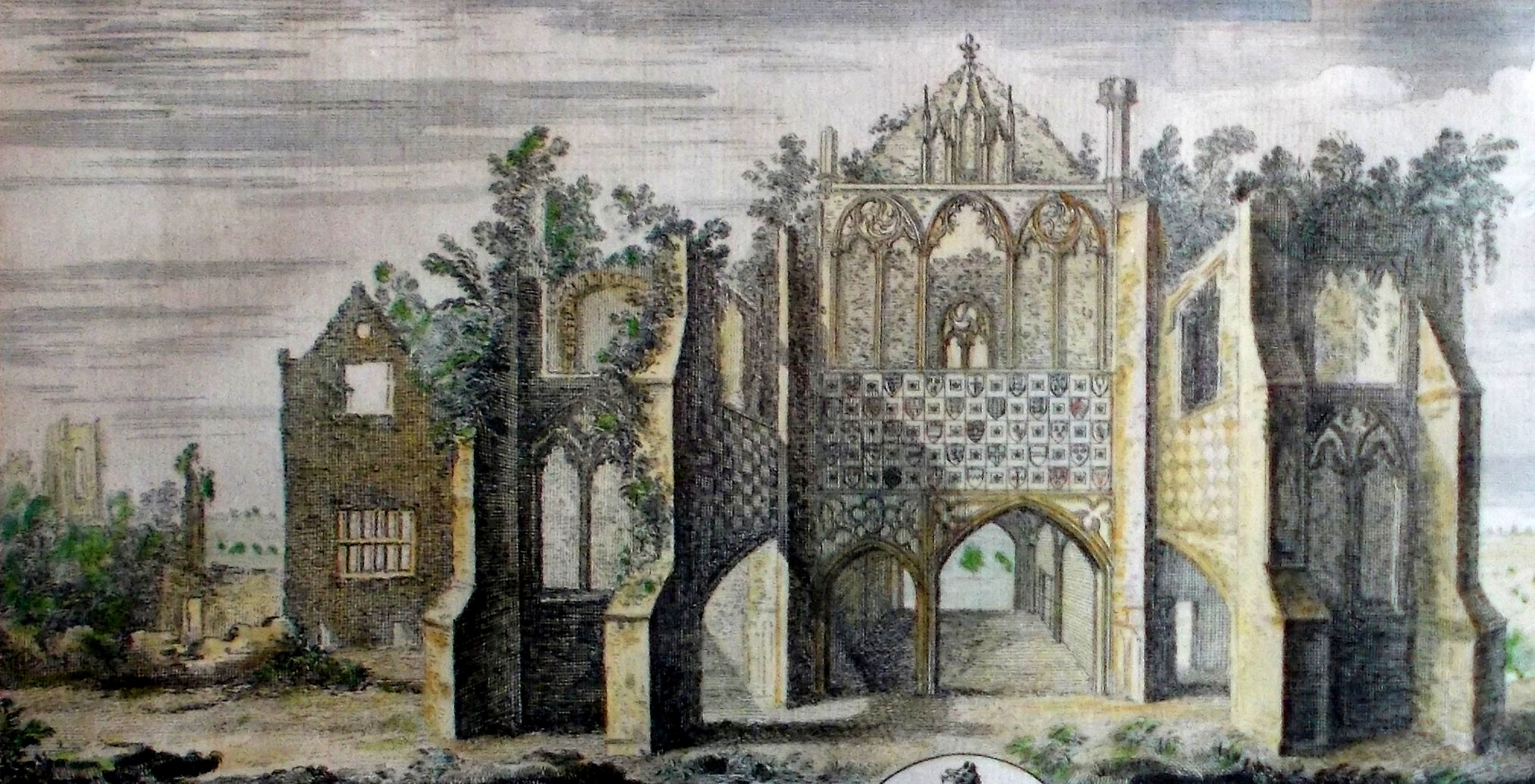
Buck engraving (1738), detail: priory church tower far left

Excavations in 1931-1933 in and around the farm, led by J.N.L. Myres, revealed much about the layout and phases of development of the priory church and claustral buildings, which had been on a grand scale. The rectangular area now occupied by farm buildings was the site of the central complex and contains some standing remains of the Refectory or Frater on the south side, and of the Reredorter (which stood apart from the east claustral range) on the east side. The central tower of the priory church was still standing when an engraving of the Gatehouse was made in 1738, and sizeable parts of the church's eastern works remained (and were illustrated by Isaac Johnson) before being removed in c. 1805.

In addition to foundations and buried walls, the excavators found a large number of decorative tiles of various kinds. They belonged to different periods of building. Of special note were several examples of 13th century "embossed" tiles, about 5 inches square and an inch thick, with striking designs of symmetrical interlacing foliage and winged heraldic animals under clear green glaze. These had been pressed from moulds shaping the images in rounded bas-relief. Others of later types, some still in their original floor positions, were of pressed heraldic, geometric or foliate designs in a red clay matrix with white ball clay infilling, or in some cases painted in slip, before glazing. They show that the convent church and cloisters were not visually austere. The early embossed tiles have been found at related sites including Orford, Leiston Abbey and Campsey Priory, and the later types are also characteristically East Anglian. The Butley tiles are a core reference collection in developing knowledge of this subject.

=== The priory church ===
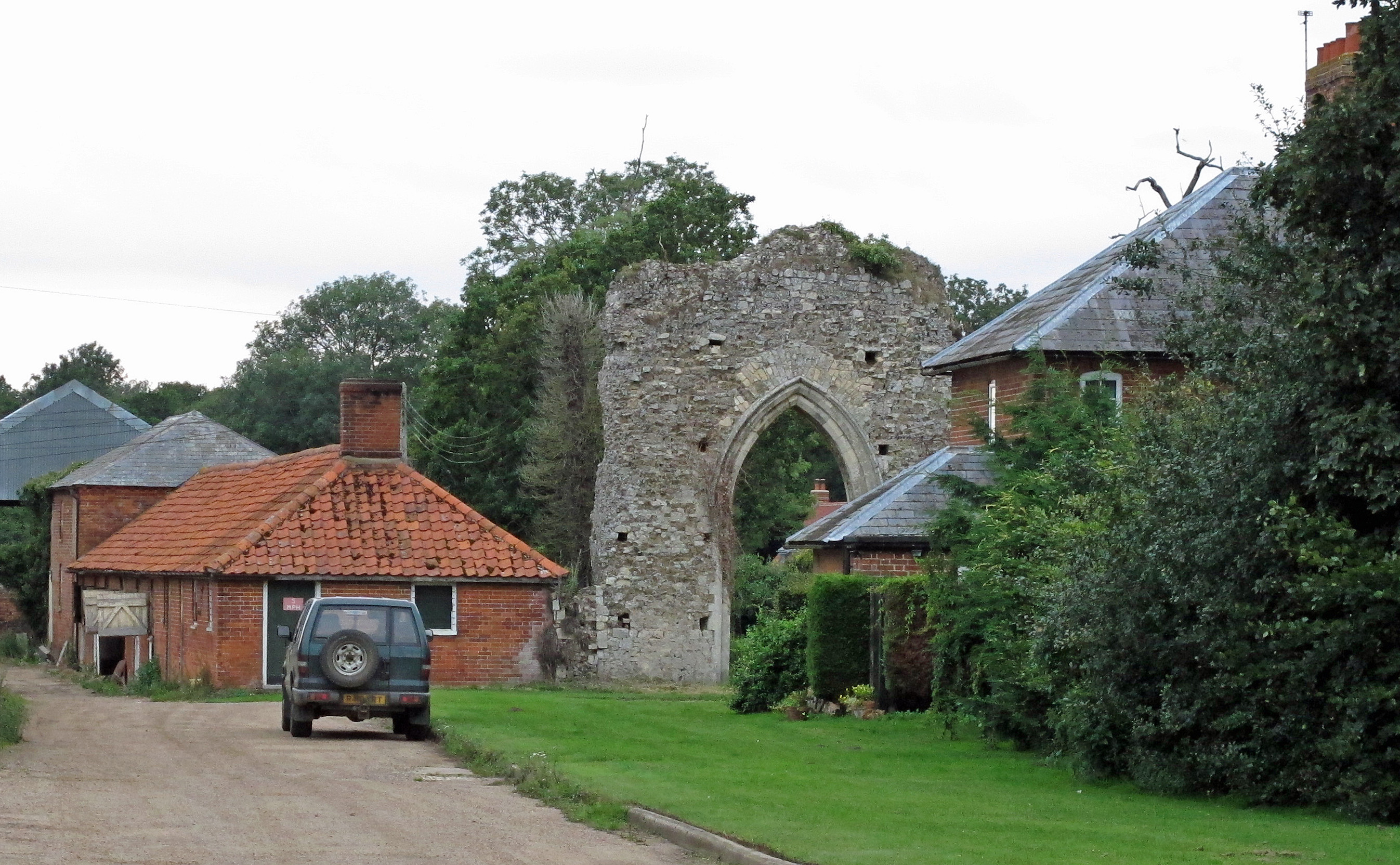
The church ruins among farm buildings.

Myres believed that the plan of the priory complex was laid out in the founding phase, but that the only masonry construction belonging to Ranulf's time was represented by the footings of the original church, later rebuilt. With a large west doorway, its nave was 132 feet long and 34 feet wide, without aisles, opening into a crossing with north and south transepts each about 28 feet square. This stood across the open area just north of the old farm buildings. The presbytery, also without aisles, extended some distance eastwards across the present farm track towards the cottages and lane opposite, but later rebuilding and digging had removed its footprint.

In the second phase of patronage, c. 1190-1240, the church was almost entirely rebuilt. The eastern end of the church was enlarged to some 70 feet east of the crossing, probably forming five bays, with choir aisles, probably of four bays, to north and south. The north transept was extended 12 feet northwards, and small outer chapels were added to the east side of both transepts. The nave was rebuilt with 10-foot aisles on both north and south sides, the eight columns of the nine nave arcades resting on the former nave footings. New substantial piers were built for the crossing, no doubt to support the tower above. The west wall was completely rebuilt two feet east of its former position. A turret staircase is thought to have existed at the north-west corner. The church was thus some 235 feet in overall length.

During the 14th century the choir aisles were rebuilt to the full width of the transepts, and to a length of five bays. The east walls of the transepts were replaced, each containing a single arch (one of which survives). A beautifully carved piscina of this date, thought to have come from the priory church, is preserved in the Gatehouse. The south choir aisle contained a number of important burials in stone coffins.

=== The cloister and ranges ===
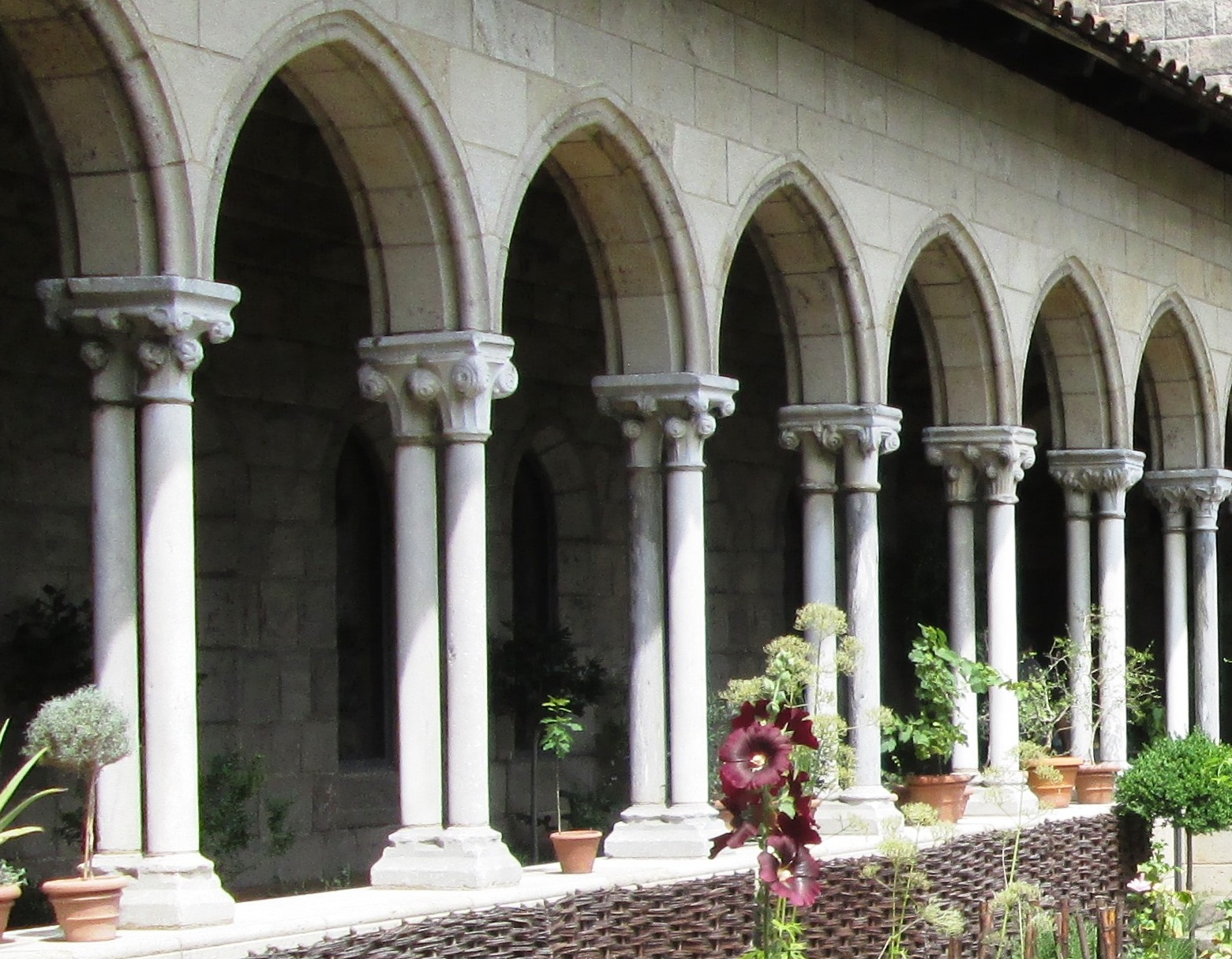
Twin column cloister arcade, c. 1200 (Bonnefont, France: Cloisters Museum), for comparison

The first construction of the stone conventual buildings took place in the years of the de Auberville patronage, c.1190-1240. The nave of the church formed the north side of the cloister. Myres observed that a cloister of 98 feet square had originally been envisaged, but was curtailed by ten feet on the north side to make room for the addition of the south aisle of the nave. Butley's early 13th-century cloister walkways had open arcading, formed by a low wall with pairs of detached Purbeck marble columns set transversely upon it with double capitals and bases (over 16 inches breadth) ornamented with carving of stiff-leaved foliage, supporting a series of equal arches. This opened from all sides onto a central garth 71 feet from east to west and 62 feet north to south. These arcades were replaced in the 14th century by walls which probably supported glazed windows, both for greater comfort and because the purbeck marble had apparently deteriorated where exposed to the weather. They were again rebuilt on the east and south sides at a later date.

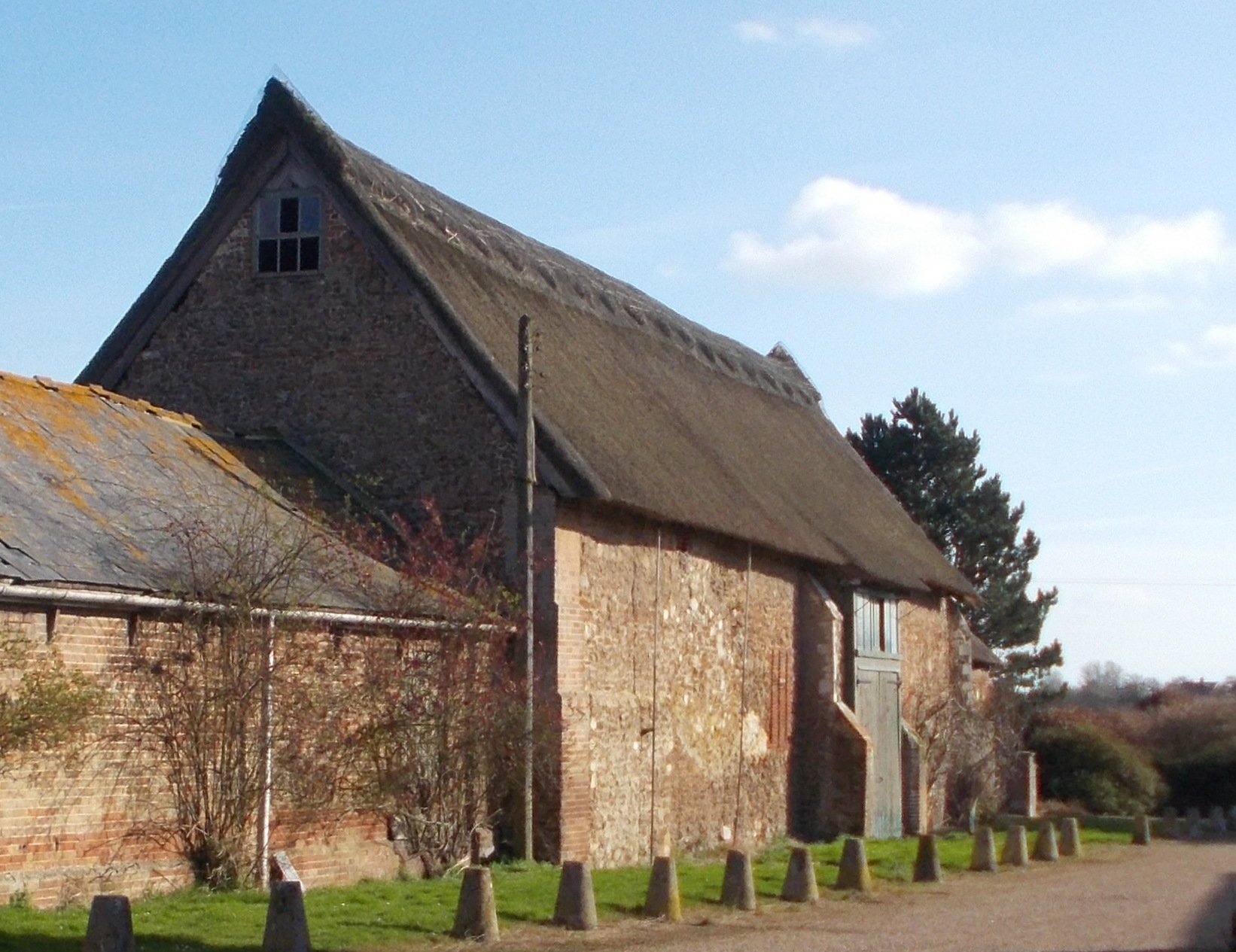
Remains of the Priory Reredorter, from north-west.

On the east side of the cloister, running south from the south transept of the church, was the sacristy or vestry; then the chapter house, internally 48 feet long, extending back across the present farm path, and having a frontage of about 20 feet onto the cloister walk. To its south was the dormitory with an undercroft of some 99 feet, and a day stair descending into the cloister walk. None of this now stands above ground. Many of the interior walls at ground level were probably of 14th century construction. From its south end a passageway ran east to the north end of the reredorter, a separate building originally 60 feet by 18 feet. A thatched barn to the east of the farm path incorporates its standing walls, thrown in with that part of the passageway which stood at its north end.

On the south side of the cloister was the Refectory range, 22 feet wide and at least 70 feet long, now represented by a great barn which incorporates some of its masonry. At its north-western corner is a scar, to the full height of the eaves, showing where the lost western range adjoined it. At its north end the western range was built integrally with the south aisle of the nave, showing that it, too was of the early 13th century construction. This was presumably the cellarer's range, and had included a porch or gateway in its west wall.

=== The wharf ===
The priory stood on the margin of open levels extending towards the tidal Butley River, which is now strongly embanked. Along the south side of the priory enclosure, where the ground slopes down to the level, a creek was modified and brought into use as a navigable waterway. Excavations revealed a massive 60-foot long wall, braced by three buttresses, forming an embankment, to one end of which a roadway led from the direction of the monastery buildings to the water's edge. Beyond this was a further wooden revetment and evidence of a landing stage or platform for storage buildings. Investigations showed that it had continued in use long after the closure of the monastery before being deliberately filled in. The channel (now no more than a narrow stream) and its dock served the priory both for drainage and transport. The management of a partially wetland environment and its resources, and access to water communication routes, were the practical benefits of its marshy seclusion: the liminal nature of the landscape had both material and spiritual advantages. The monastic fishponds were in the north-western part of the site.

== The Priory Gatehouse ==
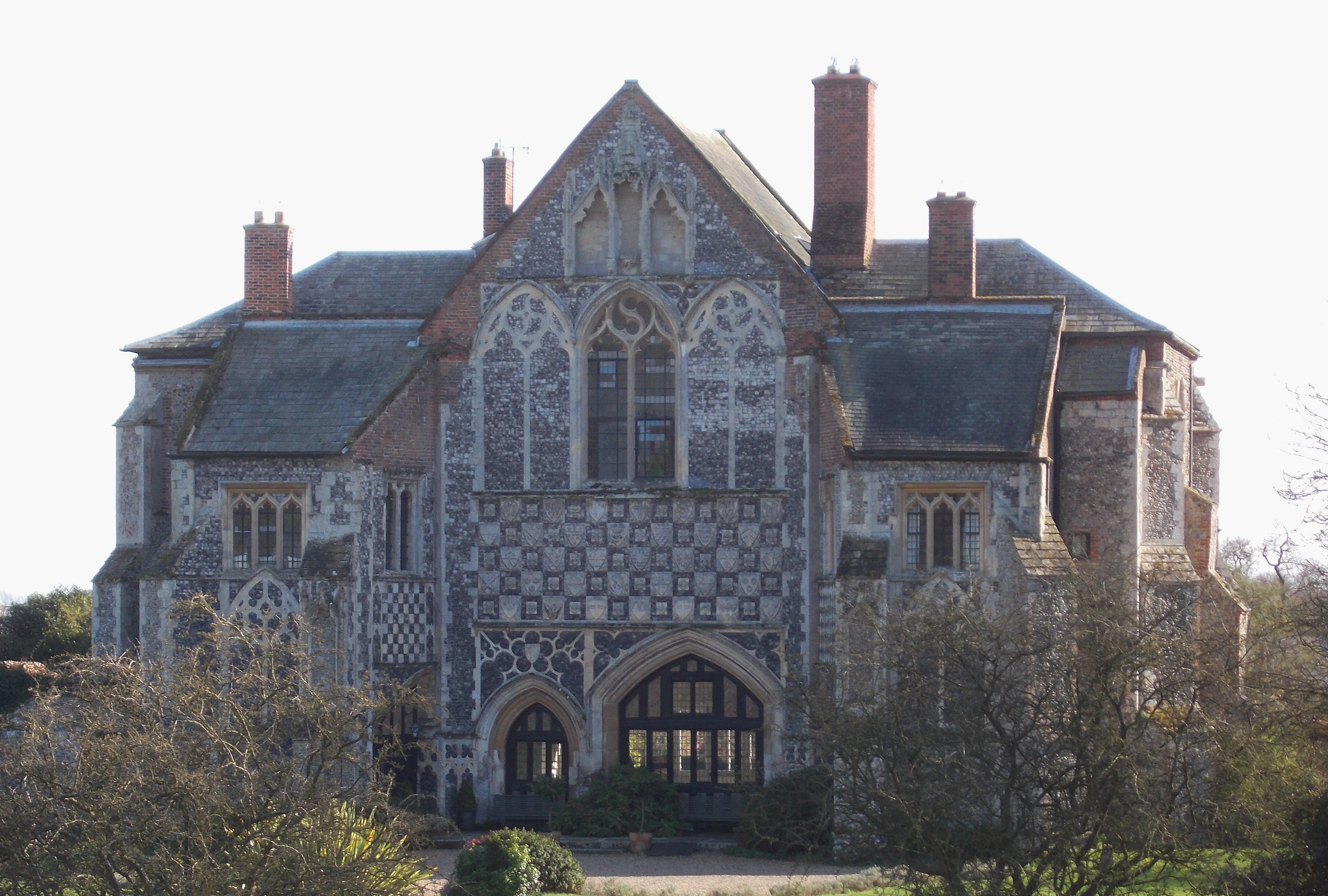
The Gatehouse north front

Standing centrally on the priory's northern precinct boundary, the gatehouse was built in the early 14th century to provide a grand entrance and to accommodate important visitors. Substantially original, it is called one of the finest examples of Decorated Gothic architecture in Suffolk, and one of the most complete and interesting monastic entrances surviving. Its exuberant flint flushwork is the first blossoming of that technique, later so widespread in East Anglian religious architecture, and its heraldic display was ambitious in content and architecturally innovative. The impressive rib-vaulted central entrance passage and side chambers dictated the need for large external buttresses. A portal between the temporal and cloistered worlds, the Gatehouse was in its time a prestigious addition to the priory, and remains a monument to the priory itself and to the taste and resources of its patron. It also attracted some distinguished visitors.

=== The architecture ===
The gateway consists of a central block of about 31 by 37 feet (external), the whole internal space (some 22 by 30 feet) forming a rib-vaulted passageway of two bays running longitudinally with a great chamber above. The north (external) entrance has a larger arch to the west for visitors riding on horseback and for vehicles, and a smaller entry beside it for pedestrians, and had wooden gates. The south entrance has a single central arch. The north and south walls rise to high gables. This structure is flanked by two equal blocks some 23 feet east and west (external) containing side chambers about 18 feet square internally, with rib vaults supporting domed brickwork ceilings, and with upper rooms. They stand to the north: the south end of the central block projects. Their walls were probably crenellated and their roofs crossed into the central roof. The central passage floor level was about 6 inches below present ground level, and that of the side chambers lower. Two smaller tower blocks some 13 foot square (external) extend to the north, each with one side wall angled out to flare away from the piers of the gateway arches. These gave admission through two half-arches braced against the piers. Very large angled buttresses project from every external corner of the building and rise to the upper storey. All is of one construction.

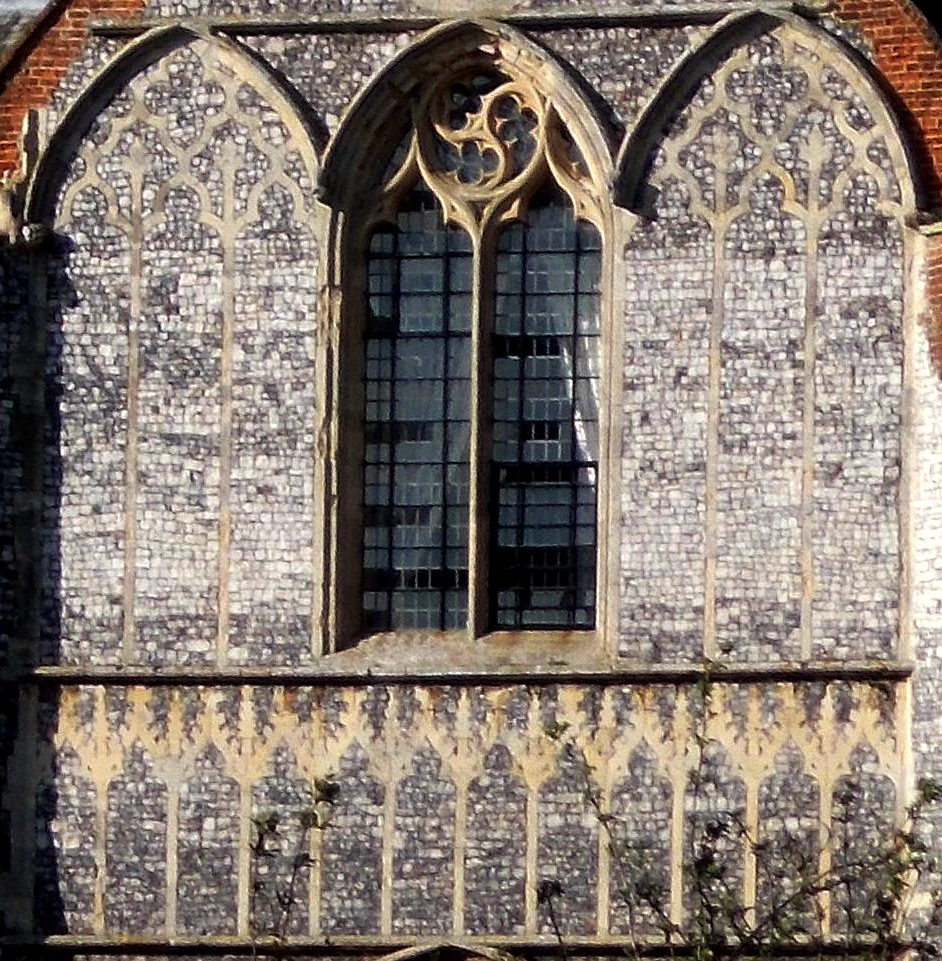
Detail of flushwork tracery on the south front

The exterior decorative work covers the whole of the north and south gabled frontages and the faces of the north towers, in a dramatic scheme integral to the proportions of the building. The upper chamber over the main entrance has on both fronts a single tall arched window of pierced stone tracery: a central mullion branches to form two equal cusped ogee arches supporting a circular member in the head of the main window arch, intersected by a sigmoid curve in the north side and by a triskele device in the southern window. Externally this appears (on both fronts) as the central window in an arcade of three equal arches filling the breadth of the wall. The outer arches are executed in blind flushwork tracery: those of the north front both have a fourfold division of the upper circle, but with opposing or mirrored rotation. On the south front the flushwork tracery represents windows with paired mullions branching into a lattice of cusped quatrefoils above. The tracery is reserved in freestone and infilled with carpets of neatly squared flints which shimmer in sunlight. Beneath this the south front has a shallow flushwork frieze of cusped arches or canopies with crocketed pinnacles, and in the gable above is the imitation of a rose window of wheel type.

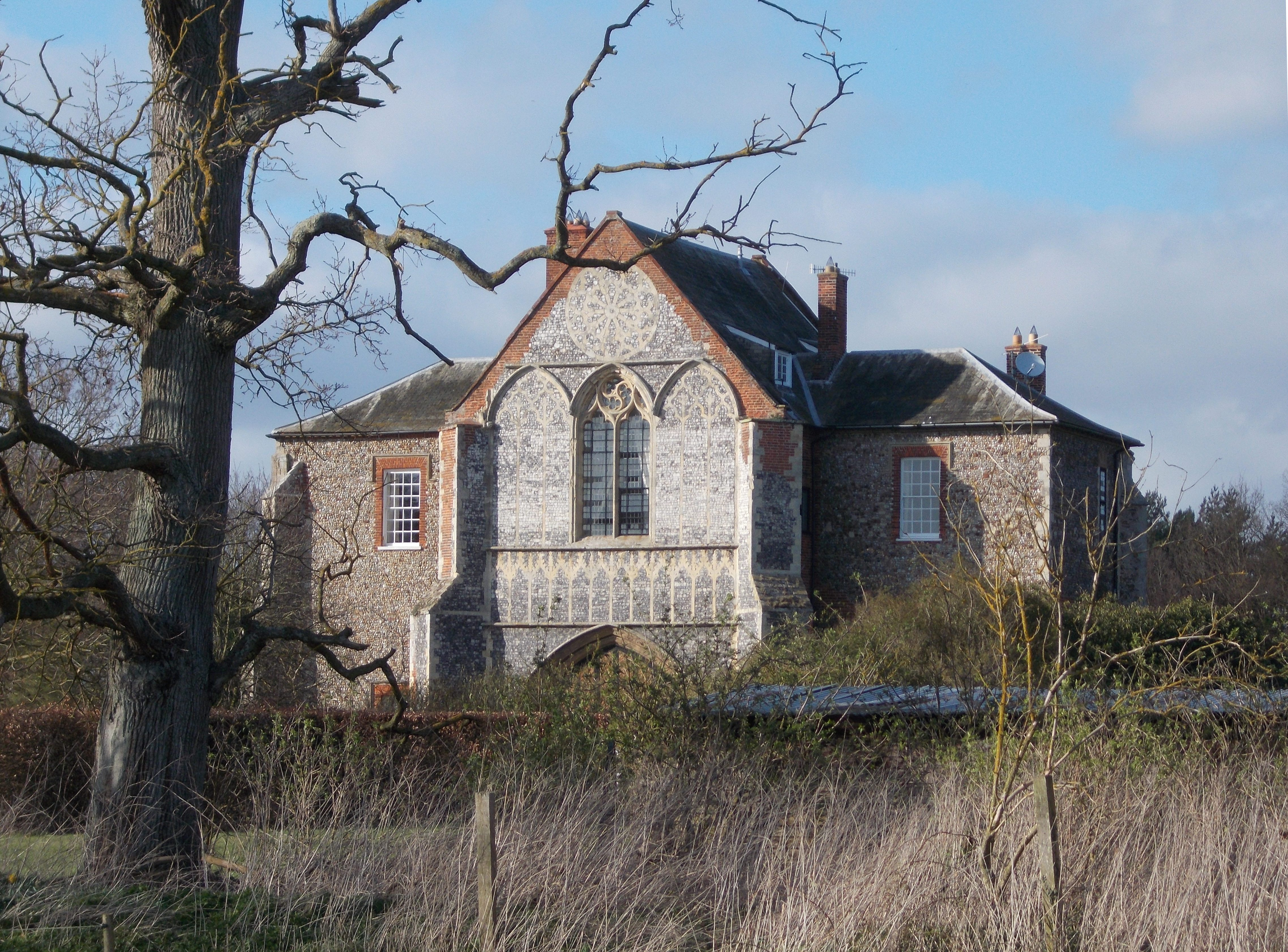
The Gatehouse from the south-east

The north towers beside the entrance also have blind tracery, and the two inner buttresses, which face forward, have niches to contain statues which are lost. A figure is shown in the west niche in Buck's engraving. These linked thematically with sculptures in the three niches set up in the north gable, the central figure there presumably being St Mary (to whom the priory was dedicated). Framed by this devotional tableau, the armorial display spreads across the whole width of wall above the entry archways. In five rows each of fourteen chequered squares, 35 shields of arms carved in high relief, with whimsical figures and grotesques crowding into their surrounds, alternate with carved fleurs-de-lys set into flushwork panels. Sir James Mann identified the upper row as showing (1) The Holy Roman Empire, (2) France, (3) St Edmund's Bury, (4) Christ's Passion, (5) England (before it became quartered with France in 1340), (6) Léon and Castile, and (7) Hurtshelve. In the second and third rows are English baronial families and in the fourth and fifth are East Anglian gentry. The chequered arrangement is echoed in flushwork on the slanting sides of the adjacent towers, laid upright to the east and as lozenges to the west. Caröe noted the distinctively French carving of the string course above the heraldry.

The final component of the decorative scheme occupied the space above the pedestrian arch, the lesser of the two entrance gates. In a field of flushwork tracery, a cinquefoil surrounds a single carved presentation of the arms of Sir Guy Ferre the younger. Where these arms are recited in the Galloway Roll (c.1300) it is specified that they are for Guy Ferre "the nephew". The baton is for difference from another Guy Ferre who bore the plain coat, and died probably in 1303.

=== The patron ===
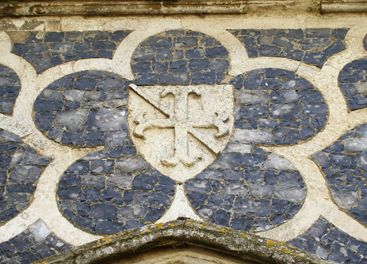
Arms of Sir Guy Ferre (d.1323) displayed at Butley Priory gatehouse.

Sir Guy Ferre the younger acquired the manor of Benhall with its patronage of Butley Priory and Leiston Abbey in or soon after 1290 (confirmed 1294), from Sir Nicholas de Crioll. He had trouble with poachers there in 1292. He had held this title (as from the Honour of Eye) for more than 10 years when de Crioll's death in 1303 prompted his widow Margery (daughter of Sir Gilbert Pecche (died 1291), patron of Barnwell Priory), who remarried, to assert her right in dower, and she for herself and her heirs quitclaimed it to Sir Guy for £100 in 1304. Between 1292 and 1303 the priory asserted its rights in its benefice in the City of London, the advowson of St Stephen, Coleman Street.

The early career of Sir Guy Ferre, which began in accompanying Prince Edmund to the Holy Land in 1271, and entering service in the household of the dowager Queen Eleanor of Provence, to whom he became steward and lastly executor, is usually taken to refer to Sir Guy the elder. It is uncertain whether he, or the younger Sir Guy, was the magister to Prince Edward, or who in 1295 was "staying continually in the company of Edward the king's son by the king's special order." Guy the younger, who was not of English birth, was in Gascony with Edward I in 1286-89 while the king was reorganizing the administration of his Duchy of Aquitaine. Edward granted him the remainder of Gestingthorpe, Essex, held by Gilbert Pecche, in 1289, and in 1298-99 he served as royal Lieutenant of the Duchy, with possession and use of its Seal. Following Edward II's accession, from March 1308 to September 1309 as Seneschal of Gascony he implemented mandates to resist Philip IV's subversion of English rule. At this time, Ascensiontide 1308, he associated his wife Elianore in the Benhall title, with named remainders in default of issue.

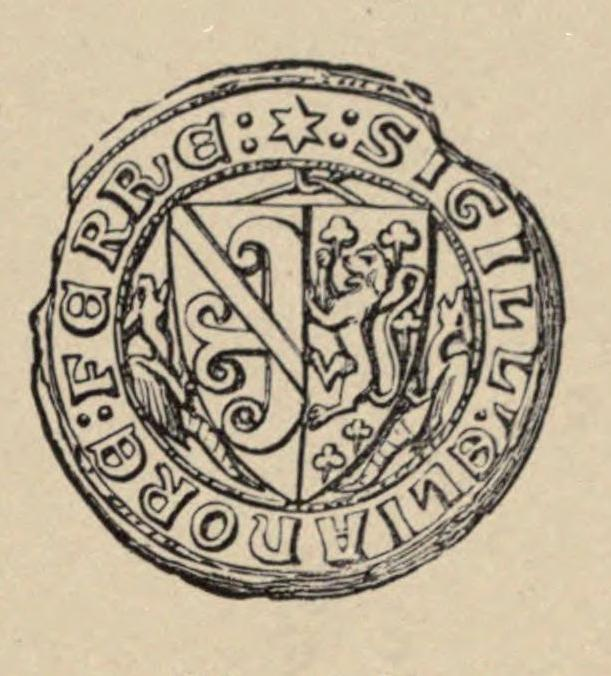
Seal of Elianore Ferre, arms of Ferre impaling Mountender

Sir Guy became a trusted ducal commissioner through the Process of Périgueux (a negotiation to end French encroachment in Gascony), though recalled for some months in 1312 to help release the king from the Ordinances of 1311. Following the murder of the Seneschal John Ferrers in late 1312 Ferre was instructed to remain in Gascony to invest and assist his successor. A year later he returned to England, apparently for three years. Gilbert Pecche, Margery de Crioll's half-brother, was Seneschal in Gascony when, in 1317, Ferre was sent to John of Brittany, king's Lieutenant in Gascony, then negotiating for the ransom of Aymer de Valence. In 1320 he was bidden to assume a place in the royal retinue at Amiens, where Edward paid liege homage to Philip V for the Duchy of Aquitaine.

Sir Guy died without heir male in 1323 and (as stipulated in the 1289 grant of Gestingthorpe) his manors, except his entails of 1308, passed by reversion or escheat. But as Elianore Ferre held Benhall with him jointly, it remained wholly to her for her life under the Honour of Eye. An example of her personal seal survives, attached to a document issued from Benhall in 1348. Her name inscription surrounds a shield bearing arms of Guy Ferre the younger impaled with a coat blazoned by Robert Glover for "Mountender", and by Charles Segoing (a French herald of the 17th century) for a family of the township of Montendre in the Saintonge frontier of English Aquitaine. Two wyverns support the shield, as in the Butley armorials.

== Priors and patrons, 1300-1483 ==
Between 1290 and 1300 Prior Thomas strove to retain the priory's control of its house at West Somerton. Richard de Iakesle, Prior 1303-1307, seems to have been appointed directly by Bishop John Salmon (a commissioner in Gascony with Guy Ferre and John of Brittany), and two others served briefly after him. The canons' right of free election was tested with the appointment of William de Geytone as prior in 1311 by a negotiated agreement. In his time, in 1322, St Olave and St Stephen in the Jewry, the priory's London parish, was appropriated to the priory by Bishop Gravesend. A distinguished prior, Geytone presided (with John of Cheddington, Prior of Dunstable) at the Augustinian General Chapter in Northampton in 1325. This was an important occasion on which the chapter's acts and ordinances were entirely reformed, and the role of the diffinitores in their governance was established. They also presided at Huntingdon in 1328. He governed Butley Priory for 21 years until his death in 1332: the stone indent of his memorial brass, with a crocketed canopy, is preserved in Hollesley church, and shows him mitred.

=== de Ufford patrons ===
The canons elected Alexander de Stratford to succeed, but he died a year later, and in his place they chose Matthew de Pakenham. Eleanor Ferre, whom they had not consulted, protested her rights to the canons and was forcefully resisted. She brought a petition against them but was referred to the Common Law. John of Eltham, Earl of Cornwall then held the reversion of Benhall (as of his Honour of Eye), and held it at his death in 1336. In 1337 King Edward III granted it to Robert de Ufford upon his creation as 1st Earl of Suffolk. Eleanor Ferre retained her title to Benhall until her death in 1349, when the reversion to Robert de Ufford came into effect. His patronage of Leiston Abbey (as it had been held by de Crioll and de Ferre) was specifically confirmed in 1351. Matthew remained prior at Butley until his resignation in 1353.

Robert de Ufford, a de Pecche descendant, gave his attention to the rebuilding of Leiston Abbey on its present site. Through his mother, Cecily de Valoines, the de Ufford family interest centred especially upon Campsey Priory, where Robert and his son William de Ufford, 2nd Earl of Suffolk were buried in 1369 and 1382 respectively. The Butley and Leiston patronage was then granted, with Benhall, by Richard II to Michael de la Pole, 1st Earl of Suffolk, and after his fall in 1388 was regranted to Michael de la Pole the younger in 1398. Here Butley's right of free election of its prior seems to have expired. A tradition exists that the third Michael de la Pole, who fell at Agincourt in 1415, was buried in Butley priory church.

The period from 1374 to 1483 was, in any case, spanned by the long tenures of only three priors, William de Halesworth (1374-1410), William Randeworth (1410-1444) and William Poley (1444-1483). In 1398 the right was granted to the prior and his successors to use episcopal insignia, Mitre, ring and pastoral staff, by Papal privilege, and permissions to hold benefices were granted to certain canons. William de Halesworth was a diffinitor at the Augustinian chapter at Northampton in 1404.

=== St Stephen Colman Street ===
Between 1430 and 1457 a concerted effort was made by wealthy London parishioners, apparently on behalf of the Worshipful Company of Leathersellers, to detach the northern part of the priory's City parish of St Olave's and St Stephen in the Jewry to form a new parish centred upon St Stephen's (as many had long supposed it to be), and to deprive the priory of the endowments and advowson. This was supported in several judgements by the City authorities which Prior Randeworth was unable to resist. Prior Poley brought new energy to the cause. By his efforts, in 1457 the challenges to the priory's legitimate rights were overturned, and its authority in St Stephen's was confirmed, when the ecclesiastical authorities determined that the new parish (St Stephen Coleman Street) should be constituted as a perpetual vicarage. It was incorporated formally by King Edward IV in 1466, who reformed its chantries to include daily prayers for Richard, Duke of York, Edmund, Earl of Rutland and Richard Nevill, Earl of Salisbury.

Through these events distrust arose between the priory and the parish. The 1457 judgement, which was arbitrated and decreed in person by Archbishop Bourchier, Thomas Kempe Bishop of London, William Waynflete Bishop of Winchester, Sir John Fortescue Chief Justice, and the doctors of both laws Robert Stillington and John Druell (prebendary and treasurer of St Paul's), bound both the priory and the parish representatives to desist from further dispute. Butley retained its rights in St Olave's and St Stephen's (rooted in the Diceto grant and the de Ardern fee), now as separate parishes, until the Dissolution. William Leek as vicar of St Stephen's was dynamic in reforming the parish from 1459 to 1478, and the church was favoured by prominent early Tudor merchants, not least the Mayor Thomas Bradbury (died 1510). Richard Kettyll, the priory's last presentation (appointed in 1530), saw the parish into the age of Elizabeth and died in 1562.

== The Tudor priory ==
=== The community ===
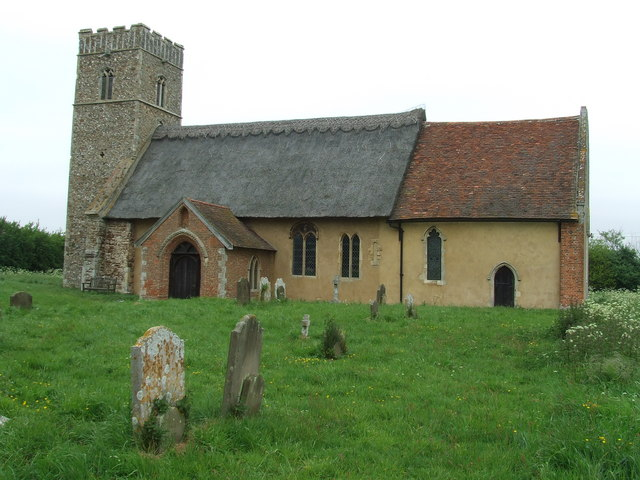
Butley parish church

The last 50 years of the priory are unusually well-documented. The names of the canons themselves, and their observations and complaints about the management of the convent, can be followed in a series of Visitations by the Bishops of Norwich, commencing in 1492 with that of Bishop James Goldwell. Thomas Framlyngham or (Framyngham) (1483-1503) was then prior, with 14 canons. Framyngham ruled at his own pleasure, and was given to entertaining his wealthy friends and relatives. Between this inspection and the next, by Bishop Richard Nykke in 1514, there were various developments. Edmund Lychefeld, Bishop of Chalcedon (a titular see, and suffragan to the Bishop of Norwich) was elected prior in 1503, but died in the following year and was succeeded by Robert Brommer in 1506. The will of William Pakeman, a Yeoman waiter at the priory, was proved in 1504, one of several informative testaments to benefit the inmates.

Lychefeld's sub-prior was William Woodebrige, a canon in 1494, to whom is credited authorship of the Chronicle of the priory which survives for the years 1510-1535. In 1509 Prior Robert committed suicide by hanging himself in a house in Ipswich, and his body was buried in the churchyard of Butley parish church, which was served by the canons. A new prior being needed, William Woodebrige was chosen by the canons, but Bishop Nykke overrode this and appointed Augustine Rivers alias Clarke (then prior of Woodbridge Priory) in his place. He also gave order for Prior Robert's body to be removed from the churchyard. After a second interment near the churchyard boundary the remains were finally buried in the road leading from the priory to Butley Street. In 1514, when the priory was in debt and its buildings in some disrepair, Woodebrige could report that three masses a day were sung by note.

=== Prior Rivers ===
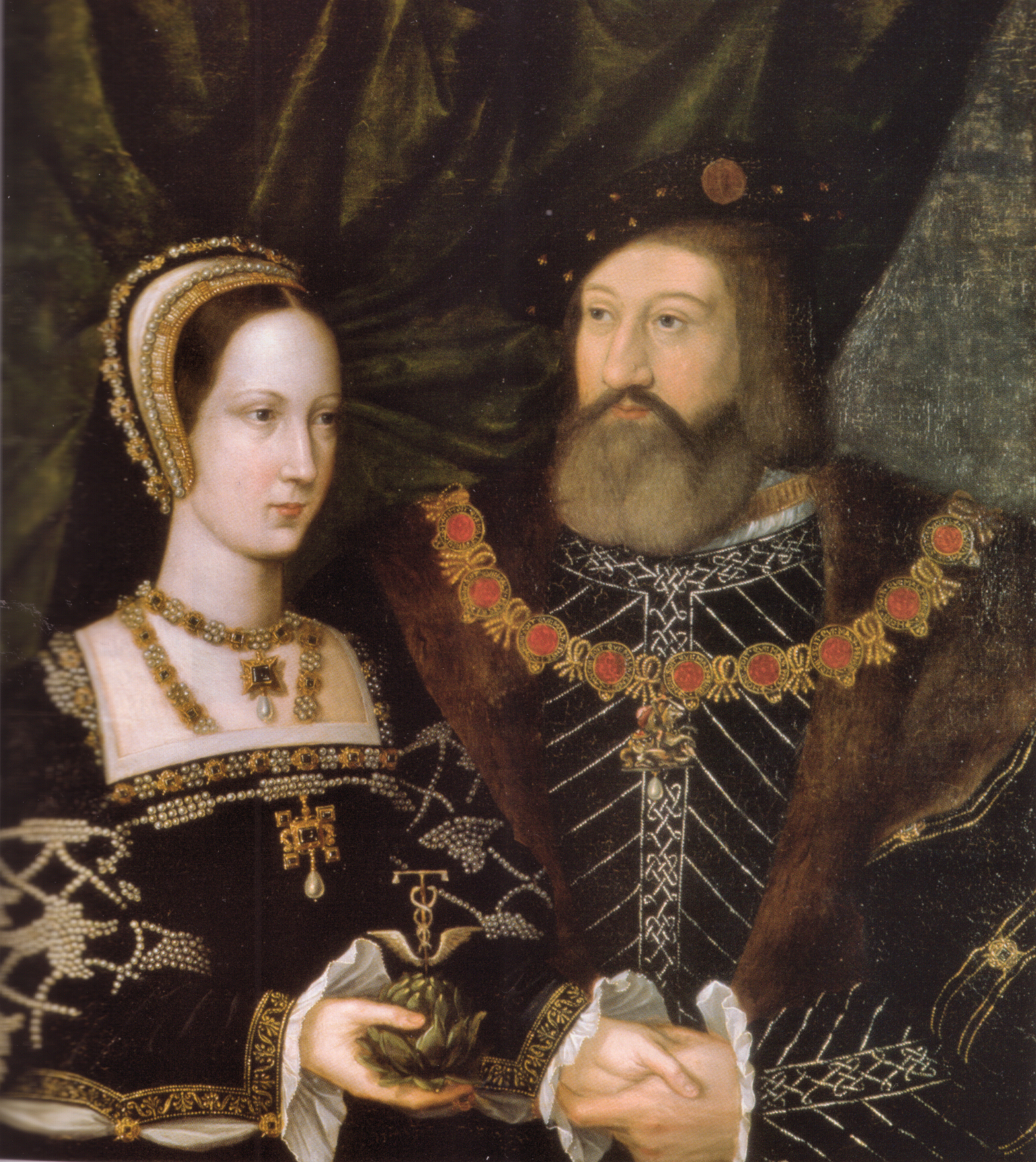
Mary Tudor, Queen of France and Charles Brandon

Augustine Rivers (Prior, 1509-1528) spent a substantial amount of his own money on repairs to the buildings, and cleared the priory's debt, though the canons complained that the food was not very good, the infirmary was not maintained, and the roofs of the church and refectory leaked when it rained. At the 1520 Visitation there were only 11 canons, and they were reminded that they must remain silent in the refectory, dormitory and cloister. By 1526 the numbers had increased to 16 (including the prior) but the drains were becoming blocked, and the roofs still leaked.

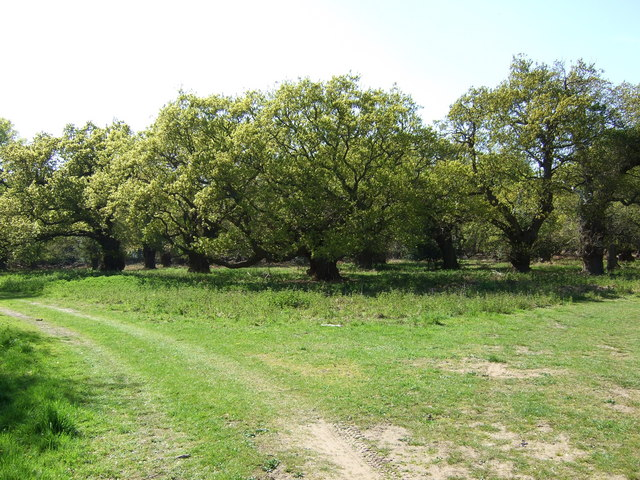
Ancient oaks in Staverton Park

However this priorate was particularly memorable for its distinguished guests, who came to enjoy the surrounding countryside. Soon after her marriage to Charles Brandon (1st Duke of Suffolk), Mary Tudor stayed at the priory in 1515/16, with her husband in 1518, and again in 1519, always in late September. She stayed for two months in summer 1527, and in the following year she and the Duke went fox-hunting in nearby Staverton Park (an ancient oakland deer-park), where they dined and had musicians playing. Staverton had been leased to the priory in 1517 by the second Duke of Norfolk, at whose funeral at Thetford Priory in 1524 Prior Rivers in his pontifical vestments celebrated the Mass for St Mary. Thomas Howard the third Duke, with Lord Willoughby, stayed in 1526 for a hunting expedition and took the prior out with them. Lord Willoughby died a month later.

The Duke dined once more with Rivers in 1527 and arranged the sale of Staverton Park to the convent, but the prior died late in 1528, soon after Queen Mary's picnic in the woods, and was buried in the priory church. The canons unanimously chose Thomas Sudborne alias Manning, the priory's Cellarer, to succeed him. However, letters to prevent an election and for sequestration arrived from Thomas Wolsey, and it was necessary for Bishop Nykke to reply that the choice had already been made, and to advocate Manning's installation, while submitting the decision to the Cardinal. The canons themselves, headed by William Woodebrige, composed a letter to Wolsey to the same effect. On his further consideration the appointment was confirmed in February 1529, as the Staverton transaction came to completion. It was therefore Prior Thomas who welcomed the Duke of Norfolk, his son Henry Howard and their entourage to dinner at the priory in July 1529.

=== The last prior ===
Soon after his election Manning was instituted to the vicarage of nearby Chillesford. He was from the outset in Cromwell's sights and alert to political change, and took care for himself. The condition and morale of the priory at the Visitation of 1532 was not good. William Woodebrige stated that the religious observations were performed, but the canons had numerous complaints. The prior had better victuals than the brethren, and his servants were rude to them. He held all the offices but did not present the accounts. The roofs of the presbytery and transepts, and the ceiling of the chapter house, were decaying; arrangements for the infirm were inadequate, there was no physician or preceptor, and they were suffering from cold. The brethren grumbled and spoke badly of one another in no spirit of kindness. A monk had been ordained by fraud. There were several injunctions for reform.

Having assisted Cromwell over a land-dispute, Manning was chosen (the first) Bishop of Ipswich, suffragan to the Bishop of Norwich, in March 1536, in preference to the Abbot of Leiston. After the smaller monasteries were condemned, and the rising which ensued, in December he sent a handsome gift of swans and other fowl to Cromwell to redress some suspicion of dissent, hoping for royal confirmation for the priory's survival. The Duke of Suffolk's men now treated him more abruptly. Three months later he failed to attend a meeting with Cromwell, pleading sickness, and in November 1537 he lent a rent-roll for some of the priory's possessions to Thomas Wriothesley. On 1 March 1538 he and eight of the twelve canons of Butley signed a voluntary deed of surrender. William Petre, who received it, wrote to Cromwell that they had assented very quietly, and estimated the roof lead to be worth £1000. Apart from the canons, eighty-four people in all kinds of domestic and agricultural service to the priory were listed. Prior Manning, still Suffragan of Ipswich, on the same day sent Cromwell another gift of fowl (herons and pheasants) for his table and expressed the hope that they would not forget his pension.

The Priory was valued at £318.17s.02d. The considerable extent of the priory's temporalities and spiritualities in Suffolk is shown in the Valor Ecclesiasticus. As for the immediate premises, the Duke of Suffolk's interest, not least for the lead, was evident, and the site and adjacent lands were granted on a long lease to his Household Treasurer in July 1538. Mannyng was licensed as Bishop, received a life grant of extensive lands of the manor of Monks Kirby formerly the property of Axholme Priory, and was elected Master of Mettingham College. In February 1540 Suffolk asked Cromwell to intervene with the King to allow him to buy "Buttley and Tangham": Suffolk exchanged the monastic possessions with the Crown, though the reversion of Staverton Park was bought by the Duke of Norfolk.

== Transition to domestic use ==
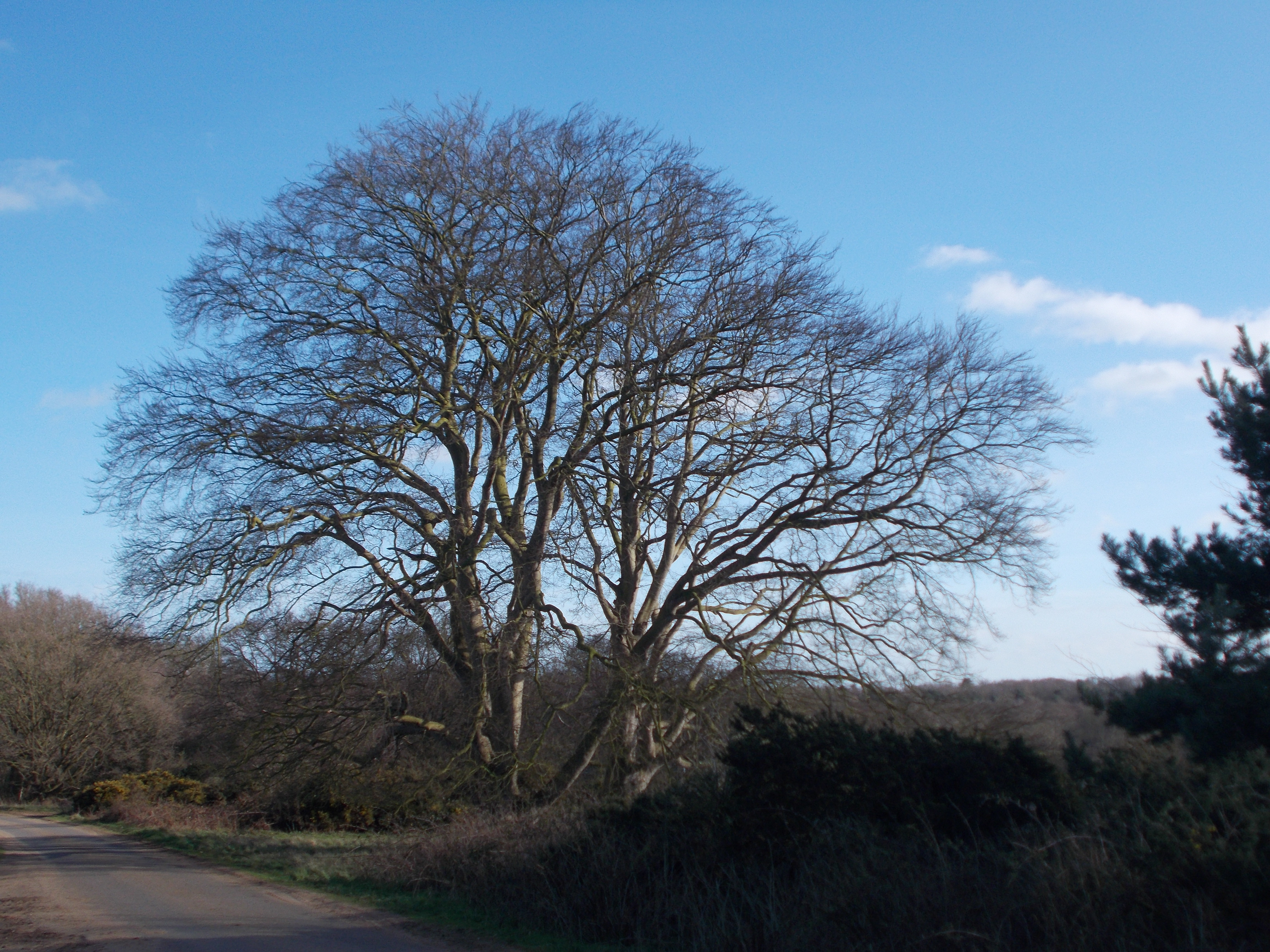
Two beech trees surviving from one of the 'Clumps', in March.

Further researches into the priory itself, its involvement with the life of the surrounding communities, its later owners, and how its impact on the landscape and population devolved into recent times, are brought to life in a recent study.

The monastery site was purchased by William Forth (died 1558) and a large (now lost) house was built by his son Robert adjacent to the Gatehouse. This new mansion was derelict, and the Gatehouse ruinous, by 1738 when illustrated by Samuel and Nathaniel Buck. The Gatehouse was repaired in brick as a residence by George Wright during the 18th century, and was leased by Arthur Chichester, 1st Marquess of Donegall, during whose occupancy it was purchased by his brother-in-law Archibald Hamilton, the future 9th Duke of Hamilton. Further domestic quarters and side pavilions were added, and a long avenue of quincuncial tree-plantations, known as 'the Clumps', each with four beeches around a central pine, was laid out leading from the Woodbridge road.

=== Restoration ===
In 1926 the Gatehouse was purchased by Dr Montague Rendall (1862-1950) to be his home, following his retirement in 1924 as "Informator" (Headmaster) of Winchester College. Rendall, of Harrow School and Trinity College, Cambridge (where he was an exact contemporary of M. R. James of King's, and took a First in Classics in 1885), joined the staff at Winchester in 1887, becoming Second Master in 1899 and Headmaster in 1911. Many of his pupils acknowledged the inspiration of his teaching and example. Never married, and wholehearted in his calling, he steered Winchester through the Great War with a determination to maintain its morale and dignity in Christian acceptance of the call to service and sacrifice. The great project of his last years there, with Sir Herbert Baker, was the planning and construction of the monumental Winchester College War Cloister, an idealization of the 500 Winchester Fallen and of the way of life they had represented, which was dedicated and opened on 31 May 1924.

Having discovered Butley Priory Gatehouse by chance he set about its restoration, the research of its history and heraldry, and the investigation of the priory's archaeology. The architect W.D. Caröe, who had worked with him at Winchester, conducted the restoration in consultation with him in 1926. The original passage through the building was transformed into one large room, cutting away Victorian partitions, laying open the glories of the original vault, and infilling the archways with glazed timber frames. Caröe went through the entire building methodically and wrote an informative account of his observations and solutions. He remarked, "the first thought has been for the preservation and display of antiquity. Almost nothing has been introduced for which there was no definite authority. Nothing ancient has been removed." He was also able to preserve some Elizabethan panelling and a fine Georgian staircase, and some heraldic elements from the Forth era.

Dr Rendall invited his former pupil J.N.L. Myres (whom he called "that prince of archaeologists") to conduct the excavations of 1931-1933, who brought in J.B. Ward Perkins, also a former Winchester student, and others to assist in the work. The resultant publication in the Archaeological Journal, thorough and lucid in Myres's historical research as well as in the description of the findings, amply rewarded Rendall's confidence. Sir James Mann, also a Wykehamist, contributed an explanation of the Gatehouse heraldry in a separate account. The restoration entirely exhausted Dr Rendall's finances, but a most generous neighbour purchased the freehold, allowing him to remain there for the remainder of his life. Myres identified a near-complete transcript of the lost Butley Priory Chronicle in 1935. Dr Rendall saw the proofs of the scholarly edition, which was dedicated to him, not long before he died in 1950. He was proud to declare that "the rebirth of Butley Priory has been a Wykehamical undertaking."

== See also ==
- List of monastic houses in Suffolk
- List of monastic houses in England
