= Alan Morgan (bishop) =

British bishop (1940–2011)

The Right Reverend Alan Morgan OBE
- Bishop of Sherwood
- Church: Church of England
- Diocese: Diocese of Southwell
- In office: 1989–2004
- Predecessor: Dick Darby
- Successor: Tony Porter
- Other post: Archdeacon of Coventry (1983–1989)

Orders
- Ordination: 1964 (deacon); 1965 (priest)
- Consecration: 21 September 1989 by John Habgood

Personal details
- Born: 22 June 1940
- Died: 24 October 2011 (aged 71)
- Denomination: Anglican
- Parents: A. W. Morgan
- Spouse: Margaret née Williams
- Children: 1 son, 1 daughter

Alan Wyndham Morgan, OBE (22 June 1940 – 24 October 2011) was the Bishop of Sherwood, a suffragan bishop in the Church of England Diocese of Southwell, from 1989 until 2004.

== Early life and education ==
He was educated at Gowerton Boys' Grammar School and St David's College, Lampeter.

== Ordained ministry ==
Morgan was ordained a deacon on 25 July 1964 (by John Thomas (Bishop of Swansea and Brecon) in Brecon Cathedral) and a priest in 1965, beginning his ecclesiastical career with curacies in Llangyfelach and Morriston, Cockett and Coventry. Following these he was appointed Team Vicar to St Barnabas, Coventry in 1972 and then in 1978 Bishop's Officer for Social Responsibility to John Gibbs, Bishop of Coventry. Appointed Archdeacon of Coventry in 1983 he was appointed to the episcopate six years later. Following his consecration as a bishop on 21 September 1989 by John Habgood, Archbishop of York, at York Minster, he served as the diocese as Bishop suffragan of Sherwood for fifteen years.

At a national level he was chairman of the General Synod's Board of Social Responsibility's Working Party on the Future of the Family, which produced a report called 'Something to Celebrate' in 1995. He was also part of the Coalfields Task Force and went on to continue the work as Chair of the Coalfields Regeneration Trust.

He retired in 2004.

== Honours ==
Morgan was appointed an Officer of the Order of the British Empire (OBE) in 2005. In the year of his retirement, the then Archbishop of Canterbury, Rowan Williams, awarded him the Cross of St Augustine in recognition of his service to the Anglican Communion.

Church of England titles
Preceded by Dick Darby	Bishop of Sherwood; 1989–2004	Succeeded by Tony Porter
