= George Fisher (bishop) =

British Anglican bishop

George Carnac Fisher (1844 – 9 April 1921) was Bishop of Southampton from 1896 to 1898 and Bishop of Ipswich from 1899 to 1906.

Born in India in 1844 to William Fisher and Frances Brise Fisher (who were first cousins), he was educated at Windlesham House School, Harrow School and Brasenose College, Oxford. In 1874 he was appointed Vicar of Forest Row in 1874, transferring to St George, Barrow in Furness in 1879 and Croydon ten years later. Appointed as Bishop of Southampton (a suffragan bishop in the Diocese of Winchester) in 1894 to succeed William Awdry, he was translated in 1899 to Ipswich (a suffragan in the Diocese of Norwich), a post he held until ill health necessitated his resignation in January 1906.

In 1876, he married Mary Penelope Gwendoline Thompson, daughter of Thomas Charles Thompson, a Liberal MP. He was the father of George Kenneth Thompson Fisher (who died as a result of sniper fire in Gaza on 3 September 1917) and grandfather of Antony Fisher, the founder of the Institute of Economic Affairs. Fisher died at his home in Fleggburgh, Norfolk, on 9 April 1921.

Church of England titles
Preceded by William Awdry	Bishop of Southampton; 1896–1898	Succeeded by Arthur Lyttelton
In abeyance Title last held by Thomas Manning	Bishop of Ipswich; 1899–1906	Succeeded by Luke Paget
