= Tony Porter =

British bishop

The Right Reverend Tony Porter
- Bishop of Sherwood
- Church: Church of England
- Diocese: Southwell and Nottingham
- In office: 2006–2020
- Predecessor: Alan Morgan
- Successor: Andy Emerton

Orders
- Ordination: 29 June 1977 (deacon) by Bill Westwood; 25 June 1978 (priest) by Gerald Ellison
- Consecration: 21 March 2006 by John Sentamu

Personal details
- Born: 10 February 1952 (age 74) RAF Halton, Buckingham, UK
- Denomination: Anglican
- Spouse: Lucille née Roberts (m. 1974)
- Children: 2 sons, 2 daughters
- Occupation: Clergyman, author
- Education: Hertford College, Oxford

Anthony Porter (born 10 February 1952) is a 21st-century Church of England prelate, who served as Suffragan Bishop of Sherwood in the diocese of Southwell and Nottingham from 2006 to 2020.

Bishop Porter retired in 2020, since when he serves as an Honorary Assistant Bishop of Blackburn.

== Early life and education ==
Born in 1952 at RAF Halton, Buckinghamshire, he was one of four children to Sydney Porter, a building society manager.

Educated at Gravesend Grammar School, Porter went up to read English at Hertford College, Oxford (MA), before studying for the priesthood at Ridley Hall, Cambridge, graduating BA (Theol).

== Career ==
Porter was ordained a deacon on St Peter's Day (29 June) 1977 by Bill Westwood, Bishop of Edmonton, at John Keble Church, Mill Hill, and a priest the Petertide following (25 June 1978) by Gerald Ellison, Bishop of London, at St Paul's Cathedral. From 1977 to 1980, Porter served his first curacy at Edgware Parish Church in the diocese of London, and from 1980 to 1983 was curate at St Mary's Haughton Green in the diocese of Manchester. From 1983 to 1987, he was priest-in-charge of Christ Church, Bacup, Lancashire, becoming vicar of that congregation in 1987.

In 1991, Porter was collated as rector of Holy Trinity Platt Church, Rusholme, in the diocese of Manchester. During his time in Manchester, he also served as chaplain to both Manchester City F.C. and Greater Manchester Police, and was appointed an Honorary Canon of Manchester Cathedral by Bishop Nigel McCulloch in 2004.

On 4 November 2005, it was announced that Porter would be raised to the episcopate as Bishop of Sherwood, the Suffragan Bishop of the diocese of Southwell and Nottingham. Consecrated a bishop on 21 March 2006 at York Minster by John Sentamu, Archbishop of York, Porter later served briefly as Acting Bishop of Southwell and Nottingham, from the translation of Paul Butler to the bishopric of Durham on 20 January until he relinquished the additional role due to ill health on 9 April 2014. Retiring on 22 March 2020, Porter now serves as an Honorary Assistant Bishop in the diocese of Blackburn.

A keen sportsman, playing cricket and hockey for many years, Porter was appointed the first Archbishops’ Sports Ambassador (2014–18), and has been a member of the College of Archbishops' Evangelists since 2009.

Bishop Porter has also written several books.

== Marriage and family ==
He married Lucille Roberts in 1974, having four children.

Bishop Porter and his wife now live in Lancashire.

== Styles ==
- The Reverend Tony Porter (1977–2004)
- The Reverend Canon Tony Porter (2004–2006)
- The Right Reverend Tony Porter (2006–present)

Church of England titles
Preceded by Alan Morgan	Bishop of Sherwood; 2006–2020	Succeeded by Andy Emerton
Preceded by Paul Butler	Acting Bishop of Southwell; 2014	Succeeded by Richard Inwood
