= Bishop of Shaftesbury =

Anglican suffragan bishop in England

The Bishop of Shaftesbury was an episcopal title which took its name after the town of Shaftesbury in Dorset, England.

The title was created under the Suffragan Bishops Act 1534, with John Bradley serving as the only suffragan bishop. Following the end of his episcopate, the title has remained in abeyance. Until 1542, the Shaftsbury area had been part of the diocese of Salisbury, then became part of the diocese of Bristol from 1542 to 1836. Since 1836, it is again part of the diocese of Salisbury.

== List of bishops of Shaftesbury ==
Bishops of Shaftesbury
From	Until	Incumbent	Notes
1539	unknown	John Bradley	Formerly Abbot of Milton Abbey. Appointed suffragan bishop in February and consecrated on 23 March 1539.
unknown	present	in abeyance	
