= Dick Darby =

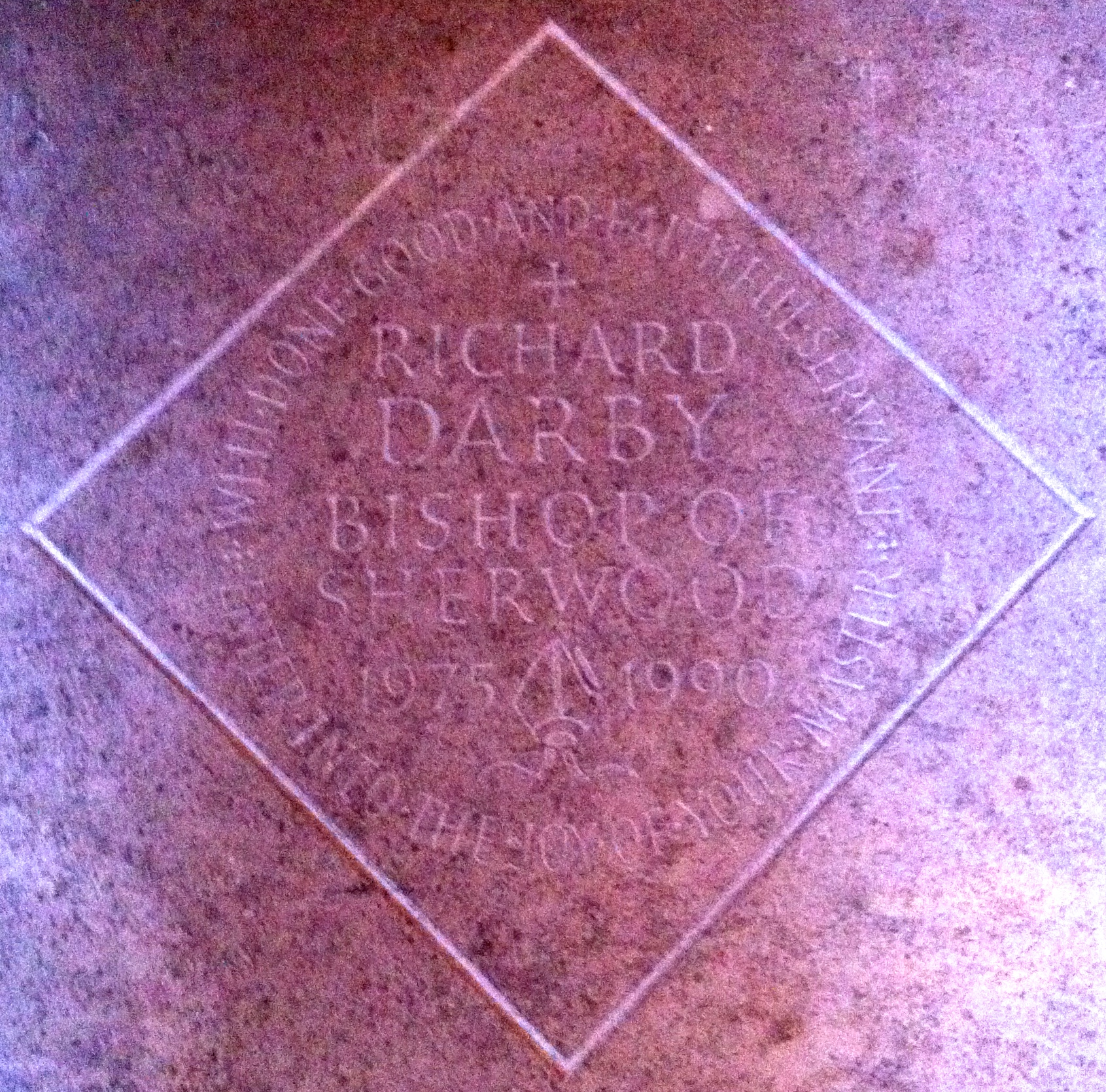
Memorial in Southwell Minster

Harold Richard Darby (28 February 1919 – 27 December 1993) was the Bishop of Sherwood — a suffragan bishop in the Diocese of Southwell — from 1975 until 1988.

He was educated at Durham University, ordained in 1951 and began his ecclesiastical career with curacies in Leyton and Harlow. Following these he was Vicar of Shrub End Colchester and then Waltham Abbey before being appointed Dean of Battle (the vicar of Battle is called the Dean) in 1970, a post he held until his ordination to the episcopate on 24 June 1975 by Stuart Blanch, Archbishop of York, at York Minster. An honorary doctor of the University of Nottingham, he retired in December 1988 and died on Boxing Day 1993.

Church of England titles
Preceded by Kenneth Thompson	Bishop of Sherwood; 1975–1988	Succeeded by Alan Morgan
