= Arthur Bulkeley =

Welsh bishop

Arthur Bulkeley (died 1553) was Bishop of Bangor from 1541 until his death in 1553.

Bulkeley was born in Beaumaris, Anglesey. He was a graduate of Oxford University and in 1523 became Rector of St Peter-le-Bailey, Oxford. Later he was the incumbent at St James Garlickhythe in the City of London. In 1541 he was appointed Bishop of Bangor and consecrated 19 February 1542. He died on 14 March 1553.

== Notes ==
Church of England titles
Preceded by John Bird	Bishop of Bangor; 1541–1552	Succeeded by William Glyn
