= Kenneth Thompson (bishop) =

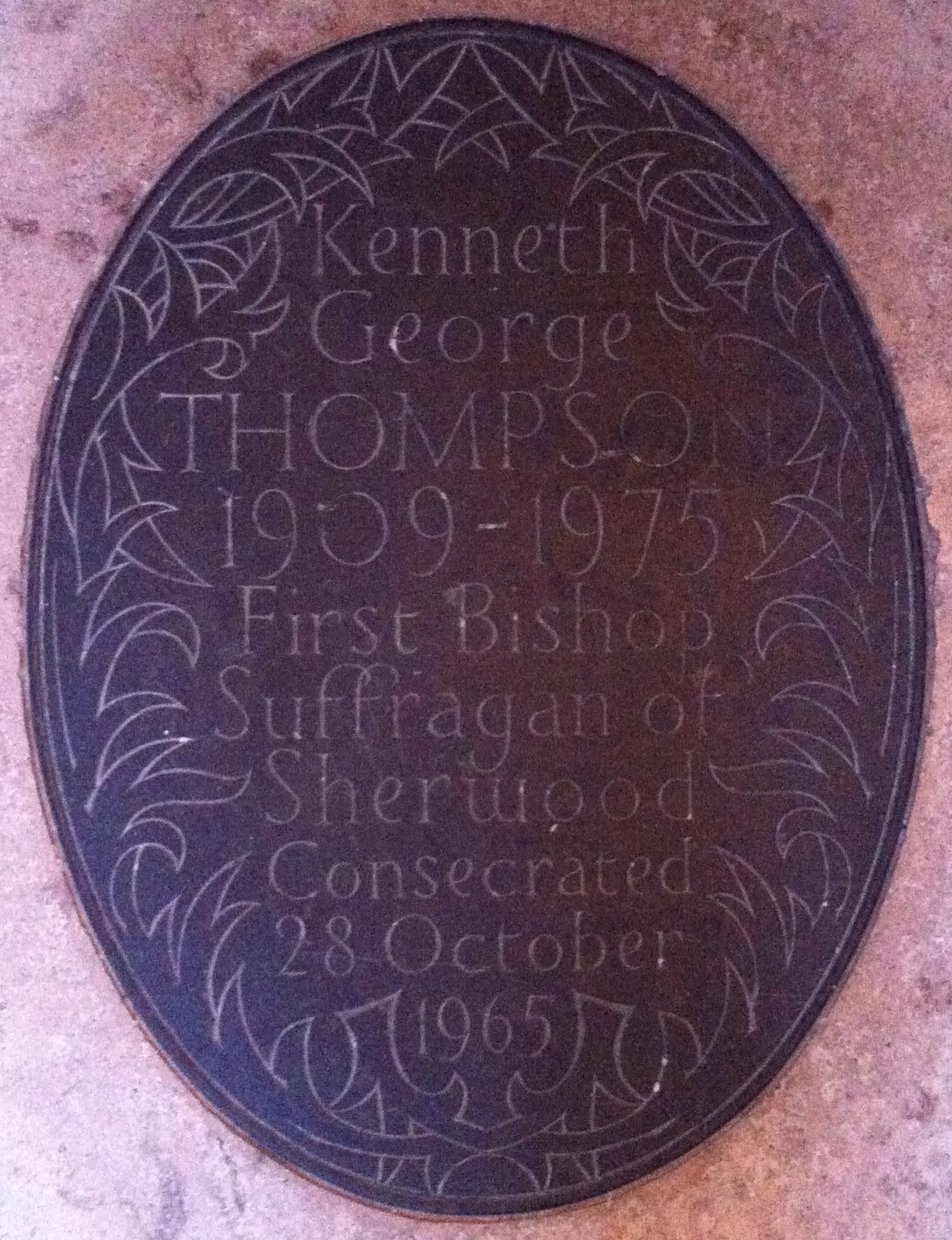
Memorial in Southwell Minster

Kenneth George Thompson (died 1975) was a bishop in the Church of England.

== Career ==
From 1940 to 1944 he was a chaplain to the Royal Naval Volunteer Reserve and vicar of Kneesal and Ossington in Nottinghamshire. From 1944 to 1965 he was vicar of St Mary Magdelene, Hucknall. From 1954 he was a canon of Southwell Minster. In 1962 he was appointed Archdeacon of Newark and a chaplain to Queen Elizabeth II.

In 1965 he was appointed Bishop of Sherwood.

Church of England titles
Preceded by new creation	Bishop of Sherwood; 1965 –1975	Succeeded by Harold Darby

== Sources ==
- The Times 4 August 1965
