= John Bradley (bishop) =

British bishop

Styles of John Bradley
- Reference style: The Right Reverend
- Spoken style: My Lord or Bishop

John Bradley was a sixteenth-century cleric who served as the last abbot of Milton Abbey, before becoming the only suffragan Bishop of Shaftesbury.

A Benedictine monk, he was elected the abbot of Milton Abbey, Blandford Forum, Devon in 1525. At the dissolution of the monasteries, he surrendered the abbey to King Henry VIII on 11 February 1539. He was appointed the suffragan Bishop of Shaftesbury in February and consecrated on 23 March 1539.
