= Andy Emerton =

British Anglican bishop (born 1972)

The Right Reverend Andy Emerton
- Bishop of Sherwood
- Church: Church of England
- Diocese: Diocese of Southwell and Nottingham
- In office: 2020–present

Orders
- Ordination: 2005 (deacon); 2006 (priest)
- Consecration: 21 September 2020 by Paul Butler

Personal details
- Born: Andrew Neil Emerton; 1972 (age 53–54)
- Denomination: Anglicanism

Andrew Neil Emerton (born 1972) is a British Anglican bishop. Since September 2020, he has been Bishop of Sherwood in the Church of England.

== Early life and education ==
Emerton grew up in Guilden Sutton near Chester, Cheshire. He has one brother (the Reverend Dr David Emerton, former director of St Mellitus College, East Midlands) and one sister (a former missionary). He studied at the University of York, graduating with a Bachelor of Science (BSc) degree in 1993. He then continued his studies at The Queen's College, Oxford and the Faculty of Physical Sciences, University of Oxford, graduating with a Doctor of Philosophy (DPhil) degree in 1996. His doctoral thesis was titled "Lattice-gas automata models of self-assembling amphiphilic systems".

Emerton earned experience of Christian ministry as a youth pastor at St Saviours Church, Guildford between 1998 and 2002. He trained for ordination at Ridley Hall, Cambridge from 2002 to 2005. He studied for a Bachelor of Theology (BTh) degree at Downing College, Cambridge, graduating in 2005.

== Ordained ministry ==
Emerton was ordained in the Church of England as a deacon in 2005 and as a priest in 2006. He served his curacy at Holy Trinity Brompton (HTB) from 2005 to 2007. From 2008 to 2020, he was director of St Paul's Theological Centre, a centre for theological learning based at HTB. From 2008 to 2016, he was additionally assistant dean at St Mellitus College, a non-residential theological college of the Dioceses of London and Chelmsford. He then served as dean (i.e. head) of St Mellitus College from to 2016 to 2020. Further to his theological college appointments, he held permission to officiate in the Diocese of Chelmsford from 2008 to 2020.

In March 2020, he was announced as the next Bishop of Sherwood, the suffragan bishop of the Diocese of Southwell and Nottingham: his consecration as a bishop was scheduled for 21 May 2020. That service being postponed because of the coronavirus pandemic, he was instead licensed as "Bishop of Sherwood (designate)" on 1 July. He was consecrated a bishop during a service on 21 September at York Minster: the principal consecrator was Paul Butler, Bishop of Durham rather than Stephen Cottrell, Archbishop of York; Butler was assisted by Sarah Mullally, Bishop of London, and Paul Williams, Bishop of Southwell and Nottingham.
