= Chillesford =

Village in Suffolk, England

Coordinates: 52.117122°N 1.484518°E

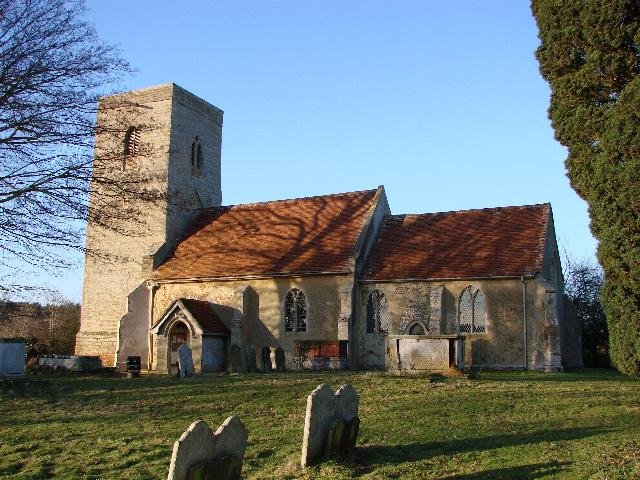
- St Peter's Church

- Location within Suffolk
- Population: 383 (Including Butley and Wantisden 2011)
- Civil parish: Chillesford
- District: East Suffolk
- Shire county: Suffolk
- Region: East
- Country: England
- Sovereign state: United Kingdom
- Post town: Woodbridge
- Postcode district: IP12
- UK Parliament: Suffolk Coastal

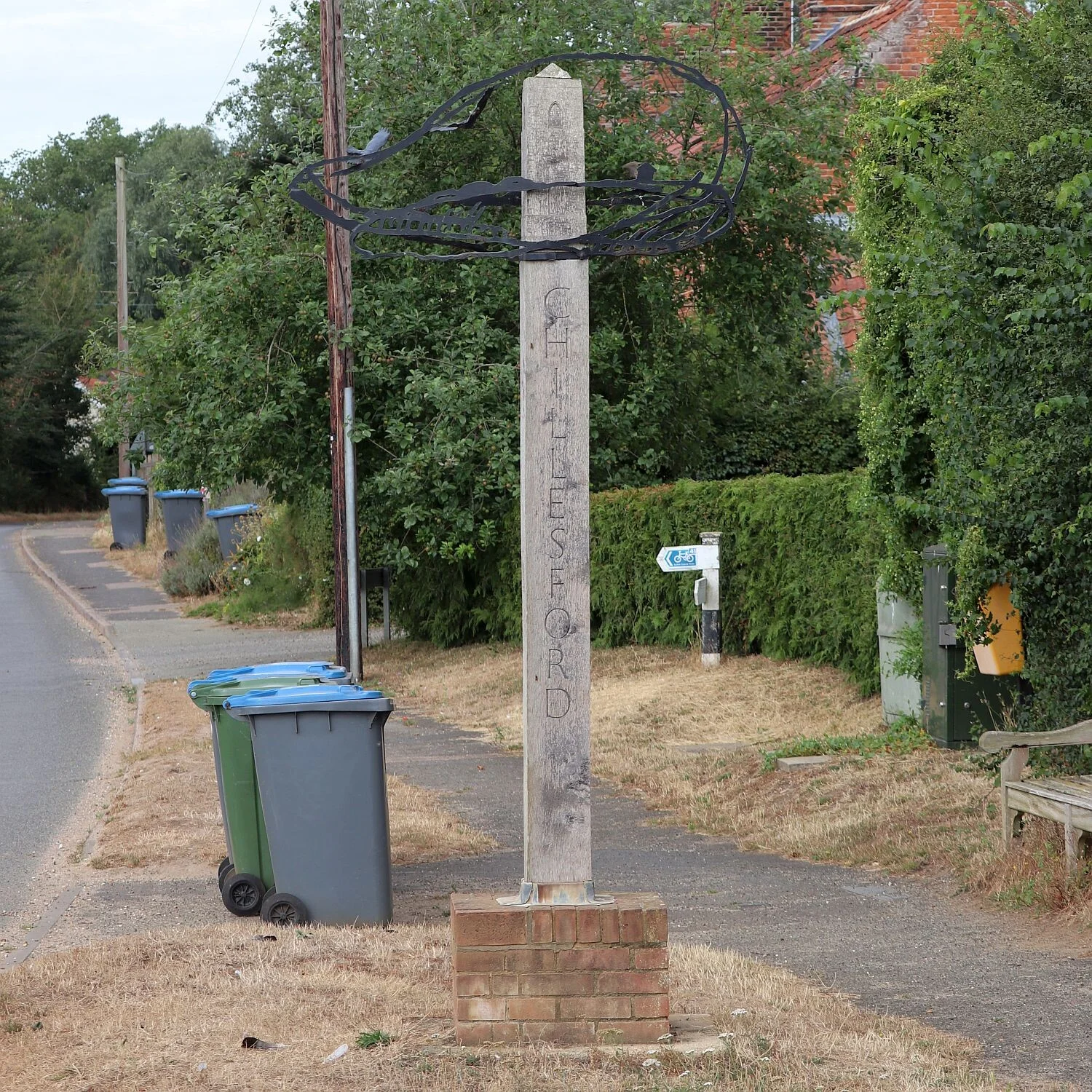
Chillesford Village Sign

Chillesford is a village and civil parish in the East Suffolk district, in the English county of Suffolk. It is located on the B1084 road which runs east to west. Chillesford is 3 miles northwest of the small town of Orford. It is 5 miles southwest of Aldeburgh and 6 miles south of Saxmundham. Population of around 120 and 60 houses. At the 2011 Census the population is included in the civil parish of Butley

The village was recorded in the Domesday Book of 1086 as Cesefortda.

In 1258, Thomas Weyland bought the Manor of Chillesford.

Amy Bantoff used to run the village shop, which is now closed. Mr. Pratt ran the local farm.

Chillesford has a pub, The Froize Inn (east end of B1084), which used to be two cottages.

A church (west end of B1084 – OS grid TM3852) has a tower and various other local buildings are made from local red crag bricks.

The old brickyard was where a 20m skeleton of a whale was also once found.

Pedlars Lane (heads north from the centre of the village) to Tunstall Chapel. Mill Lane (heads south and then south-west) which leads to Butley.

== Chillesford Lodge ==
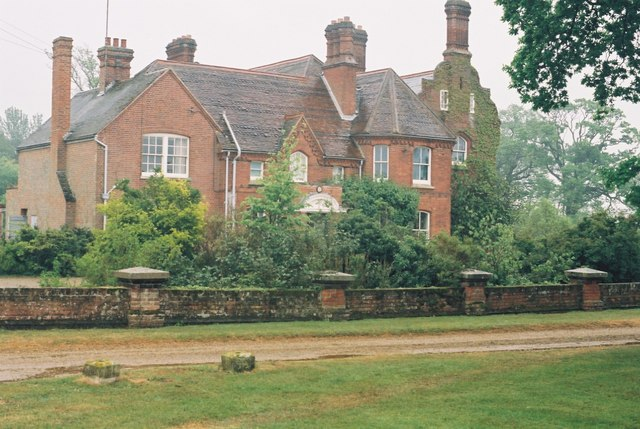
Chillesford Lodge in 2007

Chillesford Lodge (OS grid TM3950) lies over a mile southeast from the village close to Sudbourne Park. In 2015 the 1,200 acre estate is the last remnant of the 7,650 acre Sudbourne Hall estate purchased in 1918 by the Leeds soap manufacturer Joseph Watson, 1st Baron Manton (d.1922) still owned by his descendants today. His third son Alastair Joseph Watson (1901–1955) inherited that part of his father's estates, which totalled some 20,000 acres in England. Chillesford Lodge estate was the Sudbourne Hall estate's Victorian "model farm", the buildings of which were erected in 1875 by Sir Richard Wallace, 1st Baronet of Sudbourne Hall, the noted art collector and illegitimate son of the 4th Marquess of Hertford. At Chillesford Lodge Farm the Red Poll breed of cattle had been developed in the 19th century. The famous "Sudbourne" prefixed herds of Red Poll cattle and the famous "Sudbourne" stud of Suffolk Punch heavy horses, were retained briefly by the Watson family and won several prizes.

== Chillesford Polo Ground ==
In 1936 Alastair Watson of Chillesford Lodge built the Chillesford Polo Ground, a private club open to family and friends where teams played by invitation only. Fred Warner of Lion St, Ipswich, did the work. It represented "country polo at its best" and used an advanced system of irrigation sprinklers, then unique in England, imported by Watson from the US, where he had seen them in use at the Santa Barbara Polo Club in California. The equipment was shipped in from Kentucky, US, on the maiden eastbound voyage of the RMS Queen Mary.The irrigation system was powered by a 1917 Rolls-Royce Silver Ghost engine, serial number L14 or L17, purchased by Watson from a scrapyard in 1936 for £25. Following the January 1976hurricane this engine was passed back to the Rolls-Royce preservation society. Spectators were encouraged and were admitted free of charge, with printed programmes with colour covers provided, a further innovation for a small polo club at the time. The club closed during World War II and was ploughed-up for wartime food-production, but re-opened in 1948. In 1955 Watson was trampled by ponies during a polo match, which led to his death some months later. After this the polo ground was finally ploughed up.
