= Suffragan Bishops Act 1534 =

Act of the Parliament of England

Suffragan Bishops Act 1534 (Note: The citation of this act by this short title was authorised by section 5 of, and the second schedule to, the Statute Law Revision Act 1948. Due to the repeal of those provisions, it is now authorised by section 19(2) of the Interpretation Act 1978.)
- Act of Parliament
- Parliament of England
- Long title: An Acte for nominacion and consecracyon of Suffragans wythin this Realme. (Note: These words are printed against this act in the second column of the second schedule to the Statute Law Revision Act 1948, which is headed "Title".)
- Citation: 26 Hen. 8. c. 14
- Territorial extent: England and Wales

Dates
- Royal assent: 18 December 1534
- Commencement: 3 November 1534 (Note: Start of session.)
Other legislation
Amended by	Statute Law Revision Act 1888; Criminal Law Act 1967; Statute Law (Repeals) Act 1977; Statute Law (Repeals) Act 1977; Dioceses Measure 1978; Statute Law (Repeals) Measure 2018
Relates to	Statute of Praemunire; Suffragans Nomination Act 1888; Suffragan Bishops Act 1898

Status: Amended

Text of statute as originally enacted

Revised text of statute as amended

Text of the Suffragan Bishops Act 1534 as in force today (including any amendments) within the United Kingdom, from legislation.gov.uk.

The Suffragan Bishops Act 1534 (26 Hen. 8. c. 14) is an act of the Parliament of England that authorised the appointment of suffragan (i.e., assistant) bishops in England and Wales. The tradition of appointing suffragans named after a town in the diocese other than the town the diocesan bishop is named after can be dated from this act.

The act named Thetford, Ipswich, Colchester, Dover, Guildford, Southampton, Taunton, Shaftesbury, Molton, Marlborough, Bedford, Leicester, Gloucester, Shrewsbury, Bristol, Penrydd, Bridgwater, Nottingham, Grantham, Hull, Huntingdon, Cambridge, Penrith, Berwick-upon-Tweed, St Germans and the Isle of Wight as specific suitable suffragan sees.

This act was partly in force in Great Britain at the end of 2010.

The repeal by the Statute Law (Repeals) Act 1969 of section 2 of the Act of Supremacy (1 Eliz. 1. c. 1) (1558) does not affect the continued operation, so far as unrepealed, of the Suffragan Bishops Act 1534.

Suffragan Bishops Act 1898 (Note: Section 2.)
- Act of Parliament
- Parliament of the United Kingdom
- Long title: An Act to explain the Act as to Suffragan Bishops.
- Citation: 61 & 62 Vict. c. 11
- Territorial extent: United Kingdom

Dates
- Royal assent: 1 July 1898
- Commencement: 1 July 1898 (Note: The Acts of Parliament (Commencement) Act 1793.)
Other legislation
Relates to	Suffragan Bishops Act 1534; Suffragans Nomination Act 1888

Status: Current legislation

Text of statute as originally enacted

Revised text of statute as amended

Text of the Suffragan Bishops Act 1898 as in force today (including any amendments) within the United Kingdom, from legislation.gov.uk.

Since 1898, notwithstanding anything contained in the Suffragan Bishops Act 1534 it has been lawful to nominate, present and appoint as suffragan bishop persons already consecrated as a bishop and, in that case, the letters patent presenting them do not require their consecration. The Dioceses Measure 1978 concerns petitions to make appointments under this act. Until 1898, men already in episcopal orders were sometimes made assistant bishops instead.

== Provisions ==
=== Section 2 ===
In section 2 of the act, the words from "and have such capacitie" to the end were repealed by section 15(2)(a) of the Dioceses Measure 1978. This repeal does not invalidate any commission given to a suffragan bishop which was in force immediately before the commencement of that Measure (s. 15(3)). Section 15(4) provides for such commissions to continue in force until the date on which the suffragan bishop to whom the commission was given ceases to hold that office, or the date on which the commission is revoked by the bishop of the diocese, whichever first occurs. So long as any such commission remains in force so much of section 2 of the Suffragan Bishops Act 1534 as is repealed by 15(2)(a) of that Measure continues, notwithstanding the repeal, to apply to the suffragan bishop to whom the commission was given (s. 15(5)).

=== Section 4 ===
In section 4 of the act, the words from "nor use" to the end were repealed by section 15(2)(b) of the Dioceses Measure 1978. This repeal does not invalidate any commission given to a suffragan bishop which was in force immediately before the commencement of that Measure (s. 15(3)). Section 15(4) provides for such commissions to continue in force until the date on which the suffragan bishop to whom the commission was given ceases to hold that office, or the date on which the commission is revoked by the bishop of the diocese, whichever first occurs. So long as any such commission remains in force so much of section 2 of the Suffragan Bishops Act 1534 as is repealed by 15(2)(b) of that Measure continues, notwithstanding the repeal, to apply to the suffragan bishop to whom the commission was given (s. 15(5)).

=== Section 6 ===
In section 6 of the act, the words "of the bishop to whom he shall be suffragan" were substituted for the words "where he shall have comyssyon" by section 15(6) of the Dioceses Measure 1978.

== 1534 titles ==
Those titles mandated by the 1534 act currently in use as suffragan sees today are indicated in bold type:

See	Diocese	Years	See	Diocese	Years
**Bishop of Bedford**	Diocese of London	1537–1560, 1879–1898	Bishop of the Isle of Wight	No evidence of use (now in Portsmouth); There is an application to revive underway as of November 2024.	
**Bishop of Bedford**	**Diocese of St Albans**	**1935–present**	Bishop of Leicester	Diocese of Peterborough	1888–1927
**Bishop of Berwick**	Diocese of Durham	1537–1571	Bishop of Leicester	Diocesan title	1927–present
**Bishop of Berwick**	**Diocese of Newcastle**	**2016–present**	Bishop of Marlborough	Diocese of Salisbury	1537–1568
Bishop of Bridgwater	No evidence of use (now in Bath & Wells)		Bishop of Marlborough	Diocese of London	1888–1918
Bishop of Bristol	Diocese of Worcester	1538–1542	Bishop of Molton	No evidence of use (now in Exeter)	
Bishop of Bristol	Diocesan title	1542–present	Bishop of Nottingham	Diocese of York	1567–1570
Bishop of Cambridge	No evidence of use (now in Ely)		Bishop of Nottingham	Diocese of Lincoln	1870–1884
**Bishop of Colchester**	Diocese of Ely	1536–1541, 1592–1608	Bishop of Nottingham	Diocese of Southwell	1884–1893
**Bishop of Colchester**	Diocese of St Albans	1882–1914	Bishop of Nottingham	Diocesan title	2005–present
**Bishop of Colchester**	**Diocese of Chelmsford**	**1914–present**	Bishop of Penrydd	Diocese of Llandaff	1537–1539
**Bishop of Dover**	**Diocese of Canterbury**	1536–1597, **1870–present**	**Bishop of Penrith**	Diocese of Ripon	1888–1889
**Bishop of Dover**	also "Bishop in Canterbury" since c. 1999		**Bishop of Penrith**	**Diocese of Carlisle**	**1939–present**
Bishop of Gloucester	No evidence of use as suffragan see		**Bishop of St Germans**	**Diocese of Truro**	1905–1918, **1974–present**
Bishop of Gloucester	Diocesan title	1541–present	Bishop of Shaftesbury	Diocese of Salisbury	1539
**Bishop of Grantham**	**Diocese of Lincoln**	**1905–present**	**Bishop of Shrewsbury**	Diocese of Llandaff (probably)	1537–1561
Bishop of Guildford	Diocese of Winchester	1874–1927	**Bishop of Shrewsbury**	**Diocese of Lichfield**	1888–1905, **1940–present**
Bishop of Guildford	Diocesan title	1927–present	**Bishop of Southampton**	**Diocese of Winchester**	**1895–present**
**Bishop of Hull**	**Diocese of York**	1538–1579, **1891–present**	**Bishop of Taunton**	**Diocese of Bath and Wells**	1538–1559, **1911–present**
**Bishop of Huntingdon**	**Diocese of Ely**	**1966–present**	**Bishop of Thetford**	**Diocese of Norwich**	1536–1570, 1894–1926, **1945–present**
Bishop of Ipswich	Diocese unclear	1536–1538			
Bishop of Ipswich	Diocese of Norwich	1899–1909			
Bishop of Ipswich	Diocesan title	1914–present			

== Other suffragan titles ==
Suffragans Nomination Act 1888 (Note: Section 1.)
- Act of Parliament
- Parliament of the United Kingdom
- Long title: An Act to make further provision for the Nomination of Bishops Suffragans.
- Citation: 51 & 52 Vict. c. 56
- Territorial extent: United Kingdom

Dates
- Royal assent: 24 December 1888
- Commencement: 24 December 1888 (Note: The Acts of Parliament (Commencement) Act 1793.)
Other legislation
Amended by	Statute Law Revision Act 1950; Dioceses Measure 1978
Relates to	Suffragan Bishops Act 1534; Suffragans Bishops Act 1898

Status: Amended

Text of statute as originally enacted

Revised text of statute as amended

Text of the Suffragans Nomination Act 1888 as in force today (including any amendments) within the United Kingdom, from legislation.gov.uk.

Since the passage of the Suffragans Nomination Act 1888, it has been lawful to create suffragan sees named for other towns. These have so far included (those titles currently in use as suffragan sees today are indicated in bold type):

- **Bishop of Aston** (Birmingham, 15 July 1954)
- **Bishop of Barking** (Chelmsford; initially St Albans)
- Bishop of Barrow-in-Furness (Carlisle, 6 April 1889)
- **Bishop of Basingstoke** (Winchester)
- **Bishop of Beverley** (York)
- **Bishop of Birkenhead** (Chester)
- **Bishop of Bolton** (Manchester, 8 February 1984)
- **Bishop of Bradford** (Leeds, 20 April 2014)
- **Bishop of Bradwell** (Chelmsford, 20 December 1967)
- **Bishop of Brixworth** (Peterborough, 26 July 1988)
- **Bishop of Buckingham** (Oxford, 22 November 1913)
- **Bishop of Burnley** (Blackburn; initially Manchester)
- Bishop of Coventry (Worcester; now a diocese)
- **Bishop of Crediton** (Exeter)
- **Bishop of Croydon** (Southwark; initially Canterbury)
- Bishop of Derby (Southwell; now a diocese)
- **Bishop of Doncaster** (Sheffield, 4 February 1972)
- **Bishop of Dorchester** (Oxford, 2 February 1939)
- **Bishop of Dorking** (Guildford; initially Winchester)
- **Bishop of Dudley** (Worcester, 24 October 1973)
- **Bishop of Dunwich** (St Edmundsbury and Ipswich, 14 August 1934)
- **Bishop of Ebbsfleet** (Canterbury, 8 February 1994)
- **Bishop of Edmonton** (London, 29 May 1970)
- **Suffragan Bishop in Europe** (Europe)
- **Bishop of Fulham** (London, 1 February 1926)
- **Bishop of Grimsby** (Lincoln, 15 July 1935)
- **Bishop of Hertford** (St Albans)
- **Bishop of Horsham** (Chichester)
- **Bishop of Huddersfield** (Leeds, 20 April 2014)
- Bishop of Hulme (Manchester, 11 October 1923)
- **Bishop of Islington** (London)
- **Bishop of Jarrow** (Durham)
- **Bishop of Kensington** (London)
- **Bishop of Kingston-upon-Thames** (Southwark)
- **Bishop of Kirkstall** (Leeds; formerly Bishop of Richmond, in Ripon diocese)
- **Bishop of Lancaster** (Blackburn, 24 July 1936)
- **Bishop of Lewes** (Chichester)
- **Bishop of Loughborough** (Leicester, 12 April 2017)
- **Bishop of Ludlow** (Hereford, 23 September 1981)
- **Bishop of Lynn** (Norwich, 26 June 1963)
- **Bishop of Maidstone** (Canterbury)
- **Bishop of Middleton** (Manchester, 10 August 1926)
- **Bishop of Plymouth** (Exeter, 21 November 1922)
- **Bishop of Ramsbury** (Salisbury, 24 October 1973)
- **Bishop of Reading** (Oxford)
- **Bishop of Repton** (Derby, 18 May 1965)
- **Bishop of Richborough** (Canterbury, 8 February 1994)
- **Bishop of Ripon** (Leeds; formerly Bishop of Knaresborough, in Ripon diocese)
- **Bishop of Selby** (York, 20 December 1938)
- Bishop of Sheffield (York; now a diocese)
- **Bishop of Sherborne** (Salisbury, 6 February 1925)
- **Bishop of Sherwood** (Southwell, 18 May 1965)
- Bishop of Southwark (Rochester; now a diocese)
- **Bishop of Stafford** (Lichfield)
- **Bishop of Stepney** (London)
- **Bishop of Stockport** (Chester)
- **Bishop of Swindon** (Bristol; formerly Bishop of Malmesbury, 25 July 1927)
- **Bishop of Tewkesbury** (Gloucester)
- **Bishop of Tonbridge** (Rochester, 11 September 1958)
- **Bishop of Wakefield** (Leeds; formerly Bishop of Pontefract, in Wakefield diocese, 27 October 1930)
- **Bishop of Warrington** (Liverpool)
- **Bishop of Warwick** (Coventry, 19 December 1979)
- Bishop of Whalley (Blackburn; initially Manchester, 28 June 1909)
- **Bishop of Whitby** (York, 30 July 1923)
- **Bishop of Willesden** (London, 8 August 1911)
- **Bishop of Wolverhampton** (Lichfield, 6 February 1979)
- **Bishop of Woolwich** (Southwark)

In 2015, research by the Church's Legal Office on behalf of the Dioceses Commission uncovered fourteen "forgotten" suffragan Sees which had been erected by Orders-in-Council in 1889 but never filled. The Dioceses Commission has advised that these may be revived and filled just as any other dormant See might. The see of Oswestry was filled by the consecration of Paul Thomas on 2 February 2023, and the see of Wigan was filled by the translation of Ruth Worsley from Taunton on 4 April 2025; but the others remain unfilled.

By Order-in-Council dated 6 April 1889:

- Bishop of Alnwick (Newcastle)
- Bishop of Bishopwearmouth (Durham)
- Bishop of Halifax (Leeds; formerly Wakefield)
- Bishop of Hexham (Newcastle)
- Bishop of Kendal (Carlisle)
- Bishop of Rochdale (Manchester)
- **Bishop of Wigan** (Liverpool)

By Order-in-Council dated 5 July 1889:

- Bishop of Aylesbury (Oxford)
- Bishop of Boston (Lincoln)
- Bishop of Chelsea (London)
- Bishop of Cirencester (Gloucester)
- Bishop of Leominster (Hereford)
- Bishop of Northampton (Peterborough)
- **Bishop of Oswestry** (Lichfield)

Further — besides that of Penrydd (now in St David's diocese), erected by the 1534 Act — six further Welsh Sees were erected following the 1888 Act: at Cardiff (in Llandaff diocese), Carnarvon (Bangor), Holyhead (Bangor), Monmouth (then in Llandaff, now a diocesan See), Wrexham (St Asaph) and Swansea (then in St Davids, now a diocesan See as Swansea and Brecon).

== Subsequent developments ==
Section 7 of the act was repealed by section 1(1) of, and part V of schedule 1 to, the Statute Law (Repeals) Act 1977, which came into force on 16 June 1977.

Section 5 of the act was repealed by section 1 of, and part 1 of the schedule to, the Statute Law (Repeals) Measure 2018, which came into force on 1 July 2018.
