= Francis Jayne =

British Anglican bishop and scholar (1845–1921)

The Right Reverend Francis Jayne
- Bishop of Chester
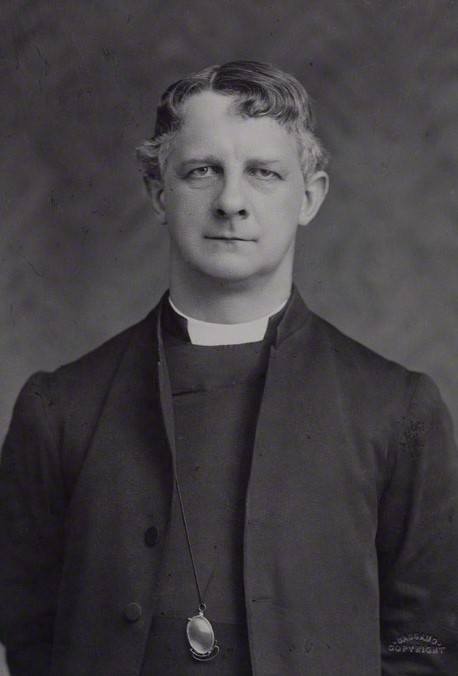
- Jayne, c. 1870s–1900s
- Church: Church of England
- Province: York
- Diocese: Chester
- In office: 1889–1919
- Predecessor: William Stubbs
- Successor: Luke Paget

Personal details
- Born: Francis John Jayne; 1 January 1845 Pant-y-beiliau, Llanelli, Wales
- Died: 23 August 1921 (aged 76) Oswestry, England
- Buried: Bowdon, England
- Denomination: Anglican
- Spouse: Emily Garland
- Education: Wadham College, Oxford

Francis John Jayne (1 January 1845 – 23 August 1921) was a British bishop and academic.

== Early years ==
Born in Pant-y-beiliau, Gilwern, Llanelli, Jayne was the eldest son of John Jayne, a colliery owner and his second wife, Elisabeth Haines. He was educated at Rugby School and Wadham College, Oxford. He took his BA in 1868 and MA in 1870, being awarded first-class honours in classical moderations, literae humaniores, jurisprudence and modern history. He was elected Fellow of Jesus College, Oxford, in 1868 and tutor of Keble College in 1871. He was ordained deacon and priest in 1870.

From 1879 to 1886, Jayne was Principal of St David's College, a university institution in the small Welsh town of Lampeter. During his time there, he steered the institution through the difficult years following the 1880 Aberdare Report on intermediate and higher education in Wales. The report recommended that the Colleges at Aberystwyth and Lampeter be united to form one institution, but Jayne fought the plan and retained St. David's College's independence. Jayne reformed the college in many ways; new statutes were issued and affiliation to Oxford and Cambridge was achieved. A new hall of residence was constructed and the college chapel was rebuilt. The number of students doubled. The college school opened in 1884, with the aim of providing a sound education for future entrants to the college. Jayne is remembered as the 'second founder' of the college.

A devoutly religious man, Jayne left Lampeter to become an Anglican vicar in Leeds. He became Bishop of Chester in 1889, a position he held for the next thirty years. At the time of his appointment, he was the youngest English bishop. Under his rule, his diocese was said to be 'perhaps the most peaceful and orderly in England.'

Jayne was concerned about excessive drinking and the misuse of alcohol. He published an article called Successful Public-House Reform discussing the virtues of the Scandinavian Gothenburg system for managing pubs etc. He also founded the People's Refreshment House Association Limited which at its peak owned 130 inns and hotels. Although Jayne was in poor health for lengthy periods during the First World War, and Edward Mercer, a retired Bishop of Tasmania, carried out many of his duties, Jayne left no one in any doubt about his support for British participation in the War against Germany and her allies. He said ‘The sword which God gave to earthly rulers to wield was given, we ventured to think, to England as the peacemaker of the world, as the guardian of the seas against the perils which would otherwise assail not only ourselves ... but all the nations of Europe and the world’. He followed up two months later clarifying what he regarded as Britain‘s duty ‘We are fighting, not only for ourselves and the safety of our Empire, but for the very life of Christian civilisation, for the cause of righteousness, honour and liberty, for the independence of smaller states ... and ultimately for the peace of the world.’

He instigated a Roll of Honour with names of his clergy and their families who had volunteered for the Forces. He promoted the work of the Church Army and the YMCA, their need for volunteers and fund-raising. His increased workload led his staff to compel him to ‘abstain from all duties’ and to rest but his health remained fragile until and after his retirement.

He resigned his bishopric in April 1919 owing to ill health caused by over work. He died at his home at The Quarry, Oswestry, and was buried at Bowdon, Cheshire.

He and his wife Emily (née Garland) had six sons and three daughters, one of whom was the Norwegian-to-English translator Edith M. G. Jayne.

Academic offices
Preceded by Llewelyn Lewellin	Principal of St David's College; 1879–1886	Succeeded by Herbert Ryle
Church of England titles
Preceded by William Stubbs	Bishop of Chester; 1889–1919	Succeeded by Luke Paget
Professional and academic associations
Preceded by William Stubbs	President of the Historic Society of Lancashire and Cheshire; 1889–1903	Succeeded by Frederick, 16th Earl of Derby
