= John Bird (bishop) =

English Carmelite friar and bishop

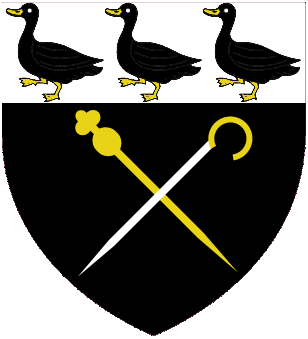
Arms: Sable a mace Or in bend surmounted of a pastoral staff in bend sinister Argent headed Or on a chief Argent three shovellers also Argent.

John Bird (died 1558) was an English Carmelite friar and subsequently a bishop.

He was Warden of the Carmelite house in Coventry, and twice Provincial of his order. He attracted the attention of Henry VIII by his preaching in favour of the royal supremacy over the English Church.

== Life ==
He was one of the divines sent in 1531 to confer and argue with Thomas Bilney, the reformer, in prison; and in 1535 he was sent by Henry VIII along with Richard Foxe, the royal almoner, and Thomas Bedyll, a clerk of the council, to Catherine of Aragon, now divorced by Henry, to try to persuade her not to use the title queen.

He was suffragan to the Bishop of Llandaff (titled Bishop of Penrydd (then spelled Penreth), after Penrydd in Pembrokeshire and was then translated to become Bishop of Bangor. He then was appointed as the inaugural Bishop of Chester. The new diocese had both administrative and financial problems: Bird tried to address the finances, and dispensed with archdeacons, but succeeded only in making disadvantageous agreements with the Crown and with leaseholders.

After the accession of the Catholic Queen Mary he was deprived of his bishopric on 16 March 1554 since he had married. He at once repudiated his wife, and soon afterwards Edmund Bonner, Bishop of London, appointed him as his suffragan, and on 6 November 1554 presented him to the vicarage of Great Dunmow in Essex.

Near the end of 1558, he died in an obscure condition and was buried in Chester Cathedral.

== Notes ==
Attribution

This article incorporates text from a publication now in the public domain: Cooper, Thompson (1886). "Bird, John (d.1558)". In Stephen, Leslie (ed.). Dictionary of National Biography. Vol. 5. London: Smith, Elder & Co.

Church of England titles
New title	Bishop of Penrydd; 1537–1539	In abeyance
Preceded by John Capon	Bishop of Bangor; 1539–1541	Succeeded by Arthur Bulkeley
New diocese	Bishop of Chester; 1542–1554	Succeeded by George Cotes
