= Luke Paget =

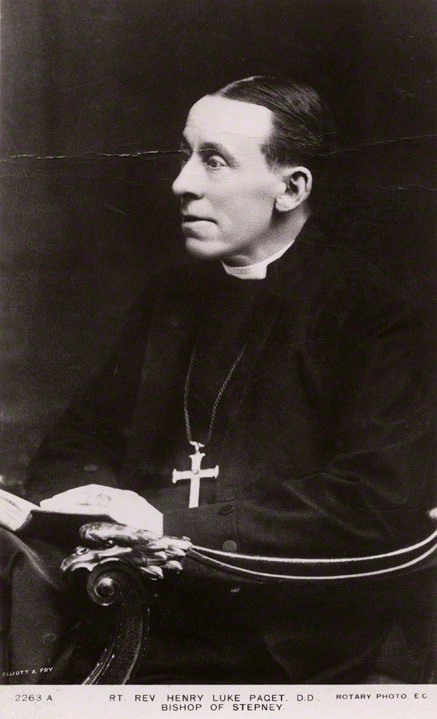
Henry Luke Paget

Henry Luke Paget (1853−1937) was the 4th Anglican Bishop of Stepney from 1909 until 1919 when he was appointed Bishop of Chester.

== Early life ==
Paget was born in 1853 and educated at Shrewsbury and Christ Church, Oxford before embarking on an ecclesiastical career. He was the son of surgeon James and brother of Francis (sometime Bishop of Oxford).

== Career ==
He was ordained on 16 June 1877 (Trinity Sunday) and went as assistant curate to St Andrew's Wells Street in London's West End, serving under Benjamin Webb, the co-founder of the Cambridge Camden Society which had campaigned for the building of the church which had opened in 1847. In 1879 Paget went to the Leeds Clergy School as vice principal but returned to London's East End in 1881. The happiest period of this career, he stated, was at this East End mission to the poor. After an incumbency at St Ives, Cambridgeshire, a brief period as Prebendary of Newington in St Paul's Cathedral and another brief period as the suffragan Bishop of Ipswich, he was translated to be the Bishop of Stepney in 1909, a position he held until becoming Bishop of Chester in 1919. This appointment was not without controversy as he was by then 66. But he was to serve until 1932 when he was 79.

St Andrew's Wells Street was physically moved to Kingsbury in North West London and opened in 1934. Paget attended the opening and was said to have been moved by handling vessels he had used when he was a new priest. He asked to be buried in the graveyard adjacent to the church so that he could be near to his beloved St Andrew's. This is where he lies with his wife, having been buried there after his death in 1937.

== Personal life ==
Paget and his wife, Elma Katie, had a son in 1901, Paul Edward Paget, who rebuilt many of the London churches damaged during World War II. A biography of Paget, Henry Luke Paget: portrait and frame (London: Longmans, Green, 1939), was written after his death by his wife.

Coat of arms of Luke Paget
| Escutcheon Sable on a cross engrailed between in the first and fourth quarters an eagle displayed and in the second and third an heraldic tyger passant Argent an escallop also Sable. |

Church of England titles
| Preceded by George Fisher | Bishop of Ipswich; 1906–1909 | Succeeded by No appointment |
| Preceded by Cosmo Lang | Bishop of Stepney; 1909–1919 | Succeeded by Henry Mosley |
| Preceded by Francis Jayne | Bishop of Chester; 1919–1932 | Succeeded by Geoffrey Fisher |
