= Bishop of Sherwood =

Bishop of Southwell and Nottingham, England

The Bishop of Sherwood is an episcopal title used by a suffragan bishop of the Church of England Diocese of Southwell and Nottingham, in the Province of York, England.

== History ==
The title takes its name after the royal forest of Sherwood in Nottinghamshire; the See was erected under the Suffragans Nomination Act 1888 by Order in Council dated 18 May 1965.

== List of bishops ==
Bishops of Sherwood
From	Until	Incumbent	Notes
1965	1975	Kenneth Thompson	
1975	1988	Dick Darby	
1989	2004	Alan Morgan	
2006	2020	Tony Porter	Also acting diocesan bishop, 20 January – 9 April 2014; retired 22 March 2020.
2020	present	Andy Emerton	Announced 11 March 2020; consecration scheduled for 21 May (postponed); licensed as "Bishop of Sherwood (designate)" on 1 July; and consecrated 21 September
