= Staverton Park and The Thicks, Wantisden =

Protected area in Suffolk, England

Coordinates: 52.1°N 1.44°E

- Site of Special Scientific Interest
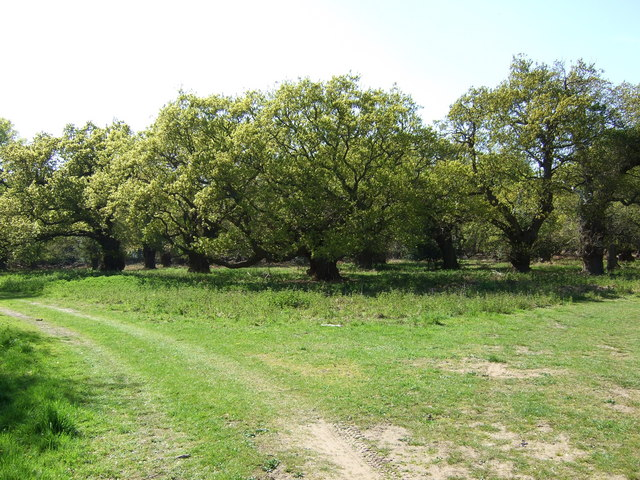
- Location of Staverton Park and The Thicks, Wantisden.
- Area of search: Suffolk
- Grid reference: TM 356 507
- Interest: Biological
- Area: 80.8 hectares
- Notification date: 1984
- Location map: Magic Map

Staverton Park and The Thicks, Wantisden is an 80.8-hectare (200-acre) biological Site of Special Scientific Interest west of Butley in Suffolk. It is a Nature Conservation Review site, Grade I, and a Special Area of Conservation. It is in the Suffolk Coast and Heaths Area of Outstanding Natural Beauty.

This ancient park is woodland on sandy soil, with mature pollarded oaks, while The Thicks is a dense wood with hollies, some of them thought to be the largest in Britain. There is a rich lichen flora, and invertebrates include rare species.

The site is private land but a public footpath goes through it.
