= Coalfields Regeneration Trust =

UK registered charity

The Coalfields Regeneration Trust is a registered charity that works across the former Coalfield communities of England, Wales and Scotland. The Charity was founded in 1999.

The Coalfields Regeneration Trust receives funding from the Department of Communities and Local Government for their work in English communities, The Welsh Government for their Welsh activities and the Scottish Government to cover their Scottish work. The Trust runs a number of initiatives and activities that make things happen at a community level in Coalfield areas. Each Country sets its own strategic objectives in line with local priorities.

== Operations ==
=== England ===
The Coalfields Regeneration Trust in England provides support to community groups, voluntary organisations and partners through a range of programmes. These include; Coalfields Community Grants which provides small grant support to community organisations; Enterprising Communities that provides practical help and technical assistance to support the development of social enterprises; Game on, which engages young people through football; and the Coalfields Micro Business Loan Fund which invests in new start businesses to help stimulate entrepreneurship in the coalfields. In addition, it is embarking on an ambitious programme of investment in property and development to generate the income to sustain its social investment activities moving forward. The Coalfields Regeneration Trust in England operates in the following regions; North East; North West; Yorkshire; East Midlands; West Midlands and Kent.

=== Wales ===
The Coalfields Regeneration Trust in Wales works within the community to tackle the issues that most affect the prosperity, resilience and opportunities available to the people who live in the Coalfield communities of Wales – which remain the most deprived and disadvantaged communities both in Wales and across the UK. They operate from their own buildings, such as the CRT Hwb Cana in Penywaun, Wales.

=== Scotland ===
The Coalfields Regeneration Trust in Scotland has focuses on its own Scottish priorities through which they have developed a number of programmes which include the Coalfields Community Challenge which identifies and nurtures new social entrepreneurs; the Coalfield Community Futures Programme which helps local people to develop a five-year action plan for their communities future, and local programmes like Sportworks (funded by the Department for Work and Pensions), which combines sport and employment skills training. Coalfields Regeneration Trust in Scotland operates in parts of the four former Scottish coalfields areas, of Ayrshire, Fife & Central, Lanarkshire, and the Lothians.
