= Bishop of Ipswich =

Anglican suffragan bishop in England

The Bishop of Ipswich was an episcopal title used by a suffragan bishop of the Church of England Diocese of Norwich, in the Province of Canterbury, England.

The first Bishop of Ipswich was created under the Suffragan Bishops Act 1534, and the title took its name after the county town of Ipswich in Suffolk. After the first suffragan bishop, the position fell into abeyance. It was revived in 1899, with two more suffragan bishops, but eventually, through reorganisation within the Church of England in 1914, Ipswich became part of the Diocese of St Edmundsbury and Ipswich.

== List of bishops ==
Suffragan Bishops of Ipswich
From	Until	Incumbent	Notes
1536	1538	Thomas Manning	Consecrated on 19 March 1536. He does not appear to have acted as a suffragan bishop in diocese of Norwich.
1538	1899	in abeyance	During this period, Thomas Wagstaffe was consecrated as nonjuring bishop of Ipswich on 24 February 1694. He died on 17 October 1712.
1899	1906	George Fisher	Formerly Bishop of Southampton
1906	1909	Luke Paget	Translated to Stepney
1909	1914	Suffragan see vacant	
In 1914, Ipswich became part of the Diocese of St Edmundsbury and Ipswich and the title of Bishop of Ipswich became part of the diocesan Bishop of St Edmundsbury and Ipswich's title
