= Wantisden =

Village in Suffolk, England

Coordinates: 52.110617°N 1.457811°E

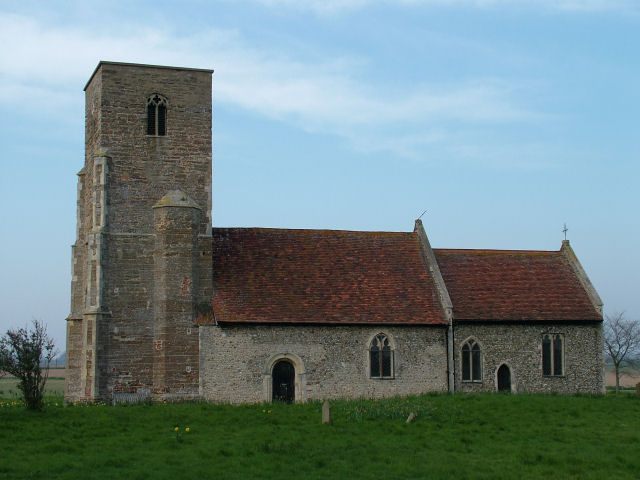
- Church of St John the Baptist

- Location within Suffolk
- Population: 30 (2001)
- District: East Suffolk
- Shire county: Suffolk
- Region: East
- Country: England
- Sovereign state: United Kingdom
- Post town: Woodbridge
- Postcode district: IP12
- Police: Suffolk
- Fire: Suffolk
- Ambulance: East of England
- UK Parliament: Suffolk Coastal

Wantisden is a small village and civil parish in the East Suffolk district of Suffolk in eastern England. Largely consisting of a single farm and ancient woodland (Staverton Park and The Thicks), most of its 30 residents live on the farm estate. It shares a parish council with nearby Butley and Capel St. Andrew. It has a church dedicated to St John the Baptist.

The place-name 'Wantisden' is first attested in the Domesday Book of 1086, where it appears as Wantesdena and Wantesdana. The name means 'Want's dene or valley'.
