= Bishop of Penrydd =

Anglican suffragan bishop in Wales

The Bishop of Penrydd (originally spelled Penreth) was a suffragan see in the Church of England (then covering England and Wales) named in the Suffragan Bishops Act 1534.

Only one bishop was appointed by Robert Holgate, Bishop of Llandaff from 1537 until 1539. The holder John Bird went on to be Bishop of Bangor and then Chester.

An Inventory of Ancient Monuments explains how the establishment of the see may have come about.

Penrydd was subsequently (until 1974) a parish in Cilgerran Hundred.

== Sources ==
- Richard Copsey, ‘Bird, John (d. 1558)’, Oxford Dictionary of National Biography, Oxford University Press, September 2004; online edn, January 2008 accessed 12 August 2008
