= Thomas Manning (bishop) =

Tudor prior and bishop

Thomas Manning was a Tudor Prior and Bishop.

== Life ==
Elected Prior of Butley, Suffolk in 1528, and Suffragan Bishop of Ipswich in 1536, he had to surrender these offices in 1538 having fallen foul of Thomas Cromwell; after which he was appointed Master of Mettingham College. His will dated 1545, and proved 1546, indicates that his wife pre-deceased him.
