= Butley, Suffolk =

Village in Suffolk, England

Coordinates: 52.107°N 1.458°E

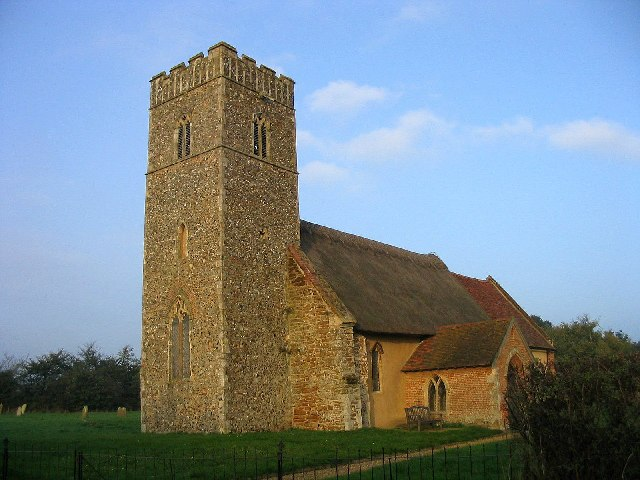
- Butley Parish Church

- Location within Suffolk
- Population: 383 (Including Chillesford and Wantisden 2011)
- OS grid reference: TM368510
- District: East Suffolk
- Shire county: Suffolk
- Region: East
- Country: England
- Sovereign state: United Kingdom
- Post town: Woodbridge
- Postcode district: IP12

Butley is a village and civil parish in the English county of Suffolk.

Butley lies 7 1/2 miles (12 km) east of the town of Woodbridge on the B1084 (Orford) road. Administratively, Butley forms part of the East Suffolk district; from 1934 to 1974 it had been part of the former Deben Rural District, and then from 1974 to 2019 it had been part of the former Suffolk Coastal District Council.

== History ==
Butle was formerly an exclave of Loes Hundred, one of the Hundreds of Suffolk.

The parish church of St John the Baptist dates from the 12th century, but was much restored in 1868. It is a grade II* listed building.

== Butley Priory ==
Butley Priory was a religious institution established founded in 1171 by Ranulph de Glanvill. At that time nearby Orford was a major town. It was suppressed in 1538 during the dissolution of the monasteries.
