= Suffragan bishop =

Administrator of a non-metropolitan diocese in some Christian denominations

A suffragan bishop is a type of bishop in some Christian denominations.

In the Catholic Church, a suffragan bishop leads a diocese within an ecclesiastical province other than the principal diocese, the metropolitan archdiocese; the diocese led by the suffragan is called a suffragan diocese.

In the Anglican Communion, a suffragan bishop is a bishop who is subordinate to a metropolitan bishop or diocesan bishop (bishop ordinary) and so is not normally jurisdictional in their role. Suffragan bishops may be charged by a metropolitan to oversee a suffragan diocese and may be assigned to areas which do not have a cathedral.

== Catholic Church ==
In the Catholic Church, a suffragan is a bishop who heads a diocese. His suffragan diocese, however, is part of a larger ecclesiastical province, nominally led by a metropolitan archbishop. The distinction between metropolitans and suffragans is of limited practical importance. Both are diocesan bishops possessing ordinary jurisdiction over their individual sees. The metropolitan has few responsibilities over the suffragans in his province and no direct authority over the faithful outside of his own diocese. However, he is competent to conduct pastoral visits and he can perform sacred functions, as if he were a bishop in his own diocese in all churches of the Metropolitan province, but he is first to inform the diocesan bishop if the church is the cathedral.

Bishops who assist diocesan bishops are usually called auxiliary bishops. If the assisting bishop has special faculties (typically the right to succeed the diocesan bishop) he would be called a coadjutor bishop. Since they are not in charge of a suffragan diocese, they are not referred to as "suffragan bishops".

== Anglican Communion ==
In the Anglican Communion, the term applies to a bishop who is assigned responsibilities to support a diocesan bishop. For example, the bishop of Jarrow is a suffragan to the diocesan bishop of Durham. Suffragan bishops in the Anglican Communion are nearly identical in their role as auxiliary bishops in the Catholic Church.

=== England ===
==== History ====
English diocesan bishops were commonly assisted by bishops who had been consecrated to sees which were in partibus infidelium before the English Reformation. The separation of the English Church from Rome meant that this was no longer possible. The Suffragan Bishops Act 1534 allowed for the creation of new sees to allow these assistant bishops, who were named as suffragan. Before then, the term suffragan referred to diocesan bishops in relation to their metropolitan, as it still does in the Catholic Church. The first bishops consecrated under that Act were Thomas Manning, bishop of Ipswich, and John Salisbury, bishop of Thetford, on 19 March 1536.

The last Tudor suffragan bishop in post was John Sterne, bishop of Colchester, who died in post in 1607/8. No more suffragans were appointed for more than 250 years, until the consecration of Henry Mackenzie as bishop of Nottingham on 2 February 1870. At that point, the sees of suffragans were still limited to the 26 towns named in the 1534 Act; the Suffragans Nomination Act 1888 allowed the creation of new suffragan sees besides the 26 so named. The appointment of bishops suffragan became much more common thereafter.

==== Today ====
===== Area bishops =====
Some Church of England suffragan bishops are legally delegated responsibility by the diocesan bishop for a specific geographical area within the diocese. Such formal arrangements were piloted by the experimental London scheme in 1970. For example, the Bishop of Colchester is an area bishop in the Diocese of Chelmsford. Such area schemes are presently found in the dioceses of:

- London (since 1979): Two Cities (overseen by the diocesan), Edmonton, Kensington, Stepney, Willesden.
- Chelmsford (since 1983): Barking, Bradwell, Colchester.
- Oxford (since 1984): Oxford (overseen by the diocesan), Buckingham, Dorchester, Reading.
- Southwark (since 1991): Croydon, Kingston, Woolwich.
- Lichfield (since 1992): Shrewsbury, Stafford, Wolverhampton.
- Leeds (since 2014): Bradford, Huddersfield, Leeds (overseen by the Bishop of Kirkstall), Ripon, Wakefield.

Area schemes have previously existed in Worcester diocese (1993–2002; Worcester (overseen by the diocesan), Dudley), Salisbury diocese (1981–2009; Ramsbury, Sherborne), Lincoln diocese (2010 – 31 January 2013; Grantham, Grimsby) and Chichester diocese (1984–2013; Chichester (overseen by the diocesan), Lewes, Horsham). Other suffragans have or have had informal responsibility for geographical areas (e.g. in Winchester, Peterborough, and York), but these are not referred to as area bishops.

===== Suffragan bishops =====
Only the small dioceses of Portsmouth and of Sodor and Man do not have a suffragan bishop. Until 2016/2017, the dioceses of Newcastle and of Leicester each had a stipendiary assistant bishop instead of suffragans, but these have since been replaced with suffragan bishops. The Diocese of Truro has had at some periods an assistant bishop; these have included John Wellington (formerly bishop of Shantung) and Bill Lash, both retired from sees abroad.

===== Provincial episcopal visitors =====
Suffragan bishops in the Church of England who have oversight of parishes and clergy that reject the ministry of priests who are women, usually across a whole province, are known as provincial episcopal visitors (PEVs) (or "flying bishops"). This concession was made in 1992 following the General Synod's vote to ordain women to the priesthood. The first PEV was John Gaisford, bishop of Beverley, who was consecrated on 7 March 1994.

=== Wales ===
The Church in Wales has had suffragan bishops since its time as part of the Church of England and continuing after its disestablishment in 1920. An early example was the suffragan see of Penrydd, established in 1537 with one holder, John Bird. The Bishop of Swansea was a suffragan see in the Diocese of St Davids from 1890 until the establishment of the Diocese of Swansea and Brecon in 1923. This meant that Edward Bevan was the first suffragan bishop in the disestablished Church in Wales. Since disestablishment, there has been only one other bishop described as a suffragan. Thomas Lloyd was appointed suffragan Bishop of Maenan in the Diocese of St Asaph in 1928, when the bishop diocesan was also Archbishop of Wales.

=== United States ===
Suffragan bishops are fairly common in larger dioceses of the Episcopal Church in the United States of America (ECUSA), but usually have no responsibility for a specific geographical part of a diocese. ECUSA is not within the jurisdiction of the English law that requires diocesan and suffragan bishops to be appointed as bishop to a specific place, and so suffragans are not given the title of any particular city within the diocese. For example, Barbara Harris, the first female bishop in the Anglican Communion, was titled simply Suffragan Bishop of Massachusetts.

Coadjutor and assistant bishops are different episcopal offices than suffragan. A coadjutor is elected by a diocesan convention to become the diocesan bishop (also called "the ordinary") upon the ordinary's retirement. A suffragan is also elected by a convention, but does not automatically succeed the diocesan bishop. However, a suffragan's office does continue in the diocese until he or she chooses to retire. An assistant bishop is appointed by the diocesan bishop, and their office ends when the ordinary who appointed her or him leaves office.

=== Canada ===
Some Anglican Church of Canada suffragan bishops are legally delegated responsibility by the diocesan bishop for a specific geographical area within the diocese.

- Toronto: York-Scarborough, York-Credit Valley, Trent-Durham, York-Simcoe.

=== Malaysia (Diocese of West Malaysia) ===
The Diocese of West Malaysia is divided into two "area dioceses", each with their own suffragan bishop.

=== Acting bishops ===
It is common for Anglican suffragan or assistant bishops to serve as acting bishop during a vacancy in the diocesan see (e.g., between the death or retirement of the bishop diocesan and their successor taking post). In order to achieve this, the metropolitan bishop commissions a suffragan/assistant (usually the full-time bishop senior by consecration) who becomes the episcopal commissary, but may be referred to by any number of phrases (since the commission is held from the metropolitan archbishop, she may be called archbishop's commissary; the most usual current term in the Church of England being Acting Bishop of Somewhere). In the Anglican Church of Australia, someone (not always a bishop) acting as diocesan bishop is the administrator of the diocese and a bishop so commissioned is called the bishop administrator.

In 2013, between the retirement of Nigel McCulloch and the confirmation of David Walker as bishop of Manchester, both of that diocese's suffragan bishops (Chris Edmondson, bishop of Bolton, and Mark Davies, bishop of Middleton, who were consecrated on the same day, therefore neither had seniority) served as acting bishop co-equally. In 2014–2015, during the vacancy between the episcopates of Paul Butler and Paul Williams, the diocese's sole suffragan bishop, Tony Porter, bishop of Sherwood, became acting bishop of Southwell and Nottingham; however, when he resigned the commission due to ill health, Richard Inwood (retired bishop of Bedford and an honorary assistant bishop of the diocese) was commissioned Acting Bishop for a fixed one-year term.

== See also ==
- Assistant bishop – Bishop who assists the diocesan bishop or Ordinary
- Auxiliary bishop – High-ranking member of the Christian clergy
- Chorbishop – Rank of Christian clergy
- Coadjutor bishop – High-ranking member of the Christian clergy
