= Armorial of bishops of Chester =

Arms of the Diocese, with which individual bishops' arms may be impaled: Gules three mitres with their lables Or.

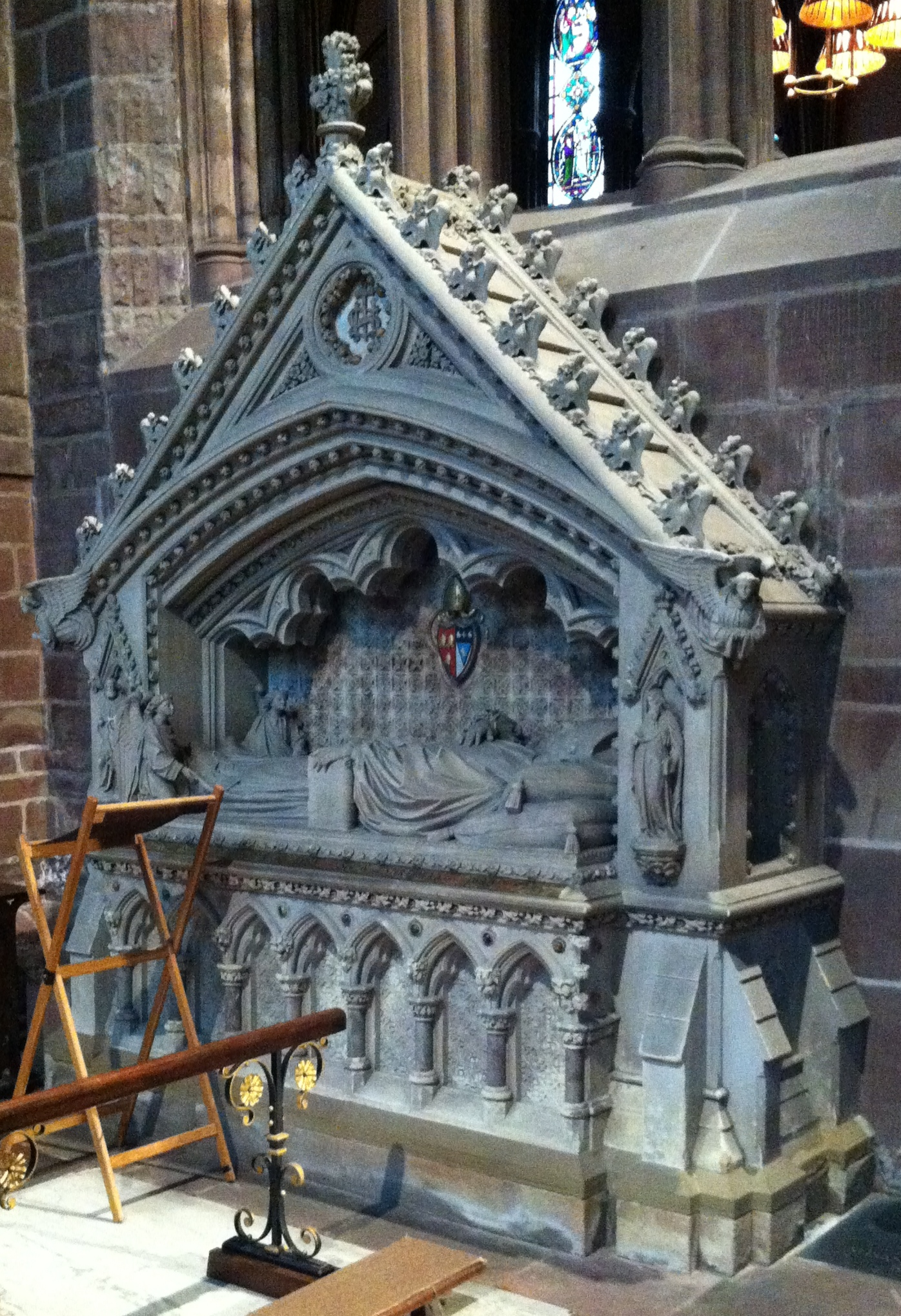
John Graham's arms displayed on his memorial in the cathedral.

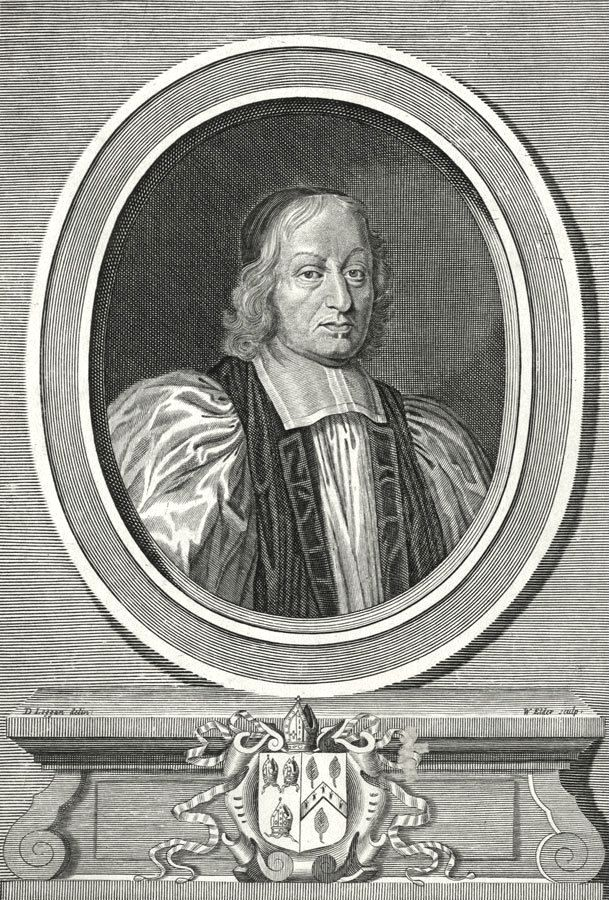
1682 engraving of John Pearson, showing his arms impaling the bishopric's.

== Bishops appointed by the Tudors ==
Arms	Name of Bishop and heraldic blazon
	John Bird, Bishop 1542–1554 Escutcheon: Sable a mace Or in bend surmounted of a pastoral staff in bend sinister Argent headed Or on a chief Argent three shovellers also Argent.
	George Cotes, Bishop 1554–1555 Escutcheon: Argent fretty Azure on a canton Or a lion rampant Sable.
	Cuthbert Scott, Bishop 1556–1559 Escutcheon: Argent a chevron between three pelicans' heads erased at the neck Sable.
	William Downham, Bishop 1561–1577 Escutcheon: Azure on a chevron between two doves Argent beaks and legs Gules and a wolf's head erased Argent in base a rose between two books Gules clasped Or.
	William Chaderton, Bishop 1579–1595 Escutcheon: Quarterly 1st & 4th Gules a cross potent Or 2nd & 3rd Argent a chevron between three crampirons Gules.
	Hugh Bellot, Bishop 1595–1596 Escutcheon: Or on a chief Gules three cinquefoils of the first.
	Richard Vaughan, Bishop 1597–1604 Escutcheon: Sable a chevron between three fleur-de-lis Argent.

== Bishops appointed by the Stuarts ==
Arms	Name of Bishop and heraldic blazon
	George Lloyd, Bishop 1604–1615 Escutcheon: Sable three horses' heads couped Argent.
	Thomas Morton, Bishop 1616–1619 Escutcheon: Quarterly Gules and Ermine in dexter chief and sinister base a goat's head erased Argent attired Or a fleur-de-lis in a crescent in fess point.
	John Bridgeman, Bishop 1619–1646 Escutcheon: Sable, ten plates in pile on a chief Argent a lion passant also Sable.
	Brian Walton, Bishop 1660–1661 Escutcheon: Three geese passant close. (Tinctures unknown)
	Henry Ferne, Bishop 1662 Escutcheon: Party per bend indented Argent and Gules a crescent for difference.
	George Hall, Bishop 1662–1668 Escutcheon: Sable three talbots' heads erased Argent langued Gules.
	John Wilkins, Bishop 1668–1672 Escutcheon: Argent on a pale engrailed cotised plain Sable, three martlets Or.
	John Pearson, Bishop 1673–1686 Escutcheon: Argent a chevron Erminois between three leaves Vert.
	Thomas Cartwright, Bishop 1686–1689 Escutcheon: Ermine a fess Sable between three fireballs inflamed. Crest: A wolf's head erased Or pierced through the neck with a spear Argent. Motto: Defend The Fold
	Nicholas Stratford, Bishop 1689–1707 Escutcheon: Gules a fess humetty Or between three tressels Argent.
	Sir William Dawes, Bishop 1708–1714 Escutcheon: Argent on a bend Azure cotised Gules between six battle axes Sable three swans Or.
	Francis Gastrell, Bishop 1714–1725 Escutcheon: Chequy Argent and Sable on a chief Or three bucks' heads couped of the second. Crest: A lion's head erased Proper gorged with a chaplet Vert.

== Bishops appointed by the Hanoverians ==
Arms	Name of Bishop and heraldic blazon
	Samuel Peploe, Bishop 1726–1752 Escutcheon: Azure on a chevron counter-embattled between three stringed bugle-horns Or a mitre with labels of the first.
	Edmund Keene, Bishop 1752–1771 Escutcheon: Argent a talbot passant Sable collared Or on a chief indented Azure three crosslets of the third.
	William Markham, Bishop 1771–1776 Escutcheon: Azure on a chief Or a lion issuant Gules.
	Beilby Porteus, Bishop 1776–1787 Escutcheon: Azure a book Or between two mullets in chief and a saltire humetty in base Argent.
	William Cleaver, Bishop 1788–1800 Escutcheon: Sable two bars between three castles masoned Or. Crest: A lion's gamb couped Or grasping a key Sable.
	Henry Majendie, Bishop 1800–1809 Escutcheon: Or on a mount Vert a tree between a serpent erect and a dove close Proper.
	Bowyer Sparke, Bishop 1810–1812 Escutcheon: Chequy Or and Vert a bend Ermine. Crest: Out of a ducal coronet Or a demi-panther rampant guardant Argent spotted with various colours fire issuing from the ears and mouth Proper.
	George Henry Law, Bishop 1812–1824 Escutcheon: Argent on a bend engrailed between two cocks Gules three pierced mullets of the first.
	Charles James Blomfield, Bishop 1824–1828 Escutcheon: Quarterly per fess indented Or and Azure a bend Gules.
	John Bird Sumner, Bishop 1828–1848 Escutcheon: Ermine two chevrons Gules. Crest: A lion's head erased Argent ducally gorged Or.
	John Graham, Bishop 1848–1865 Escutcheon: Argent on a pile Azure a dove close bearing in her beak an olive branch Proper on a chief Sable a cross potent Argent between two escallops Or.
	William Jacobson, Bishop 1865–1884 Escutcheon: Argent a chevron Gules between three trefoils slipped Sable on a chief also Sable an estoile Silver.
	William Stubbs, Bishop 1884–1889 Escutcheon: Sable on a bend nebuly Or between two bezants each charged with a pheon also Sable three buckles Proper.
	Francis Jayne, Bishop 1889–1919 No arms known.

== Bishops appointed by the Windsors ==
Alive
Incumbent

Arms	Name of Bishop and heraldic blazon
	Luke Paget, Bishop 1919–1932 Escutcheon: Sable on a cross engrailed between in the first and fourth quarters an eagle displayed and in the second and third an heraldic tyger passant Argent an escallop also Sable.
	Geoffrey Fisher (later Baron Fisher of Lambeth), Bishop 1932–1939 Escutcheon: Argent a fess wavy between three fleur-de-lys Sable. Crest: A king's fisher Proper holding in the dexter claw a fleur-de-lys Sable.
	Douglas Crick, Bishop 1939–1955 No arms known.
	Gerald Ellison, Bishop 1955–1973 No arms known.
	Victor Whitsey, Bishop 1974–1981 No arms known.
	Michael Baughen, Bishop 1982–1996 No arms known.
	Peter Forster, Bishop 1996–2019 No arms known.
	Keith Sinclair, acting Bishop 2019–2020 No arms known.
	Mark Tanner, Bishop since 2020 No arms known.
