= Robert Mitchell =

Robert Mitchell may refer to:

== Arts and entertainment ==
- Robert Mitchell (engraver) (1820–1873), English engraver
- Robert Boyed Mitchell (1919–2002), Australian painter
- Robert Mitchell (jazz pianist) (born 1971), British jazz pianist and composer
- Robert Mitchell (organist) (1912–2009), American organist and silent film accompanist
- Robert Mitchell, a minor character in Marvel Comics

== Politics ==
=== Australia ===
- Rob Mitchell (Queensland politician) (born 1948), member of the Queensland Legislative Assembly
- Rob Mitchell (Victorian politician) (born 1967), member of the Australian House of Representatives

=== Canada ===
- Robert Mitchell (Prince Edward Island politician) (born 1963), local Canadian politician
- Robert C. Mitchell (1931–2007), politician in Ontario, Canada
- Bob Mitchell (Saskatchewan politician) (1936–2016), lawyer, civil servant and politician in Saskatchewan, Canada
- Robert Weld Mitchell (1915–1994), lawyer, member of the Canadian House of Commons for Ontario

=== New Zealand ===
- Robert Mitchell (New Zealand politician), elected 1868, from Otago, New Zealand

=== United Kingdom ===
- Robert James Mitchell (1912–1998), MP in the Northern Ireland Parliament for North Armagh
- Robert MacGregor Mitchell, Lord MacGregor Mitchell (1875–1938), British member of parliament

=== United States ===
- Robert Mitchell (congressman) (1778–1848), member of the US House of Representatives from Ohio
- Robert Mitchell (Wisconsin politician) (1826–1899), Wisconsin legislator
- Robert Byington Mitchell (1823–1882), governor of New Mexico territory and Civil War general

== Sports ==
- Robert Mitchell (baseball) (1900–1971), American Negro league baseball player
- Robert Mitchell (canoeist) (born 1949), American canoer
- Robert Mitchell (cricketer) (1863–1926), Australian cricketer
- Robert Mitchell (high jumper) (born 1980), British high jumper
- Rob Mitchell (rower) (born 1976), Australian lightweight rower
- Robert Mitchell (speed skater) (1972–2022), British Olympic speed skater
- Robert Mitchell (water polo) (1913–1996), British water polo player and later Conservative member of the Greater London Council
- Robert Mitchell (weightlifter) (1911–1992), American Olympic weightlifter

== Other ==
- Robert A. Mitchell (1926–2006), American Jesuit
- Robert Mitchell (priest) (1870–1949), Dean of Lincoln, 1930–1949
- Robert Mitchell (Presbyterian minister) (1851–1929), became the first Presbyterian to be ordained in South Australia
- Robert Menzies Mitchell (1865–1932), physician and political figure in Saskatchewan, Canada
- Robert W. Mitchell (1933–2010), American invertebrate zoologist and photographer
- Robert Edward Mitchell, American historian
- Robert Lyell Mitchell (1910–1982), Scottish chemist and mountaineer
- Robert Mitchell (architect), Scottish architect
- Robert Mitchell (geologist), American geologist
- Robert Matthew Mitchell (1847–1949), Scottish architect

== See also ==
- Bobby Mitchell (disambiguation)
- Bob Mitchell (disambiguation)
- Bert Mitchell (disambiguation)
- Robert Michell (disambiguation)
