= List of masters of Christ's College, Cambridge =

The head of Christ's College is termed the "Master". Christ's grew from God's House, an institution founded in 1437 on land now occupied by King's College Chapel. It received its first royal licence in 1446. It moved to its present site in 1448 when it received its second royal licence. It was renamed Christ's College and received its present charter in 1505 when it was endowed and expanded by Lady Margaret Beaufort, mother of King Henry VII. The last Proctor of God's House, John Sickling, became the first Master of the new college.

== List of masters ==
- 1505–1507 John Sickling
- 1507–1510 Richard Wyot
- 1510–1517 Thomas Thompson
- 1517–1530 John Watson
- 1530–1548 Henry Lockwood
- 1548–1553 Richard Wilkes
- 1553–1556 Cuthbert Scott
- 1556–1559 William Taylor
- 1559–1582 Edward Hawford
- 1582–1609 Edmund Barwell
- 1609–1622 Valentine Cary
- 1622–1646 Thomas Bainbridge
- 1646–1654 Samuel Bolton
- 1654–1688 Ralph Cudworth
- 1688–1722 John Covel
- 1723–1745 William Towers
- 1745–1754 George Henry Rooke
- 1754–1780 Hugh Thomas
- 1780–1808 John Barker
- 1808–1814 Thomas Browne
- 1814–1830 John Kaye
- 1830–1848 John Graham
- 1849–1849 Joseph Shaw
- 1849–1881 James Cartmell
- 1881–1887 Charles Anthony Swainson
- 1887–1910 John Peile
- 1910–1927 Sir Arthur Shipley
- 1927–1936 Norman McLean
- 1936–1939 Charles Galton Darwin
- 1939–1950 Charles Raven
- 1950–1963 Brian Downs
- 1963–1978 The Lord Todd
- 1978–1982 Sir John H. Plumb
- 1982–1995 Sir Hans Kornberg
- 1995–2002 Alan Munro
- 2002–2006 Malcolm Bowie
- 2006–2016 Frank Kelly
- 2016–2022 Jane Stapleton
- 2022 (incumbent) Simon McDonald, Baron McDonald of Salford
