= Michell =

Michell is a surname. Notable people with the surname include:

- Anthony Michell (1870–1959), Australian mechanical engineer
- Bert S. Michell (c.1882–1938), American horse racing trainer
- Charles Collier Michell (1793–1851), British soldier and South African public servant
- Chris Michell (born 1951), English flautist and composer
- Edith Michell (1872–1951), English chess master
- Edward Michell (1843–1926), English rower and barrister
- Edward Michell (cricketer) (1853–1900), English batsman
- Frederick Thomas Michell (1788–1873) Royal Navy admiral and mayor of Totnes
- Helena Michell (born 1963), Australian actress
- Howard Michell (1913–2012), Australian wool merchant, industrialist and philanthropist
- John Michell (disambiguation)
  - John Michell (1724–1793), English natural philosopher and geologist
  - John Michell (writer) (1933–2009), English author on esotericism
  - John Henry Michell (1863–1940), Australian mathematician
- Keith Michell (1928–2015), Australian actor
- Matthew Michell (1705–1752), English politician
- Nicholas Michell (1807–1880), Cornish writer
- Reginald Pryce Michell (1873–1938), English chess master
- Richard Rooke Michell (1810–1872), Cornish mining proprietor
- Robert Michell (disambiguation), several people
  - Robert Michell (MP for Norwich) (died 1563), English politician
  - Robert Michell (MP for Petersfield) (1653–1729), English politician
  - Robert Michell (diplomat) (1876–1956), British minister to Bolivia and Uruguay and ambassador to Chile
  - Robert Williams Michell (1863–1916), British surgeon
- Roger Michell (1956–2021), English theatre, television and film director
- Tony Michell (born 1947), British businessman, entrepreneur, and pioneer for Korean development
- Sampson Michell (1755–1809) British admiral of Portuguese navy, father of Charles and Frederick
- Tris Vonna Michell (born 1982), British artist
- William Michell (1796–1872), British physician and Member of Parliament

== See also ==
- Michell solution, a general solution to the elasticity equations in polar coordinates
- Michell turbine, a water turbine
