= Robert Michell =

Robert Michell may refer to:

- Robert Michell (MP for Norwich) (died 1563), English politician
- Robert Michell (MP for Petersfield) (1653–1729), English politician
- Robert Michell (diplomat) (1876–1956), British minister to Bolivia and Uruguay and ambassador to Chile
- Robert Williams Michell (1863–1916), British surgeon

== See also ==
- Robert Mitchell (disambiguation)
- Michell
