= Downham =

Downham may refer to:

== Places ==
in England

- Downham, Cambridgeshire, a civil parish
  - Little Downham
- Downham, Essex
- Downham, Lancashire
- Downham, London, a district of south east London
  - Downham Estate, housing estate in Downham, London
  - Downham (ward), electoral ward
- Downham, a common name of Downham Market, Norfolk
- Downham West, Norfolk
- Downham, South Norfolk
- Downham, Northumberland

== People with the surname ==
- George Downham (1560-1634), bishop of Derry
- Jenny Downham (born 1964), British novelist
- John Downham (1571-1652), English clergyman
- William Downham (1511–1577), bishop of Chester
- E. E. Downham (1839–1921), American politician

== Other uses ==
- Downham (1795 cricketer), an English cricketer
- HMS Downham, a minesweeper

== See also ==
- Donham, a surname
