= Bob Mitchell =

Bob Mitchell may refer to:

== Sports ==
- Bob Mitchell (American football) (1922–1997), American football player
- Bob Mitchell (baseball) (1932–2019), American baseball player
- Bob Mitchell (footballer), Scottish footballer
- Bob Mitchell (rugby league), New Zealand rugby league player
- Bob Mitchell (weightlifter), American weightlifter

== Politicians ==
- Bob Mitchell (British politician) (1927–2003), British Labour (and then SDP) Member of Parliament for Southampton Itchen and Southampton Test
- Bob Mitchell (Saskatchewan politician) (1936–2016), lawyer and political figure in Saskatchewan, Canada
- Bob Mitchell (television writer) (1918–1992), American television writer
- Bob Mitchell (Ontario politician) (1931–2007), MPP and Ontario Cabinet Minister

== Other ==
- Robert "Bob" Mitchell (geologist), Distinguished Professor in geology at Western Washington University

== See also ==
- Bobby Mitchell (disambiguation)
- Robert Mitchell (disambiguation)
