= Isaac Newton University Lodge =

Masonic Lodge based at the University of Cambridge

Isaac Newton University Lodge No 859 is a Masonic Lodge based at the University of Cambridge for matriculated members of the university. As of 2026 there were approximately 130 members. This is compared to the 397 subscribing members in 1955. The lodge meets at Bateman Street Masonic Hall, with the lodge's badge or standard a combination of Isaac Newton's coat of arms and the University of Cambridge's coat of arms. The lodge is also a member of the Association of Medical, university, and Legal Lodges.

== History ==
Isaac Newton University Lodge (INUL) was formally consecrated as lodge No 1161 at the Red Lion Hotel, Cambridge, on 21 May 1861, where the Duke of St Albans was installed as the first Worshipful Master of the lodge. Members of the university had previously joined Scientific Lodge, the oldest in Cambridge. In both lodges court uniform and dress is still worn at meetings by officers of the lodge. In 1961 the centenary meeting of the lodge was held at Cambridge Guildhall attended by the then Grand Master, Roger Lumley, 11th Earl of Scarbrough, who was made an honorary member of the lodge. INUL and Apollo University Lodge (at the University of Oxford) were the founding members of the United Grand Lodge of England Universities Scheme in 2005.

== Character ==
The lodge, as well as its equivalent Apollo University Lodge at the University of Oxford, enjoys the right to initiate matriculated members of the university from the age of 18, whereas other Lodges in England and Wales are restricted to candidates aged 21 or older, except by special permission. In 2005 the Universities Scheme was established, inspired by the long success of Apollo University Lodge and Isaac Newton University Lodge, allowing other university masonic lodges across England and Wales (together with some overseas) to share established best practice. The scheme now numbers more than eighty member lodges.

== Other lodges ==
Isaac Newton Lodge is the principal masonic lodge for members of the University of Cambridge, although Alma Mater Lodge No 1492 accepts those with more than five years since matriculation, primarily from Oxbridge. Lodge of Trinity No 5765 is for members of Trinity College, Caius No 3355 is for members of Gonville and Caius College, Saint Mary Magdalene No 1523 is for members of Magdalene College, and Lady Margaret Lodge No 4729 is for members of St John's College. The Oxford and Cambridge Lodge No 1118 (consecrated 1866) is a London-based lodge for members of both universities, also accepting a proportion of members from other universities.

Euclid Chapter No. 859 is a Holy Royal Arch Chapter associated with the lodge. There is also a lodge of Mark Master Masons as well as a Royal Ark Mariners Lodge for members of Cambridge University, which are both also named Isaac Newton University Lodge.

== Notable members ==
- Samuel Allsopp, 2nd Baron Hindlip, Conservative politician
- Sir Edward Victor Appleton, Nobel Prize winner (1947)
- William Beauclerk, 10th Duke of St Albans
- Clarence Bicknell, vicar and archaeologist
- Edward Buxton, conservationist
- Robert Caldwell, Academic
- Frank Osmond Carr, English composer
- James Cartmell, Master of Christ's College, Cambridge
- Victor Cavendish, 9th Duke of Devonshire
- Arthur Daniel, cricketer
- F. J. Foakes-Jackson, Church Historian and Dean of Jesus College, Cambridge
- John Stanley Gardiner, zoologist
- Joseph Reynolds Green, botanist and chemist
- Everard Hambro, banker
- Charles Edward Keyser, prominent financier
- Ron Larking, Australian rules footballer
- Alwin Corden Larmour, Editor of The London Philatelist
- James Lindsay 26th Earl of Crawford
- Roger Lumley, 11th Earl of Scarbrough
- Marcus Martin, cricketer
- Robert Williams Michell, First World War surgeon
- Waller de Montmorency, Anglican priest
- Charles Samuel Myers, co-founder of the British Psychological Society
- Mark Napier, Scottish Liberal Party Member of Parliament for Roxburghshire
- Augustus Henry Novelli, physician
- Alexander Onslow, Australian jurist
- Sir Cuthbert Peek, astronomer and meteorologist
- Ranjitsinhji, Indian Prince and Test Cricketer
- Frederick Margetson Rushmore, Master of St. Catharine's College, Cambridge
- John Russell, Viscount Amberley, Liberal politician
- Thomas Stevens, Bishop of Barking
- Henry Thirkill, Master of Clare College, Cambridge
- Sir George Trevelyan, 2nd Baronet, Liberal Party statesman and author
- Alexander Todd, British Isles and England Rugby Union player
- Christopher Vane, 10th Baron Barnard
- John Vereker, 6th Viscount Gort
- Arthur Ward, cricketer
- Joseph Wolstenholme, mathematician
- Charles Wynn-Carington, 1st Marquess of Lincolnshire
- Charles Yorke, 5th Earl of Hardwicke
