= Henry Lockwood =

Henry Lockwood may refer to:

- Henry Lockwood (cricketer) (1855–1930), English cricketer
- Henry Lockwood (Master of Christ's College, Cambridge) (died 1555), priest and academic
- Henry Whilden Lockwood (1891–1944), mayor of Charleston, South Carolina
- Henry Francis Lockwood (1811–1878), English architect
- Henry Hayes Lockwood (1814–1899), American soldier and academic
