= Larmour =

Larmour is a surname. Notable people by that name include:

- Albert Larmour (born 1951), former Northern Irish professional footballer.
- Alwin Corden Larmour (1886–1946), British churchman, school teacher and philatelist.
- Davy Larmour (boxer) (born 1949), former boxer from Northern Ireland.
- Davy Larmour (footballer) (born 1977), retired football player.
- Jordan Larmour (born 1997), Irish rugby player.
- Noel Larmour (1916-1999), Irish cricketer and politician.
