= James Cartmell =

James Cartmell may refer to:

- James Cartmell (academic), master of Christ's College, Cambridge
- James Cartmell (actor), English actor
