= Orit Halpern =

American historian

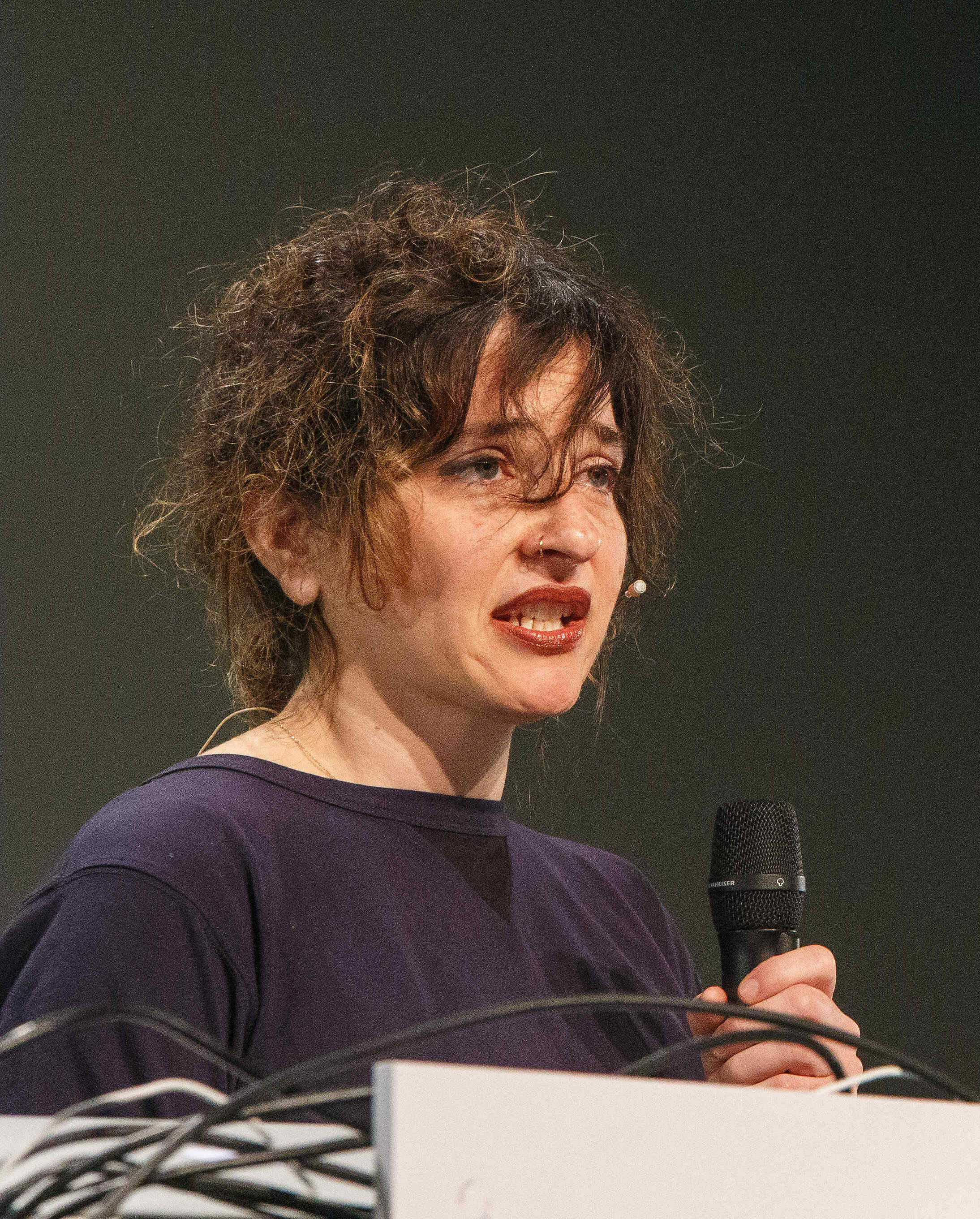
- Halpern in 2018
- Occupations: Academic, Researcher

Orit Halpern is an American historian and media theorist. She is known for her research on cybernetics, data, infrastructure, smart technologies and artificial intelligence. She is Lighthouse Professor and Chair of Digital Cultures at TU Dresden, and is the author of two monographs. Her first, Beautiful Data: A History of Vision and Reason, traces a history of big data and interactivity, holding that attention, observation and truth are historically situated, conditional and contingent. Her second, The Smartness Mandate, co-authored with Robert Edward Mitchell, argues that the push to embed computation, “smartness,” and AI into every domain of everyday life has become a mandate: a powerful new mode of governing politics, economics, and the environment. This mandate, they show, is not inevitable or natural, but the product of historical shifts in reason, evolutionary biology, politics, and economic modeling. At the heart of their argument is the claim that AI and smart technologies are not merely technical systems; they are epistemologies—forms of knowledge that shape how reality is perceived, organized, and governed. Halpern is involved in several research groups, including Governing Through Design, which uses history and ethnography methods to explore how design influences global politics and perspectives, and Against Catastrophe, which interrogates the concept of catastrophe and drawing on the field of futures studies, develops anti-catastrophic practices to envision alternative futures. She also currently co-directs the Schaufler Laboratory a graduate kolleg bridging the arts, humanities, and sciences.

Halpern completed her PhD at Harvard University in 2006 with a dissertation titled Screen-Memories: Temporality, Perception, and the Archive in Cybernetic Thought, where she produced a genealogy of interactivity by excavating the relationship between the archive and the interface in digital systems, using cybernetics as a departure point. Here, Halpern related contemporary practices in archiving and interactivity to modernist concerns with temporality, representation and memory.
