= Richard Wyot =

Richard Wyot may refer to:

- Richard Wyot (priest, died 1463), Canon of Windsor
- Richard Wyot (priest, died 1522), Master of Christ's College, Cambridge
