= John Ley (clergyman) =

English clergyman (1583–1662)

John Ley (4 February 1583 – 16 May 1662) was an English clergyman and member of the Westminster Assembly.

== Life ==
He was born in Warwick and received his early education at the free school in that town. On 12 February 1602, he entered Christ Church, Oxford, and graduated B.A. (23 October 1605) and M.A. (30 May 1606). Taking holy orders he was presented to the vicarage of Great Budworth, Cheshire, in 1616. He subsequently became sub-dean of Chester and Friday lecturer in St. Peter's Church in the same city, and in 1627 was made a prebendary of Chester Cathedral.

At the outbreak of the First English Civil War between Charles I and the parliament he sided with the latter, came to occupy an important place in their ecclesiastical arrangements, and was an energetic pamphleteer. In 1643 he took the solemn league and covenant, was appointed a member of the Westminster Assembly of Divines, and regularly attended its sessions. He was made examiner in Latin to the Assembly, and chairman of two of its important committees. In 1645 he was elected president of Sion College, and in the same year the sequestered rectories of St. Mary-at-Hill, London, and of Charlwood, Surrey, were made over to him. He was instituted rector of Ashfield and of Astbury in Cheshire in 1646. He drew up the 'Cheshire Attestation' in 1648, and his name is the first of the fifty-nine appended to it. When Edward Hyde was ejected from the rectory of Brightwell, Berkshire, Ley succeeded him. He refused to pay Hyde any part of his income.

In 1653 he was appointed one of the 'triers for the approbation of ministers.' He subsequently obtained from Sir Simon Archer of Umberslade Hall the rectory of Solihull, Warwickshire. After some years there his health gave way, and resigning his benefices he went to live at Sutton Coldfield, where he died on 16 May 1662. He was buried in the church of Sutton Coldfield.

== Works ==
The following are his main works:

- An Apology in Defence of the Geneva Notes on the Bible (written circa 1612).
- A Patterne of Pietie, or the Religious life and death of that grave and gracious Matron, Mrs. Jane Ratcliffe, Widow, and Citizen of Chester, 1640.
- Sunday a Sabbath, or a preparative Discourse for discussion of Sabbatary doubts, 1641.
- The Christian Sabbath maintained, in Answer to a book of Dr. Pocklington styled "Sunday no Sabbath." Reply to John Pocklington.
- 'A Letter against the Erection of an Altar,' 1641.
- 'A Case of Conscience concerning the Sacrament of the Lord's Supper,' 1641.
- 'Defensive Doubts, Hopes and Reasons for Refusall of the Oath imposed by the sixth Canon of the late Synod,' 1641.
- 'A Comparison of the Parliamentary Prostestation with the late Canonical Oath,' 1641.
- 'A Discourse concerning Puritans,' 1641.
- 'A Monitor of Mortality,' 1643 (two funeral sermons).
- 'Fury of War and Folly of Sin,' 1643, a sermon.
- 'The New Quere and Determination upon it, by Mr. Saltmarsh ... examined,' 1646.
- 'Apologetical Narrative of the late Petition of the Common Council and Ministers of London,' 1646.
- 'Light for Smoak, or a cleare and distinct Reply to a dark and confused Answer in a book made and entitled "The Smoke in the Temple" by John Saltmarsh,' 1646.
- 'An After-reckoning with Mr. Saltmarsh,' 1646.
- 'Attestation of the Ministers of Cheshire to the Testimony of the Ministers of the Province of London,' 1648.
- 'Elaborate Annotations on the Pentateuch,' 1651.
- 'A Learned Defence for the Legaluty of Tithes,' Oxford, 1653.
- 'General Reasons against the Payment of a fifth part to Sequestered Ministers' Wives and Children ... whereto are added special Reasons against the Payment of a fifth part to Dr. E. H[yde] out of the Rectory of Brightwell,' 1654.
- 'Debate concerning the English Liturgy drawn out in two English and two Latin Epistles, written betwixt Edward Hyde and John Ley,' 1656.
- 'Discourses or Disputations, chiefly concerning matters of Religion,' 1658.
- 'Animadversions on two printed Books of Joh. Onely, a Lay Preacher.'
- 'Equitable and Necessary Considerations for the Association of Arms throughout England and Wales.'
- 'Comparison of the Oath of the Sixth Canon of the last Synod of Bishops and the Protestation set forth by the Parliament, in Answer to a letter of Pedoel Harlow, Gent.'
- 'Exceptions Many and Just, being an Answer to two injurious Petitions against Tithes.'

He was an important contributor to the Westminster Annotations (Annotations upon all the Books of the Old and New Testament, 1645), with Meric Casaubon, John Downame, Daniel Featley, Thomas Gataker, William Gouge, Adam Pemberton, John Reading, Edward Reynolds, and Francis Taylor.
