= John Downame =

English Puritan clergyman and theologian (1571–1652)

John Downame (Downham) (1571–1652) was an English Puritan clergyman and theologian in London, who came to prominence in the 1640s, when he worked closely with the Westminster Assembly. He is now remembered for his writings.

== Life ==
He was the younger son of William Downham, bishop of Chester, and younger brother of George Downame. He was born in Chester, and received his education at The King's School, Chester and Christ's College, Cambridge, as a member of which he subsequently proceeded B.D. On 4 August 1599 he was instituted to the vicarage of St Olave, Jewry, which he exchanged, 5 March 1601, for the rectory of St Margaret, Lothbury, then recently vacated by his brother George, but resigned in June 1618. He would seem to have lived unbeneficed until 30 November 1630, when he became rector of All-Hallows-the-Great, a living he held till his death. He was the first, says Thomas Fuller, who preached the Tuesday lectures in St Bartholomew-by-the-Exchange.

In 1640 he combined with ministers of the city (Cornelius Burgess, Edmund Calamy, John Goodwin and Arthur Jackson) in presenting a petition to the privy council against William Laud's innovative book of canons. In 1643 he was appointed one of the licensers of the press, granting imprimatur to theological works, a role in which he took a permissive line, one of the works he approved being Judgement of Martin Bucer Concerning Divorce by John Milton; his licensing of Eikon Basilike in 1649 attracted the attention of the Council of State. In 1644 he was chosen one of the London ministers to examine and ordain public preachers.

He died at his house at Bunhill, in the parish of St Giles-without-Cripplegate, and was buried in the chancel of All-Hallows-the-Great.

== Works ==
Downame published Thomas Sutton's Lectures upon the Eleventh Chapter to the Romans, London, 1632. He also edited his brother George's Treatise of Prayer, London, 1640, the third impression of J. Heydon's Mans Badnes and Gods Goodnes, London, 1647, and Archbishop James Ussher's Body of Divinitie (attributed), London, 1647.

Downame was commissioned by parliament along with John Ley, William Gouge, Meric Casaubon, Francis Taylor, Daniel Featley, and John Reading, to imitate and supplement the 1637 Dutch Annotations on the Whole Bible as a complement to the work of the Westminster Assembly. With the exceptions of Downame, Casaubon, and Reading, these divines were all members of the Assembly. It is presumed that Downame served as the chief editor and compiler for their work: Annotations upon all the Books of the Old and New Testament, London, 1645. The text came to be known as The Assembly's Annotations or The English Annotations (in distinction from the earlier Dutch).

His own writings comprise:

- Spiritual Physick to Cure the Diseases of the Soul, arising from Superfluitie of Choller, prescribed out of God's Word, London, 1600.
- Lecture on the First Four Chapters of Hosea, London, 1608.
- The Christian Warfare Against the Devil, World and Flesh, 4 parts, London, 1609–18. This is his best-known work, and reached a fourth edition, 4 parts, fol. London, 1634, 33.
- Foure Treatises tending to disswade all Christians from the Abuses of Swearing, Drunkennesse, Whoredome, and Bribery, . . . Whereunto is annexed a Treatise of Anger, 2 parts, London, 1613.
- The Plea of the Poore. Or a Treatise of Beneficence and Almes-deeds: teaching how these Christian duties are rightly to be performed, London, 1616.
- Guide to Godliness, or a Treatise of a Christian Life, London, 1622.
- The Summe of Sacred Divinitie Briefly and Methodically Propounded, . . . more largely and cleerly handled, London (1630?).
- A Brief Concordance to the Bible, . . . alphabetically digested, and allowed by authority to be printed and bound with the Bible in all volumes, London, 1631. Ten editions were published during the author's lifetime.
- A Treatise against Lying, London, 1636.
- A Treatise tending to direct the Weak Christian how he may rightly Celebrate the Sacrament of the Lord's Supper, London, 1645.

== Family ==
He married, after August 1623, Catherine, widow of Thomas Sutton, and daughter of Francis Little, brewer and inn-holder, of Abington, Cambridgeshire, who survived him. He had issue three sons, William, Francis, and George. Of his daughters he mentions Mrs George Staunton, Mrs Sarah Warde, Mrs Jael Harrison, and Mrs Elizabeth Kempe.
