= Charles Beirne =

American academic administrator

Charles J. Beirne S.J.

11th President of Le Moyne College
- In office 2000–2007
- Preceded by: Robert A. Mitchell, S.J.
- Succeeded by: John Smarrelli Jr. (interim)

Personal details
- Born: September 23, 1938 Jersey City, New Jersey, U.S.
- Died: July 14, 2010 (aged 71) Bronx, New York, U.S.
- Profession: Jesuit priest, academic

Charles J. Beirne, S.J. (September 23, 1938 – July 14, 2010) was an American Jesuit and academic administrator. Beirne served as the 11th President of Le Moyne College in Syracuse, New York, from 2000 until 2007. During his seven-year tenure, Beirne oversaw the drafting of a new mission statement, launched in the largest capital campaign in Le Moyne's history, grossing $91 million by June 2010 when the campaign ended, and adopted a twenty-year architectural plan for the campus.

== Biography ==
=== Early life ===
Beirne, a native of Jersey City, New Jersey, was born in 1938. He graduated from St. Peter's Preparatory School in 1956. He received both his bachelor's degree and master's degree in history from Fordham University. He obtained an additional master's degree in theology from Woodstock College in Maryland.

=== Jesuits ===
Beirne was ordained a Jesuit priest in 1969 and began working as an academic administrator. He received a doctorate in education in 1973 from the University of Chicago. He then worked as an administrator at several Jesuit colleges and high schools, including associate dean of the School of Business at Georgetown University and the academic vice president of Santa Clara University. He was headmaster of Regis High School in Manhattan, 1978–1983, and assistant director of the Committee on Research and Development of the Jesuit Secondary Education Association at Fordham University, 1977-1978.

Beirne was accidentally posted to Puerto Rico by the Society of Jesus, his first position in a Spanish-speaking country. Beirne was supposed to move to Jersey City, New Jersey, for his post; however, a second Jesuit named Charles Burns, who was originally supposed to go to Puerto Rico, was transferred to Jersey City instead of Beirne. A friend of Beirne's, Father David Casey, later recalled the mix-up in an interview noting, "there was another Jesuit named Charles Burns, who was supposed to be sent to Puerto Rico while Beirne was heading back to his native Jersey City, N.J...But through some mix up it was announced that Beirne was going and a news story appeared announcing his appointment. So Beirne went to the Caribbean." Beirne served as the principal of Colegio San Ignacio de Loyola in San Juan, Puerto Rico.

=== El Salvador and Guatemala ===
In 1989, six Jesuits were murdered at the Universidad Centroamericana in El Salvador during the height of the Salvadoran Civil War. Beirne volunteered to be transferred to the Universidad Centroamericana following the massacre, where he succeeded the late Ignacio Martín-Baró, S.J., as the Universidad's vice president of academic affairs in 1990. He also became a Latin American affairs advisor to the government of the United States from the post.

Beirne remained at the Universidad Centroamericana for 1990 until 1993 before transferring to Universidad Rafael Landívar in neighboring Guatemala. He served as the vice president of Universidad Rafael Landivar until 2000, when he was appointed president of Le Moyne College.

=== President of Le Moyne College ===
Father Beirne became the 11th President of Le Moyne College in 2000, succeeding Rev. Robert A. Mitchell. During his tenure, Beirne developed a 20-year architectural plan for Le Moyne's campus and adopted the college's new mission statement. Beirne also launched a $50 million capital campaign, the largest fundraiser in Le Moyne history. The capital campaign, which originally aimed to raise $50 million, ultimately grossed $91 million when it ended in June 2010. In addition to his presidency at Le Moyne, Beirne also served on the boards of directors for numerous Syracuse area organizations including the Syracuse Symphony Orchestra, Syracuse 20/20 and the former Greater Syracuse Chamber of Commerce.

Beirne was awarded the Bishop’s Medallion from the Bishop James Michael Moynihan of the Roman Catholic Diocese of Syracuse in 2006. He received an honorary degree from Le Moyne College for work in social justice in 2008.

=== Later life ===
Beirne was transferred from Le Moyne College in 2007 to become a consultant during the establishment of the first Jesuit university in Africa. In 2008 Beirne became a visiting professor at Fordham University’s Graduate School of Education.

Father Charles Beirne died on Wednesday, July 14, 2010, at Murray-Weigel Hall, a Jesuit infirmary at Fordham University in Fordham, the Bronx, New York City. He had been diagnosed with skin cancer in 1993 and had undergone seventeen surgeries since the diagnosis. In June 2010 he announced that he would no longer receive chemotherapy for the disease.
