= George Coote =

George Coote may refer to:

- George Cotes (died 1556), or Coote, English academic and bishop
- George Gibson Coote (1880–1959), Canadian accountant, bank manager, farmer, and federal politician
