= Cuthbert Scott =

English bishop

The Right Reverend Cuthbert Scott
- Bishop of Chester
- Church: Roman Catholic
- Appointed: 6 July 1556
- Term ended: 21 June 1559
- Predecessor: George Cotes
- Successor: William Downham

Personal details
- Died: 9 October 1564; Leuven
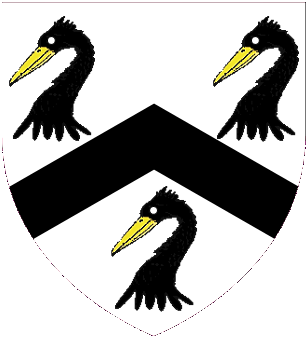
- Coat of arms

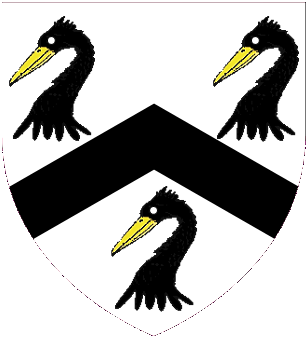
Arms: Argent a chevron between three pelicans' heads erased at the neck Sable.

Cuthbert Scott (or Scot) (died 9 October 1564) was a Catholic academic at the University of Cambridge and Bishop of Chester.

== Cambridge University ==
Scott was made a Fellow of Christ's College, Cambridge in 1537, became M.A. in 1538 and was Master of Christ's College from 1553 to 1556.

In 1554 he became Vice Chancellor of the University of Cambridge.

He became D.D. of Cambridge University in 1547 and of Oxford University in 1554.

== Church positions ==
Scott was appointed prebendary of York and, in 1554, of St Paul's, London. In 1556 he succeeded George Cotes, former Master of Balliol College, Oxford, as Bishop of Chester by papal provision.

On the accession of Elizabeth I he was one of the four Catholic bishops chosen to defend Catholic doctrine at the conference at Westminster, and immediately after this he was sent as a prisoner to the Tower of London and then in the Fleet Prison 1559–1563. Being released on bail, he contrived to escape to the Continent.

He died at Leuven, in what is now Belgium, on 9 October 1564.

Academic offices
Preceded by Richard Wilkes	Master of Christ's College, Cambridge; 1553–1556	Succeeded by William Tayler
Catholic Church titles
Preceded by George Cotes	Bishop of Chester; 1556–1559	Succeeded by William Downham
