= Ron Larking =

Australian rules footballer

Personal information
- Full name: Ronald Guy Larking
- Born: 9 September 1890; Caulfield, Victoria
- Died: 1 April 1918 (aged 27); Neuve-Eglise, Belgium
- Original team: Melbourne Grammar
- Position: Full-forward

Playing career^{1}
Years	Club	Games (Goals)
1909	University	1 (0)
- ^{1} Playing statistics correct to the end of 1909.

Ronald Guy Larking MC & Bar (9 September 1890 – 1 April 1918) was an Australian rules footballer who played with University in the Victorian Football League.

== Family ==
The son of Richard James Larking (1868–1908), and Ethel Maude Larking (1863–1952), née Peterson, Ronald Guy Larking was born in East St Kilda on 9 September 1890. In 1913, he was engaged to Hetty Matthes Alkermande. He died in a motorcycle accident on 1 April 1918.

== Education ==
He attended Melbourne Grammar School from 1901 to 1910. He was in the school's rowing First VIII and football First XVIII, On 29 October 1909, competing for Melbourne Grammar in the annual athletic sports meeting of the Public Schools' Association, he won the open mile race by more than ten yards, slowing down; he broke the previous record for the event by almost ten seconds. He held the record until 1916.

He entered King's College, Cambridge on 1 October 1910, graduating (BA) in 1914, and (MA) in 1917. He won a half-blue for boxing, in the middleweight division, in 1911; and in 1912, he was elected president of the university's Boxing and Fencing Club. He was also a member of Isaac Newton University Lodge.

== Football ==
While still a Melbourne Grammar student, he played one senior match for University in the Victorian Football League (VFL) competition, against Fitzroy, on 4 September 1909, the last game of the 1909 home-and-away season, in which Fitzroy, 9.6 (80), drew with University, 8.12 (60).

Larking played at full-forward, replacing the injured Albert Hartkopf; and, as often was the case in those days at the Brunswick Street Oval following inclement weather, the entire ground was in an atrocious "oozy condition", with "the going … heavier and somewhat more tricky than usual", and with "a veritable quagmire about 25 yards square, through which players plugged ankle deep" at the railway goal end of the ground.

== Military service ==
On the outbreak of World War I, and residing in England, he enlisted in the British Army. Initially a corporal and a Despatch rider, he was soon promoted to captain. He was twice awarded a Military Cross (M.C.) for bravery; thus, M.C. and bar. He was killed in a motorcycling accident in 1918. His obituary, in The Times of 12 April 1918, read (in part):

He enlisted, on the outbreak of the war, in the Despatch Riders' Corps [of the Royal Engineers Signal Service] as a corporal, and was in the retreat from Mons. He was given his commission in the field in September 1914, and, with the exception of ten months in England, training dispatch riders, was continuously on active service. At Pozières in 1916, while attached to the Australians as a signal officer, he was awarded the Military Cross, and at Messines in 1917 he gained his bar. His colonel wrote:— "He had only been with us three days, yet in that short time it was easy to see what a splendid fellow he was, and also what a capacity he had for getting things done in the right way. Apart from that, he came to us with a great reputation for courage and capacity."

== Legacy ==
A scholarship, the Ronald Guy Larking Exhibition was established in his name in 1919. It was awarded annually, and limited to the sons of soldiers, aged between 14½ and 17 years, who intended to study at Melbourne Grammar as a boarding student. It was tenable for their entire time at the school.

== See also ==
- List of Victorian Football League players who died on active service
