= Donham =

Donham is a surname. Notable people with the surname include:

- Bill Donham (1918–1998), member of the Ohio House of Representatives
- Bob Donham (1926–1983), American basketball player
- Wallace Brett Donham (1877–1954), American organizational theorist, professor, and Harvard Business School dean
- William R. Donham (1875–1945), justice of the Arkansas Supreme Court

== See also ==
- Downham (disambiguation)
