= Michell Cup =

The Michell Cup is a cup awarded annually at Cambridge University to the College boat club who has got the most points over the academic year. It was instituted in 1923 in the memory of Robert Williams Michell

- 1923 King's
- ...
- 1927 Selwyn/Peterhouse (tied)
- 1928 Peterhouse
- 1929 Peterhouse
- 1930 Jesus
- 1931 Magdalene
- 1932 St Catharine's
- ...
- 1934 Jesus
- ...
- 1937 Corpus Christi
- ...
- 1939 King's
- ...
- 1946 Trinity Hall
- ...
- 1956 Peterhouse
- ...
- 1973 Sidney Sussex
- ...
- 2005 Pembroke
- 2006 1st & 3rd Trinity
- 2007 Jesus
- 2008 1st & 3rd Trinity
- 2009 Magdalene
- 2010 Newnham
- 2011 Newnham
- 2012 St Catharine's
- 2013 Hughes Hall
- 2014 St Catharine's
- 2015 1st & 3rd Trinity
- 2016 Hughes Hall/Lucy Cavendish
- 2017 Caius
- 2018 Wolfson
- 2019 Caius
- 2020
- 2021
- 2022
- 2023 Lady Margaret
- 2024 Jesus
- 2025 1st & 3rd Trinity
