= Valentine Cary =

English clergyman

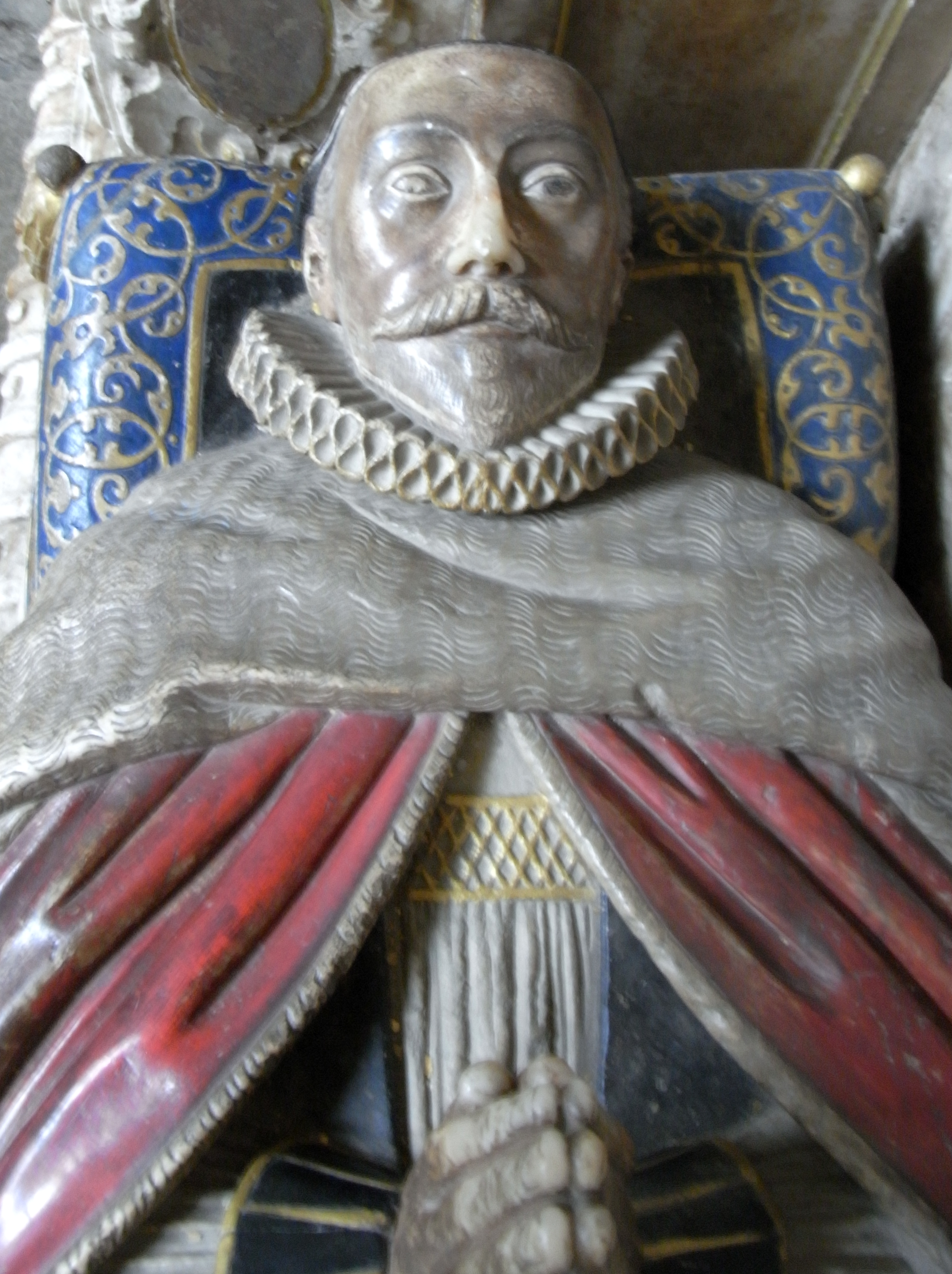
Effigy of Bishop Valentine Cary, detail from his monument in Exeter Cathedral

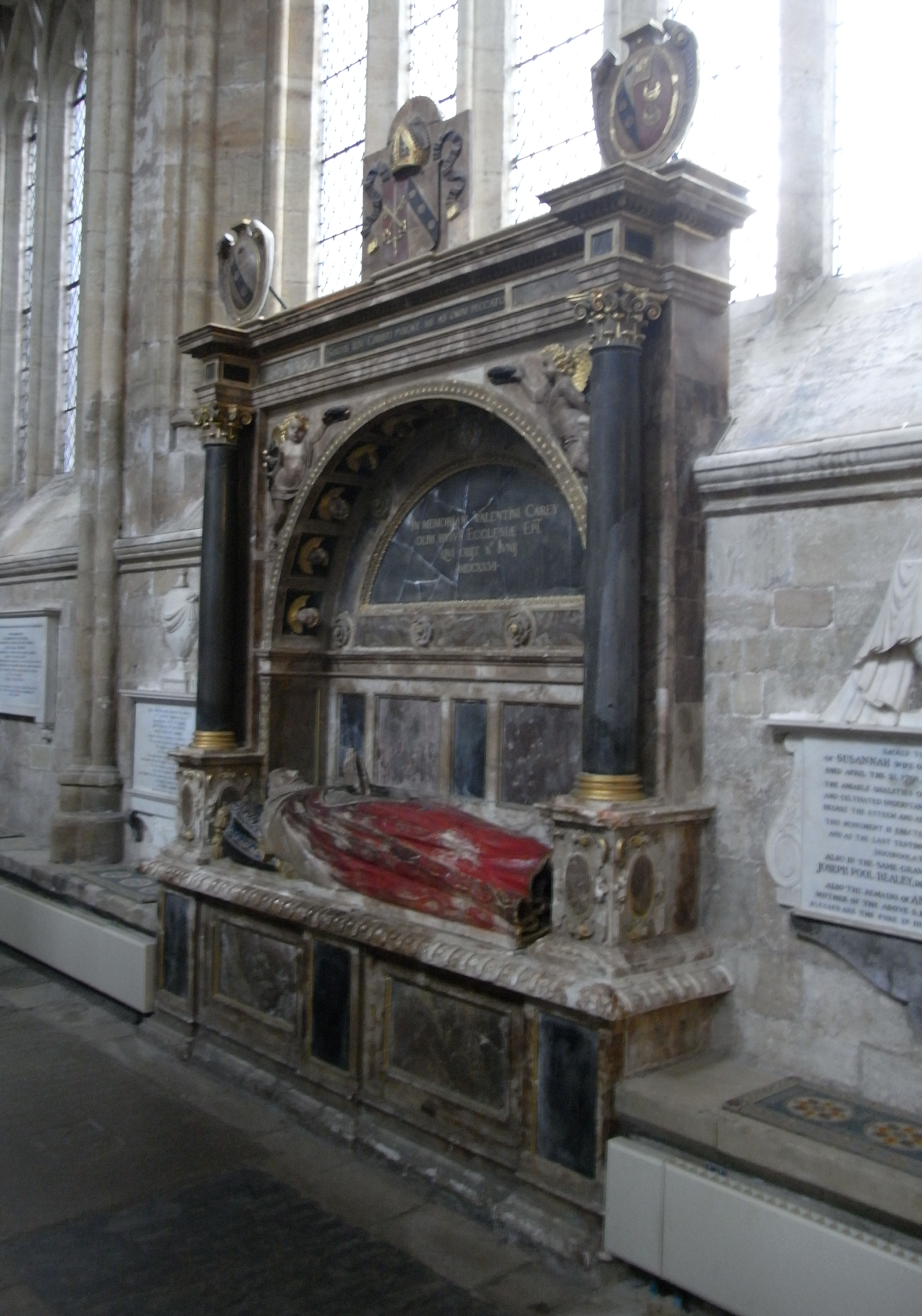
Monument to Bishop Valentine Cary, Exeter Cathedral

Valentine Cary (died 1626) (alias Carey, erroneously Carew), was an English clergyman, who became Bishop of Exeter.

== Origins ==
His origins are uncertain. He was born in about 1570 and is believed to have been an illegitimate son of Henry Carey, 1st Baron Hunsdon (1526–1596), due to the known fact that he was born at Berwick-upon-Tweed and at about the time when Lord Hunsdon was stationed there in connection with his military duties. This supposition therefore makes him an illegitimate brother of George Carey, 2nd Baron Hunsdon and of John Carey, 3rd Baron Hunsdon, whose son Henry Carey, 1st Earl of Dover, (and 1st Viscount Rochefort, 4th Baron Hunsdon) was the Bishop's patron by whose direct influence he was created Bishop of Exeter. In his will he names the 4th Baron's daughter Judith Carey as his god-daughter, and bequeathed to Sir John Carey, the 4th Baron's son and heir apparent, the sum of £10 for a mourning ring. He is known to have used the arms of the Carey family of Cockington and Clovelly in Devon (Argent, on a bend sable three roses of the field), of which the Barons Hunsdon were a junior branch, but added a bordure compony.

== Career ==
He was a graduate of Christ's College, Cambridge, and in 1591 was a Fellow of St John's College, Cambridge.

A pluralist, Cary was vicar of East Tilbury in 1603, rector at Great Parndon 1606 to 1616, and was vicar of Epping Upland from 1607 to 1609. He was also rector of Orsett and Toft from 1610.

In 1609/10, through the influence of his supposed half-brother John Carey, 3rd Baron Hunsdon (d.1617), he became Master of Christ's College, where he had been a Fellow from 1597 to 1600. The election was bitterly contested, by the Puritan element. Cary was backed by the Lord Chancellor, Baron Ellesmere. It led immediately to a confrontation between Cary and William Ames, who refused to wear the surplice, and who left Cambridge almost immediately. It also led Cary to be suspicious of Joseph Mede, who was to be one of Christ's best-known Fellows.

He was later Dean of St. Paul's. In 1621 he was appointed Bishop of Exeter.

== Theology ==
Cary is described as an Arminian.

== Death and burial ==
He died at his London townhouse in Drury Lane and was buried in Old St Paul's Cathedral, as he requested in his will should he die in London. Any monument he may have had in St Paul's did not survive the Great Fire of London of 1666. His elaborate monument with effigy does however survive in Exeter Cathedral.

== Arms ==
Coat of arms of Valentine Cary
Escutcheon Argent, on a bend sable three roses of the field, a mullet for difference.

== Notes and references ==
=== Sources ===
- Houston, S. J. (2014). James I. New York: Routledge.
- Tracy, James D.; Ragnow, Marguerite (2004). Religion and the Early Modern State: Views from China, Russia, and the West. Cambridge: Cambridge University Press.

Academic offices
Preceded by Edmund Barwell	Master of Christ's College, Cambridge; 1609–1622	Succeeded by Thomas Bainbrigg
Church of England titles
Preceded by John Overall	Dean of St Paul's; 1614–1621	Succeeded by John Donne
Preceded by William Cotton	Bishop of Exeter; 1621–1626	Succeeded by Joseph Hall
