= Bishop of Chester =

Diocesan bishop in the Church of England

- Bishopric

anglican
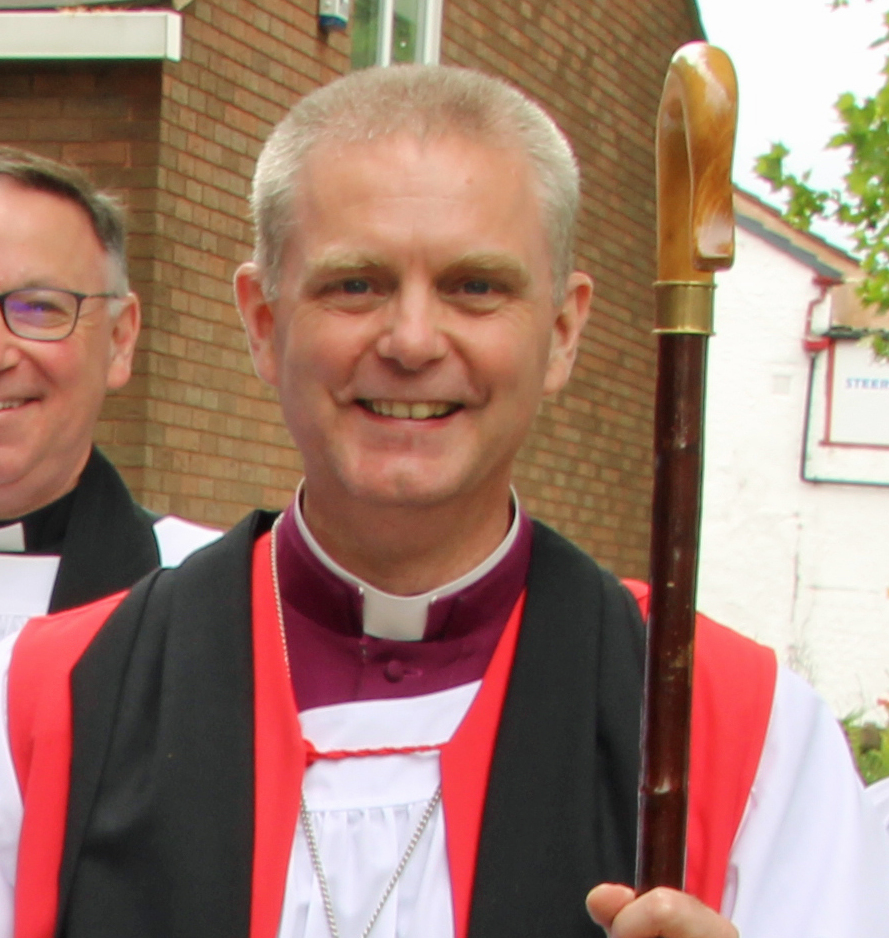
- Incumbent; Mark Tanner

Location
- Ecclesiastical province: York
- Residence: Bishop's House, Chester

Information
- First holder: John Bird
- Established: 1541
- Diocese: Chester
- Cathedral: Chester Cathedral

The Bishop of Chester is the Ordinary of the Church of England Diocese of Chester in the Province of York.

The diocese extends across most of the historic county boundaries of Cheshire, including the Wirral Peninsula and has its see in the City of Chester where the seat is located at the Cathedral Church of Christ and the Blessed Virgin Mary, which was formerly the Benedictine Abbey of Saint Werburgh, being elevated to cathedral status in 1541. The Bishop's residence is Bishop's House, Chester.

Cheshire previously held a bishopric from 1075 when the seat was at the collegiate church of St John the Baptist until 1102. The present diocese was formed in 1541 under King Henry VIII. Mark Tanner's election as Bishop of Chester was confirmed on 15 July 2020.

== Earliest times ==
Arms of the Bishop of Chester: Gules three mitres with their lables Or.

Chester at various periods in its history had a bishop and a cathedral, though till the early sixteenth century only intermittently. Even before the Norman conquest the title Bishop of Chester is found in documents applied to prelates who would be more correctly described as Bishop of Mercia or even Bishop of Lichfield. After the Council of London in 1075 had decreed the transfer of all episcopal sees to cities, Peter, Bishop of Lichfield, removed his seat from Lichfield to Chester, and became known as Bishop of Chester. There he chose as his cathedral collegiate church of Saint John the Baptist, an arrangement which continued until 1102.

The next bishop, however, transferred the see to Coventry on account of the rich monastery there, though he retained the episcopal palace at Chester. The Diocese of Coventry and Lichfield was of enormous extent, and it was probably found convenient to have something analogous to a cathedral at Chester, even though the cathedral itself was elsewhere; accordingly the church of St John ranked as a cathedral for a considerable time, and had its own dean and chapter of secular canons down to the time of the Reformation. But the chief ecclesiastical foundation in Chester was the Benedictine monastery of St Werburgh, the great church of which finally became the Cathedral Church of Christ and the Blessed Virgin Mary. The site had been occupied even during the Christian period of the Roman occupation by a church dedicated to Ss. Peter and Paul, and rededicated to St Werburgh and St Oswald during the Saxon period. The church was served by a small chapter of secular canons until 1093, when Hugh, Earl of Chester, converted it into a great Benedictine monastery, with the co-operation of St Anselm, then Prior of Bec, who sent Richard, one of his monks, to be the first abbot. A new Norman church was built by him and his successors.

This monastery, though suffering loss of property both by the depredations of the Welsh and the inroads of the sea, prospered, and in the thirteenth, fourteenth, and fifteenth centuries the monks transformed their Norman church into a gothic building.

== Tudor period ==
The last of the abbots of Chester was John, or Thomas, Clark, who resigned his abbey, valued at £1,003 5s. 11d. per annum, to the king at the time of the dissolution of the monasteries.

In 1541 Henry VIII, without papal sanction, created six new episcopal sees, one of which was Chester. The archdeaconry of Chester, from the Diocese of Coventry and Lichfield, and that of Richmond, from York, were combined to form the new see, and it was laid down that the abbey church, now the cathedral, was to be served by a dean and six prebends, the former abbot becoming the first dean. At first the diocese was annexed to the Province of Canterbury, but by another Act of Parliament it was soon transferred to that of York. The first bishop was the Provincial of the Carmelites, John Bird, a doctor of divinity who had attracted the king's attention by his sermons preached against the pope's supremacy. Having already been rewarded by appointment as Bishop of Bangor, he was now translated to Chester. On the accession of Mary he was deprived as being a married man, and died as Vicar of Dunmow in 1556.

Despite the origins of the diocese, it was recognised by the Roman See for the space of Queen Mary's reign. George Cotes, Master of Balliol and Fellow of Magdalen College, Oxford, and lecturer in theology, was appointed bishop by the Roman See. In 1556 he was succeeded by Cuthbert Scott, an able theologian and Vice-Chancellor of Cambridge University. On the accession of Elizabeth I he was one of the four Roman Catholic bishops chosen to defend Roman Catholic doctrine at the conference at Westminster, and immediately after this he was sent to the Tower and was deprived in 1559. Being released on bail, he contrived to escape to the Continent. He died at Louvain, on 9 October 1564.

== Subsequent centuries ==
The present diocese covers most of the traditional county of Cheshire, including the Wirral Peninsula and has its see in the City of Chester where the seat is located at the Cathedral Church of Christ and the Blessed Virgin Mary, which was formerly the Benedictine Abbey of Saint Werburgh, being elevated to cathedral status in 1541.

== List of bishops ==
List of bishops of Chester after the foundation of the modern diocese of Chester in 1541.

Earlier the midland diocese had for a time had its see at Chester, for which see List of the Bishops of the Diocese of Lichfield and its precursor offices.

Bishops of Chester
From	Until	Incumbent	Notes
1541	1554	John Bird	Translated from Bangor; deprived by Mary I.
1554	1555	George Cotes	Died in office.
1556	1559	Cuthbert Scott	Deprived by Elizabeth I.
1561	1577	William Downham	Died in office.
1579	1595	William Chaderton	Translated to Lincoln.
1595	1596	Hugh Bellot	Translated from Bangor; died in office.
1597	1604	Richard Vaughan	Translated from Bangor; translated to London.
1604	1615	George Lloyd	Translated from Sodor and Man; died in office.
1616	1619	Thomas Morton	Translated to Lichfield and Coventry then Durham.
1619	1646	John Bridgeman	Deprived of the see when the English episcopy was abolished by Parliament on 9 October 1646. Died in 1652.
1646	1660	The see was abolished during the Commonwealth and the Protectorate.	
1660	1661	Brian Walton	Died in office.
1662		Henry Ferne	Died shortly after consecration.
1662	1668	George Hall	Also Archdeacon of Canterbury; died in office.
1668	1672	John Wilkins	Died in office.
1673	1686	John Pearson	Died in office.
1686	1689	Thomas Cartwright	Followed James II into exile after the Glorious Revolution and died of dysentery shortly after arriving in Dublin.
1689	1707	Nicholas Stratford	Died in office.
1708	1714	Sir William Dawes, Bt.	Translated to York.
1714	1725	Francis Gastrell	Died in office.
1726	1752	Samuel Peploe	Died in office.
1752	1771	Edmund Keene	Translated to Ely.
1771	1776	William Markham	Translated to York.
1776	1787	Beilby Porteus	Translated to London.
1788	1800	William Cleaver	Translated to Bangor then St Asaph.
1800	1809	Henry Majendie	Translated to Bangor.
1810	1812	Bowyer Sparke	Translated to Ely.
1812	1824	George Henry Law	Translated to Bath and Wells.
1824	1828	Charles James Blomfield	Translated to London.
1828	1848	John Bird Sumner	Translated to Canterbury.
1848	1865	John Graham	Died in office.
1865	1884	William Jacobson	Retired.
1884	1889	William Stubbs	Translated to Oxford.
1889	1919	Francis Jayne	Retired.
1919	1932	Luke Paget	Translated from Stepney.
1932	1939	Geoffrey Fisher	Translated to London then Canterbury.
1939	1955	Douglas Crick	Translated from Stafford.
1955	1973	Gerald Ellison	Translated from Willesden; translated to London.
1974	1981	Victor Whitsey	Translated from Hertford.
1982	1996	Michael Baughen	Retired to London and Southwark; now honorary assistant bishop in Guildford.
1996	2019	Peter Forster	Retired 30 September 2019.
2019	2020	Keith Sinclair, Bishop of Birkenhead	Acting diocesan bishop
2020	present	Mark Tanner	Translated from Berwick 15 July 2020

== Assistant bishops ==
Among those who have served as assistant bishops in the diocese have been:

- 1934 – 1948: Norman Tubbs, Archdeacon of Chester and Canon Residentiary until 1937, Dean of Chester thereafter; former Bishop in Tinnevelly and Bishop of Rangoon
- 1962 – 1965 (res.): Tom Greenwood, Vicar of Whitegate and former Bishop of Yukon

== See also ==
- Armorial of bishops of Chester
