= Alfred Rankley =

English painter

Alfred Rankley (1819–7 December 1872) was a British painter.

== Life ==
Rankley received his art training in the Royal Academy Schools, and began to exhibit there in 1841, when he sent a scene from Shakespeare's Macbeth. This was followed in 1842 by Palamon and Lavinia, exhibited at the Society of British Artists. In 1843 he sent to the Royal Academy a portrait, in 1844 a scene from Othello, and in 1845 a subject from Crabbe's poems. Another portrait and Paul and Virginia were his contributions to the exhibition of 1846, in which year he sent to the Society of British Artists Edith and the Monks finding the Body of Harold, and The Fortune-Teller.

Rankley died at his residence, Clifton Villa, Campden Hill, Kensington, on 7 December 1872, aged 52, and was buried in the St. Marylebone Cemetery in East Finchley.

== Works ==
From 1847 until 1867 Rankley was a regular exhibitor at the Royal Academy, always sending a picture, but never more than two.

His exhibited works included The Ruined Spendthrift (1848), Love in Humble Life and Innocence and Guilt (1849), The Sunday School (1850), The Pharisee and Publican (1851), Dr. Watts visiting some of his Little Friends (1853), The Village School (1856), The Welcome Guest and The Lonely Hearth (1857), The Return of the Prodigal (1858), The Farewell Sermon (1859) (engraved by William Henry Simmons), The Day is done (1860), The Gipsy at the Gate (1862), A Sower went forth to sow (1863), The Doctor's coming (1864), (considered to be his best work, representing a scene in a gipsy encampment, After Work (1865), Tis Home where the Heart is (1866), Follow my Leader (1867), Following the Trail and The Hearth of his Home (1870), and The Benediction (1871). The Parish Beauty and The Pastor's Pet were engraved by Robert Mitchell; Reading the Litany, Sunday Afternoon, and The Sunday School, by James Scott; Refreshment, Sir? by W. H. Egleton; and The Scoffers, by Henry Thomas Ryall.

== Notes ==
Attribution

This article incorporates text from a publication now in the public domain: Lee, Sidney, ed. (1896). "Rankley, Alfred". Dictionary of National Biography. Vol. 47. London: Smith, Elder & Co.
