= Henry Thirkill =

20th century English academic

Sir Henry Thirkill CBE MC (8 August 1886 – 26 March 1971) was an English physicist and academic administrator.

Thirkill was born in Bradford and spent his whole career at Clare College, Cambridge. After completing his degree at Clare he was appointed Fellow in 1910; and Demonstrator in Experimental Physics in 1912. He was an officer with the Royal Engineers during World War I, and won the Military Cross during the East African Campaign. On his return he was appointed Lecturer in Experimental Physics in 1918. He was Tutor at Clare from 1920 to 1939; President from 1920 to 1939; and its Master from 1939 to 1958; and Fellow again from 1959 until his death. He was a Member of Council of Senate from 1927 to 1956; Vice-Chancellor from 1945 to 1947; and Deputy Vice-Chancellor from 1947 to 1955. He was a member of Isaac Newton University Lodge and also President of Cambridge University Cricket Club between 1947 and 1965.

Thirkill died in Cambridge. A memorial service was held at St Edward's Church, Cambridge, on 22 May 1971.
