= Thomas Bainbrigg =

English college head

Thomas Bainbrigg (Bainbridge) (died 1646) was an English college head.

== Life ==
A northerner, he was possibly from Kirkby Lonsdale. He graduated B.A. at Christ's College, Cambridge in 1597, M.A. in 1600. He became Master of Christ's in 1622, and was Vice-Chancellor of the University of Cambridge in 1627.

He was Master in John Milton's student days at Christ's. Bainbrigg was not a strong partisan on religious issues, but supported George Villiers, 1st Duke of Buckingham in his contest with Thomas Howard, 1st Earl of Berkshire in 1627 for the position of Chancellor. He spoke up for Isaac Dorislaus, accused as a republican. A funeral sermon by Bainbrigg, on 16 October 1620, had an awakening effect on Thomas Goodwin, who was to become an important Puritan figure.

Bainbrigg was a benefactor to his college, which prospered under his leadership. Student numbers climbed, and the Civil War times had little adverse effect, with Bainbrigg, known not to be against the Puritans, left in place.

== Notes ==
Academic offices
Preceded by Valentine Carey	Master of Christ's College, Cambridge; 1622–1646	Succeeded by Samuel Bolton
