= Thomas Thompson (Master of Christ's College, Cambridge) =

Thomas Thompson, D.D. was a priest and academic in the late fifteenth and early sixteenth centuries.

Thompson was educated at Christ's College, Cambridge, graduating B.A. in 1489; MA in 1482; and B.D. in 1502. He held livings at Enfield and Gateley. He was Master of Christ's from 1508 to 1517 and Vice-Chancellor of the University of Cambridge from 1510 to 1512.

He died in March 1540.
