= William Taylor (Master of Christ's College, Cambridge) =

William Taylor, D.D. was an academic in the sixteenth century.

Taylor was educated at Chelmsford School and Christ's College, Cambridge, graduating B.A. in 1545; MA in 1548; and B.D. in 1554. He was Fellow of Christ's from 1547 to 1556; and then Master from 1556 until his deprivation in 1559.
