= Herb Mitchell =

Herb(ert) Mitchell may refer to:

- Herb Mitchell (actor) (1937–2011), American actor, director and teacher
- Herb Mitchell (ice hockey) (1895–1969), ice hockey player
- Herbert Mitchell (athlete), Footer US NC 800m Men

== See also ==
- Bert Mitchell (disambiguation)
