= Bobby Mitchell (disambiguation) =

Bobby Mitchell (1935–2020) was an American professional football player who was inducted into the Pro Football Hall of Fame.

Bobby Mitchell may also refer to:

== Sports ==
=== Baseball ===
- Bobby Mitchell (1970s outfielder) (1943–2019), American outfielder and designated hitter
- Bobby Mitchell (1980s outfielder) (born 1955), American outfielder
- Bobby Mitchell (pitcher) (1856–1933), American pitcher

=== Other sports ===
- Bobby Mitchell (footballer, born 1924) (1924–1993), Scottish footballer and manager
- Bobby Mitchell (footballer, born 1955), English footballer
- Bobby Mitchell (golfer) (1943–2018), American golfer

== Other people ==
- Bobby Mitchell (singer) (1935–1986), American R&B singer
- Bobby Mitchell (died 1968), disc jockey who co-produced with Tom Donahue the last Beatles concert

== See also ==
- Bob Mitchell (disambiguation)
- Robert Mitchell (disambiguation)
