= Albert Mitchell (disambiguation) =

Albert Mitchell was a soccer player.

Albert Mitchell may also refer to:

- The Answer Man, 1940s radio presenter Albert Mitchell
- Bert Mitchell, English footballer
- Roy Mitchell (baseball), Albert Roy Mitchell, baseball player
- Al Mitchell, Albert Edwin Mitchell

== See also ==
- Bert Mitchell (disambiguation)
