= Bert Mitchell (disambiguation) =

Bert Mitchell (1922–1997) was an English footballer.

Bert Mitchell may also refer to:

- Bert Mitchell, founder of accounting firm Mitchell & Titus
- Bert Mitchell, former Mayor of Blenheim

== See also ==
- Albert Mitchell (disambiguation)
- Robert Mitchell (disambiguation)
- Herbert Mitchell (disambiguation)
