= Francis Gastrell =

British bishop and writer

The Right Reverend Francis Gastrell
- Bishop of Chester
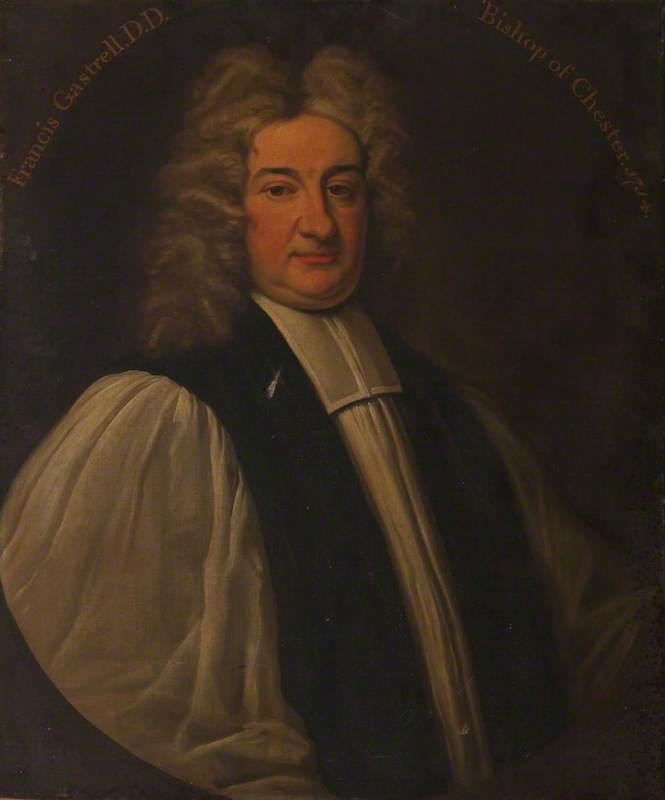
- Diocese: Diocese of Chester
- In office: 1714–1725 (death)
- Predecessor: Sir William Dawes, Bt.
- Successor: Samuel Peploe

Personal details
- Born: 10 May 1662 Slapton, Northamptonshire
- Died: 24 November 1725 (aged 63) Christ Church, Oxford
- Buried: Christ Church, Oxford
- Denomination: Anglican
- Spouse: Elizabeth Mapletoft (m.1703)
- Education: Westminster School; Christ Church, Oxford

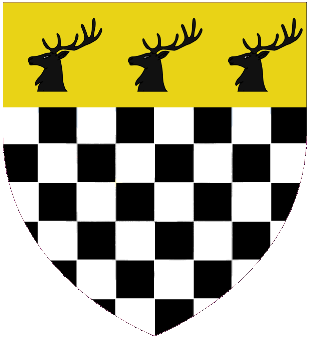
Arms:Checky Argent and Sable on a chief Or three bucks' heads couped of the second.

Francis Gastrell (10 May 1662 – 24 November 1725) was Bishop of Chester and a writer on deism. He was a friend of Jonathan Swift, mentioned several times in A Journal to Stella, and chaplain to Robert Harley, 1st Earl of Oxford and Earl Mortimer, when Harley was Speaker of the House of Commons.

== Life ==
He was born on 10 May 1662 at Slapton, Northamptonshire and educated at Westminster School and Christ Church, Oxford. He was Boyle Lecturer in 1697.

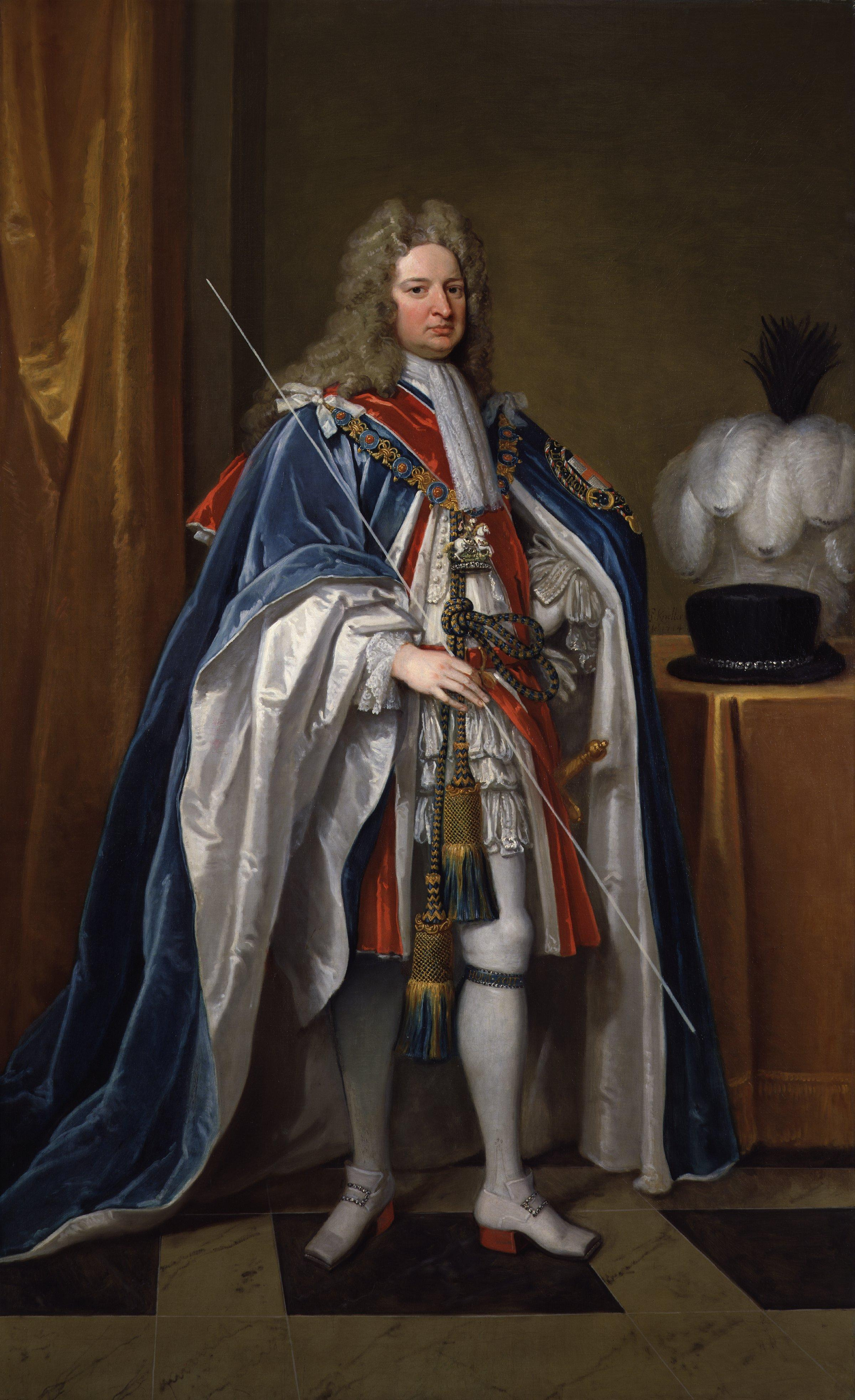
Robert Harley, 1st Earl of Oxford and Earl Mortimer.

One of a group of Tory High Churchmen, he was on good terms with Francis Atterbury, George Smalridge and Robert Nelson, and one of the Commission of the end of the reign of Queen Anne. In 1714, the year of her death, he became bishop of Chester through Harley's influence (consecrated on 14 April of that year in Somerset House Chapel). When Atterbury was put on trial in 1723, Gastrell spoke in his defence.

He was a noted controversialist, but considered to hold moderate views. He criticised Anthony Collins, but was quite approving of John Locke. He criticised the Trinitarian theories of William Sherlock as innovative.

As a diocesan bishop, he is noted for the fine-grained survey he made of every parish, published in the nineteenth century as Notitia Cestriensis. Along with it was published the so-called Gastrell Manuscript, or Chronicle of St. Werburg, edited by F. R. Raines.

He died from gout on 24 November 1725.

== Works ==
- The Certainty and Necessity of Religion in general; or the first Grounds and Principles of Human Duty Established (1697) Boyle Lecture
- Some Considerations Concerning the Trinity (1698)
- Principles of Deism truly represented (1709) attributed, dialogues
- Christian Institutes (1707)
- The Bishop of Chester's case, with relation to the wardenship of Manchester (1721)
- A Moral Proof of the Certainty of a Future State (1725)
- Notitia Cestriensis published around 1850, Chetham Society

== Notes ==
Church of England titles
Preceded by Sir William Dawes, Bt.	Bishop of Chester; 1714–1725	Succeeded by Samuel Peploe
