= William Chaderton =

English bishop

The Right Reverend William Chaderton
- Bishop of Lincoln
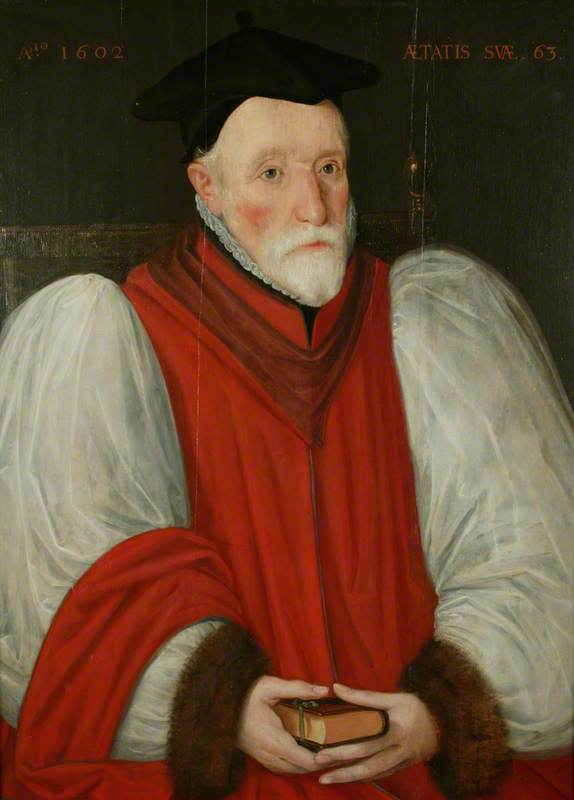
- Diocese: Diocese of Lincoln
- In office: 1595–1608 (death)
- Predecessor: William Wickham
- Successor: William Barlow
- Other post: Bishop of Chester (1579–1595)

Personal details
- Born: c. 1540 Moston, Manchester
- Died: 11 April 1608 Southoe, Cambridgeshire
- Denomination: Anglican
- Spouse: Katherine Revell
- Education: Pembroke College, Cambridge; Christ's College, Cambridge

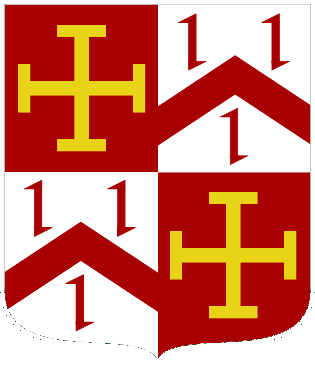
Arms: Quarterly 1st and 4th Gules a cross potent Or 2nd and 3rd Argent a chevron between three crampirons Gules.

William Chaderton (c.1540 – 11 April 1608) was an English academic and bishop. He also served as Lady Margaret's Professor of Divinity.

He was born in Moston, Lancashire, what is now a part of the city of Manchester. After attending The King's School, Chester and/or Manchester Grammar School, he went on to Cambridge, first entering Magdalene College, then moving to Pembroke College, where he matriculated in 1555. He graduated B.A. in 1557/8 (at Christ's College), M.A. 1561, B.D. 1566, D.D. 1569 (at Queens' College).

He was a Fellow of Christ's College 1558–1568, Lady Margaret's Professor of Divinity 1567–1569, Regius Professor of Divinity 1569–1580, and President of Queens' College, Cambridge from 1568 to 1579. He was Rector of Holywell, Huntingdonshire in 1570. He was Bishop of Chester from 1579 to 1595. He was then Bishop of Lincoln from 1595 to 1608.

He was also Warden of Manchester College, where he was succeeded by John Dee.

== Family ==
Elizabeth Jocelin (née Brooke), author of The Mothers Legacie, To her Unborne Childe (1624), was his granddaughter. After his granddaughter's parents separated, and her mother returned home, Bishop Chaderton was mainly responsible for her upbringing. Elizabeth's childhood was therefore passed in the house of Bishop Chaderton, who educated her. She was extremely well versed in art, religion and language.

== Notes ==
Academic offices
Preceded by John Whitgift	Regius Professor of Divinity at Cambridge; 1569–1579	Succeeded by William Whitaker
Preceded by John Stokes	President of Queens' College, Cambridge; 1568–1579	Succeeded by Humphrey Tyndall
Church of England titles
Preceded by William Downham	Bishop of Chester; 1579–1595	Succeeded by Hugh Bellot
Preceded by William Wickham	Bishop of Lincoln; 1595–1608	Succeeded by William Barlow
