= Robert Mitchell (engraver) =

English engraver (1820–1873)

Robert Mitchell (19 May 1820 – 16 May 1873) was an English engraver, son of the engraver James Mitchell. He died at Bromley, Kent.

== Works ==
Mitchell engraved in mezzotint Tapageur, a fashionable Member of the Canine Society, after Sir Edwin Landseer (1852) and The Parish Beauty (1853) and The Pastor's Pet, a pair after Alfred Rankley (1854). In the mixed style he engraved The Happy Mothers and The Startled Twins, a pair after Richard Ansdell, R.A. (1850), and Christ walking on the Sea, after Robert Scott Lauder (1854). Several of his etched plates were completed in mezzotint by other engravers.

== Notes ==
Attribution

This article incorporates text from a publication now in the public domain: Lee, Sidney, ed. (1894). "Mitchell, James (1791-1852)". Dictionary of National Biography. Vol. 38. London: Smith, Elder & Co.
