= William Jacobson =

English Anglican theologian and bishop (1803–1884)

The Right Reverend William Jacobson
- Bishop of Chester
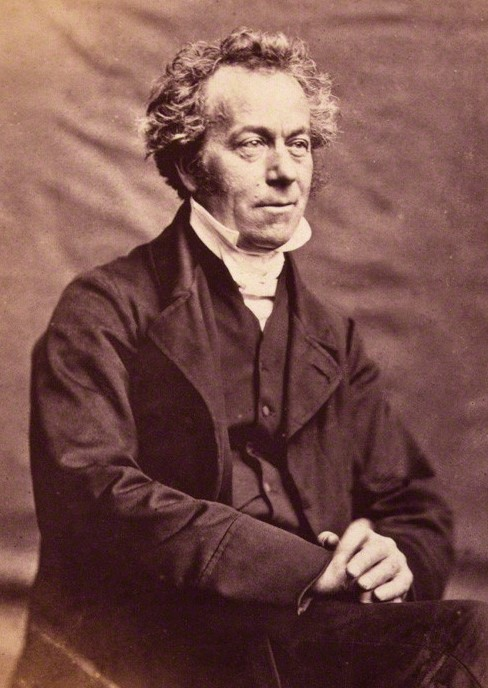
- William Jacobson, photograph by Lewis Carroll, 1857.
- Church: Church of England
- Diocese: Diocese of Chester
- In office: 1865–1884
- Predecessor: John Graham
- Successor: William Stubbs

Personal details
- Born: 18 July 1803 Great Yarmouth
- Died: 13 July 1884 (aged 80) Deeside
- Denomination: Anglican
- Education: Homerton College, London; University of Glasgow; St Edmund Hall, Oxford; Lincoln College, Oxford

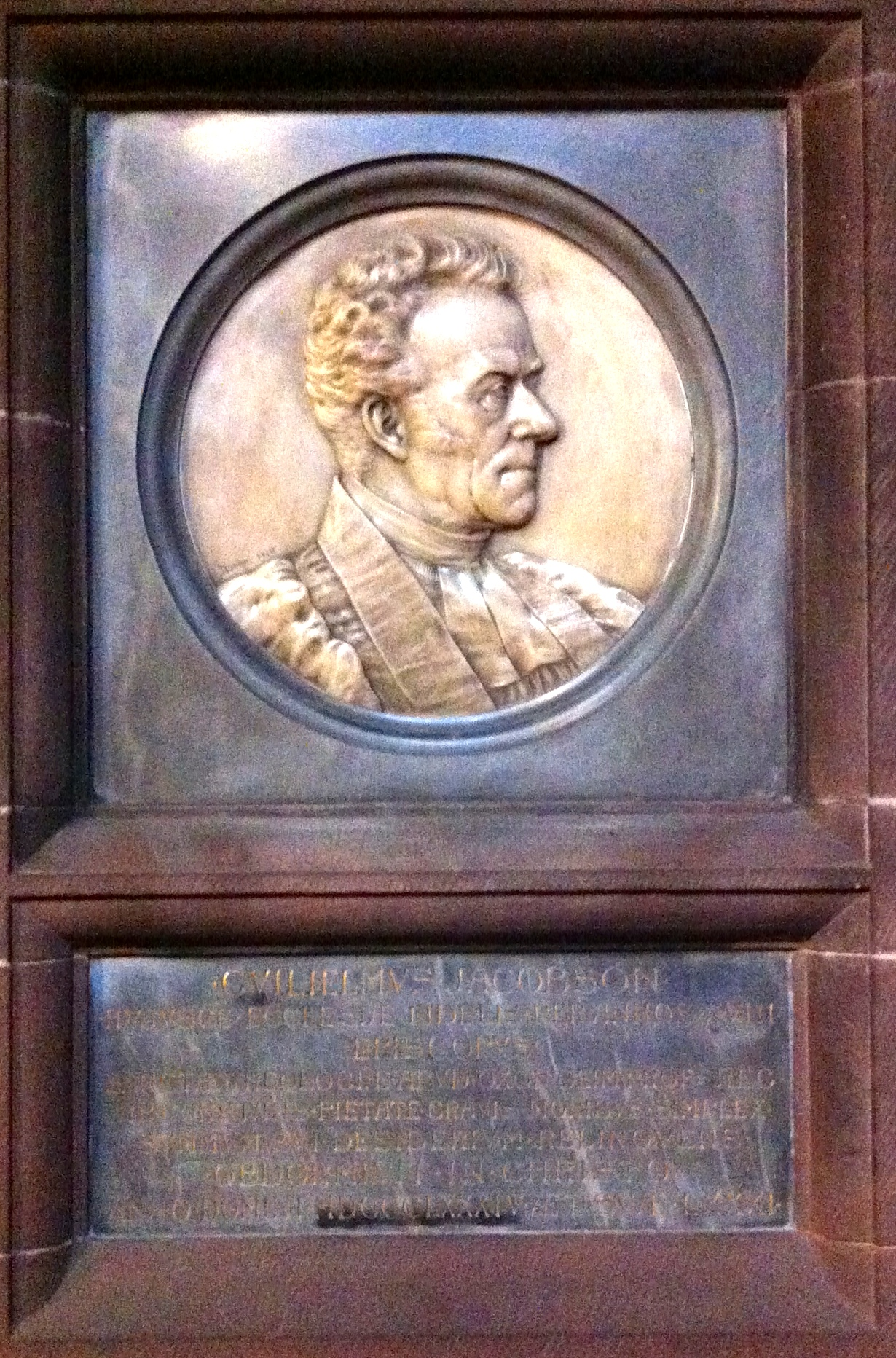
Memorial to William Jacobson in Chester Cathedral

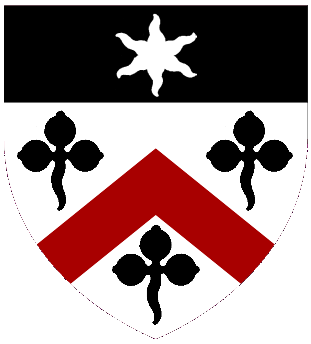
Jacobson's shield of arms: Argent a chevron Gules between three trefoils slipped Sable on a chief also Sable an estoile Silver.

William Jacobson (18 July 1803 – 13 July 1884) was Regius Professor of Divinity at Oxford University (1848–1865) and Bishop of Chester (1865–1884).

== Life ==
The son of William Jacobson, a merchant's clerk, of Great Yarmouth, Norfolk, by his wife Judith, born Clarke, was born on 18 July 1803. His father died shortly after his birth, and his mother's second husband was a nonconformist. He was sent when about nine to a school at Norwich kept by Mr. Brewer, a baptist, the father of John Sherren Brewer. He went on to Homerton College, London, and in 1822–3 was a student at Glasgow University. On 3 May 1823, he was admitted commoner of St Edmund Hall, Oxford, being, it is said, befriended by Dawson Turner of Yarmouth, a member of the Society of Friends. He had little money. In May 1825, he was elected scholar of Lincoln College (B.A. in 1827), taking a second class in literæ humaniores.

Failing to win a fellowship at Exeter College, Jacobson was a private tutor in Ireland until 1829. He then returned to Oxford, obtained the Ellerton theological prize, was elected fellow at Exeter on 30 June, and proceeded M.A. On 6 June 1830, he was ordained deacon, was appointed to the curacy of St Mary Magdalen, Oxford, and was ordained priest the following year. In 1832, he was appointed vice-principal of Magdalen Hall, where he did much to encourage industry and enforce discipline. With a view to preparing an edition of the Patres Apostolici, he went at this period to Florence, Rome, and elsewhere to consult manuscripts. In 1836 he was offered a mastership at Harrow School by Charles Longley, the head-master, afterwards archbishop of York; but Longley was that year made Bishop of Ripon, nothing came of it. He offered himself as Longley's successor at Harrow, but was not appointed.

In 1839, Jacobson became perpetual curate of Iffley, near Oxford, was made public orator of the university in 1842, and was chosen select preacher in 1833, 1842, and 1863, but did not serve on the last occasion. By the advice of Lord John Russell, then prime minister, Jacobson was in 1848 promoted to the regius professorship of divinity at Oxford, which carried with it a canonry of Christ Church, Oxford and at that time also the rectory of Ewelme, Oxfordshire. In politics, he was a liberal, and he was chairman of William Gladstone's election committee at Oxford in 1865. On 23 June 1865, he accepted the offer of the see of Chester, and was consecrated on 8 July.

In his charge at his primary visitation in October 1868 (published), Jacobson spoke on the duty of rubrical conformity. Although he had no liking for new ritual, he made it clearly understood that he would discountenance prosecutions for ritualism. His call to conformity gave offence to some low churchmen, and in the earlier years of his episcopate he was twice mobbed by Orangemen in Liverpool when on his way to consecrate churches intended for the performance of an ornate service. He promoted the division of his diocese made by the foundation of the bishopric of Liverpool in 1880.

Failure of health caused Jacobson to resign his bishopric in February 1884; he was then in his eighty-first year. He died at the episcopal residence, Deeside, on Sunday morning, 13 July 1884. His portrait, painted by Richmond, has been engraved.

== Works ==
Jacobson published:

- an edition of Alexander Nowell's Catechismus, with a Life, 1835, 1844;
- an edition of the extant writings of the Patres Apostolici, as S. Clementis Romani, S. Ignatii ... quæ supersunt, &c., 2 vols. 1838, 1840, 1847, 1863, a relevant to the genuineness of the longer recension of the Ignatian epistles (see William Cureton);
- an edition of the Works of Robert Sanderson, 6 vols., 1854,

and a few shorter books, sermons, and charges. He also wrote annotations on the Acts of the Apostles for the Speaker's Commentary.

== Family ==
Jacobson married, on 23 June 1836, Eleanor Jane, youngest daughter of Dawson Turner. By his wife, who survived him, he had ten children, of whom three sons and two daughters survived him. Their son was the surgeon W. H. A. Jacobson.

Academic offices
Preceded by Renn Dickson Hampden	Regius Professor of Divinity at Oxford; 1848–1865	Succeeded by Robert Payne Smith
Church of England titles
Preceded by John Graham	Bishop of Chester; 1865–1884	Succeeded by William Stubbs
