= Richard Wyot (priest, died 1522) =

Christian priest in the late fifteen and early sixteenth centuries

Richard Wyot was a priest and academic in the late fifteenth and early sixteenth centuries.

Wyot was educated at Christ's College, Cambridge, graduating B.A. in 1493; MA in 1496; and B.D. in 1507. He was Fellow of Christ's from 1496 to 1506; and Master from 1506 to 1508. He held livings at Wigan, Cambridge and Bingham

He died in July 1522.
