= Henry Lockwood (academic) =

Henry Lockwood, D.D. was a priest and academic in the sixteenth century.

Lockwood was educated at Queens' College, Cambridge, graduating B.A. in 1516; MA in 1518; and B.D. in 1526. He held livings at Navenby and Enfield. He was Fellow of Christ's from 1523 to 1531; and its Master from 1531 to 1548.

He died on 15 October 1555.
