= Richard Wilkes =

Priest and academic in the mid sixteenth century

Richard Wilkes was a priest and academic in the mid sixteenth century.

Watson was educated at Queens' College, Cambridge, graduating B.A. in 1524; MA in 1527; and B.D. in 1537. He held livings at Littlebury, Pulham and Fen Ditton. He was Fellow of Queen's from 1526 to 1542; and Master of Christ's from 1548 to 1553.

He died on 15 October 1556.
