= Richard Rooke Michell =

English mines proprietor (1810-1872)

Richard Rooke Michell (31 December 1810, in Marazion, Cornwall – 15 April 1872, in Wimpole Street, London) was an English mines proprietor. Along with Thomas Garland, George Smith, Sampson Waters, John Solomon Bickford and John Charles Lanyon he was the principal behind the formation of the English Arsenic Company. His main focus was in copper and tin mining. Operating as RR Michell & Co he bought and operated the Trereife tin smelting works near Newlyn, Cornwall.

In the census of June 1841 he was reported to have resided at Cliff Cottage in East Cliff Lane, Marazion. Later, in the 1860s, he built the larger nine-bedroom Chymorvah House for his children in his native town of Marazion, overlooking the sea and St Michael's Mount, accumulating much wealth from his mining adventures. He ventured into politics and had numerous disputes with Absalom Bennett who contested the position of Mayor of Marazion with Michell. He died on 15 April 1872.

Michell was married to Mary Eastwood (1813 – April 1850). The couple had four children. three girls: Elizabeth (1836–1914), Sarah (8 October 1839 – 25 March 1902), Mary (1840–?) and a son named Ambrose (1842–?) who followed in his father's footsteps in the mining profession.
