= Marcus Martin (cricketer) =

English cricketer (1842–1908)

Marcus Trevelyan Martin (29 April 1842 – 5 June 1908) was an English first-class cricketer active 1861–70 who played for Middlesex, Marylebone Cricket Club (MCC) and Cambridge University. He was born in Barrackpore; he died in Marylebone.
