= Edmund Barwell =

Edmund Barwell, D.D. (1766–1832) was a priest and academic in the late sixteenth and early seventeenth centuries.

Browne was educated at Christ's College, Cambridge, graduating B.A. in 1568; MA in 1571; and B.D. in 1578. He was Fellow of Christ's from 1570 to 1581; and then Master until his death in 1609. He was Rector of Toft, Cambridgeshire from 1584.
