= Samuel Bolton =

English clergyman and scholar

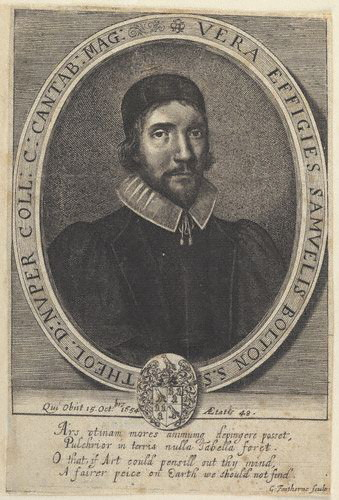
- Samuel Bolton
- Born: 1606; London
- Died: 15 October 1654 (aged 47–48)
- Occupation(s): English clergyman and scholar

Samuel Bolton (1606 – 15 October 1654) was an English clergyman and scholar, a member of the Westminster Assembly and Master of Christ's College, Cambridge.

== Life ==
Samuel Bolton was the son of William Bolton, of Lancashire. He was born in London in 1606, and educated at Christ's College, Cambridge. In 1643 he was chosen one of the Westminster assembly of divines. He was successively minister of St. Martin's, Ludgate Street, of St. Saviour's, Southwark, and of St. Andrew's, Holborn.

He was appointed, on the death of Thomas Bainbrigg in 1646, master of Christ's College, Cambridge, and served as Vice-Chancellor of Cambridge University in 1651. He has been identified with the Samuel Bolton who, in 1649, attended Henry Rich, 1st Earl of Holland on the scaffold. He died, after a long illness, on 15 October 1654. Edmund Calamy preached his funeral sermon.

Bolton's publication The Sinfulness of Sin was originally delivered as a sermon to the House of Commons of England on a solemn day of humiliation on 25 March 1646.

== Quotes ==
- The law sends us to the gospel that we may be justified; and the gospel sends us to the law again to inquire what is our duty as those who are justified....The law sends us to the gospel for our justification; the gospel sends us to the law to frame our way of life.

== Works ==
His books include:

- A Tossed Ship making for a Safe Harbour; or a Word in Season to a Sinking Kingdom (1644)
- The True Bounds of Christian Freedom (1645)
- A Vindication of the Rights of the Law and the Liberties of Grace (1646)
- The Arraignment of Error (1646)
- The Sinfulnesse of Sin (1646)
- The Guard of the Tree of Life (1647)
- The Wedding Garment
- Posthumously, The Dead Saint speaking to Saints and Sinners, (with a portrait prefixed).

== Family ==
He has been incorrectly identified both as a son and a brother of Robert Bolton (1572–1631); Robert Bolton's son Samuel was a clergyman who died in 1668.

== Notes ==
Academic offices
Preceded by Thomas Bainbrigg	Master of Christ's College, Cambridge; 1646–1654	Succeeded by Ralph Cudworth
