= Joseph Shaw (Christ's College) =

Rev. Joseph Shaw (16 December 1784, Barton-in-Westmorland – 1 June 1859, Cambridge) was Master of Christ's College, Cambridge. He tutored Charles Darwin at Cambridge in 1828.

Shaw was the son of the Rev. Edward Shaw, headmaster of Loughborough Grammar School, where he received his early education.

Shaw was admitted as a Sizar at Christ's College, Cambridge in 1803, gaining a BA 1807, and an MA in 1810. He was a Fellow of the college between 1807 and 1849, when he was elected Master in succession to John Graham. However, he resigned the office before his term of grace had expired, in the conscientious feeling that his age rendered him unsuited to responsibilities of the office. James Cartmell was elected in succession. He then became a Senior Fellow from then until his death.

Shaw also served as Praelector, Tutor and Senior Dean. He died at Christ's College in 1859 and was buried in the ante-chapel there.

Academic offices
Preceded by John Graham	Master of Christ's College, Cambridge; 1849	Succeeded by James Cartmell
