= Samuel Peploe (bishop) =

British bishop

The Right Reverend Samuel Peploe
- Bishop of Chester
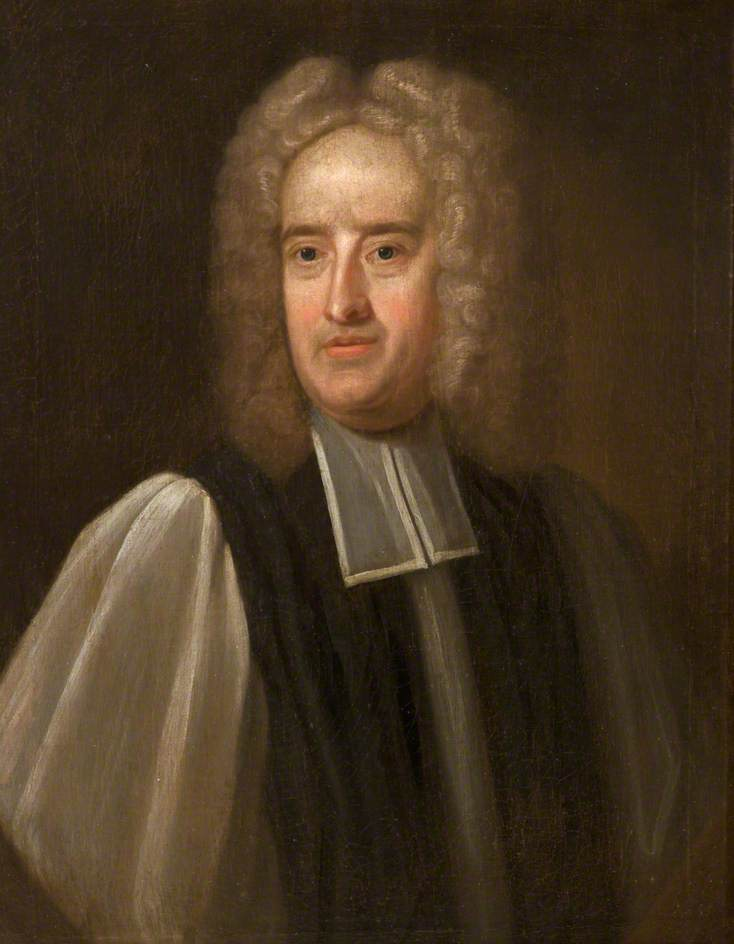
- Church: Church of England
- Diocese: Diocese of Chester
- In office: 1726–1752 (death)
- Predecessor: Francis Gastrell
- Successor: Edmund Keene

Orders
- Ordination: 8 May 1692 by John Hough
- Consecration: 12 April 1726 by Lancelot Blackburne

Personal details
- Baptised: 29 July 1667
- Died: 21 February 1752 (aged 84)
- Buried: Chester Cathedral
- Denomination: Anglican
- Spouse: (1) Anne Browne (m.1699) (2) Anne Birch (m.1712)
- Education: Jesus College, Oxford

Samuel Peploe (bap. 29 July 1667 – 21 February 1752) was Bishop of Chester from 1726 to 1752.

== Life ==
Samuel Peploe was born the son of Podmore Peploe (c. 1641 – 1714) and was baptized at Dawley Parva, Shropshire. He had three brothers, Jonathan, Nathan and Paul, and was educated at Penkridge School, Staffordshire. He then matriculated at Jesus College, University of Oxford, on 12 May 1687, where he graduated and obtained his Bachelor of Arts degree on 12 March 1690 and his Master of Arts degree on 19 October 1693.

After being ordained, Peploe became rector of Kedleston, Derbyshire, in 1695 and vicar of Preston, Lancashire, in 1700. He gained a reputation as an outspoken enemy of the local Roman Catholic inhabitants, who were in the majority. In November 1715, when Jacobite forces came to Preston, Peploe is said to have preached a brave sermon urging support for King George I, who had become king the previous year. His sermons on the dangers of popery also brought him wider attention, and in 1717 he was nominated as the warden of Manchester collegiate church; however, Francis Gastrell, as Bishop of Chester, refused to sanction the appointment on the basis that Peploe's Lambeth degree of Bachelor of Divinity was not a valid qualification. It took many years of litigation before it was ruled that Lambeth degrees, which are awarded by the Archbishop of Canterbury, were of equal status with university degrees. For that reason he returned to Jesus College and obtained his Bachelor of Divinity degree on 10 March 1718.

Gastrell died in 1725 and Peploe, supported by Edmund Gibson (Bishop of London) and the Duke of Newcastle, was appointed. He was consecrated on 12 April 1726 and allowed to continue to hold his Manchester wardenship (which he held until he made way for his son in 1738), although he had to resign his position in Preston. He died on 21 February 1752 with last will dated 24 April 1749 and was buried in Chester Cathedral.

== Family ==
Around 6 June 1699 Peploe married his first wife, Anne Browne, daughter of Thomas Browne of Shredicote (died 1728) and Mary Carr (died 1689) and paternal granddaughter of George Browne of Shredicote (died 1652) and Anne Skyrmshire (died 1691), in turn daughter of Sir Thomas Skyrmshire (1576–1632) and Anne Sneyd, granddaughter of Thomas Skyrmshire of Aqualate, Staffordshire (died 1594) and Alice Starkey, and great-granddaughter of John Skyrmshire of Norbury, Cheshire (died 1569), and Dorothy Talbot. With her he had four children:

- Elizabeth Peploe, married in 1736 to John Bradshaw;
- Rev. Samuel Peploe (1700–1781), Archdeacon of Richmond, who married Elizabeth Birch and had one son and Rebecca Roberts;
- Mary Peploe (1701–1772), wife of Francis Joddrell (died 1765);
- Anne Peploe (1702–1769), wife of James Bayley of Withington (1705–1769) and whose daughter Elizabeth Bayley married Sir John Parker Mosley, 1st Baronet, of Ancoats.

On 8 January 1712 he married secondly Anne Birch, who died in 1758.

Church of England titles
Preceded by Francis Gastrell	Bishop of Chester; 1725-1752	Succeeded by Edmund Keene
