= Robert Mitchell (cricketer) =

Australian cricketer

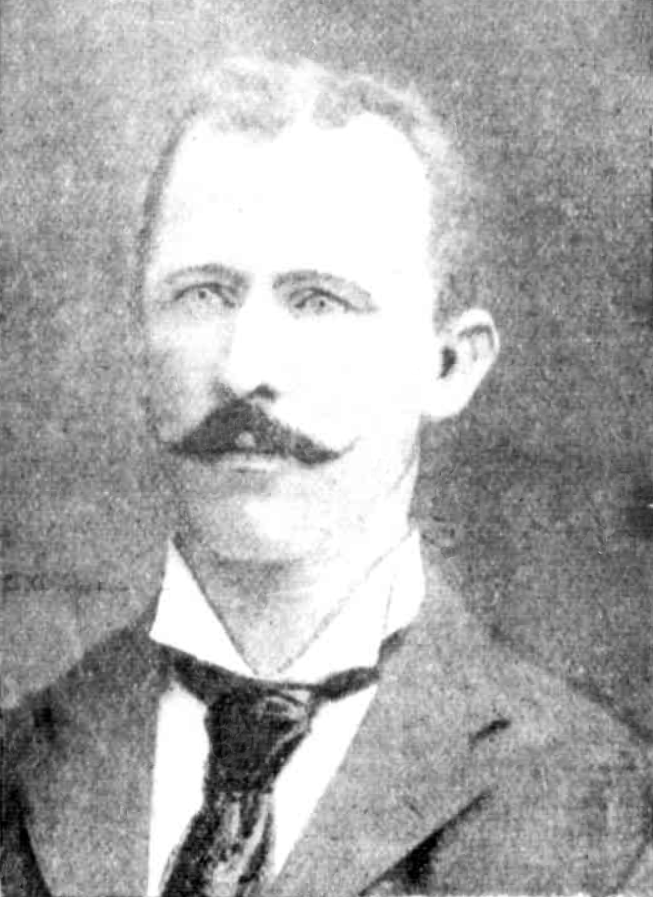

Personal information
- Born: 11 April 1863; Campbellfield, Victoria, Australia
- Died: 17 September 1926 (aged 63); Preston, Victoria, Australia

Domestic team information
- Years: Team
- 1888-1903: Victoria
- Source: Cricinfo, 25 July 2015

Robert Mitchell (11 April 1863 – 17 September 1926) was an Australian cricketer. He played 12 first-class cricket matches for Victoria between 1888 and 1903.

Mitchell began playing for Fitzroy Cricket Club in the 1883/84 season and he played for the club until the 1909/10 season when he transferred to Northcote Cricket Club. He played for Northcote into his late forties and played his last district cricket match when he was fifty years old. He was an all-rounder who was a hard-hitting batsman and slow left-hand bowler. A highlight of his district career was taking 6 for 2 in 1900 in a game where Fitzroy dismissed Carlton for just 13 runs which remained the district record for many years.

== See also ==
- List of Victoria first-class cricketers
