= Alwin Corden Larmour =

The reverend Alwin Corden "Teddie" Larmour (6 January 1886 – 1 November 1946) was a British churchman, school teacher and philatelist who edited The London Philatelist during the Second World War.

== Early life and family ==
Larmour was born in Calcutta, India, on 6 January 1886 to Charles Frederick Larmour and Harriet Adelaide Larmour. He was educated at the University of Cambridge from where he received a Master of Arts degree. He had family philatelic connections, his father was editor of the Philatelic Journal of India and a member of The Philatelic Society, London, as was his uncle, F.A. Larmour. He married Edith Margaret Kenrick in 1928.

== Career ==
In 1909, Larmour became an assistant master at Wellington College, Crowthorne.

== Philately ==
Larmour was a member of the Royal Philatelic Society London and the editor from February 1940 to June 1946 of The London Philatelist, writing as A.C.L. He managed to keep the journal going during the paper rationing and other difficulties of the Second World War by reducing the number of issues to six in some years from the normal twelve. When the main printing works of William Brendon & Sons was destroyed by German bombing in April 1941, a double issue appeared the following month. Outside philately he was a Freemason, being initiated into Isaac Newton University Lodge whilst at Cambridge, he also served as a local councillor.

== Death ==
Larmour died on 1 November 1946 at his home Dumromyn in Crowthorne, Berkshire. He left £12,655.
