= George Cotes =

English academic and Catholic Bishop

The Right Reverend George Cotes
- Bishop of Chester
- Church: Roman Catholic
- Installed: 6 July 1554
- Term ended: 1556
- Predecessor: John Bird
- Successor: Cuthbert Scott

Orders
- Consecration: 1 April 1554 by Edmund Bonner

Personal details
- Died: 1556
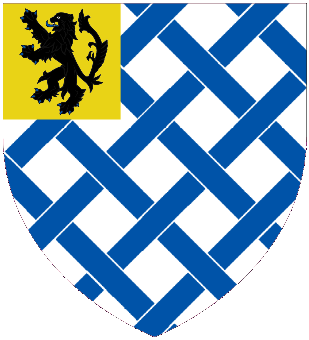
- Coat of arms

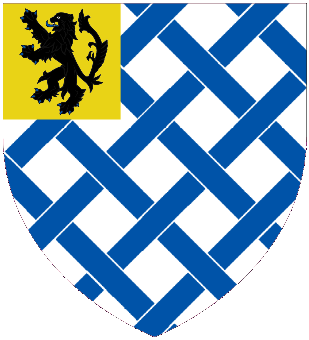
Arms: Argent, fretty Azure, on a canton Or a lion rampant Sable.

George Cotes (or Cotys, Coates) (died 1556) was an English academic and Catholic Bishop of Chester during the English Reformation.

He had been a Fellow of Balliol College, Oxford in 1522, and then became a Fellow of Magdalen College, Oxford in 1527. He was Junior Proctor of Oxford University in 1531. It was some years before he was elected Master of Balliol College, in which post he served in the years 1539–1545.

With the accession of Queen Mary, he was chosen to succeed the former Carmelite John Bird, who had been deprived because he was married, as Bishop of Chester. Cotes was consecrated on 1 April 1554 by bishops Stephen Gardiner of Winchester, Edmund Bonner of London, and Cuthbert Tunstall of Durham, and received papal provision on 6 July 1554. However, he held the post for only a short period of time before he died in c. January 1556.

During the Marian Persecutions he had Protestant George Marsh burnt at the stake as a heretic.

== Notes ==
Academic offices
Preceded by William Whyte	Master of Balliol College, Oxford; 1539–1545	Succeeded by William Wright
Church of England titles
Preceded by John Bird	Bishop of Chester; 1554–1556	Succeeded by Cuthbert Scott
