= Robert A. Mitchell =

Fr. Robert A. Mitchell (19 January 1926 – 5 October 2006) was an American Jesuit. He was born in New York, growing up in the Bronx, and entered the Society of Jesus on July 30, 1943. He subsequently trained in Belgium, where he was ordained in 1956.

His career included appointments as:

- 1959–63: Dean of Le Moyne College
- 1966–72: Provincial of New York
- 1972–76: First president of the Jesuit Conference of the United States
- 1979–90: President of the University of Detroit, then Chancellor of the merged University of Detroit Mercy (1990–92).
- 1993–2000: 10th president of Le Moyne College.
