= Robert Mitchell (weightlifter) =

American weightlifter (1911–1992)

Personal information
- Nationality: American
- Born: October 3, 1911 Sebree, Kentucky, United States
- Died: 1 December 1992 (aged 81) San Diego, California, United States

Sport
- Sport: Weightlifting

Robert Mitchell (October 3, 1911 – December 1, 1992) was an American weightlifter. He competed in the men's lightweight event at the 1936 Summer Olympics. Two years earlier, Mitchell was the US national champion.
