= John Graham (bishop) =

English churchman and academic (1794–1865)

The Right Reverend John Graham
- Bishop of Chester
- Church: Church of England
- Diocese: Diocese of Chester
- In office: 1848 to 1865
- Predecessor: John Bird Sumner
- Successor: William Jacobson
- Other post: Clerk of the Closet (1849–1865)
- Previous post: Master of Christ's College, Cambridge (1830–1849)

Orders
- Consecration: 14 May 1848 by Thomas Musgrave

Personal details
- Born: 23 February 1794 Durham, County Durham, England
- Died: 15 June 1865 (aged 71) Chester, Cheshire, England
- Denomination: Anglicanism
- Education: Durham School; Christ's College, Cambridge
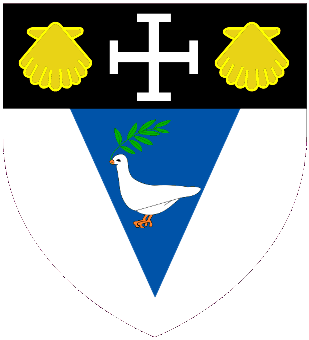
- Coat of arms

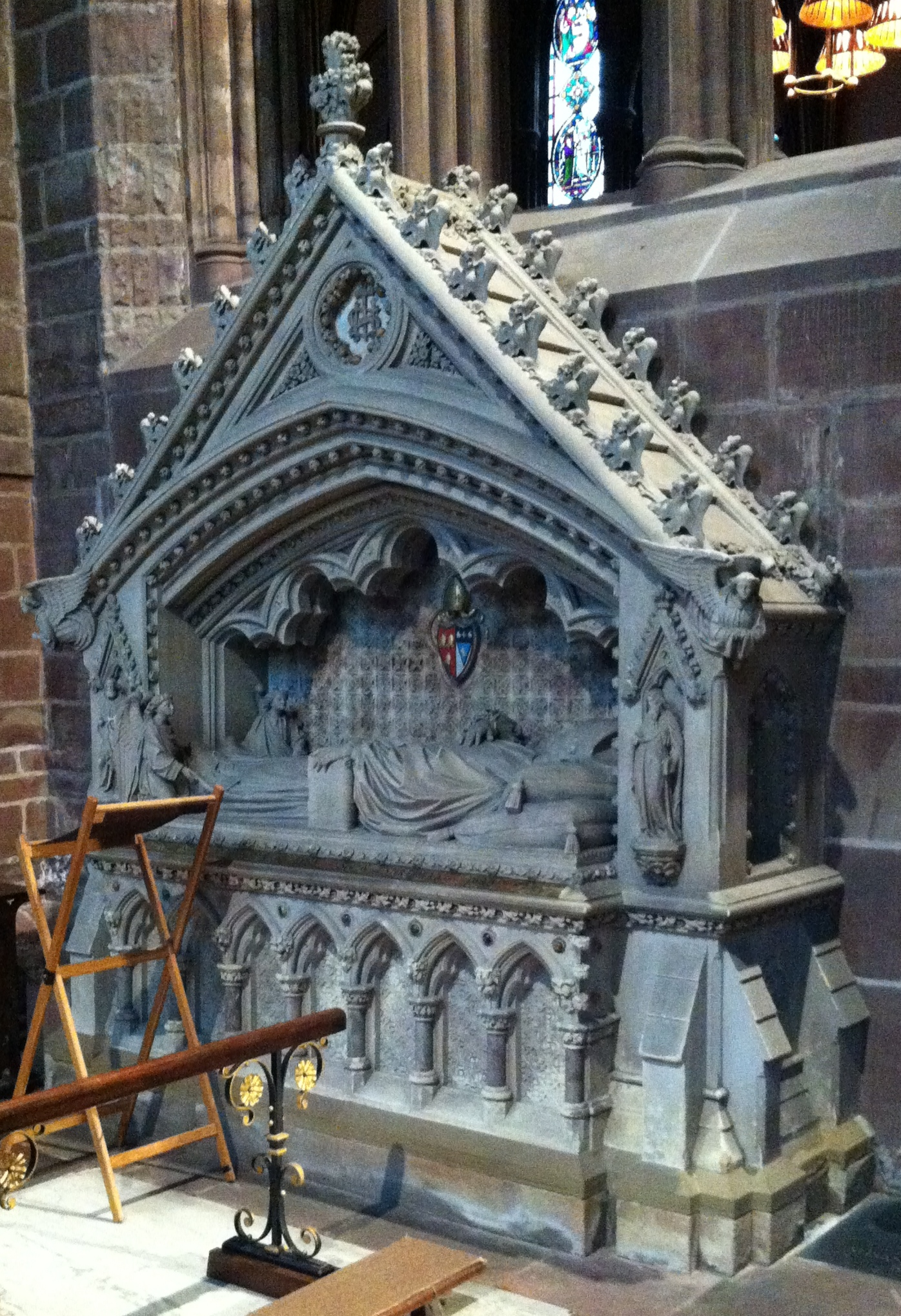
Memorial to Bishop John Graham in Chester Cathedral

John Graham (23 February 1794 – 15 June 1865) was an English churchman and academic. He served as master of Christ's College, Cambridge, from 1830 to 1848, and as Bishop of Chester from 1848 to 1865. Graham died at the Bishop's Palace, Chester, on 15 June 1865, and was buried in Chester Cemetery on 20 June 1865. He tutored Charles Darwin at Cambridge from 1829 to 1830.

== Life ==
Graham, the only son of John Graham, managing clerk to Thomas Griffith of the Bailey, Durham, was born in Claypath, Durham. He was educated at Durham School and at Christ's College, Cambridge, where he attained high proficiency as a classical and mathematical scholar. In 1816 he graduated as fourth wrangler and was bracketed with Marmaduke Lawson as chancellor's medallist, proceeding B.A. in 1816, M.A. in 1819, B.D. in 1829, and D.D. by royal mandate in 1831. He was elected a fellow and tutor of his college in 1816, and on the resignation of Dr John Kaye in 1830, was chosen Master of Christ's College. Although he was a dedicated university teacher, he "never published any work of importance".

In 1828 he was collated to the prebend of Sanctæ Crucis in Lincoln Cathedral, and six years later to the prebend of Leighton Ecclesia in the same diocese. He served twice as vice-chancellor of the university, first in 1831 and again in 1840. It was in the latter year that he admitted Lord Lyndhurst to the office of high steward of the university, and his speech on that occasion is printed in Cooper's Annals of Cambridge.

Ordained in 1818, he became rector of Willingham, Cambridgeshire, in 1843. He was nominated chaplain to Prince Albert on 26 January 1841, and in the contest for the chancellorship of Cambridge University on 27 February 1847 he acted as chairman of the prince's committee.

=== Episcopal ministry ===
Graham had been recommended as the next Bishop of Sodor and Man in 1847, but declined it. In 1848, following the translation of John Bird Sumner to the see of Canterbury, Graham received the vacant bishopric of Chester, and was elected to the see on 1 April. On 14 May 1848, he was consecrated as a bishop at the Chapel Royal, Whitehall; one newspaper noted the service was "but thinly attended". The consecration was led by Thomas Musgrave, Archbishop of York, assisted by John Kaye, the Bishop of Lincoln, and Edward Maltby, Bishop of Durham. On 16 June he was installed in Chester Cathedral. On his departure from Cambridge, the mayor and council of the town presented him with an address of congratulation on his appointment, the only instance in which such a tribute had been offered by that body.

The bishop was a liberal in politics, but seldom spoke or voted in the House of Lords. He was a member of the Oxford and Cambridge Universities Commission and took an active part in its proceedings. His manner of life was simple. His principal aima was to preserve peace within the diocese, though he could be firm when necessary. His conciliatory approach extended to the dissenters of Chester, a stance that caused some offence to the high church party.

On 25 September 1849 he was appointed Clerk of the Closet to the Queen, a position he held until his death. He enjoyed the friendship of the Prince Consort and the respect of the Queen.

== Personal life ==
In 1833 he married Mary, daughter of the Rev. Robert Porteous, by whom he had eight children, the eldest being the Rev. John Graham (1834–1873), registrar of the diocese of Chester.

He died at the Palace, Chester, on 15 June 1865. He was buried in Overleigh Cemetery, Chester, on 20 June. Graham had requested a private funeral with only family and close friends present. Members of the public were restricted to lining the road between the palace and cemetery, and the cemetery itself was guarded by unarmed soldiers from the 64th Regiment. He left between £30,000 and £35,000 in his will (equivalent to between £3,260,000 and £3,690,000 in 2025).

== Publications ==
- Sermons on the Commandments, 1826
- Sermons, 1827, 1837, 1837, 1841, 1845, 1855
- A Charge to the Clergy of the Diocese at the Primary Visitation of the Bishop of Chester, 1849

Some of his sermons are also to be found in the publications of the Church Missionary Society, the Society for Promoting Christian Knowledge, the General Society for Promoting District Visiting, and the African Church Missionary Society.

Academic offices
Preceded by John Kaye	Master of Christ's College, Cambridge; 1830–1849	Succeeded by Joseph Shaw
Church of England titles
Preceded by John Bird Sumner	Bishop of Chester; 1848-1865	Succeeded by William Jacobson
