= Robert Michell (MP for Norwich) =

16th-century English politician

Robert Michell (died 1563), of Norwich, Norfolk, was an English politician.

He was a member of parliament (MP) for Norwich in 1563 and mayor of the city in 1560–61.
