= William Downham =

Former Bishop of Chester

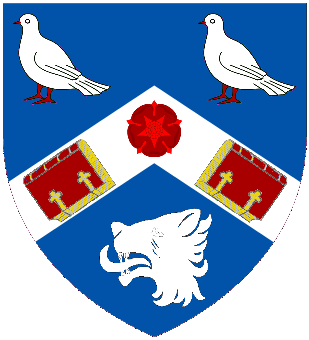
Arms: Azure on a chevron between two doves Argent beaks and legs Gules and a wolf's head erased Argent in base a rose between two books Gules clasped Or.

William Downham (c. 1511 — 1577), otherwise known as William Downman, was Bishop of Chester early in the reign of Elizabeth I, having previously served as her domestic chaplain.

== Early life and priesthood ==
Generally said to have been a native of Norfolk, Downham was probably born in 1511. He is first recorded as one of the Brothers of Penitence, a small Augustinian order based at Ashridge on the border of Buckinghamshire and Hertfordshire. When the order's collegiate church fell victim to the Dissolution in 1539, he was pensioned and obtained admission to Exeter College, Oxford, graduating B.A. in 1541 and becoming a Fellow of Magdalen College in 1543. Five years later, he was appointed Rector of Datchworth, but, probably on account of having married during the reign of Edward VI, he was deprived of the parish following Queen Mary’s accession. His wife’s death may have been the circumstance that allowed his appointment to the vicarage of Edlesborough, near Ashridge, in October 1554.

In November 1555 he resigned the Edlesborough living. A month earlier the queen’s sister, Princess Elizabeth, had returned to her childhood home at the Old Palace in Hatfield following a year’s detention, and it was probably at this point Downham became one of her chaplains and was appointed Rector of the nearby parish of Ayot St Peter. In his service as chaplain he displayed some adroitness, ostensibly adhering to the doctrine and practices of the Roman Church while allowing Elizabeth to perceive him as a candidate for preferment within a Protestant foundation. In 1560, following her accession to the throne and the passing of the Act of Uniformity, Elizabeth made him Archdeacon of Brecon and a Canon of Westminster. As one of the "old flock of Hatfield" he also enjoyed the favour of William Cecil who in the same year repeatedly proposed him for advancement to a bishopric.

== Appointment as Bishop of Chester ==
Such advancement came in 1561 when Downham was made Bishop of Chester, the queen later declaring the appointment was of "our own motion, for the good opinion we conceived of you in your service to us". He was consecrated by Archbishop Thomas Young on 4 May 1561 and on the following day became a member of the ecclesiastical commission formed to strengthen Young's hand in implementing the Elizabethan religious settlement in the northern province. Later in the year he was, alongside Bishops Edmund Grindal and Richard Cox, one of the ecclesiastical commissioners who laid down the rules for dealing with ousted papist clergy, sparing them prosecution and imprisonment but placing restrictions on their movement and requiring security for their future quiet behaviour.

== Struggles ==
He was still in daily attendance on the queen in November 1561, by which date Archbishop Young had commenced a six-month metropolitan visitation of Chester diocese that automatically suspended Downham's episcopal authority. By the time the suspension was lifted, nearly three years had elapsed since the expulsion of his predecessor, Cuthbert Scott. During this interval there had been no concerted enforcement of the Uniformity Act in the diocese, which was 120 miles in length and included the counties of Cheshire and Lancashire, a large part of North Yorkshire and most of Cumbria. Situated in the extreme south-western corner of this tract, the city of Chester was unhappily placed for its oversight and, the diocese having no manorial endowments, Downham was dependent on the hospitality of local gentry when travelling beyond the city. Large numbers of such gentry were Roman Catholic in sympathy (predominantly so in Lancashire) and Downham alienated others by early attempts to correct their dissolute lifestyles.

In July 1562 a special ecclesiastical commission for Chester diocese was established under Downham's presidency, with power to impose fines and sentences of imprisonment for breach of church discipline. The queen later attributed such establishment to a request from Downham supported by his promise that it would preserve his diocese from "disorders". Like other high commissions on which he had served, it was a secular court composed of both clergy and leading members of the laity such as the Earl of Derby, Lord Lieutenant of Lancashire and a cousin of the queen, and Sir John Southworth, High Sheriff of Lancashire in 1562 and MP for the county in the following year. Southworth was uncompromising in his attachment to Roman Catholicism and in 1566 his recusancy resulted in Downham bringing charges against him. Southworth refused to answer to Downham or to Archbishop Young, contending that he would "not find indifference at their hands", and the case was referred to the Privy Council. Southworth was removed from the commission in 1567, in which year Christopher Goodman became a member.

Goodman had, with John Knox, been co-pastor of the English church in exile at Geneva during Queen Mary's reign and afterwards was presented to the living of Aldford by Sir Edward Fitton. He was as extreme in his puritanism as Southworth had been in his papistry and proved a continuing thorn in Downham's side, particularly during the Vestments Controversy; in 1569 he was suspended on Downham's instruction and in 1571 he was disciplined by Archbishop Matthew Parker, to whom Downham had reported him.

Struggles for influence within the commission undermined its effectiveness as an instrument of governance but, from its inception, Downham was as assiduous in attending its sessions as he was regular in his presence at proceedings of his consistory court. In 1564 he compiled a perceptive and candid assessment of the magistracy on whom the enforcement of law was dependent within his diocese, concluding that, of twenty-five justices of the peace in Lancashire, only six could be trusted in religion and of these two were doubtful. His commitment to the Elizabethan religious settlement seems to have been absolute and he enjoyed the confidence of Archbishop Young, assisting at the consecration of Young's suffragan, Robert Barnes, in 1567. In the previous year he had been among five bishops on whom the degree of Doctor of Divinity was conferred at London.

== Apparent loss of favour ==
On 3 February 1568, probably in response to intelligence foreshadowing the Rising of the North, the queen directed Lord Derby, Downham, and their fellow ecclesiastical commissioners to apprehend all persons who "under the pretence of religion draw sundry gentlemen from their allegiance". Derby, anticipating the direction, had already arrested those under suspicion. Perhaps embarrassed by this preemption, Elizabeth turned on Downham. In a letter to him dated 21 February, she referred to "credible reports of disorders and contempts" in his diocese, particularly in Lancashire, on which account she found "great lack in you, being sorry to have our former expectation in this sort deceived". She called on him to root out deprived clergy who were being secretly harboured by recusant gentry in the remoter parts of his diocese and to ensure that all parishes were provided with "honest and well learned curates".

The queen's displeasure with Downham may have followed a complaint to the Privy Council by Goodman's patron Sir Edward Fitton, occasioned by Downham summoning papist suspects to Chester for examination rather than sending them for trial at Lancaster assizes. Goodman is said to have been associated with the complaint but its timing is uncertain and may have followed discoveries made when Downham journeyed throughout his diocese in the summer of 1568. During the course of that year several prominent landowners, including Sir Richard Molyneux (High Sheriff of Lancashire in 1566) and Sir William Norris (High Sheriff in 1545), appeared before the ecclesiastical commission in Chester, recanted their Catholic sympathies, and entered into recognisances for their future conduct such that Downham "hoped he should never be troubled again with the like".

However, in 1570 Downham and Lord Derby were summoned to appear before the Privy Council to answer questions arising out of disorders in Lancashire, particularly in the Archdeaconry of Richmond. The queen was said to fear such disorders had "come to pass through (Downham’s) remissness in not looking diligently to the charge committed unto him", and his conduct was referred to Archbishop Parker for consideration by the church in convocation. Goodman's part in engineering the queen's concern is not apparent but in 1572 he was appointed Archdeacon of Richmond, his new patron the Earl of Leicester pressuring Downham into making the appointment.

Commentators have suggested that by 1572 Downham was "in complete disgrace for his continued failure to prosecute any kind of reform", having been subjected to "final shame" in 1570. Such remarks reflect the tendency of modern historians to dismiss him as "weak", "indolent" or "negligent" and either "sound asleep" or "papist" in his role as bishop. This portrayal contrasts with the 19th century assessment of Downham as "very rigid in enforcing conformity" and active in policing and sanctioning the conduct of his clergy. It is also substantially challenged by a recent reappraisal of the man and of events during his tenure of office.

== Last years of his episcopate ==
In June 1574 the Privy Council gave Downham and the Earl of Derby (son of the previous commissioner) a fresh charge to investigate disorders in Lancashire. The extent of the council's concern appears from its July letter of thanks to Derby for rooting out abuses in the county which was described as "the very sink of popery where more unlawful acts have been committed and more unlawful persons held secret than in other part of the realm". By its November letter, acknowledging Downham's report on "proceedings against obstinate people" in Lancashire, the Council offered to provide any needful assistance requested and assured Downham and Derby that "by their diligence herein they shall deserve thanks at Her Majesty’s hands".

In February 1576 Downham forwarded to the council a return of recusants within his diocese, categorised according to whether they remained "obstinate" or, after examination by him, were considered "conformable". He died in the following year but the return is said to have provided terms of reference for a new ecclesiastical commission acting in conjunction with the Council of the North.

Downing was buried in the choir of Chester Cathedral where a brass plate on his tomb carried the date 3 December 1577, probably the day of his burial because his death is generally said to have occurred in November that year.

== Legacy ==
Even a confederate of his opponent Goodman remembered Downham as "a mild, courteous and loving man, wishing well unto all". In applying the Uniformity Act he tried to persuade rather than persecute. He considered the laity of his diocese to be inherently tractable, believed in the power of prayer as a unifying force, and regarded skilled preaching as the means of bringing "many obstinate and wilful people into conformity and obedience". It has been suggested his conciliatory approach may have served to preserve order through most of his diocese during the Northern Rebellion, but the extent of outward conformity he was able to secure belied the underlying strength and proliferation of Roman Catholic sentiment that became manifest after his death.

== Personal life and family ==
An account of Downing's financial circumstances during his time as bishop appears in his 1568 letter to William Cecil.

He married for a second time, probably around 1565. The marriage probably diminished his favour with the queen, who strongly preferred her clergy to remain single. By his second wife he was father of Bishop George Downame, of the theologian John Downame, and of a daughter who became the first wife of Roger Bradshaw (1572-1625) of Pennington.

== Notes ==
Church of England titles
Preceded by Cuthbert Scott	Bishop of Chester; 1561–1577	Succeeded by William Chaderton
