= Robert Mitchell (geologist) =

American geology professor

Robert "Bob" Mitchell
- Title: Digges Distinguished Professor

Academic background
- Education: University of Wisconsin–River Falls (BS); Michigan Technological University (MS, PhD); University of Minnesota Duluth (MS)
- Thesis: Nonideal Flow and Solute Transport in Unsaturated Porous Media: A Modeling Study (1996)
- Doctoral advisor: Alex S. Mayer

Academic work
- Discipline: Geologist; hydrogeologist
- Institutions: Western Washington University
- Website: kula.geol.wwu.edu/rjmitch/

Robert John Mitchell is an American geologist and Digges Distinguished Professor of Engineering Geology at Western Washington University. Mitchell, as a professor in the Geology Department, conducts research and teaches courses on the topics of engineering geology and hydrogeology, as well as numerical modeling of hydrology and water resources. He was a Washington-licensed hydrogeologist under a specialty geologist license from 2002 until 2018.

== Personal life and education ==
Mitchell's hometown is Hudson, Wisconsin. He received a B.S. degree in geology (with a minor in math) from the University of Wisconsin–River Falls in 1983, and also holds a 1986 M.S. in geophysics from Michigan Technological University and a 1990 M.S. in physics from University of Minnesota Duluth. He received his Ph.D. in environmental engineering from Michigan Technological University in 1996, with a thesis entitled Nonideal Flow and Solute Transport in Unsaturated Porous Media: A Modeling Study, advised by Alex S. Mayer. Mitchell joined the faculty of Western Washington University that same year.

== Career ==
Mitchell holds the Robert H. and Kathleen Digges Distinguished Professorship in the Geology Department at Western Washington University. Mitchell's research studies climate change resilience and the climate's effects on water resources and hillslope processes.

Mitchell served on the Washington Geologist Licensing Board in 2014, and also served as the chair of the Environmental & Engineering Geology Division of the Geological Society of America from 2020 to 2021. He is a member of the Geological Society of America and a contributor to the Science Education Resource Center at Carleton College and the State of Washington Water Research Center at Washington State University.

== Awards ==
Mitchell was a 2019 inductee into the University of Minnesota Duluth's Swenson College Academy of Science & Engineering. In 2022, he won an EEGD Meritorious Service Award from the Geological Society of America.
