= John Reading (priest) =

English priest of Calvinist views and Biblical commentator

- Minister of St Mary's Church, Dover; Rector of Chartham; Canon of Canterbury

Orders
- Ordination: c. 1610s

Personal details
- Born: 1588 Buckinghamshire, England
- Died: October 26, 1667 Chartham, Kent, England
- Occupation: Priest, Biblical commentator
- Education: Magdalen Hall, Oxford; St Mary Hall, Oxford

John Reading (1588–1667) was an English priest of Calvinist views and Biblical commentator.

== Life ==
He was born of poor parents in Buckinghamshire. He matriculated at Magdalen Hall, Oxford, on 4 May 1604, and graduated Bachelor of Arts (BA) on 17 October 1607. When he proceeded Oxford Master of Arts (MA Oxon) on 22 June 1610, he was described as of St Mary Hall. Taking holy orders, he became about 1614 chaplain to Edward la Zouche, 11th Baron Zouche of Haringeworth, Lord Warden of the Cinque Ports and governor of Dover Castle.

After preaching at Dover many sermons before his patron, Reading was on 2 December 1616, at the request of the parishioners, appointed minister of St Mary's Church, Dover. He secured a position of influence in the town, and subsequently became chaplain to Charles I and Bachelor of Divinity (BD) Although his sermons advocated Puritan principles, he supported the king's cause in the English Civil War.

In 1642 his study at Dover was plundered by parliamentary soldiers, and he was imprisoned for nineteen months. By direction of Charles I, William Laud, then a prisoner in the Tower of London, gave Reading the rectory of Chartham, Kent, on 27 January 1643. The House of Commons declined to sanction Reading's institution, and appointed Edward Corbett. Laud refused to abandon Reading, and the house passed on that ground an ordinance sequestrating the archbishop's temporalities. A prebend in Canterbury which was bestowed on Reading at the same time brought him no advantage.

In July 1644 he was presented by William Brockman to the living of Cheriton, Kent, and in the same year Reading was appointed by the Westminster Assembly to be one of nine commissioned to write annotations on the New Testament. These were published in ‘Annotations upon all the Books of the Old and New Testament, wherein the Text is explained, Doubts resolved, Scriptures paralleled, and various Readings observed,’ London, 1645, 1651, and 1657. But shortly after 1645, on the discovery of a plot for the capture of Dover Castle by the royalists, he was arrested by command of Major John Boys, and hurried to Dover Castle, and next day to Leeds Castle. There he composed the “Guide to the Holy City.”’ He was at length discharged by the parliamentary committee for Kent, and the restitution of his goods was ordered; but his livings were sequestered. On 8 January 1647 he was a prisoner in the Fleet Prison. On 10 March 1650 he attacked the right of unordained preaching in a public disputation with the baptist Samuel Fisher of Folkestone. Fisher used arguments from Jeremy Taylor's “Discourse of the Liberty of Prophesying,”’ which Reading had already criticised in print.

Reading was restored to his Dover living shortly before the English Restoration of 1660. On 25 May 1660 he presented to Charles II, on his first landing, a large bible with gold clasps, in the name of the corporation of Dover, and made a short speech, which was published as a broadside. He was shortly afterwards restored to Chartham, made canon of the eighth prebend of Canterbury, and reinstituted to Cheriton on 18 July . In October following the university of Oxford conferred on him the degree of Doctor of Divinity (DD) per literas regias. Before August 1662 he resigned the living at Dover.

He died on 26 October 1667, and was buried on the 30th in the parish church of Chartham. His son Thomas, of Christ Church, Oxford, born in 1623, proceeded MA Oxon in July 1647 when ‘lately freed from prison.’

== Works ==
The works of Reading, who in doctrinal terms was a strict Calvinist, include:

- ‘A Grain of Incense, or Supplication for the Peace of Jerusalem, the Church and State,’ London [8 April], 1643.
- ‘An Evening Sacrifice, or Prayer for a Family necessary for these calamitous Times,’ London, 1643.
- ‘Brief Instructions concerning the holy Sacrament for their use who propose to receive the Lord's Supper,’ London, 1645.
- ‘Little Benjamin, or Truth discovering Error; being a clear and full Answer unto the Letter subscribed by forty-seven Ministers of the Province of London, and presented to his Excellency, January 18, 1648 … by J. R., a reall lover of all those who love peace and truth,’ London, 1648.
- ‘The Ranter's Ranting, with the apprehending Examinations and Confession of John Collins and five more, also their several kinds of mirth and dancing (by J. R.),’ London, 2 Dec. 1650.
- ‘A Guide to the Holy City, or Directions and Helps to an Holy Life,’ Oxford, 1651.
- ‘An Antidote against Anabaptism,’ in part a criticism of Jeremy Taylor's ‘Liberty of Prophesying,’ London, 1645. An edition of 1655 bears the title, ‘Anabaptism routed,’ and is dedicated (8 December 1653) to Sir William Brockman, kt., and his wife.
- ‘Christmas revived, or an Answer to certain Objections made against the Observation of a Day in memory of our Saviour Christ his birth,’ London, 1660. Dedicated to ‘my honoured kinsman, Mr. William Rooke.’ A sermon of his, delivered in Canterbury Cathedral (London, 1663), of which a copy is in the Bodleian Library, contains a defence of church music.

Reading also left in manuscript, ready for the press, among other works, ‘A large Comment, Paraphrase, and Explication on the whole New Testament,’ in Latin, dedicated to George Monck, and sent to be printed at London in 1666; but, because of the Great Fire of London, was delivered into the hands of Matthew Wren, bishop of Ely.
