= Robert Edward Mitchell =

American historian

Robert Edward Mitchell is an American historian, currently the Marcello Lotti Professor of English at Duke University.
