= James Cartmell (academic) =

Master of Christ's College, Cambridge (1810–1887)

The Rev James Cartmell, D.D. (13 November 1810– 23 January 1887) was Master of Christ's College, Cambridge from 1849 to 1881.

He went to Carlisle Grammar School, after which he spent the rest of his life at Christ's. He was successively undergraduate, fellow and tutor before his long mastership. While at Cambridge he was Worshipful Master of Isaac Newton University Lodge.

Academic offices
Preceded by Joseph Shaw	Master of Christ's College, Cambridge; 1849–1881	Succeeded by Charles Anthony Swainson
