= Robert Williams Michell =

British surgeon

Robert Williams Michell FRCS (25 August 1863 – 20 July 1916) was a British surgeon.

Born in Truro, he was educated at Honiton School and Cambridge University. He worked at St Bartholomew's Hospital.

He served as an army surgeon with the RAMC in both the Boer War and the First World War. During the latter he was mentioned in dispatches. He sustained wounds while searching for casualties in no man's land, was brought back to Britain, where he died. He was reportedly recommended for the Victoria Cross, but ultimately it was not awarded.

He is buried in the Parish of the Ascension Burial Ground in Cambridge.

The Michell Cup a college rowing cup at Cambridge is named for him.

He was also an active Freemason, being a member of both Isaac Newton University Lodge and Alma Mater Lodge.
