= Alde–Ore Estuary =

Estuary on the Suffolk coast of England

Coordinates: 52.1°N 1.5°E

- Site of Special Scientific Interest
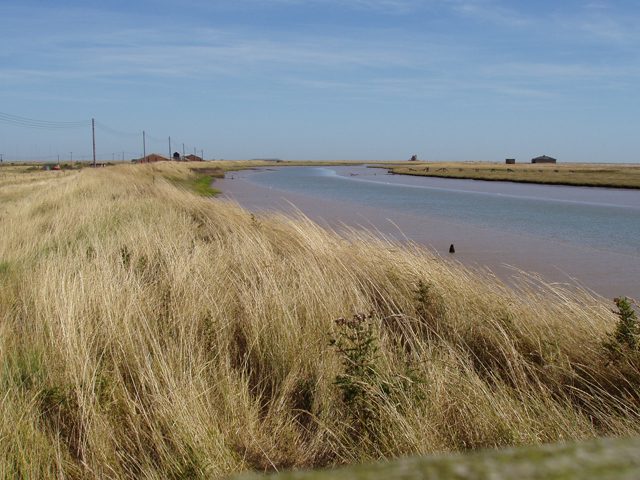
- Location of Alde–Ore Estuary.
- Area of search: Suffolk
- Grid reference: TM 425 512
- Interest: Biological; Geological
- Area: 2,534 hectares
- Notification date: 1992
- Location map: Magic Map

Designations

Ramsar Wetland
- Official name: Alde-Ore Estuary
- Designated: 4 October 1996
- Reference no.: 862

Alde–Ore Estuary is a 2,534 hectare biological and geological Site of Special Scientific Interest which stretches along the Suffolk coast between Aldeburgh and Bawdsey, and also includes parts of the Alde, Ore and Butley Rivers. It is in the Suffolk Coast and Heaths Area of Outstanding Natural Beauty, and is a Grade I Nature Conservation Review site, a Special Area of Conservation, a Ramsar internationally important wetland site, and a Special Protection Area under the European Union Directive on the Conservation of Wild Birds. It includes two Geological Conservation Review sites, "Orfordness and Shingle Street" and "The Cliff, Gedgrave", and two nature reserves managed by the Suffolk Wildlife Trust, Alde Mudflats and Simpson's Saltings. The coastal part of the site is Orfordness-Havergate, a National Nature Reserve, and Orford Ness is managed by the National Trust, while Havergate Island is managed by the Royal Society for the Protection of Birds.

Natural England describes the scientific interests of the site as "outstanding and diverse". Habitats include grassland, fresh water, ditches, reedbeds, saltmarsh, mudflats, brackish lagoons, and the second largest and best preserved area of vegetated shingle in Britain. The birdlife is nationally important, and there are several rare spiders. Gedgrave Cliff has fossiliferous strata dating to the early Pliocene Coralline Crag Formation.
