= Capel St Andrew =

Village in Suffolk, England

Coordinates: 52.080°N 1.455°E

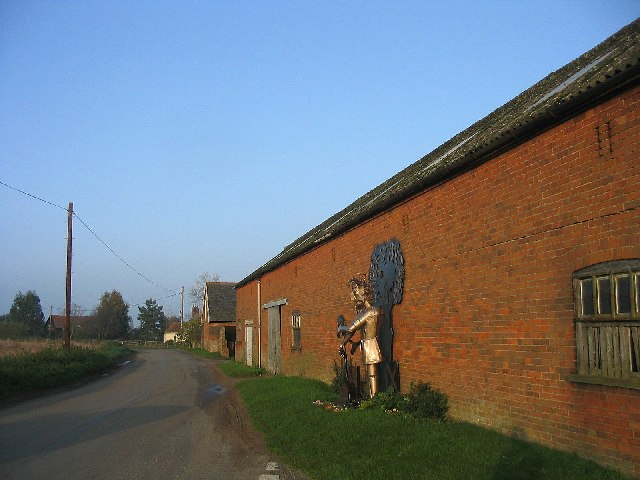
- Metalwork sculpture on a barn wall at Capel St Andrew

- Location within Suffolk
- Population: 76 (2021 census)
- Civil parish: Capel St Andrew
- District: East Suffolk
- Shire county: Suffolk
- Region: East
- Country: England
- Sovereign state: United Kingdom
- Post town: Woodbridge
- Postcode district: IP12
- Police: Suffolk
- Fire: Suffolk
- Ambulance: East of England
- UK Parliament: Suffolk Coastal

Capel St Andrew is a village and civil parish in the East Suffolk district, in the county of Suffolk, England. It is near the larger settlement of Orford. In 2021 the parish had a population of 76. From 1974 to 2019 it was in Suffolk Coastal district.

Capel St Andrew is close to the River Butley, which is a tributary to the River Ore. A small ferry service runs from close to Capel St Andrew across the River Butley and gives cyclists and walkers easy access to Orford. To the east of the village lie the RSPB reserve at Boyton Marshes.

Capel St Andrew was referred to as Capeles in the Domesday Book, which is derived from the Latin for "chapel". Despite being named after a church, the village does not have a church any more. The church was demolished between 1529 and 1553.
