= Deben Registration District =

Deben is a British Registration district in Suffolk, England. It is an administrative region which exists for the purpose of civil registration of births, marriages, and deaths and civil partnerships. The Register office for the district is at Woodbridge, Suffolk.

The district was formed on the 1 April 1935 from parts of the Woodbridge, Plomesgate and Mildenhall registration districts. The district includes the following parishes:

- Aldeburgh
- Alderton
- Bawdsey
- Blaxhall
- Boulge
- Boyton
- Bredfield
- Bromeswell
- Burgh
- Capel St. Andrew
- Charsfield
- Chillesford
- Clopton
- Culpho
- Dallinghoo
- Dallinghoo Wield
- Debach
- Foxhall
- Gedgrave
- Great Bealings
- Grundisburgh
- Hasketon
- Havergate Island
- Hollesley
- Iken
- Kesgrave
- Little Bealings
- Martlesham
- Melton
- Orford
- Otley
- Pettistree
- Playford
- Purdis Farm
- Ramsholt
- Rushmere St. Andrew
- Shottisham
- Stratton Hall
- Sudbourne
- Sutton
- Tuddenham St. Martin
- Tunstall
- Ufford
- Wantisden
- Westerfield
- Wickham Market
- Witnesham
- Woodbridge
