= Orford Town Hall =

Municipal building in Orford, Suffolk, England

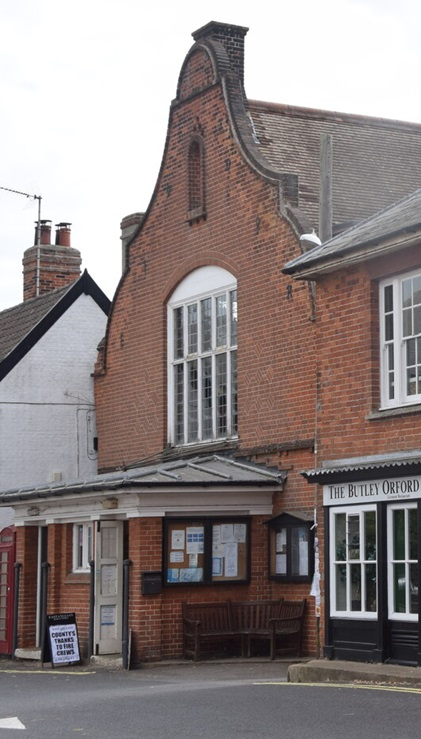
- The building in 2022

- Shown in Suffolk
- 52.0945°N 1.5341°E
- Location: Market Hill, Orford

History
- Built: 1902

Site notes
- Architect(s): Harry Sirr and Edwin Rope
- Architectural style: Edwardian Baroque style

Listed Building – Grade II
- Official name: Town Hall
- Designated: 16 January 1984
- Reference no.: 1198392

Orford Town Hall is a municipal building on Market Hill in Orford, a town in Suffolk, in England. The building, which currently accommodates the offices and meeting place of Orford and Gedgrave Parish Council, is a Grade II listed building.

== History ==
The first municipal building in the town was an ancient town hall. It was a small building which accommodated meetings of the borough officials as well as the petty session hearings. Orford had a very small electorate and a dominant patron, Francis Seymour-Conway, 3rd Marquess of Hertford, which meant it was recognised by the UK Parliament as a rotten borough. Its right to elect members of parliament was removed by the Reform Act 1832, and its borough council, which had met in the town hall, was abolished under the Municipal Corporations Act 1883. Its assets were subsequently transferred to a specially formed entity, the Orford Town Trust.

In the late 19th century, parish officials decided to commission a new town hall. The new building was designed by Harry Sirr and Edwin Rope in the Edwardian Baroque style, built in red brick and was completed in 1902. The design involved a symmetrical main frontage facing onto Market Hill. There was an opening on the ground floor (which was later enhanced by a wide porch), a five-light mullioned and transomed window on the first floor and a niche in the stepped gable above. Internally, the principal room was the main assembly hall.

During the First World War, an armament experimental station was established at Orford Ness and, due to the lack of adequate accommodation at Orford Ness, the station headquarters was formed in the town hall. Later, the town hall was used for concerts: a rehearsal of the one-act opera, Noye's Fludde, by the British composer, Benjamin Britten, took place there in 1958.

In October 2008, an exhibition was held in the town hall to celebrate the 60th anniversary of the return of the residents of Sudbourne and Iken to their homes after the area had been used for training by 79th Armoured Division during the Second World War. In February 2014, a not-for-profit entity was established to arrange weekly film shows in the town hall, and it also continued to host meetings of the Orford and Gedgrave Parish Council.

The art collector, Sir Richard Wallace, 1st Baronet, who lived at Sudbourne Hall and who established the Wallace Collection, commissioned three large oil paintings by the French artist, Alfred Charles Ferdinand Decaen, depicting his shooting parties (On Sudbourne Hill (1874); Shooting Luncheon at the Great Wood Sudbourne (1876); Battue de perdreaux dans la comté de Suffolk (1880)), all of which are now displayed in the town hall.
