= Butley =

Butley may refer to:

- Butley, Suffolk, a village in Suffolk, England
- Butley River, a tributary of the River Ore in Suffolk, England
- Butley (play), a 1971 play by Simon Gray
- Butley (film), a 1974 film directed by Harold Pinter based on play Butley

== See also ==
- Butleigh
