= Orford (painting) =

Painting by Clarkson Stanfield

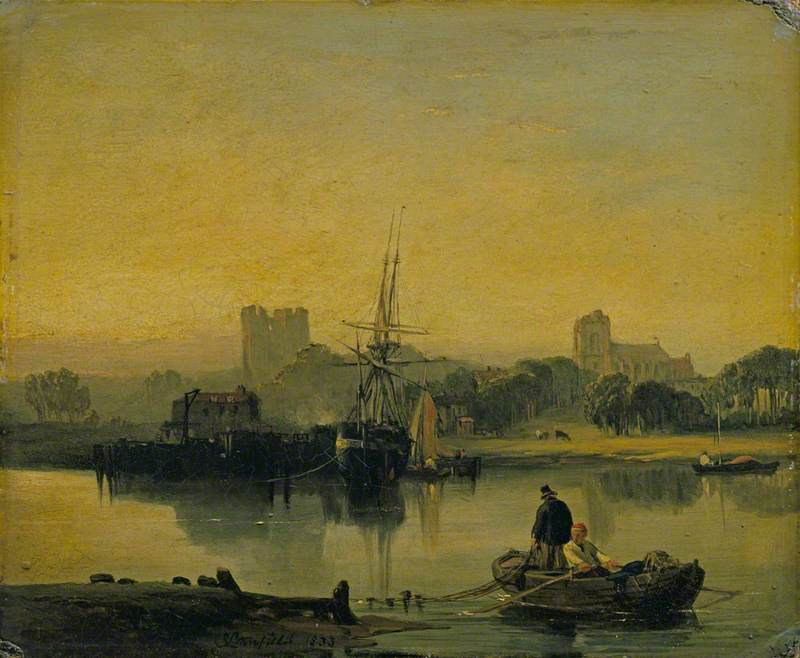
- Artist: Clarkson Stanfield
- Year: 1833
- Medium: Oil on canvas, landscape painting
- Dimensions: 25 cm × 30.5 cm (9.8 in × 12.0 in)
- Location: Wallace Collection; London

Orford is an 1833 landscape painting by the British artist Clarkson Stanfield. It depicts a view of the port of Orford in Suffolk. Historically a significant settlement, which had its own parliamentary constituency until the Great Reform Act of 1832, it had declined by the time he painted it. It depicts the town from across the River Ore.

Stanfield, a former sailor best known as a marine painter, was in East Anglia to prepare sketches for an edition of the works of the poet George Crabbe being prepared by the publisher John Murray. Stylistically it echoes the work of Richard Parkes Bonnington and is one of only a small number of landscapes of England he produced. Today the painting is in the Wallace Collection in London, having been acquired in 1875 by Sir Richard Wallace. A related watercolour was sold at Sotheby's in 1986.

== Bibliography ==
- Bury, Stephen (ed.) Benezit Dictionary of British Graphic Artists and Illustrators, Volume 1. OUP, 2012.
- Van der Merwe, Pieter & Took, Roger. The Spectacular career of Clarkson Stanfield. Tyne and Wear County Council Museums, 1979.
