= John Lapsley =

Royal Air Force Air Marshal (1916-1995)

Sir John Hugh Lapsley KBE CB DFC AFC
- Born: 24 September 1916; India
- Died: 21 September 1995 (aged 78); Deben, Suffolk, England
- Military career
- Allegiance: United Kingdom
- Branch: Royal Air Force
- Service years: 1932–1973
- Rank: Air Marshal
- Commands: Coastal Command (1968–69); No. 19 (Reconnaissance) Group (1967–68); RAF Wahn (1954–56); Air Fighting Development Squadron (1949–51); No. 74 Squadron (1947–49); No. 125 Wing (1943–44); No. 274 Squadron (1941)
- Conflicts: Second World War
- Awards: Knight Commander of the Order of the British Empire; Companion of the Order of the Bath; Distinguished Flying Cross; Air Force Cross; Mentioned in Despatches (2)
- Other work: Save the Children Fund

Air Marshal Sir John Hugh Lapsley (24 September 1916 – 21 November 1995) was a British fighter pilot of the Second World War and, later, a senior Royal Air Force commander.

== RAF career ==
Lapsely joined the Royal Air Force as an Aircraft Apprentice in 1935 later being awarded a cadetship at the RAF College Cranwell. In 1937 he was appointed to a permanent commission and a posting to No. 32 Squadron. By February 1941 he was in command of No. 274 Squadron in Malta, originally with Gloster Gladiator biplane fighters which were soon replaced by the Hawker Hurricane. He was shot down near Tobruk on 19 April 1941 and was repatriated back to England to recover. At first he was only fit for instructional duties but by 1943 he was in command of No. 125 Wing with the Hawker Typhoon fighter bomber.

After the war he attended the RAF Staff College, Bracknell and then became Officer Commanding No. 74 Squadron before taking command of the Air Fighting Development Squadron in 1949 and then taking over responsibility for Flying at the Central Flying Establishment in 1951. He went on to be Station Commander at RAF Wahn in 1954, Deputy Chief of Staff at Headquarters Second Tactical Air Force in 1961 and Director of the Defence Operations Staff on formation of the Ministry of Defence in 1964. He became Air Officer Commanding No. 19 (Reconnaissance) Group in 1967 and Air Officer Commander-in-Chief, Coastal Command in 1968. Whilst serving as Commander-in Chief won Coastal Commands Scratch Golf Championship in 1969. In that capacity he accepted the first Nimrod aircraft into service in October 1969. His last appointment was as Head of the British Defence Staff in Washington, D.C. in 1970 before retiring in 1973. Whilst serving as Commander-in Chief he won Coastal Command's Scratch Golf Championship in 1969.

In retirement he became Director General of the Save the Children Fund.

He is buried in the churchyard of St Mary's at Benhall in Suffolk.

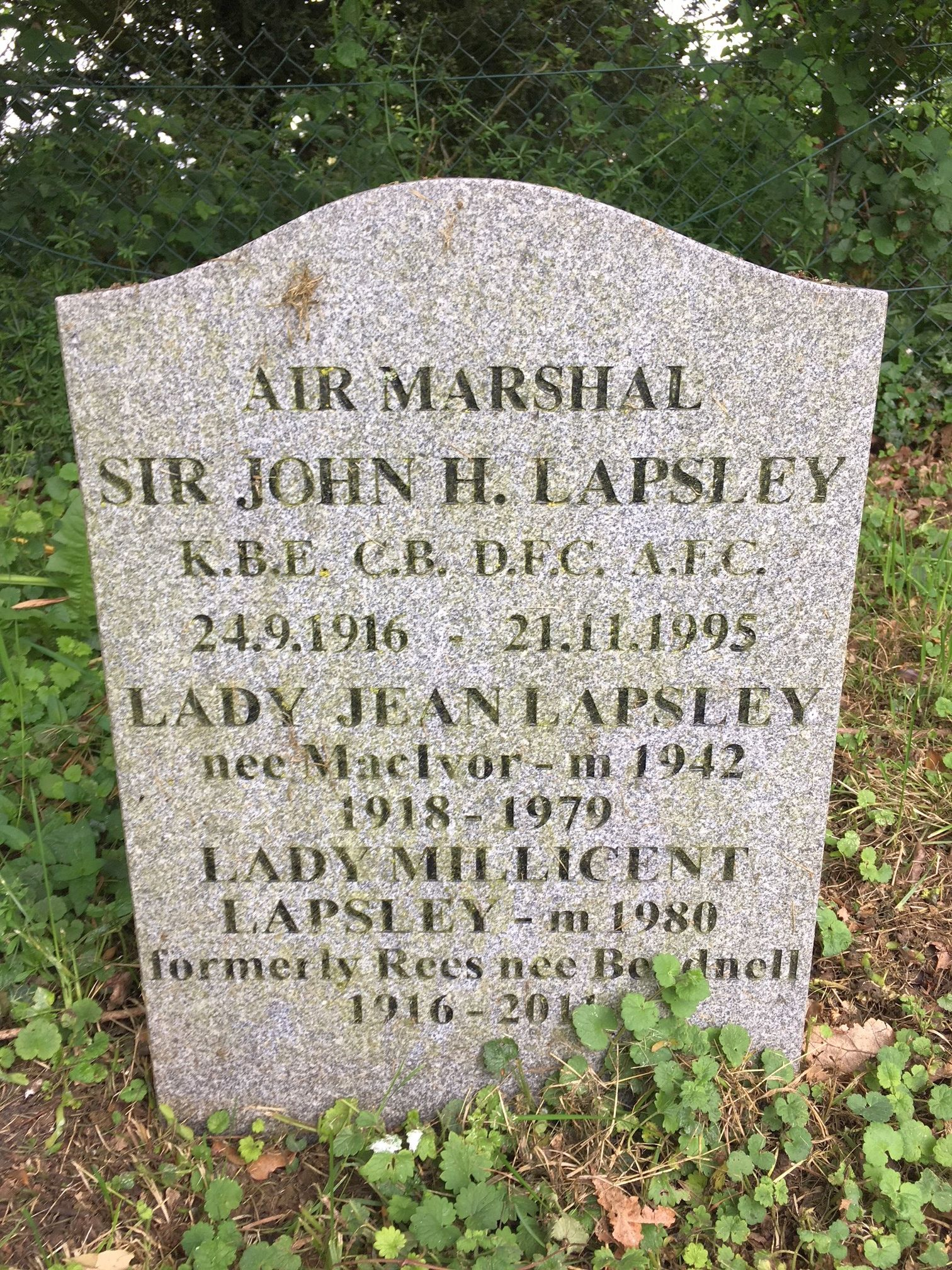
The grave of John Lapsley in the churchyard of St Mary's, Benhall

Military offices
Preceded by Sir Paul Holder	Air Officer Commanding-in-Chief Coastal Command; 1968–1969	Subsumed into Strike Command
Preceded by Sir George Lea	Head of the British Defence Staff in Washington, D.C. 1970–1973	Succeeded by Sir Ian Easton
