= Havergate Island =

Island in Suffolk, England

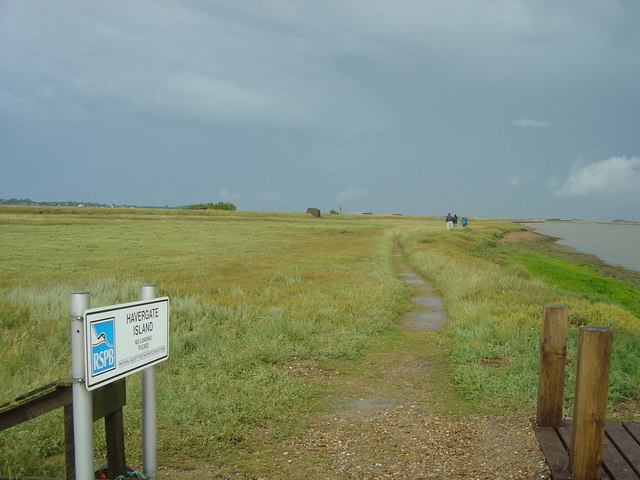
- Salt marsh on Havergate Island, looking north-east from the landing jetty

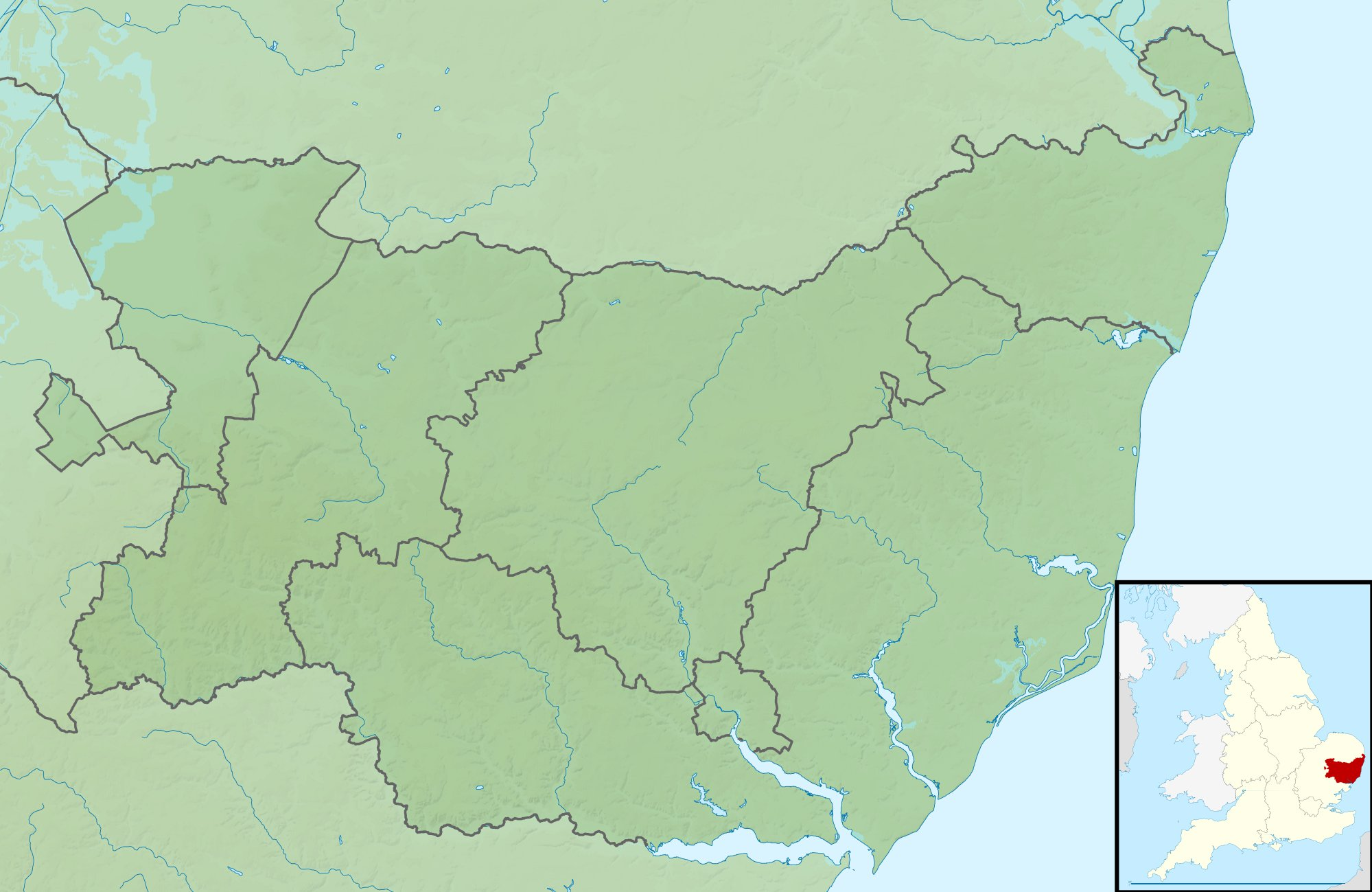
- Location within Suffolk
- Location: Suffolk, East of England, England
- Coordinates: 52°04′19″N 01°31′12″E
- Length: 3.2 km (2.0 mi)
- Width: 0.8 km (0.50 mi)
- Area: 1.08 km^{2} (0.42 sq mi)
- Established: 1948
- Operator: Royal Society for the Protection of Birds
- Website: RSPB Reserves - Havergate Island

Havergate Island is an island in the civil parish of Orford, in the East Suffolk district, in the county of Suffolk, England. It is the only island entirely located within Suffolk. It is found at the confluence of the River Ore and the Butley River near the village of Orford. It is a marshy nature reserve run by the Royal Society for the Protection of Birds (RSPB) and is known for its population of pied avocets and terns. It is part of the ecologically important Alde-Ore Estuary and has protected conservation status as part of a national nature reserve, SSSI, SAC, SPA, Ramsar Site and is also a part of the Suffolk Coast and Heaths AONB.

The island, which is 2 miles (3.2 km) long and 1/2 mile (0.80 km) across at its widest point and covers 267 acres (1.08 km^{2}), lies in the Alder and Ore estuary and is protected from the North Sea by the shingle spit of Orford Ness. It is bounded by the river channels known locally as "The Gull", "Lower Gull" and "The Narrows".

== Ecology ==
Havergate Island comprises six salt water lagoons covering 60 hectares, surrounded by earthen banks. There are also 40 hectares of salt marsh and four hectares of vegetated shingle. There are also areas of grazing marsh and mud flats, and the site provides important habitat for rare gulls, wading birds and other species.

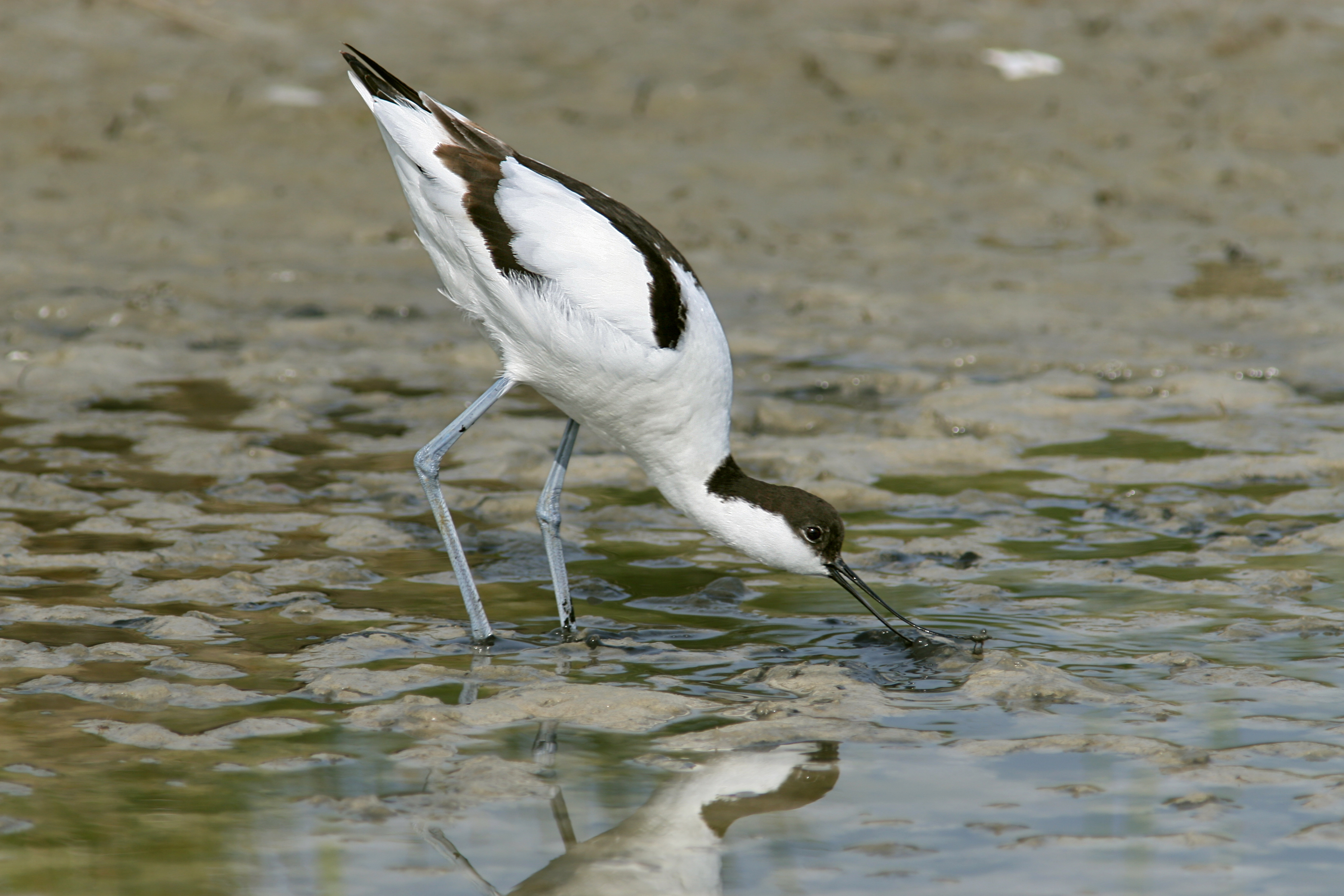
Adult pied avocet (Recurvirostra avosetta) feeding on mud flats

The island is an important breeding, roosting and feeding site for many migratory and resident bird species. The UK's largest breeding population of pied avocets and Suffolk's only breeding Sandwich terns can be found there. Other birds found on the island include Eurasian oystercatchers, redshanks, ringed plovers, golden plover, dunlin, greenshank and ruddy turnstones as well Eurasian wigeon, pintail and northern wheatears. The lagoons and marshes make it an important roosting and feeding site .

Birds of prey including short-eared owls and Western marsh harriers have also been seen hunting over the island. Mammals on the island include mice, voles and a stable population of around 29 hares. Common seals have also been spotted in the river around the island. Butterfly species commonly found on the island include skippers, small coppers, walls, meadow browns and gatekeepers.

== Conservation ==
=== Protected status ===
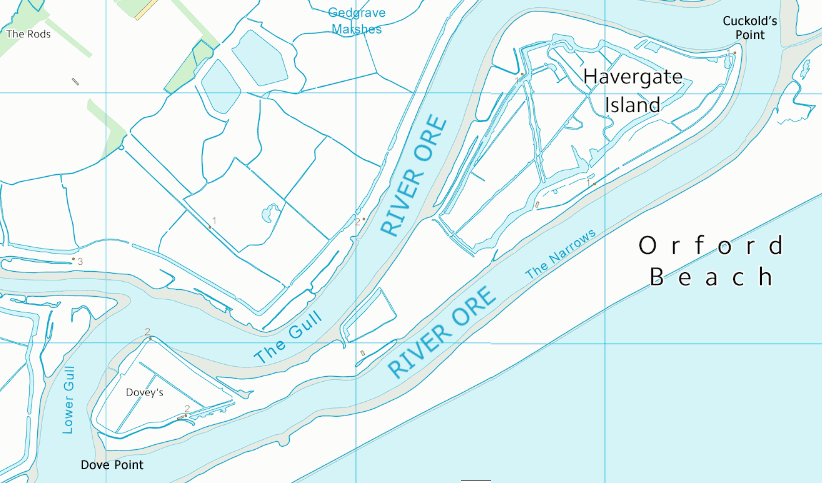
Map of Havergate Island

Havergate Island, together with the National Trust managed Orford Ness site is a designated national nature reserve. The island is also included in the Alde-Ore Estuary Site of Special Scientific Interest (SSSI); the Alde, Ore & Butley Estuaries Special Area of Conservation (SAC); the Alde-Ore Estuary Special Protection Area (SPA); the Alde-Ore Estuary Ramsar Site site; the Suffolk Coast and Heaths Area of Outstanding Natural Beauty (AONB); and the Suffolk Heritage Coast area.

=== Management ===
The Royal Society for the Protection of Birds owns and manages Havergate Island. Active habitat management of the lagoons is employed to benefit the islands breeding and wintering bird populations. Activities include control of water levels and salinity, improving breeding sites, providing increased feeding edges, the creation of deep water refuges for invertebrates and the control of nest predators such as foxes and gulls. Volunteers also help with work on the island including carrying out bird surveying.

=== Threats ===
Due to the low-lying nature of the island, the RSPB recognises that rising sea levels have the great potential to threaten the island in the coming century. Work has been carried out to upgrade the river wall. Long-term plans however accept that the island is likely to be lost and will be allowed to change into salt marsh as part of the strategy of managed retreat. Further plans are in place to create nearby compensatory habitat to replace key habitats in less threatened areas, in particular the expansion of Boyton Marsh.

== Access and facilities ==
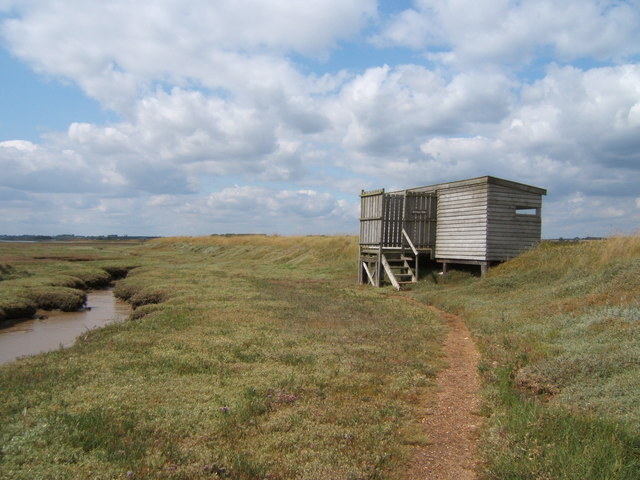
A bird hide at Dove Point on the southern end of the island

Orford Ness, Suffolk, showing locations of main sites.

The island and nature reserve is only accessible by boat from Orford quay and only at certain times and dates. Prior booking is required for access, and group bookings can be made. The RSPB charge a fee to enter the nature reserve, with a reduced fee for members. Havergate Island is near to the Suffolk Coast Path, a long-distance footpath, and to Route 1 of the Sustrans National Cycle Network and bus Route 160 from Ipswich to Orford.

Facilities on the island include a number of bird hides, toilets and a picnic area. Guided tours are also available. The site is unsuitable for wheelchair or pushchair users due to the unimproved nature of its paths and boat access.

== History ==
Havergate Island was first walled for land reclamation around 500 years ago and for much of its history has been used for farming. It was used as arable land and for grazing cattle, and at times for smuggling; the last inhabitants left the island at the end of the 1920s. In the 1930s it was used for summer grazing and in 1933 a gravel company set up shingle extraction on the island but this was found to be unprofitable and they soon left. During World War II the military took control of the island along with Orford Ness. Without human intervention during this time salt water flooded parts of the island making it unsuitable for agricultural use. Havergate Island was formerly an extra-parochial area, in 1868 it became a civil parish and by 1961 the parish was unpopulated. On 1 April 1985 the parish was abolished and merged into Orford.

In 1947 pied avocets were found on the island, as well as at nearby Minsmere, for the first time in the UK since they had become extinct in the country over 100 years before. A number of pairs bred that year on Havergate Island and raised eight chicks between them. Following this discovery the RSPB purchased the island in 1948 and have since managed it for the benefit of birds and the environment.

== See also ==
- Lothingland (An island in Suffolk and Norfolk including parts of Lowestoft and Great Yarmouth)
