= George Lea =

British Army general (1912–1990)

Lieutenant-General Sir George Lea KCB DSO MBE
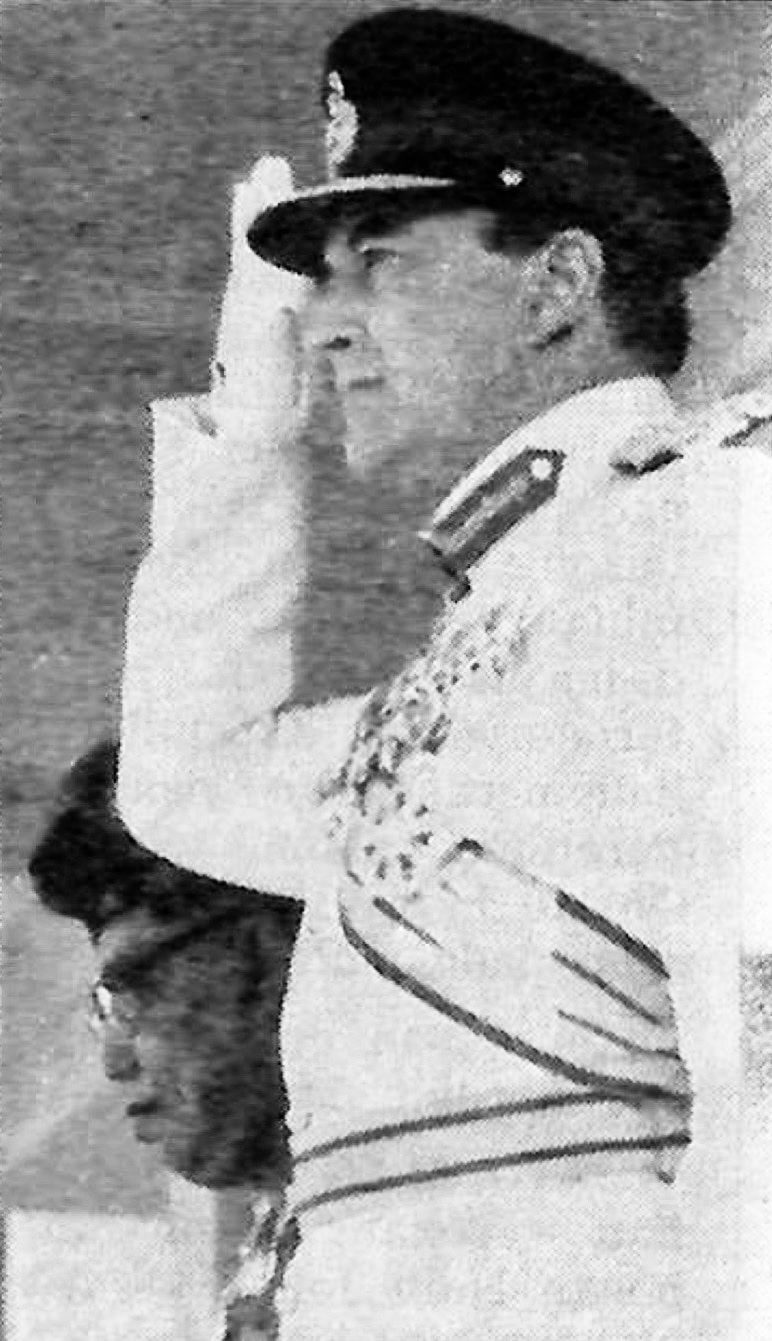
- Major-General Lea, c. 1966
- Born: 28 December 1912; Franche, Worcestershire
- Died: 27 December 1990 (aged 77); Saint Brélade, Jersey
- Military career
- Allegiance: United Kingdom
- Branch: British Army
- Service years: 1925–1965
- Rank: Lieutenant-General
- Service number: 58226
- Units: Lancashire Fusiliers; Parachute Regiment; Royal Regiment of Fusiliers
- Commands: Land Forces Borneo (1966–1967); Northern Rhodesia and Nyasaland Forces (1963–1964); 42nd (Lancashire) Division/District (1962–1963); 2nd Infantry Brigade (1957–1960); Special Air Service (1955–1957); 15th Parachute Battalion (1946); 11th Battalion, Parachute Regiment (1944)
- Conflicts: Second World War; Malayan Emergency; Indonesia–Malaysia confrontation
- Awards: Knight Commander of the Order of the Bath; Distinguished Service Order; Member of the Order of the British Empire; Mentioned in Despatches

Lieutenant-General Sir George Harris Lea, KCB, DSO, MBE (28 December 1912 – 27 December 1990) was a British Army officer who fought in the Second World War, notably at the Battle of Arnhem, and later became Head of the British Defence Staff in Washington, D.C.

== Military career ==
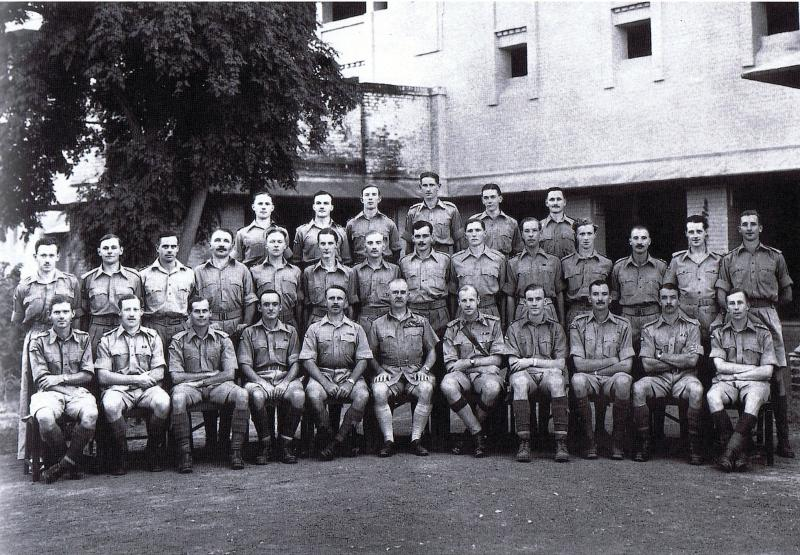
Officers of the 151st Parachute Battalion in India, 1942. Major Lea is sat in the front row, third from the left.

Educated at Charterhouse School and the Royal Military College, Sandhurst, Lea was commissioned into the Lancashire Fusiliers in 1933. He served in the Second World War as brigade major of the 4th Parachute Brigade and then as commanding officer of 11th Battalion, Parachute Regiment. In this role he saw action during Operation Market Garden and became a prisoner of war.

After attending the Staff College, Camberley, Lea became commanding officer of the Special Air Service in 1955 and saw action again in Malaya. He went on to be commander of 2nd Infantry Brigade in 1957, deputy military secretary in 1960 and General Office Commanding 42nd (Lancashire) Division/District of the Territorial Army in 1962. He was given command of the armed forces in Northern Rhodesia and Nyasaland in 1963 and became director of operations in Borneo in the spring of 1965, just before a pivotal battle with Indonesia at Plaman Mapu during the Indonesia-Malaysia confrontation. His last appointment was as head of the British Defence Staff in Washington, D.C. in 1967 before retiring in 1970.

In retirement Lea was Lieutenant of the Tower of London.

Military offices
Preceded by Claude Dunbar	GOC 42nd (Lancashire) Division/District; 1962–1963	Succeeded by Noel Thomas
Preceded by Sir Nigel Henderson	Head of the British Defence Staff in Washington, D.C. 1968–1970	Succeeded by Sir John Lapsley
Honorary titles
Preceded by Kenneth Darling	Colonel of the Royal Regiment of Fusiliers; 1974–1977	Succeeded by Alexander James Wilson
