= Simpson's Saltings =

Nature reserve in Suffolk, England

Coordinates: 52.055°N 1.474°E

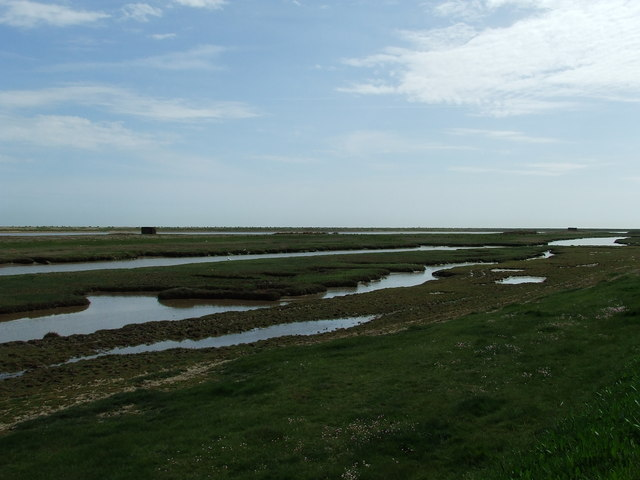
- Interactive map of Simpson's Saltings
- Type: Nature reserve
- Location: Hollesley, Suffolk
- OS grid: TM383453
- Area: 25 hectares (62 acres)
- Manager: Suffolk Wildlife Trust

Simpson's Saltings is a 25 hectare nature reserve on the Suffolk coast east of Hollesley. It is managed by the Suffolk Wildlife Trust. It is in the Suffolk Coast and Heaths Area of Outstanding Natural Beauty, and part of the Alde-Ore Estuary Site of Special Scientific Interest, Ramsar internationally important wetland site, Special Area of Conservation, Special Protection Area under the European Union Directive on the Conservation of Wild Birds, and Grade I Nature Conservation Review site,

The Saltings are described by the Trust as "one of the country’s most important coastal sites for its wealth of uncommon coastal and saltmarsh plants." There are also rare lichens. Habitats include intertidal mud, estuary creeks, saltmarsh, compacted sand and shingle.

There is no public access but the site can be viewed from the sea wall.
