= Alde Mudflats =

Nature reserve in Suffolk, England

Coordinates: 52.152°N 1.505°E

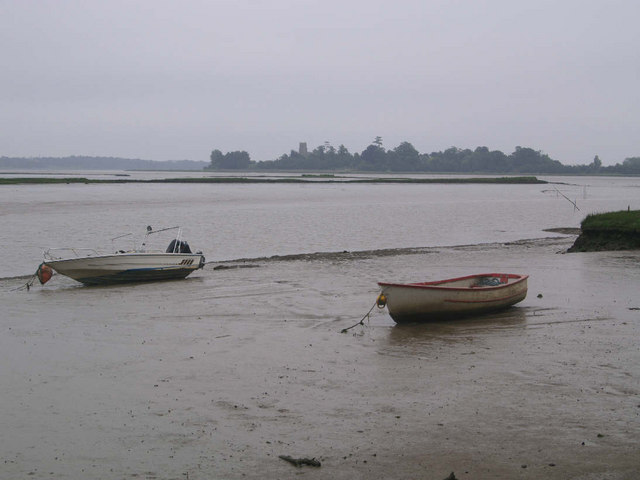
- Interactive map of Alde Mudflats
- Type: Nature reserve
- Location: Iken, Suffolk
- OS grid: TM399562
- Area: 22 hectares (54 acres)
- Manager: Suffolk Wildlife Trust

Alde Mudflats is a 22 hectare nature reserve west of Iken in Suffolk. It is owned by the Crown Estate and managed by the Suffolk Wildlife Trust. It is in the Suffolk Coast and Heaths Area of Outstanding Natural Beauty, and part of the Alde-Ore Estuary Site of Special Scientific Interest, Ramsar internationally important wetland site, Special Area of Conservation, Special Protection Area under the European Union Directive on the Conservation of Wild Birds, and Grade I Nature Conservation Review site,

This three mile long stretch of inter-tidal mud and saltmarsh supports internationally important numbers of avocets, and other birds include black-tailed godwits, oystercatchers, marsh harriers, pintails, wigeons and grey plovers.

There is no public access to the site.
