= Rockhall Wood Pit, Sutton =

Protected area in Suffolk, England

Coordinates: 52.046°N 1.358°E

- Site of Special Scientific Interest
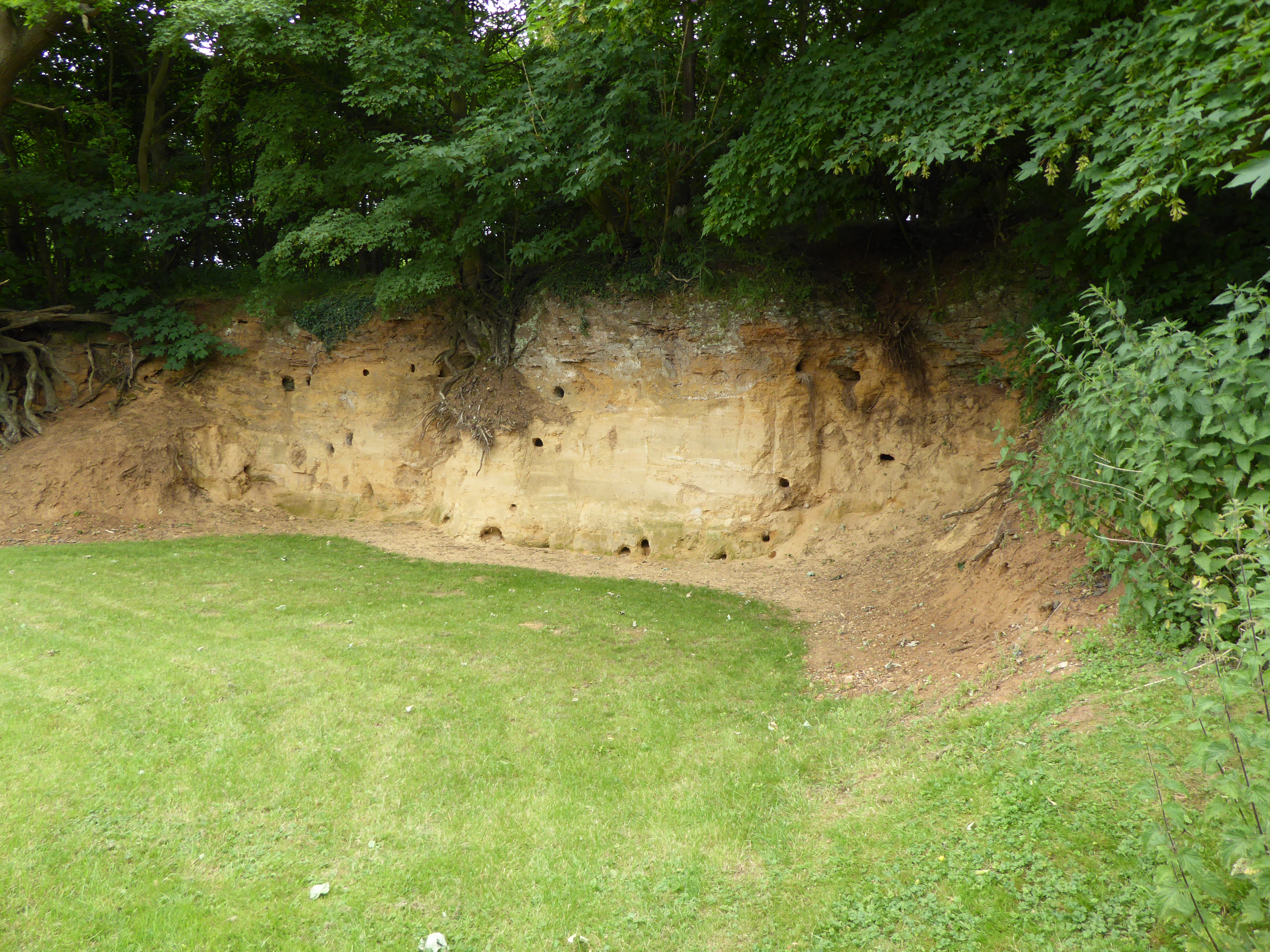
- Location of Rockhall Wood Pit, Sutton.
- Area of search: Suffolk
- Grid reference: TM 304 439
- Interest: Geological
- Area: 5.3 hectares
- Notification date: 1986
- Location map: Magic Map

Rockhall Wood Pit, Sutton is a 5.3-hectare (13-acre) geological Site of Special Scientific Interest west of Shottisham in Suffolk. It is a Geological Conservation Review site both for its quaternary and neogene deposits.

This site has excellent exposures of the Pliocene Coralline Crag Formation, with a vertical sequence of diagenetic changes and rich fossil fauna. It is described by Natural England as probably the most important Pliocene site in Britain.

This site is private land, but part has been converted by Geo Suffolk into a 'Pliocene Forest', with trees similar to ones which would have grown in Suffolk four million years ago.
