= Shingle Street =

Settlement in Suffolk, England

Coordinates: 52.032°N 1.45°E

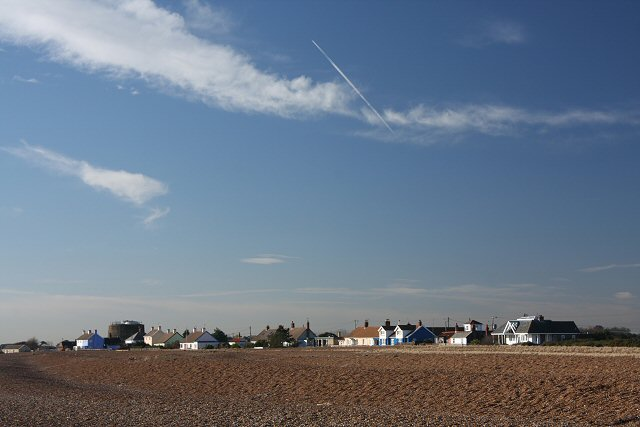
- Shingle Street in January 2008.

- Location within Suffolk
- Civil parish: Bawdsey
- District: East Suffolk
- Shire county: Suffolk
- Region: East
- Country: England
- Sovereign state: United Kingdom
- Post town: WOODBRIDGE
- Postcode district: IP12
- Police: Suffolk
- Fire: Suffolk
- Ambulance: East of England
- UK Parliament: Suffolk Coastal

Map of Shingle Street and Orford Ness, Suffolk.

Shingle Street is a coastal settlement on the North Sea coast of the English county of Suffolk. It is 8 miles (13 km) north-east of Felixstowe and 12 miles (19 km) east of Ipswich at the mouth of the River Ore and opposite the tip of Orford Ness. It is within the parish of Bawdsey, with HM Young Offender Institution Hollesley Bay Colony nearby. A report from October 2004 suggests that Shingle Street is at risk from coastal erosion and flooding and could disappear within 20 years if sea defences are not erected.

== History ==
Shingle Street was originally a home for fishermen and river pilots for the River Ore. Early in the 19th century a Martello tower was built, which was later a home for coastguards. Many of the original buildings date from this period. A public house called the Old Beach House had been built here out of drift wood. Richard Cobbold mentions that in 1797 this public house was being kept by Jacob Merrells, who was also a pilot. However, in 1810 this was replaced by a pre-fabricated wooden building, built in Ipswich in the yard of the Cliff Brewery. It was then brought to Shingle Street by barge and named the Lifeboat Inn. The pub was one of 300 pubs owned by Cobbolds Brewery and was pictured in Souvenir of the Bi-Centenery of the Cliff Brewery in Ipswich.

=== World War II ===
Several buildings were destroyed during World War II, including the Lifeboat Inn.

After World War II many strange happenings were reported to have taken place at Shingle Street, including a failed German invasion. Since the civilian population had been evacuated in May 1940, there were no eyewitness reports, although official documents remained classified until questions in the House of Commons led to their early release in 1993. These papers disclosed no German landing. Rumours of a failed invasion on the South and East Coasts were commonplace in September 1940 and helped to boost morale. Author James Hayward has proposed that these rumours, which were widely reported in the American press, were a successful example of black propaganda with an aim of ensuring American co-operation and securing lend lease resources by showing that the United Kingdom was capable of successfully resisting the German Army.

==== Film ====
In 2025 the documentary Fire Over Shingle Street (directed by Tim Curtis) premiered in Suffolk cinemas, exploring one of Britain's most mysterious wartime legends. Backed by decades of research from author, James Hayward and former lecturer, Ron Clayton, the film examines rumours of a foiled German invasion, burning seas, and bodies on the beach. It also features former East Anglian Daily Times reporter Henry Creagh, who recounts a 1992 call from a source claiming to have seen secret MOD files describing a deadly friendly fire incident. At post-screening Q&As in Woodbridge and Aldeburgh, over half of both audiences indicated that they believed something unexplained had occurred at Shingle Street during WWII.

== Shingle Street in culture ==
Shingle Street was the inspiration of the Thomas Dolby song "Cloudburst at Shingle Street", from the 1982 album The Golden Age of Wireless. Shingle Street and its Martello Tower are settings of Neil Spring's 2020 novel "The Haunted Shore".

=== The Shingle Street Shell Line ===
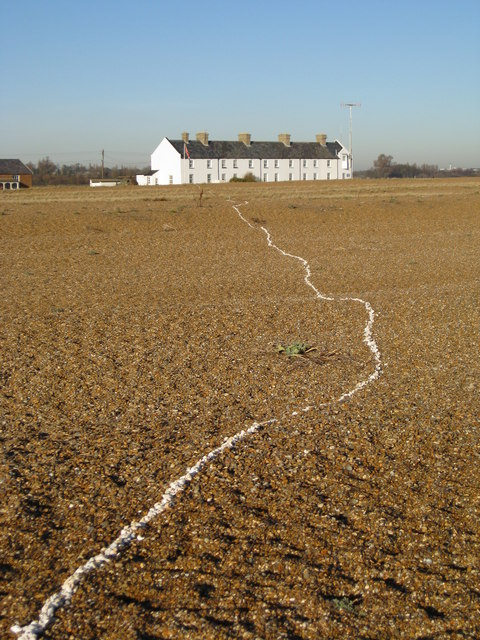
The Shingle Street Shell Line

In 2005 stonecutter Lida Cardozo Kindersley and her childhood friend Els Bottema started to arrange a line of shells on the beach, beginning as a way of coping with their shared experience of cancer treatment. After regular visits to add to the line by 2018 it stretched for more than 275m and was made up of 20,000 individual whelk shells. A short documentary film about the work, entitled 'C shells', was released in 2017, followed by a book The Shingle Street Shell Line in 2018.

=== Flora ===
Shingle Street has Verbascum thapsus.

Views of Shingle Street

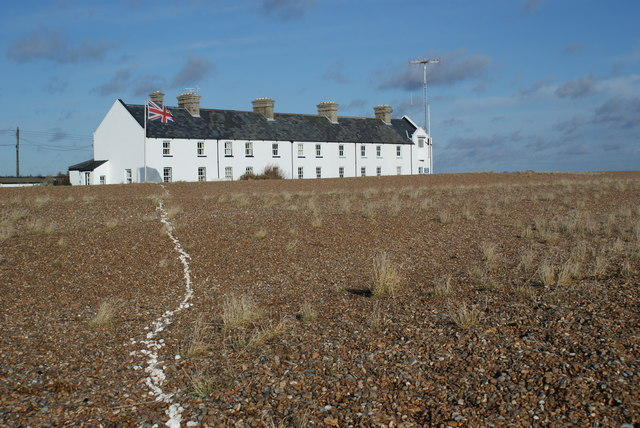
Coastguard cottages, Shingle Street

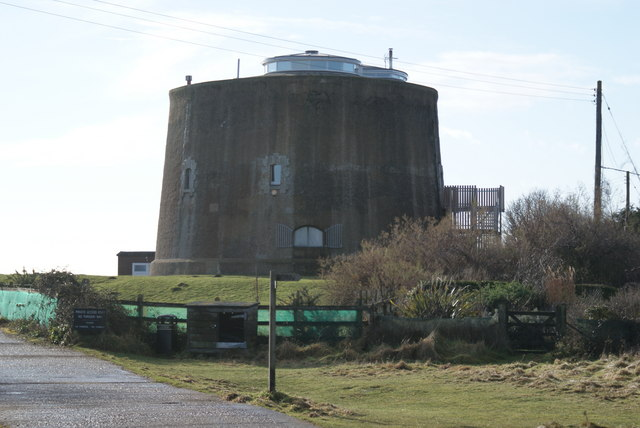
The Martello tower

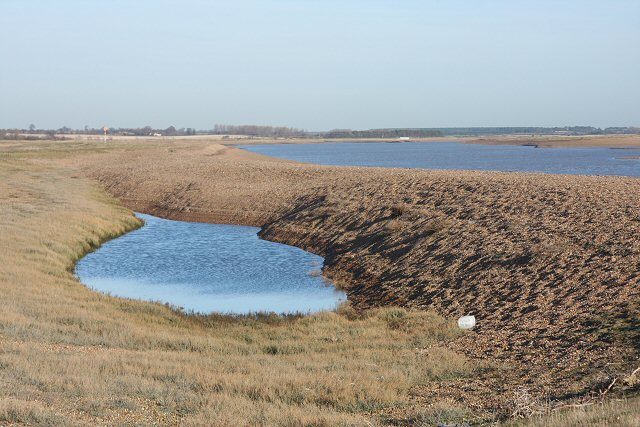
Percolation lagoon at Shingle Street
