= Butley River =

River in Suffolk, England

Butley
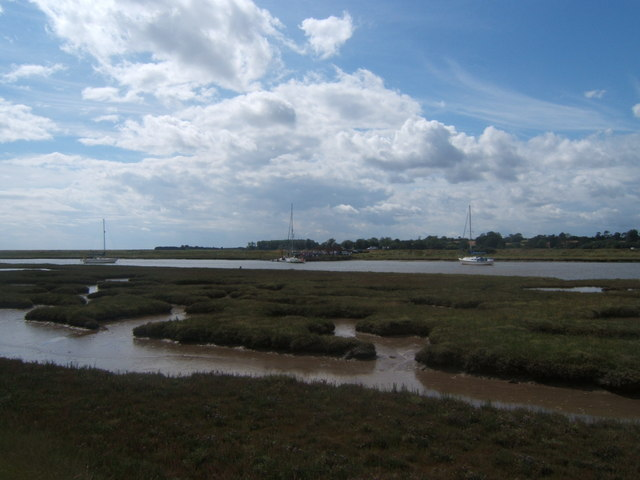
- Butley River at Boyton Dock

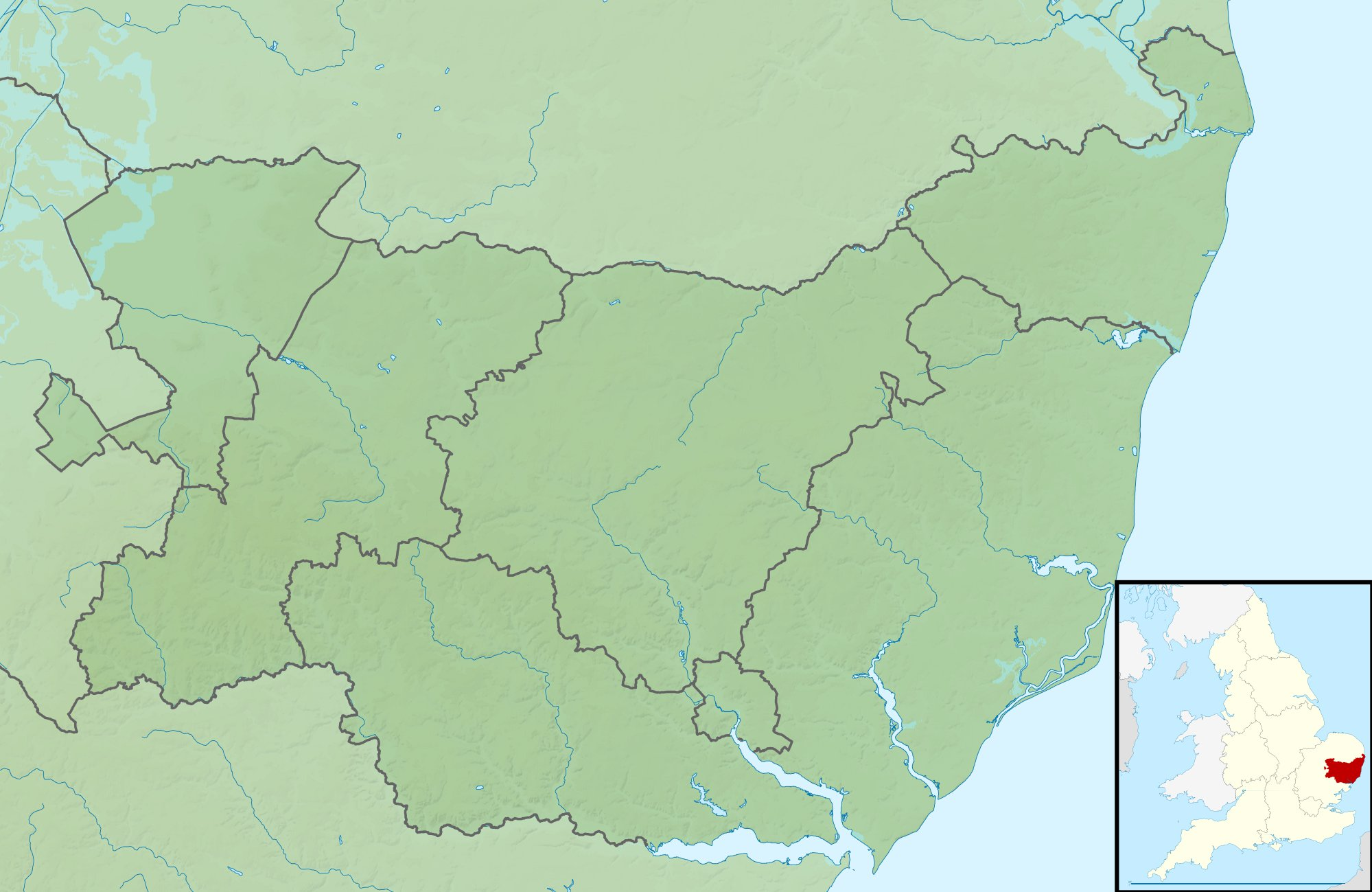
- Location within Suffolk

Location
- Country: England
- Region: Suffolk

Physical characteristics
- Source: Rendlesham Forest
  - coordinates: 52.110°N 1.410°E
  - elevation: 13 m (43 ft)
- Mouth: River Ore near Boyton Marshes
  - coordinates: 52.0708°N 1.5025°E
  - elevation: 0 m (0 ft)
- Length: 12.2 km (7.6 mi)

Basin features
- River system: River Ore

The Butley River or Butley Creek is a tributary of the River Ore in the English county of Suffolk. The river has its source in the Rendlesham Forest area to the east of Eyke.

The river is tidal from its confluence with the Ore at Boyton as far inland as Butley Mills and almost to the village of Chillesford. A water mill was first recorded at Butley Mills in 1530. The river was also used for the transport of goods but by 1948 had become too silted to allow either use.

The river is located within the Suffolk Coast and Heaths Area of Outstanding Natural Beauty. An RSPB reserve, Boyton Marshes, is situated at the mouth of the river on an area of salt marsh. A registered charity, the Alde & Ore Association, exists to "preserve and protect for the public benefit the Alde, Ore and Butley Creek rivers and their banks from Shingle Street to their tidal limits".

The river is crossed by the Butley Ferry during the summer period. This provides a link between Orford and Boyton and Butley for pedestrians and cyclists along the Suffolk Coast Path.

== See also ==
- Butley Ferry
- River Ore
- Orford Ness
