= Boyton, Suffolk =

Village in Suffolk, England

Coordinates: 52.075°N 1.464°E

Boyton
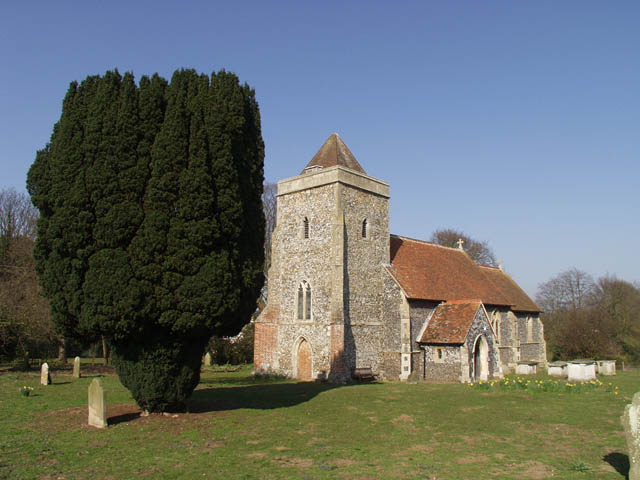
- St. Andrew's, the parish church of Boyton

- Location within Suffolk
- Interactive map of Boyton
- Area: 6.19 km^{2} (2.39 sq mi)
- Population: 147 (2011)
  - Density: 24/km^{2} (62/sq mi)
- District: East Suffolk
- Shire county: Suffolk
- Region: East
- Country: England
- Sovereign state: United Kingdom
- Post town: Woodbridge
- Postcode district: IP12
- UK Parliament: Suffolk Coastal

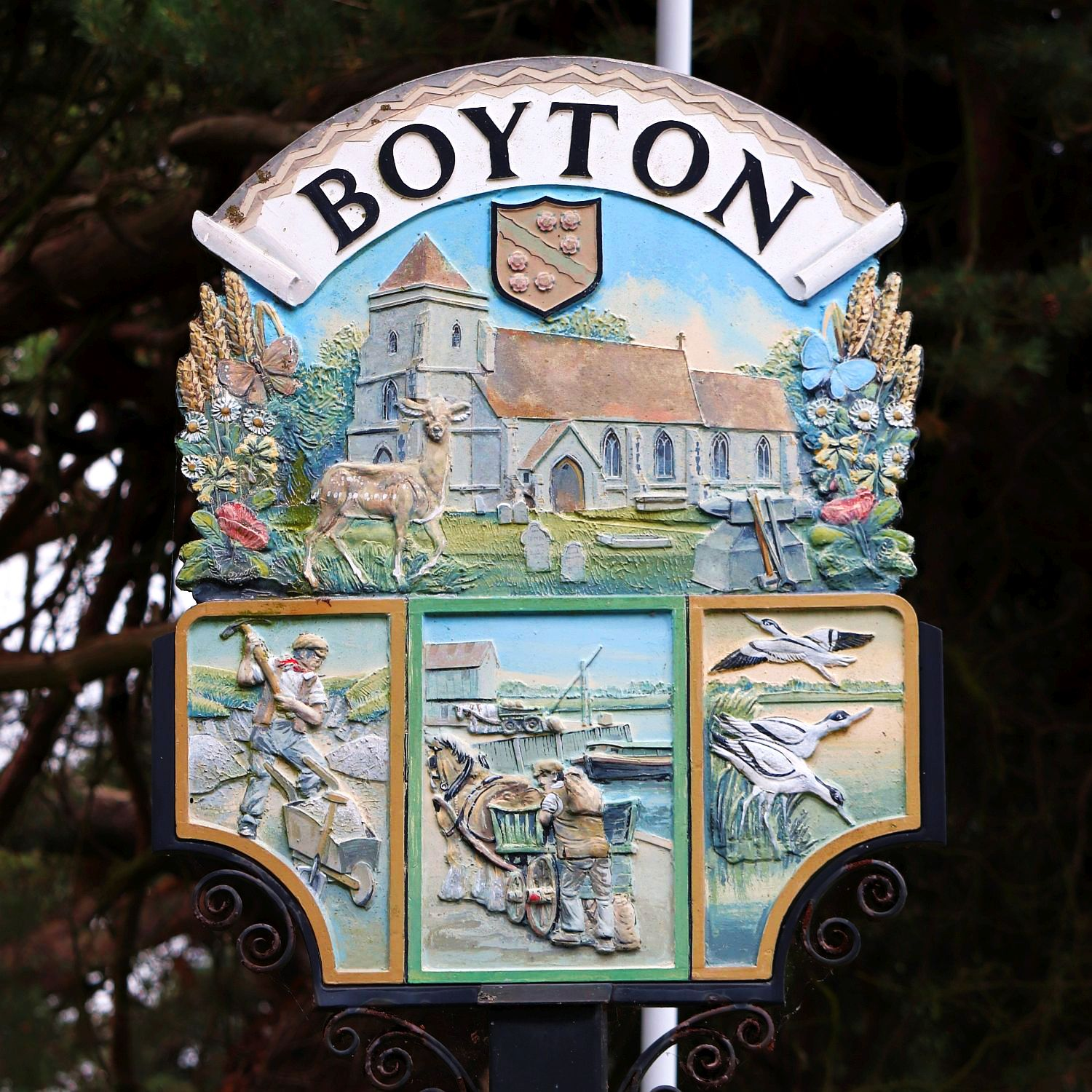
Boyton Village Sign

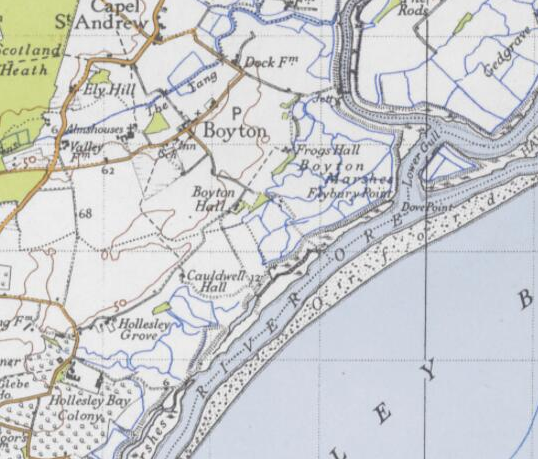
An Ordnance Survey map of the Parish of Boyton from the 20th Century

Boyton is a village and civil parish in the East Suffolk district of Suffolk, England, about eight miles east of Woodbridge, and close to Orford Ness. Boyton is a small village in South East England and is part of the heritage coast. In the Domesday Book of 1086 Boyton was recorded under the name "Bohtuna". The village has a number of facilities within the surrounding area, for instance Hollesley primary school, a village primary school for children aged 4–11 years. Boyton village hall is becoming a focus for new village activities, and HM Prison Hollesley Bay is also located not far from the village centre. In the 1870s Boyton was described by John Marius Wilson as:

"a parish in Woodbridge district, Suffolk; on the river Alde, near Hollesley bay, 4 miles WSW of Orford, and 7 SE of Melton r. station."

According to statistics from the 2011 census, Boyton had a population of 147. The village name 'Boyton' can be translated to "farmstead of the boys or servants".

== Land use ==
Boyton covers a total of 6648 km^{2} of land, the bulk of that land (6225 km^{2} ) is made up of what is named green space (otherwise known as Open space reserve); described as "an open piece of land that is undeveloped (has no buildings or other built structures) and is accessible to the public, which is usually partly or completely covered with grass, trees, shrubs, or other vegetation". According to data from the Office Of National statistics, 12.5 km^{2} of boytons land area is covered by domestic buildings (which include any building type which serves as a home e.g. Houses, flats or Hotels), because not a great amount of Boytons land area is covered by domestic buildings, it can be deducted that the Parish has a low population density (according to the office of National statistics, Boyton's population density in the year 2011 was measured at 0.2 persons per hectare). Boyton also uses 19 km^{2} of land for road usage, a large proportion of which is accountable to Boyton Road (leading to Church Road), the main road running through the Parish linking it to larger villages such as Hollesley to the South West.

== History ==
As long as 8000 years ago groups of hunters would come to Boyton in order to take advantage of the marshlands which were full of fish and wild fowl which the hunters would catch with nets, hooks and flint-tipped weapons. Copious amounts of evidence exist as proof of continuous settlement in the town of Boyton throughout history, for instance a "Bronze Age gold torque was found in Boyton and a replica can be seen in the Ipswich Museum - the original is with the British Museum". However, little is known about Boyton's usage throughout the Dark Ages and thereon after until the 16th Century, however, because the Parish is located on the suffolk coast (which was "on the sea route from Jutland and Saxony") it is possible that Boyton may have been one of the first settlements for immigrants arriving into the country. It was also discovered that the North East section of Boyton "had an important Anglo Saxon settlement and has been excavated by the Butley Excavation Group with students from London University and local volunteers.".

Boyton's usage remained for that of agricultural and fishing purposes, and these honest trades kept the small Parish reasonably self-sufficient until the late 18th century. Smuggling became a common occurrence to Boyton and the rest of the Suffolk coast, it was reported that local people who had previously remained within the honest agricultural trade "were recruited by the notorious Captain Bargood who had cottages at Hollesley and Butley".

After World War I, the agriculture market within Boyton began to decline, and as a result trustees began to sell off their land, including the three farms "Valley farm, Dock farm and Laurel farm ". This slump in demand for agriculture was to be revitalised upon the beginning of World War II, when the production of home grown food regained its importance due to the newfound struggle of importing foods both across countries and across the UK itself. "During World War 2 the Boyton area was a tank range, and the remains of a military building are still visible today"

The 1970s and 1980s brought the production of a small number of detached properties in an attempt to regain a "community spirit" despite the fact that the village shop and post office had now closed. Other than this "the recent acquisition of 175 acres of Boyton Marsh (including the fine old Banter's Barn and Boyton Dock) by the Royal Society for the Protection of Birds will benefit not only wildlife and the visitors who come to enjoy it, but the village too "

== Occupational structure in 1881 ==
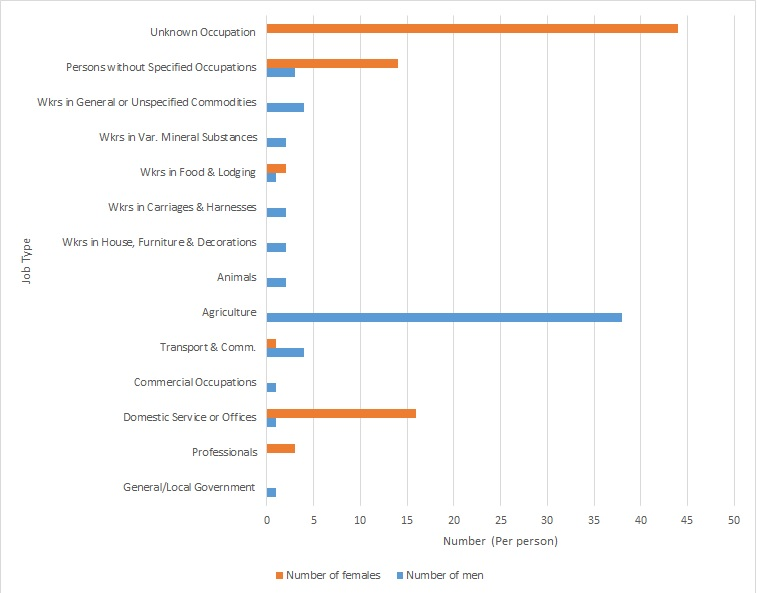
A bar graph showing male and female occupation statistics for the Civil Parish of Boyton in 1881.

A bar graph can be seen on this page depicting the comparison between male and Female occupation statistics for Boyton in the year of 1881. One of the most recognisable features of the graph is the high proportion of females (44 specifically) that come under the 'unknown occupation' section. Reason for this may be that during the Victorian Era "women’s work was not always accurately recorded within sources that historians rely on, due to much of women's work having been irregular, home-based or within a family-run business.". One other noticeable aspect of the occupational structure of Boyton in 1881 is the large proportion of males who worked in the agriculture sector, of the 61 males accounted for in the 1881 occupation Census for Boyton, 38 worked in agriculture. This may have been an issue for the Parish of Boyton in the late 19th century due to the occurrence of the agricultural depression (most probably linked to what is known as the long depression), with such a large proportion of Boyton's male population relying on agriculture, the "series of wet summers, culminating in the wettest season in living memory in 1879 meant an alarmingly low yield in successive harvests". This downfall in crop yields and the resulting collapse in the agriculture sector may be accountable for the fall in Boyton's population towards the end of the 19th century (as visible in the population graph seen on the right hand side of this page).

== Population ==
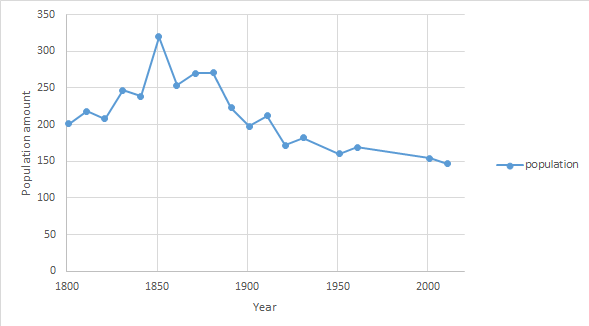
Total population of Boyton Civil Parish, Suffolk, as reported by the census of population from 1801 to 2011

The graph to the left shows the population of the parish of Boyton from its first population recording in 1801 through to census data from 2011. Boyton's population was first recorded as a total of 201 in 1801; since then the highest population level the parish has reached was that of 1851 when it was recorded that 320 people lived in the village. In comparison, Boyton's population was at its lowest recorded level in 2011 with a total of 147 inhabitants. The reason for this may be the decrease in size of the agricultural sector; throughout the 19th century, Boyton had a flourishing agricultural industry, with large local farms such as Boyton farm and Dock farm, and because "during the 19th century working-class children were often employed in factories and on farms" the population may have risen due to people requiring children to work the lands. However recent recordings of Boyton's population show the change the parish has undergone, with the lowest population recording in 2011 (and 112 of the 147 residents of Boyton were aged 45 or over). 35.3% of the residents are retired, with only 21% in full-time employment, with as many people working in Public administration and defence as in Agriculture, forestry and fishing. This modernization of the job sectors has possibly meant that a large proportion of the young population has migrated to more prosperous areas with greater opportunities for employment, such as the opportunities presented in central London.
