= Orford, Suffolk =

Village in Suffolk, England

Coordinates: 52.095°N 1.534°E

Orford
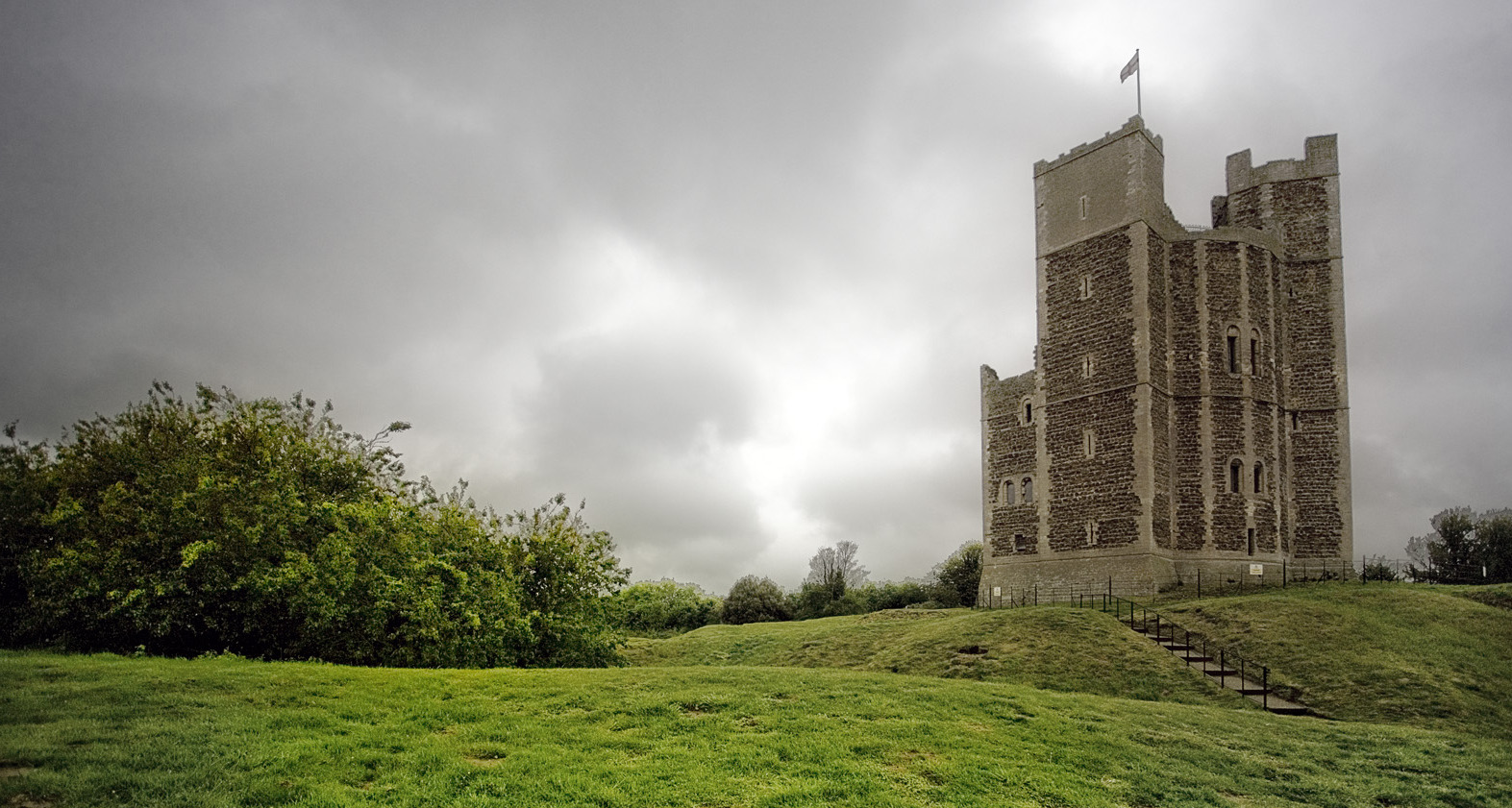
- Orford Castle

- Location within Suffolk
- Population: 713 (2011 Census)
- OS grid reference: TM422499
- Civil parish: Orford
- District: East Suffolk
- Shire county: Suffolk
- Region: East
- Country: England
- Sovereign state: United Kingdom
- Post town: WOODBRIDGE
- Postcode district: IP12
- Dialling code: 01394
- Police: Suffolk
- Fire: Suffolk
- Ambulance: East of England
- UK Parliament: Suffolk Coastal

Orford is a village and civil parish in the East Suffolk district, in Suffolk, England, within the Suffolk Coast and Heaths Area of Outstanding Natural Beauty. It is 9 miles (14 km) east of Woodbridge. In 2011 the parish had a population of 713.

== Geography ==
Orford is sited on the landward side of the estuary of the River Ore, which at this point lies inland of Orford Ness. In historic times, the river met the sea very close to Orford, but today the mouth of the Ore lies some 5 kilometres (3.1 mi) southwest of Orford, near Shingle Street.

== History ==
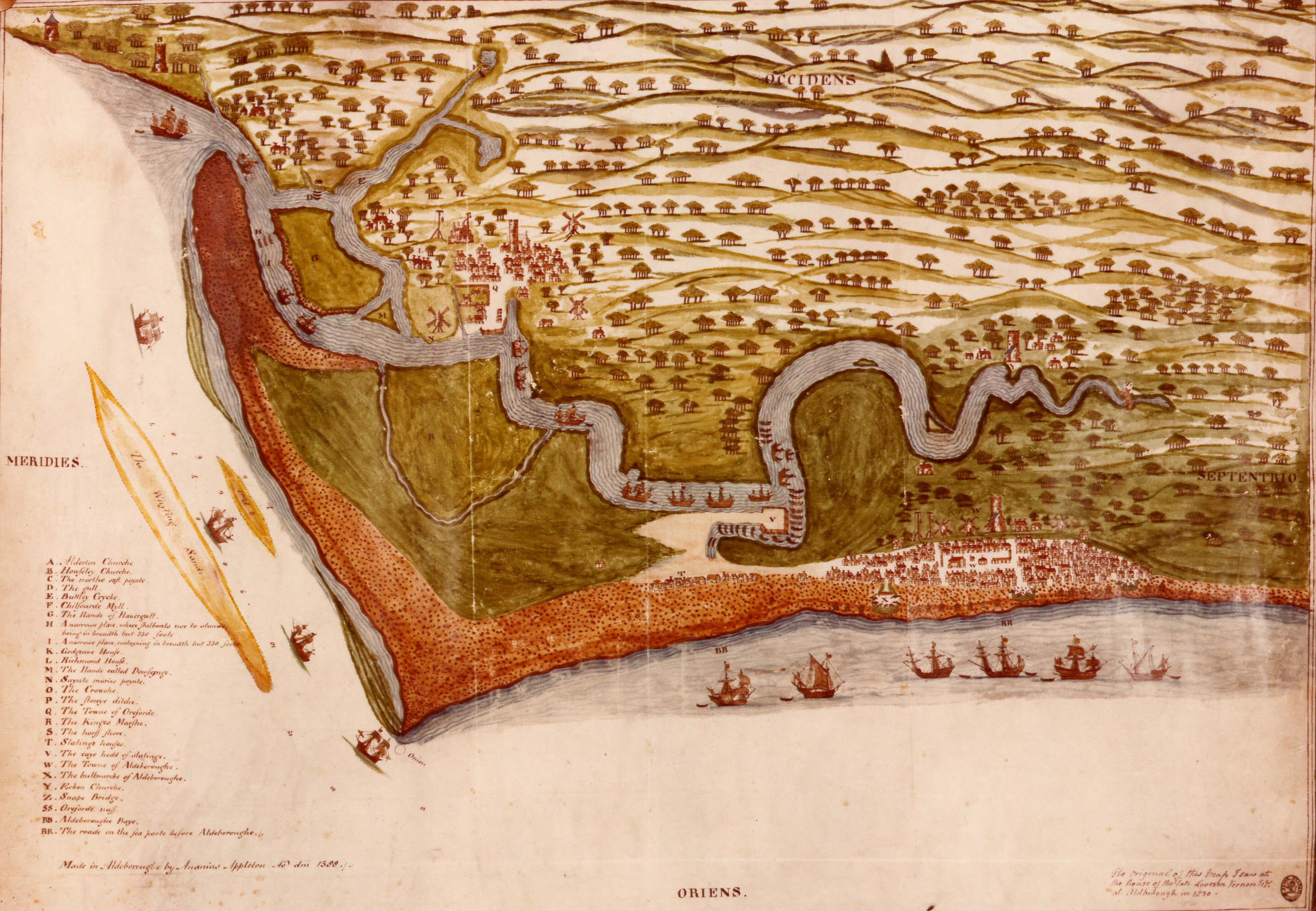
Orford is the centre-left settlement depicted in this 1588 map

The name Orford is probably derived from the Old English ōraford meaning 'ford by the shore'.

Like many Suffolk coastal villages it was of some importance as a port and fishing village in the Middle Ages. It has a mediaeval castle, built to dominate the River Ore and St Bartholomew's Church is Grade I listed. The castle was built as a royal castle built by Henry II in the period 1165-1173 as an assertion of monarchical power in the region. Although the castle became less important after the king's death in 1189, the importance of Orford as a port grew. By 1200 its level of trade exceeded that of nearby Ipswich. Henry III granted Orford its first charter and the town returned a member of parliament in 1298, although it did not function as a constituency throughout the 14th century. Orford Town Hall was completed in 1902.

== Local amenities ==
The population of Orford greatly increases during the summer months, partly due to its flourishing sailing club. In common with other Suffolk coastal towns and villages, a substantial number of properties in Orford are holiday or second homes.

As well as the Castle, Orford's attractions include river cruises, three pubs, a renowned traditional bakery, a smokehouse and a restaurant; the Butley-Orford Oysterage.

Orford was rated as among the "20 most beautiful villages in the UK and Ireland" by Condé Nast Traveler in 2020 and its castle as "worthy of a storybook".

== Governance ==
Historically Orford was an ancient borough institutionalised as Orford Corporation. It returned two members of parliament for the Orford constituency from 1523 to 1832. Considered a rotten borough, this status was revoked by the Municipal Corporations Act 1883.

Orford is part of the electoral ward of Orford and Tunstall. The population of the ward at the 2011 census was 1,830.

== Notable people ==
- John Kirby (1690–1753), topographer, was also schoolmaster in Orford.

== Gallery ==
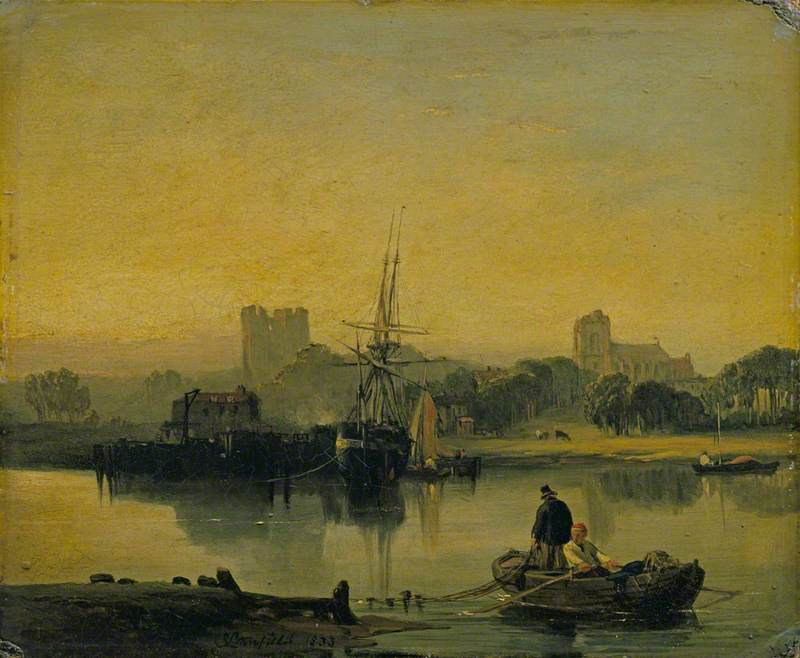
Orford by Clarkson Stanfield, 1833

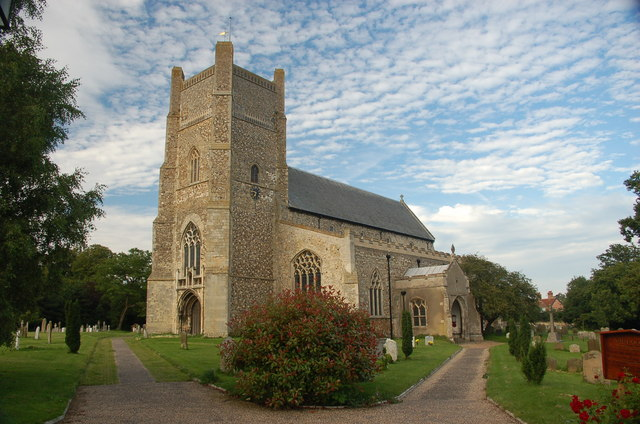
St Bartholomew's Church

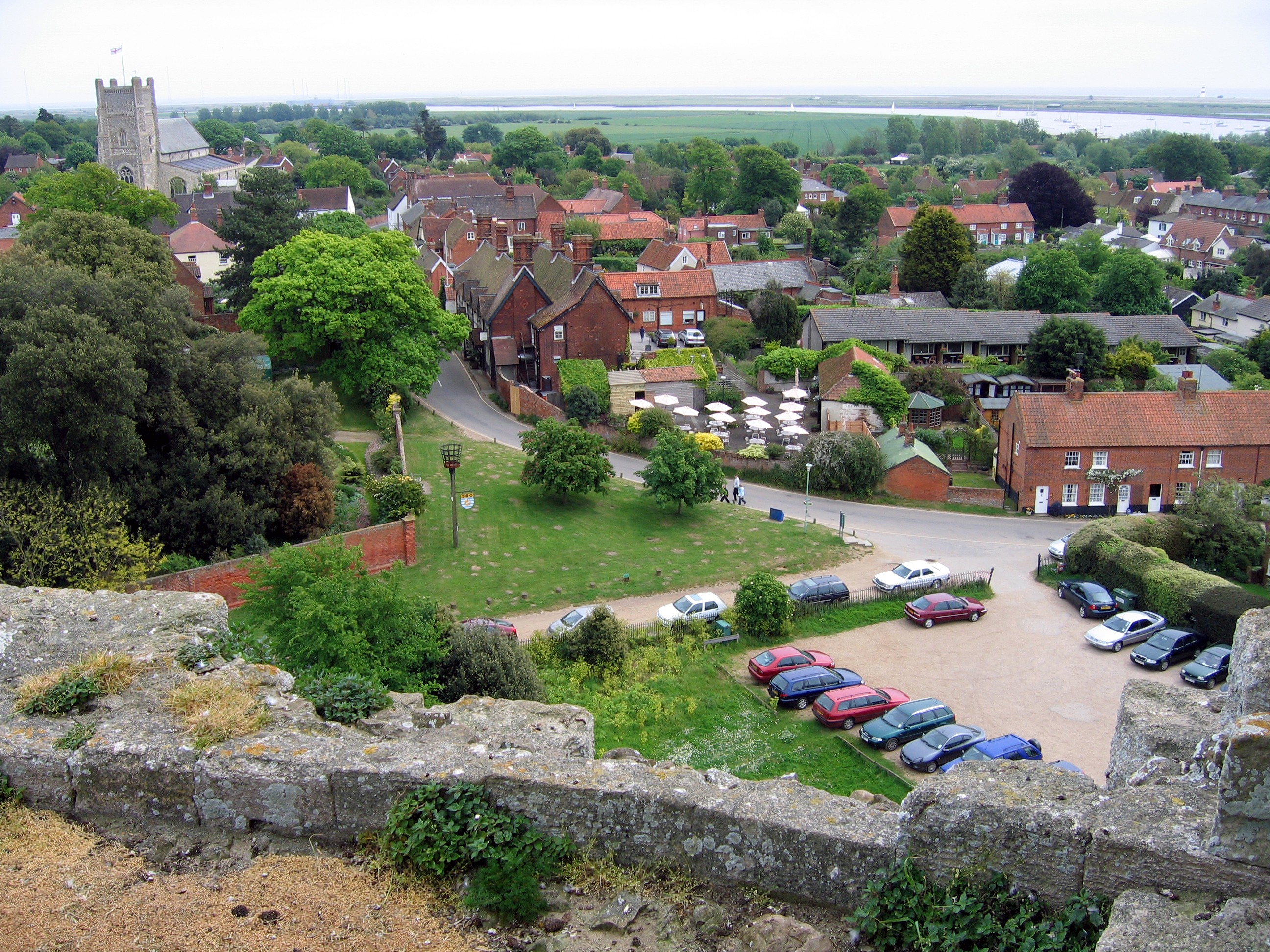
View from the top of Orford Castle

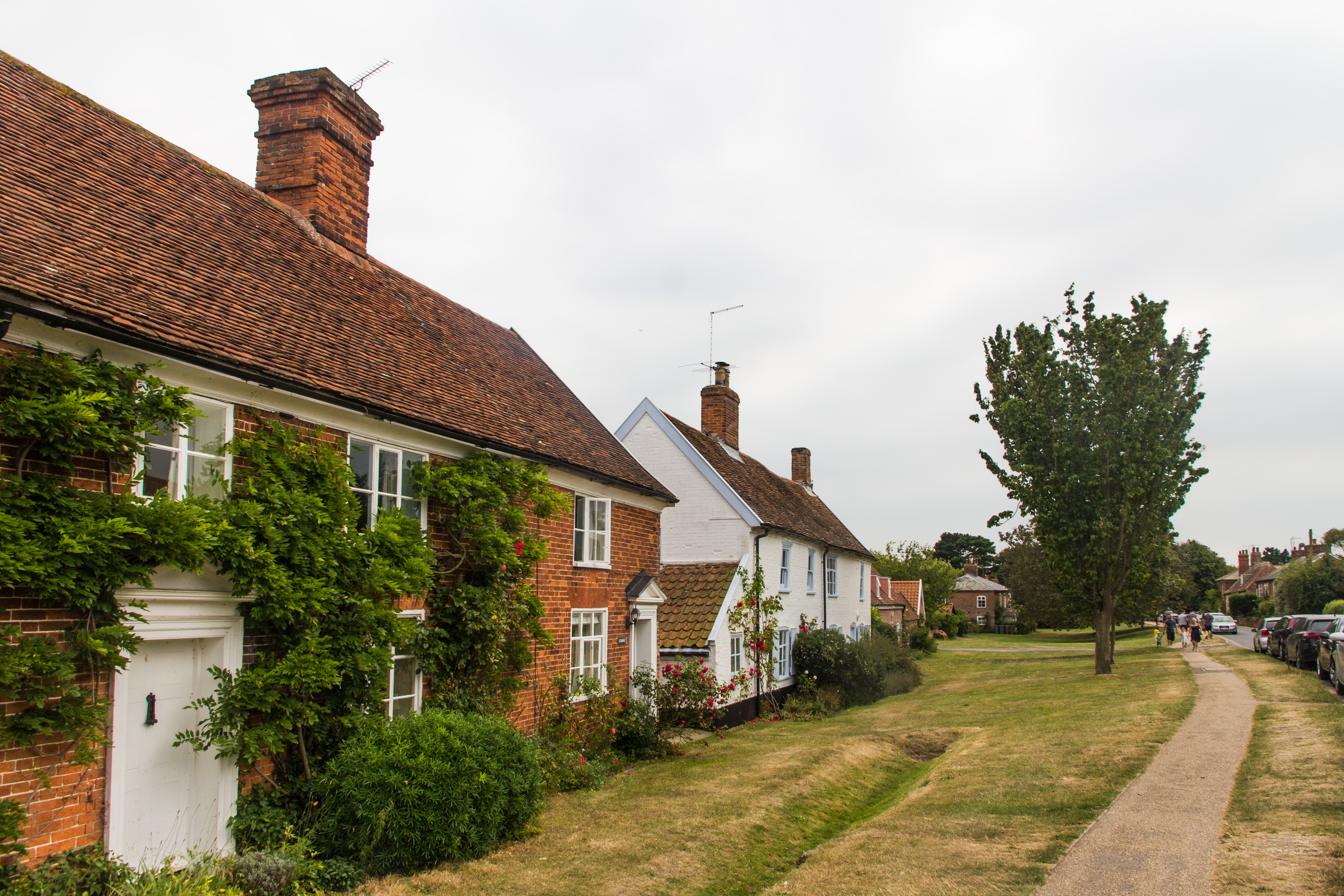
Houses in the town

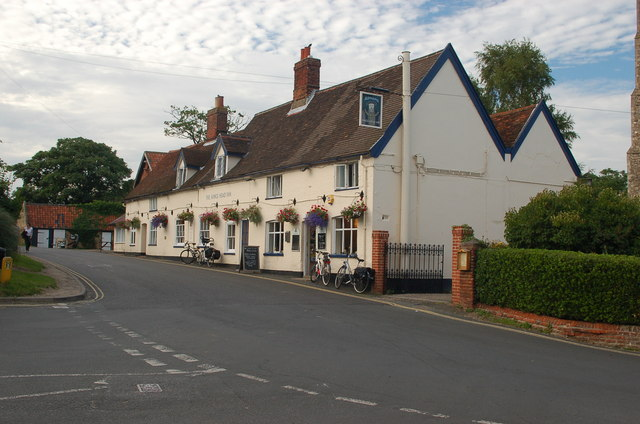
The Kings Head pub

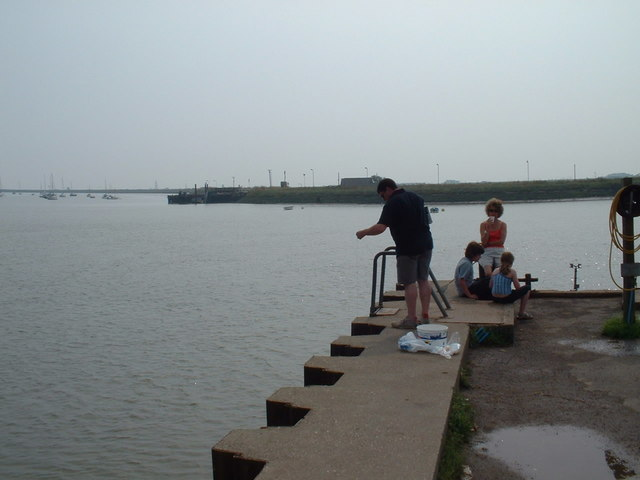
Orford Quay

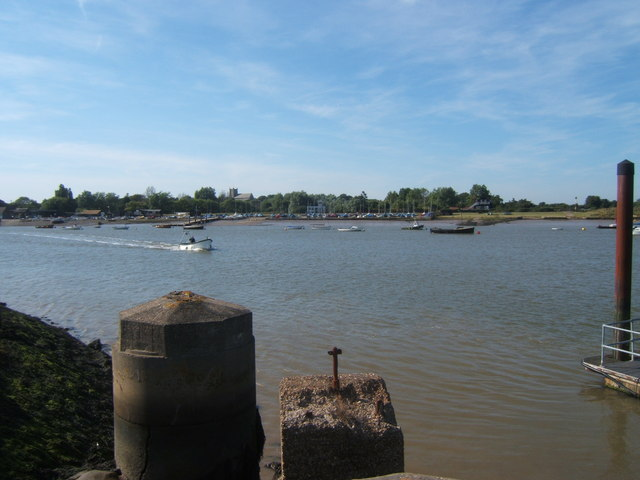
Orford Quay from Orford Ness

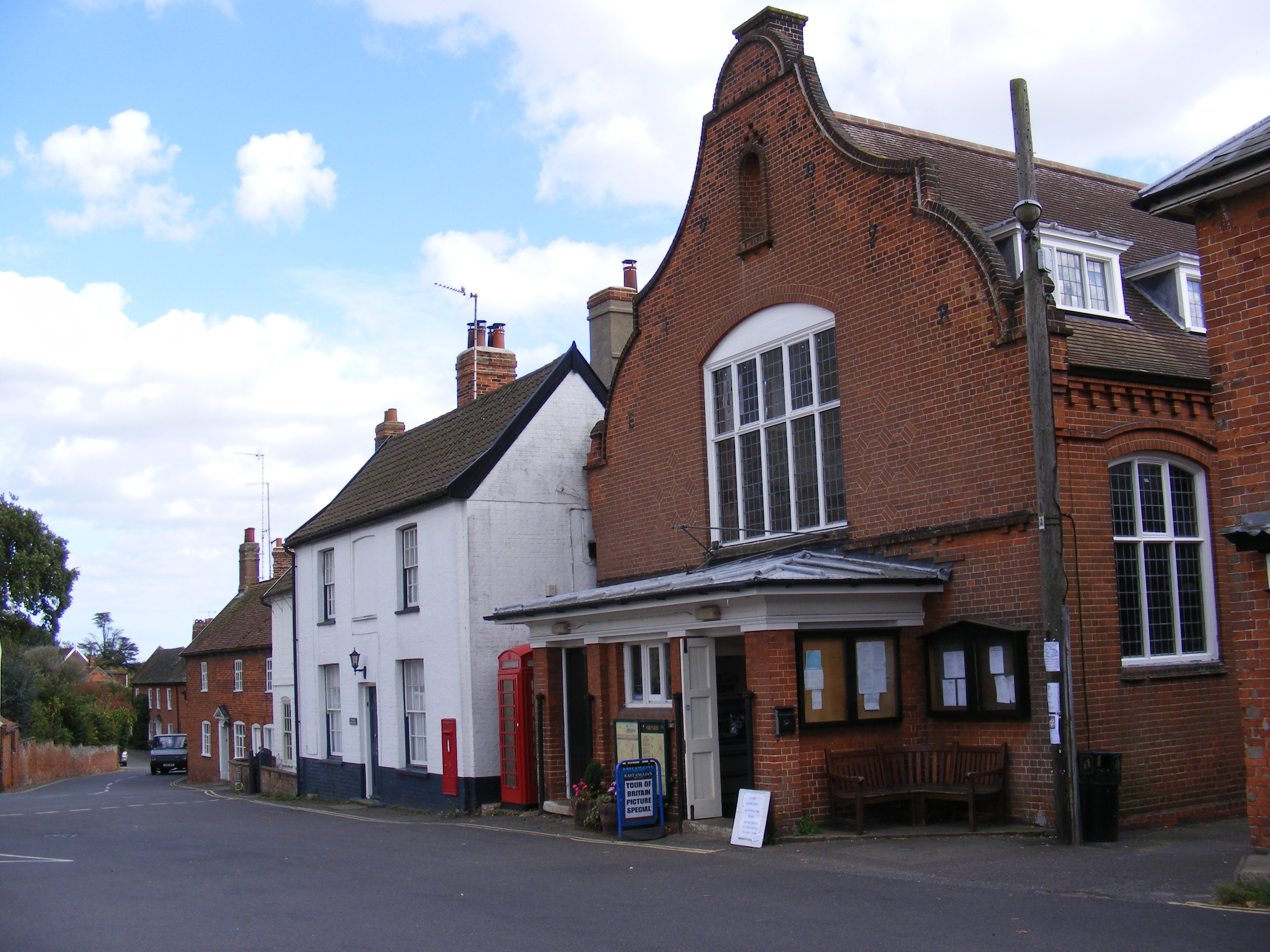
Orford Town Hall (on the right)

== See also ==
- Orford (UK Parliament constituency)
