= Orford Ness =

Coastal shingle spit in Suffolk, England

- Near Orford, Suffolk
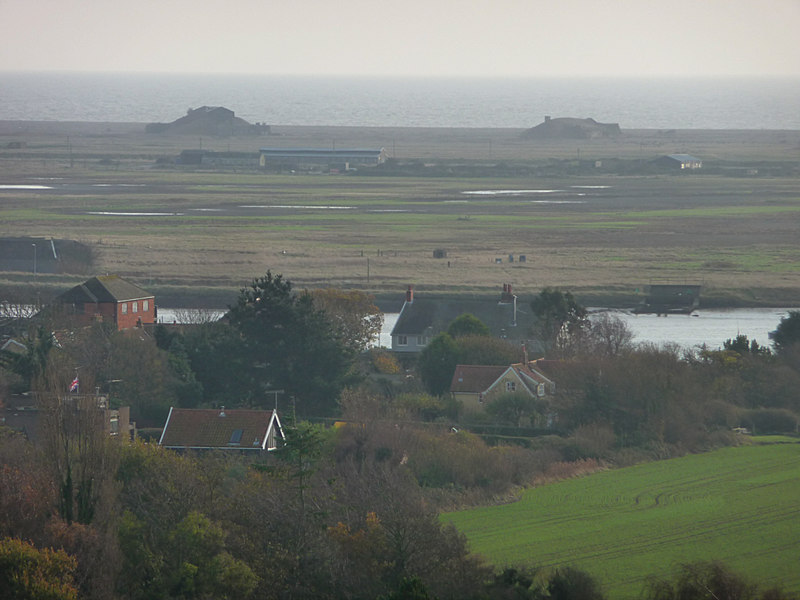
- Looking towards Orford Ness from Orford castle

Site information
- Type: National Nature Reserve, Site of Special Scientific Interest, internationally important site for nature conservation, former military test site
- Operator: Ministry of Defence, Atomic Weapons Research Establishment, National Trust for Places of Historic Interest or Natural Beauty
- Status: Inactive

Location
- Shown in Suffolk
- Location within Suffolk
- Coordinates: 52°04′53″N 01°33′31″E

Site history
- In use: 1913 – early 1983

Orford Ness is a cuspate foreland shingle spit on the Suffolk coast in Great Britain, linked to the mainland at Aldeburgh and stretching along the coast to Orford and down to North Weir Point, opposite Shingle Street. It is divided from the mainland by the River Alde, and was formed by longshore drift along the coast. The material of the spit comes from places further north, such as Dunwich. Near the middle point of its length, at the foreland point or "Ness", once stood Orfordness Lighthouse, demolished in summer 2020 owing to the encroaching sea. In the name of the lighthouse (and the radio transmitting station – see below), "Orfordness" is written as one word.

== Description ==
Orford Ness is an internationally important site for nature conservation. It contains a significant portion of the European reserve of vegetated shingle habitat, which is internationally scarce, highly fragile, and very easily damaged. Together with Havergate Island the site is a designated National Nature Reserve and forms part of: the Alde-Ore Estuary Site of Special Scientific Interest (SSSI); the Alde, Ore & Butley Estuaries and the Orfordness-Shingle Street Special Area of Conservation (SAC); the Alde-Ore Estuary Special Protection Area (SPA); the Alde-Ore Estuary Ramsar Site site; the Suffolk Coasts and Heaths Area of Outstanding Natural Beauty (AONB); and the Suffolk Heritage Coast. It is also listed as of national importance in the Geological Conservation Review (GC), as a grade 1 site in the Nature Conservation Review. (NCR) and qualifies for the DEFRA Environmentally Sensitive Area (ESA) scheme.

== History ==
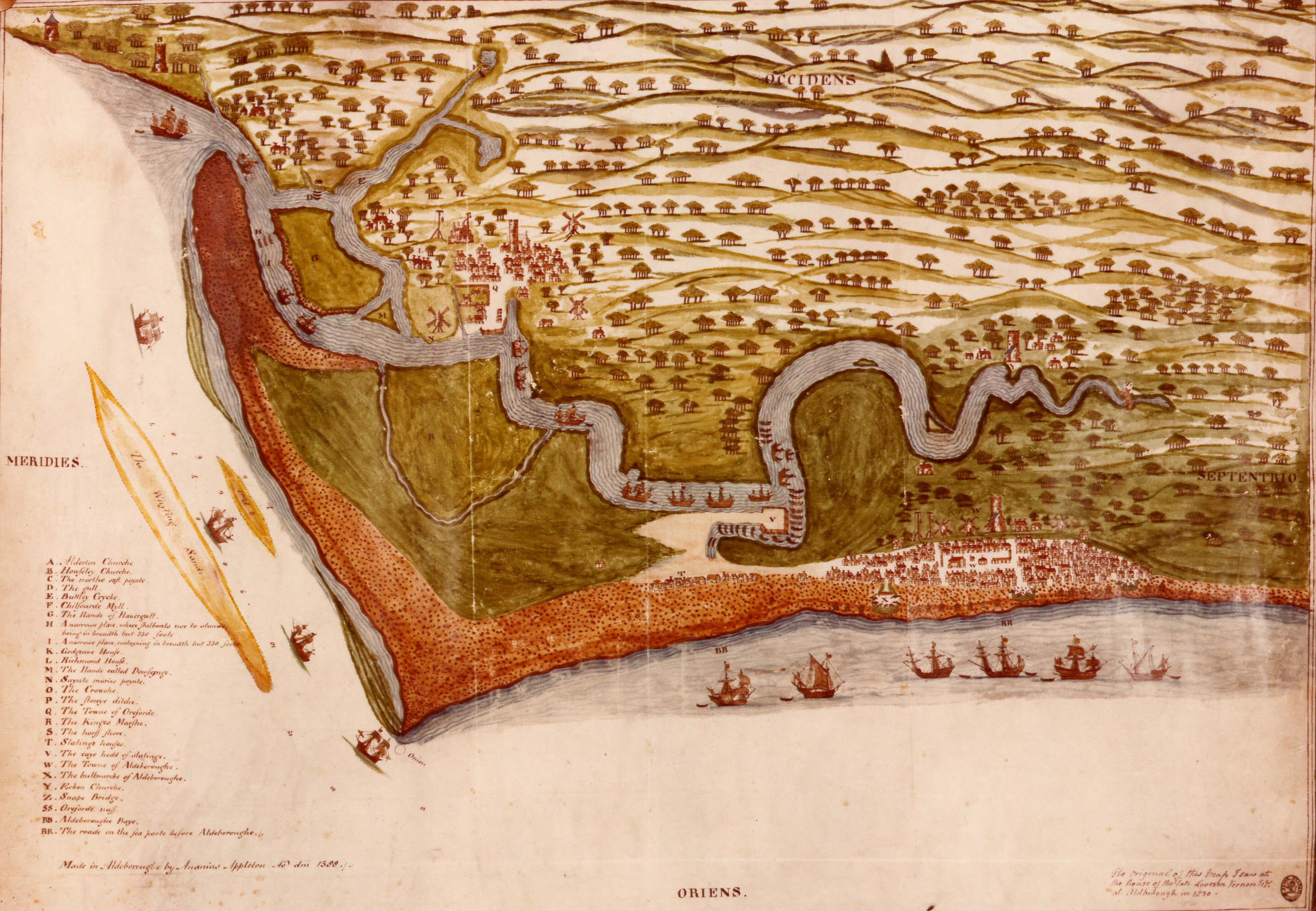
Orford Ness is the peninsula left of and below the river (River Alde) in this 1588 map

The peninsula was formerly administered by the Ministry of Defence, which conducted secret military tests during both world wars and the Cold War. The site was selected as the location for the Orfordness Beacon, one of the earliest experiments in long-range radio navigation. The Beacon was set up in 1929 and used in the pre-war era. In the 1930s Orford Ness was the site of the first purpose-built experiments on the defence system that would later be known as radar. Having proved the technology on Orford Ness, Robert Watson-Watt and his team moved to nearby Bawdsey Manor and developed the Chain Home radar system in time for its vital role in the Battle of Britain.

The Atomic Weapons Research Establishment had a base on the site, used for environmental testing, i.e. testing conducted to determine the functional performance of a component or system under conditions that simulate the real environment in which the component or system is expected to operate. Many of the buildings from this time remain clearly visible from the quay at Orford, including the distinctive "pagodas".

Orford Ness, Suffolk, showing locations of main sites.

In the late 1960s an experimental Anglo-American military over-the-horizon radar known as Cobra Mist was built on the peninsula. It closed in 1973, and in the late 1970s and early 1980s the site and building were re-used for the Orfordness transmitting station. This powerful medium-wave radio station – originally owned and run by the Foreign Office, then the BBC and, after privatisation in the 1990s, a series of private companies – was best known for transmitting the BBC World Service in English around the clock to continental Europe on 648 kHz from September 1982 until March 2011. The following year, the site became disused until Radio Caroline began broadcasting from it in December 2017.

National Trust researchers investigating a concrete ring 50m in circumference on Orford Ness believe it was part of a US Air Force over the horizon nuclear detonation and launch detection called R-System. The ring supported a steerable helical antenna, and remained a mysterious feature of Orford Ness until researchers contacted one of the designers of R-System, Ed Lyon, in 2020. Lyon was unaware that the US Air Force had constructed any R-System antenna in the UK; however the ring and surrounding structures are identical to sites in New Mexico.

Orford Ness is now owned by the National Trust and is open to the public under the name Orford Ness National Nature Reserve, though access is strictly controlled to protect the fragile habitats and due to a residual danger to the public from the site's former use by the military. Access is available only by the National Trust ferry from Orford Quay on designated open days. Urban explorers have also visited the site.

Rachel Woodward writes:

It is a place of strange contrasts. For the National Trust, its "elemental nature" contrasts with the "inherent dangers" of this place, a "hostile and potentially dangerous site". Military structures – the Bomb Ballistics Building, the Black Beacon, the "pagodas" used for explosive design – have been converted into viewing spots. This is not a celebratory site, however; there is ambivalence and doubt here, with regard to what is being physically and ideologically conserved. (Note: Note: Woodward states that the testing grounds closed in the early 1990s.)

Owing to its military history, its stark appearance and the fact that it was closed to the public for many decades, several apocryphal stories have circulated about Orford Ness. The best-known is the suggestion that Nazi troops attempted to invade England and actually disembarked at the tip of the peninsula near Shingle Street, before being repelled with a wall of fire. Official sources denied that any such attempted invasion took place, an assertion confirmed by classified documents released in 1993. More recently, the flashes of the lighthouse were implicated in the Rendlesham Forest UFO sightings of late December 1980. In 2013, Trinity House announced that the lighthouse was to be decommissioned as an aid to navigation and marked on UKHO charts as disused. It was demolished in summer 2020.

In September 2023, the National Trust employed contractor Bam (working with Historic England and University College London's Bartlett School for Sustainable Construction) to survey the site - in particular, the AWRE Labs 4 and 5, or pagodas - using drones and a dog-like robot named Spot, manufactured by US firm Boston Dynamics. Concrete decay meant the buildings could not be safely surveyed by human surveyors. National Trust archaeologist Angus Wainwright said the team wanted "to see if it's possible to do a really detailed building survey with no human operator in the building."

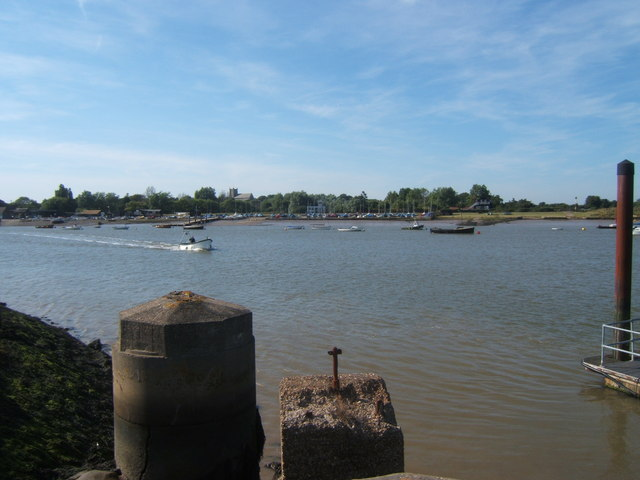
View from the Orford Ness dock towards Orford Quay

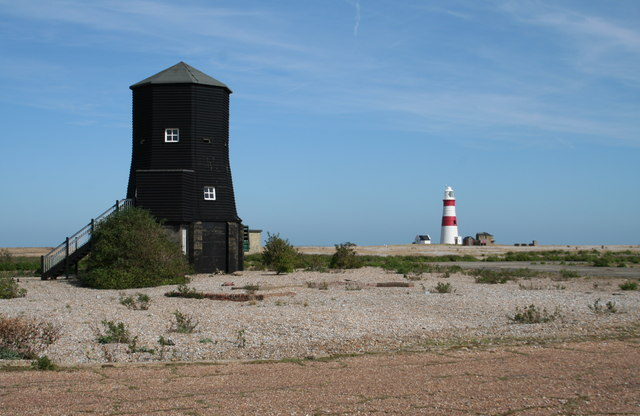
The "Black Beacon" radio navigation tower and the lighthouse

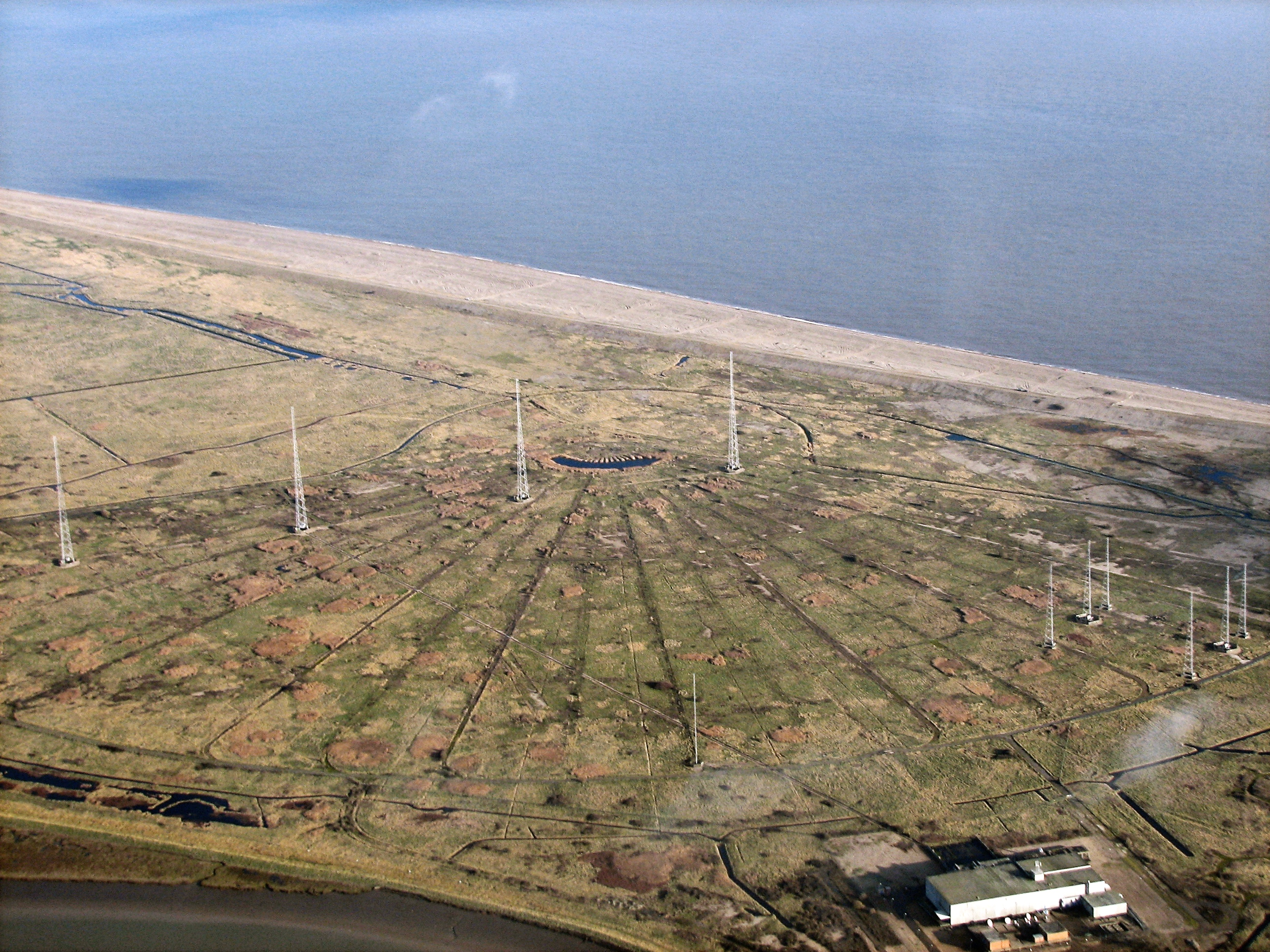
Aerial view of the Orfordness transmitting station

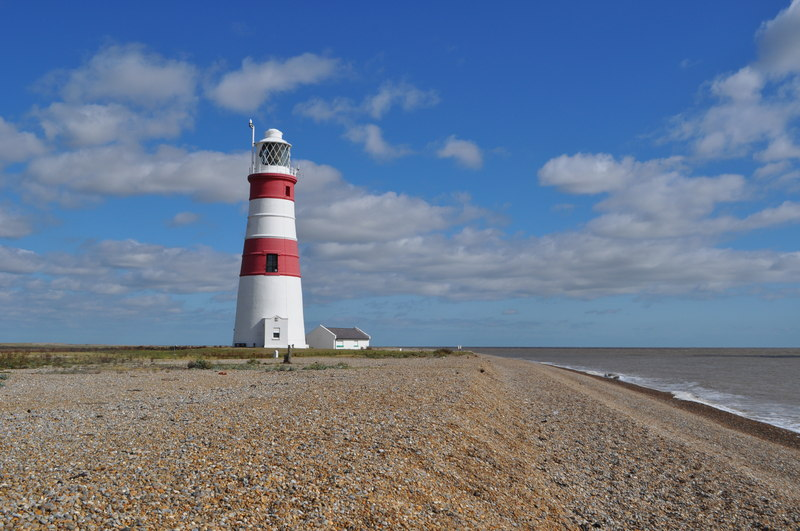
The lighthouse

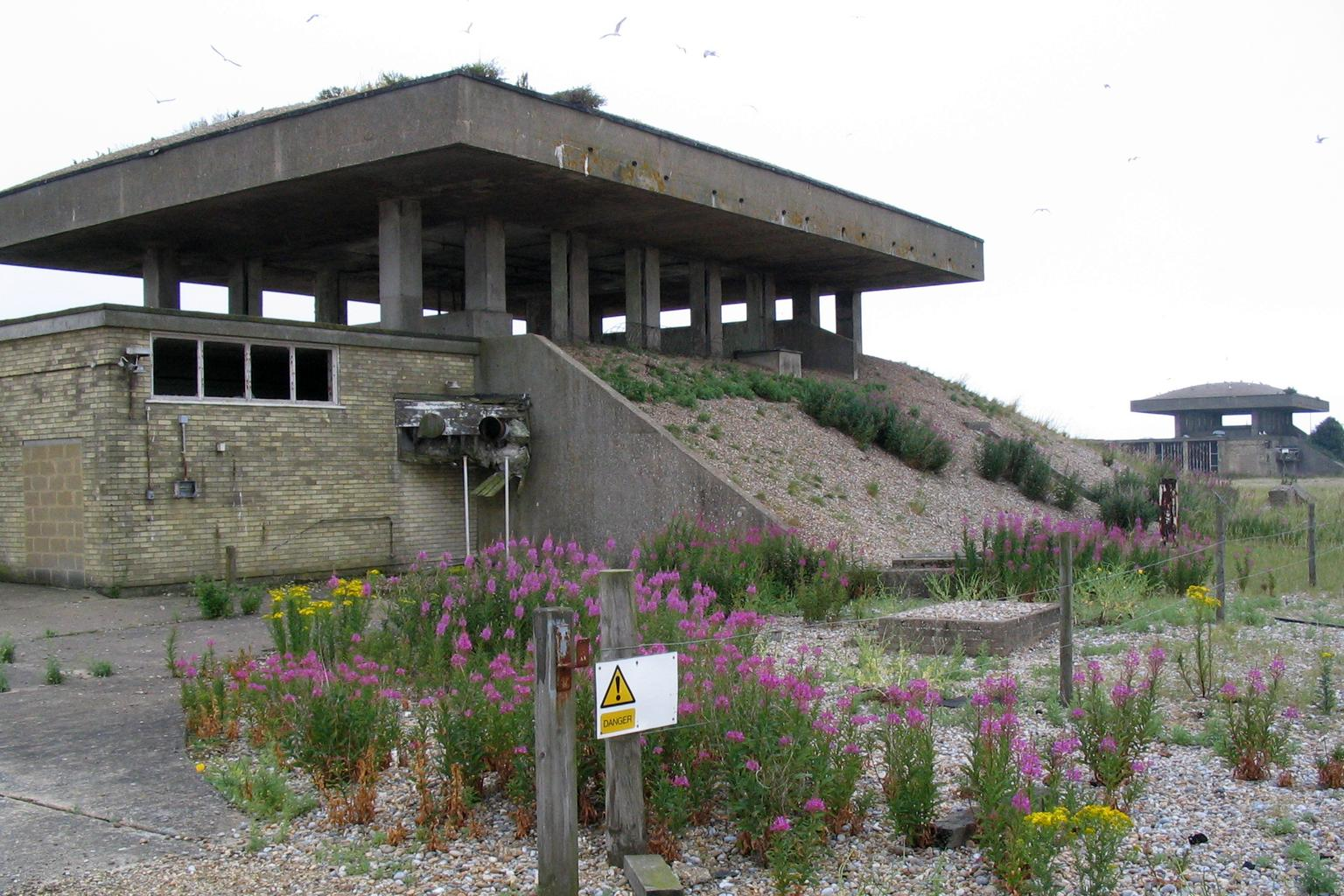
Exterior of two "pagodas"

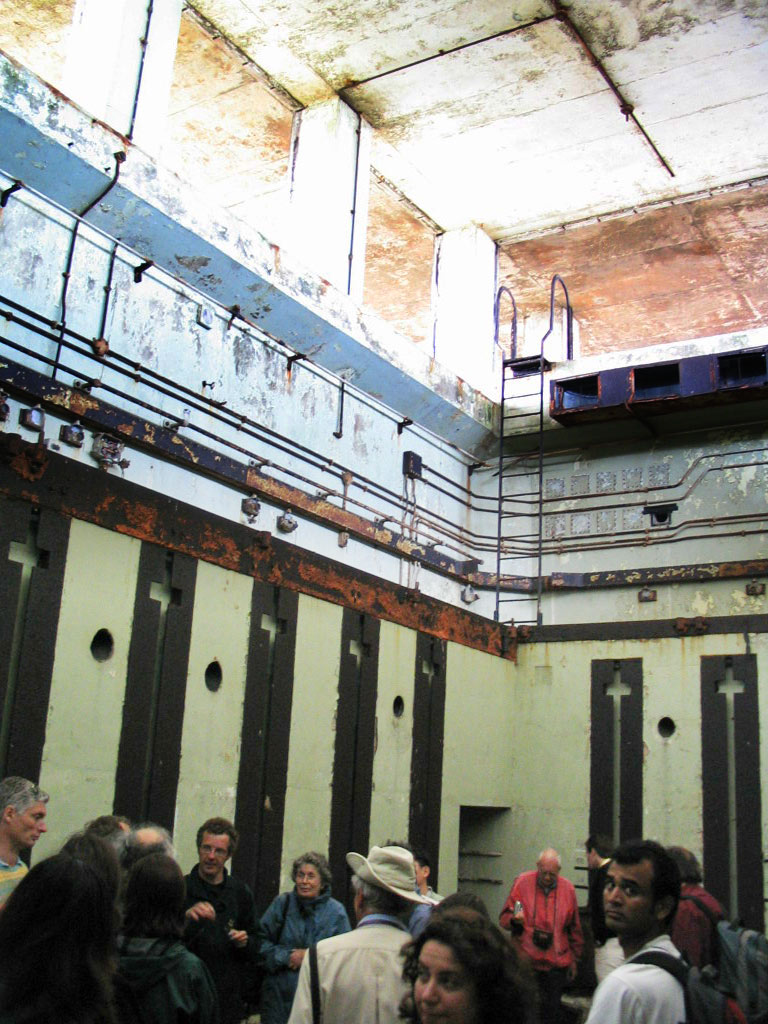
Interior of a "pagoda"

== Geography ==
Map showing the fluctuating historical extent of Orford Ness

Orford Ness is Europe's largest vegetated shingle spit. (Note: The name ness means 'promontory'. See Toulmin Smith, Joshua (1839). The Northmen in New England, Or, America in the Tenth Century. Hilliard, Gray, & co. p. 186.) It is approximately 10 miles (16 km) long, and the site covers a total area of approximately 2,230 acres (900 ha). Forty percent of this (890 acres) is shingle, 25 percent (556 acres) tidal rivers, mud flats, sand flats, and lagoons, eighteen percent (400 acres) grassland, and fifteen percent (330 acres) salt marsh.

The spit formed almost entirely of flint deposited by waves through the process of long-shore drift. The main influence on its formation has been storm waves throwing shingle over the top of the beach crest, where it is protected from ordinary wave action. Over time, this process leads to the formation of stable ridges of fine particles, and swails of coarser shingle.

The size and shape of the spit have fluctuated over time (see map). Estimated growth rates range from 64m per year in 1962 to 1967, to 183m per year in 1804 to 1812. Between 1812 and 1821, the total length fluctuated by 1.8 miles (2.9 km). As a result of the dynamically changing nature of the spit, the true age of its formation is unknown. However, before about 1200, Orford is thought to have been a port facing the open sea.

== See also ==
- Wartime events at Shingle Street, Suffolk, are explored in more detail in two books by James Hayward.
- Orford Castle, a Norman keep overlooking Orfordness and Orford Island
- Night Invisible Varnish Orfordness, a type of British military aircraft paint
- Havergate Island, an RSPB Reserve
- Seaplane Experimental Station, another research station at Felixstowe
- Aeroplane and Armament Experimental Establishment, another nearby experimental station at Martlesham Heath Airfield
