= River Alde =

River system in Suffolk, England

Alde and Ore
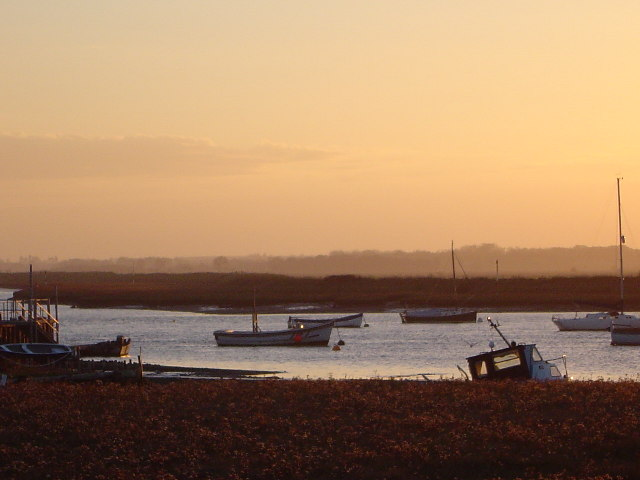
- The river at Aldeburgh

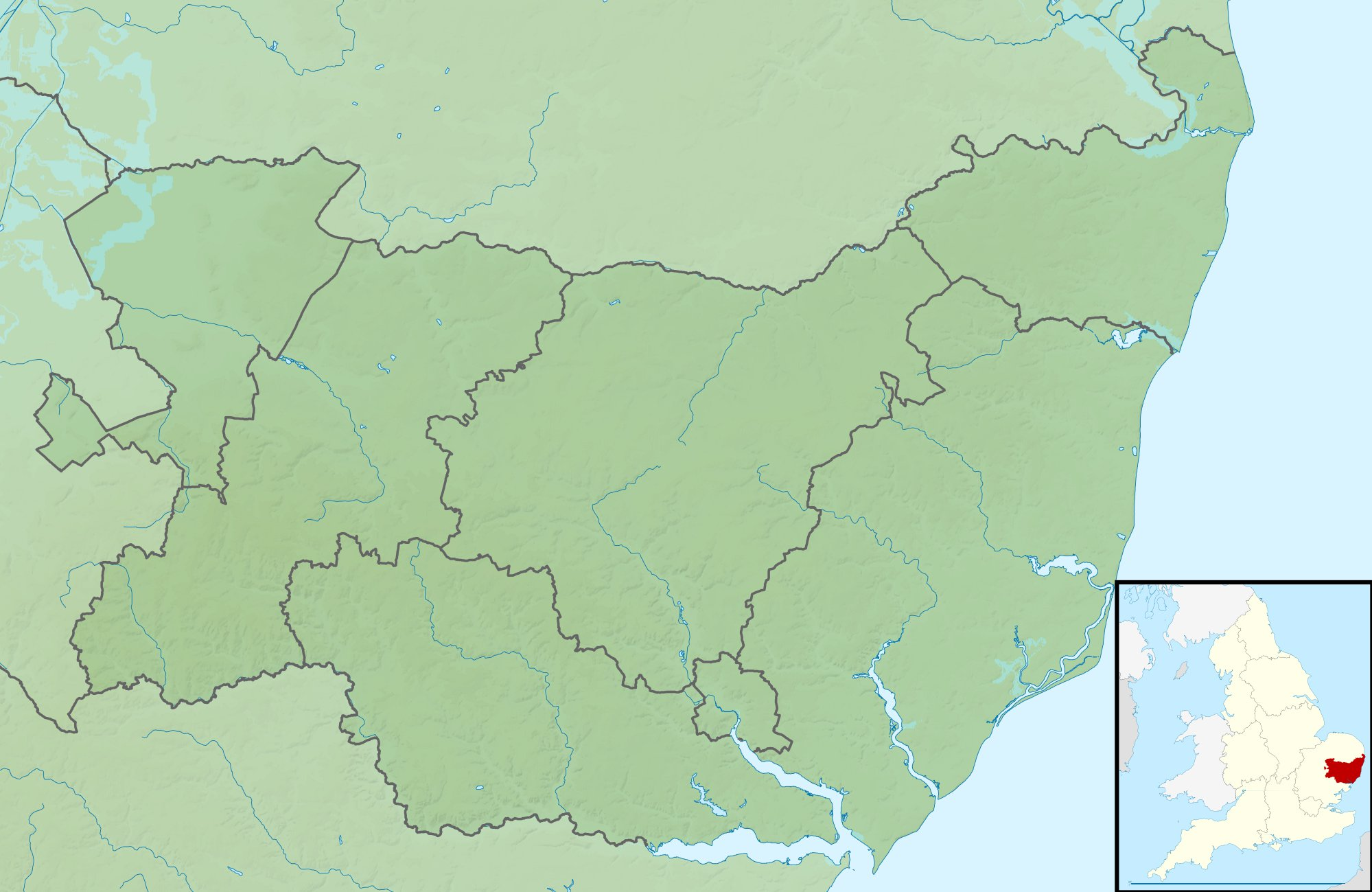
- Location of the river mouth within Suffolk

Location
- Country: England
- Region: Suffolk

Physical characteristics
- Source
  - location: Brundish
  - coordinates: 52.2799°N 1.3048°E
  - elevation: 60 m (200 ft)
- 2nd source
  - location: Saxtead
  - coordinates: 52.2505°N 1.3006°E
  - elevation: 57 m (187 ft)
- Mouth
  - location: North Sea
  - coordinates: 52.0401°N 1.4607°E
  - elevation: 0 m (0 ft)
- Length: 54.4 km (33.8 mi)

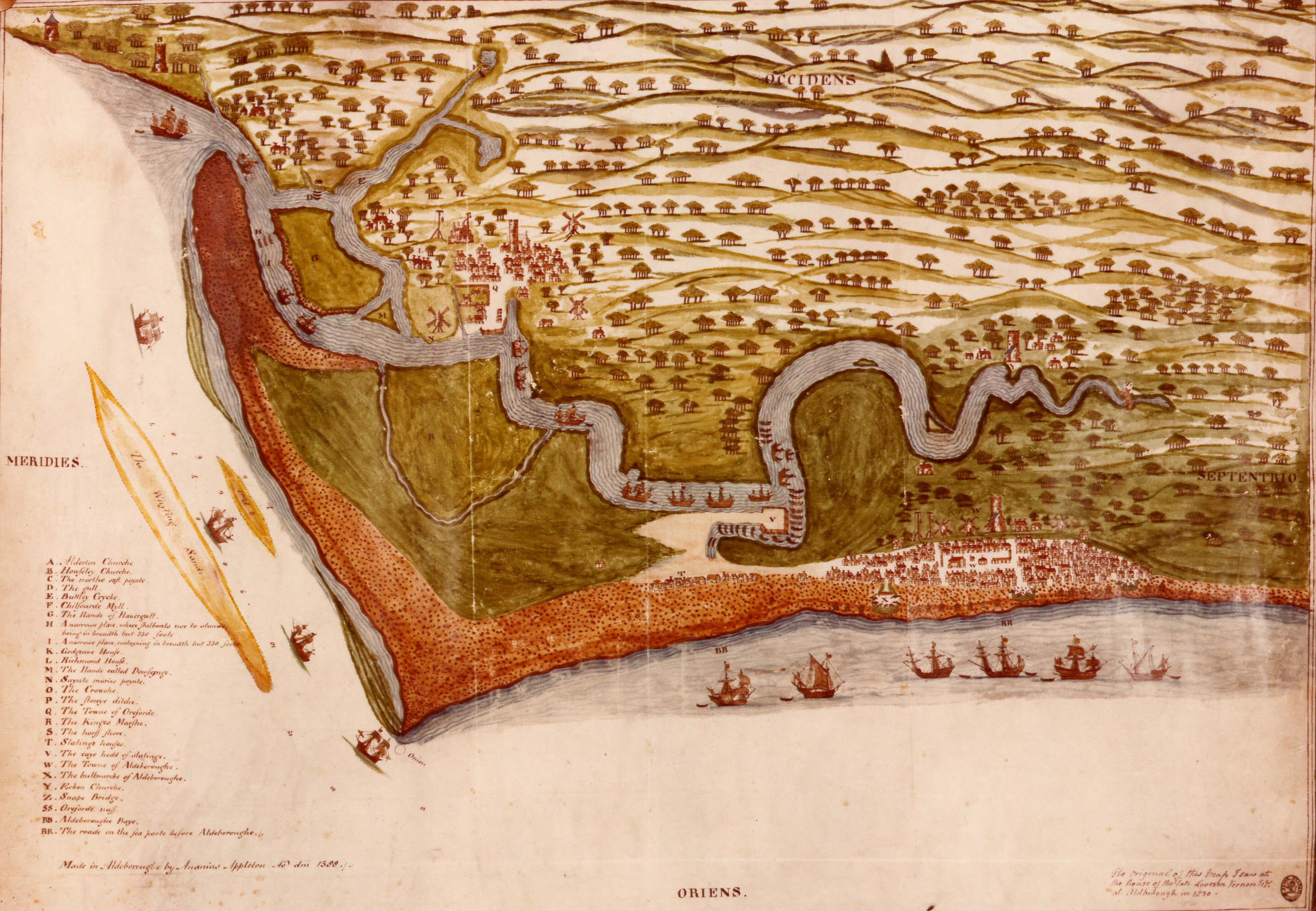
The river as depicted in a 1588 map

The River Alde and River Ore form a river system in Suffolk, England passing by Snape and Aldeburgh. The River Alde and River Ore meet northwest of Blaxhall. From there downriver the combined river is known as the River Alde past Snape and Aldeburgh, and then again as the River Ore as it approaches Orford and flows by a shingle spit before emptying into the North Sea.

Both rivers are named by back-formation from key towns on their route: the Alde is named from Aldeburgh, and the Ore is named from Orford.

The first section of the River Ore flows around 18 kilometres (11 mi) from its sources west of Dennington south and east through Framlingham, Parham and Marlesford, meeting the River Alde to the northwest of Blaxhall.

The source of the River Alde is Brundish near Laxfield in the same area as the River Blyth. Soon after combining with the River Ore, it reaches Snape where it becomes tidal and widens considerably. It meanders east past Aldeburgh, before being turned south and running parallel to the coastline behind a narrow shingle spit.

The River Ore is the name of the final section of around 11 kilometres (6.8 mi) of the river, from just above Orford to the sea. It has one tributary, the Butley River, and Havergate Island is found at their confluence. Though it once entered the sea near Orford, the mouth of the river has now been pushed some five miles further south as shingle has accumulated over hundreds of years.

During Tudor times, the river served as a port from which four ships were launched to fight against the Spanish Armada. The river no longer serves as a commercial port but as an area for yacht sailing.

The lower reaches of the river pass through marshland and shingle or sand beaches, most of which is now owned by the National Trust as the "Orford Ness National Nature Reserve". Before the National Trust took ownership of this land, it was the site of a secret military base where Cobra Mist trials of over-the-horizon radar were carried out during the Cold War.

The shingle spit that blocks the river, Orford Ness, is now some 16 kilometres (10 mi) in length and is owned by the National Trust, The main area through which the Rivers Alde and Ore flow is open countryside in private ownership, much of it arable farmland.

The tidal reaches (below Snape Bridge) are within the Suffolk Coast and Heaths Area of Outstanding Natural Beauty, as well as being a Site of Special Scientific Interest, a designated Special Area of Conservation and a Special Protection Area. An RSPB reserve, Boyton Marshes, is situated between the River Ore and the Butley River. A registered charity, the Alde & Ore Association, exists to "preserve and protect for the public benefit the Alde, Ore and Butley Creek rivers and their banks from Shingle Street to their tidal limits".

The novel What I Was by Meg Rosoff is set on the coastline where the River Ore meets the sea.

Orford Ness, Suffolk, showing locations of main sites.

== Alde Mudflats ==
An area of mudflats 22 hectares (54 acres) on the southern side of the river, near Iken, is managed by the Suffolk Wildlife Trust as their Alde Mudflats nature reserve: there is no public land access to prevent a human disturbance.

== See also ==
- Suffolk Coast and Heaths
- River Ore, Fife
