= Paget =

Paget may refer to:

== People ==
Paget is a surname of Anglo-Norman origin. It is also used as a given name. Notable people with the name include:

=== Surname ===
- Augustus Paget (1823–1896), British diplomat
- Augustus Paget (RAF officer) (1898–1918), British soldier
- Lord Alfred Paget (1816–1888), British soldier, courtier and politician
- Almeric Paget, 1st Baron Queenborough (1861–1949), British cowboy, industrialist, yachtsman and politician
- Sir Arthur Paget (British Army officer) (1851–1928), British Army general
- Sir Bernard Paget (1887–1961), British Army general
- Lady Caroline Paget (1913–1973), British socialite and actress
- Charles Paget, 6th Marquess of Anglesey (1885–1947), British soldier
- Charles Paget, 8th Marquess of Anglesey (born 1950), British nobleman
- Charles Paget (conspirator) (c. 1546–1612), Roman Catholic conspirator
- Charles Paget (politician) (1799–1873), MP for Nottingham in the 1850s
- Charles Paget (Royal Navy officer) (1778–1839), MP and vice-admiral
- Charles Souders Paget (1874–1933), American architect in Canton, China
- Christopher Paget (born 1987), English cricketer
- Clara Paget (born 1988), British model and actress
- Lord Clarence Paget (1811–1895), Royal Navy admiral, politician and sculptor
- David Paget (1943–1997), Australian mathematician
- Debra Paget (born 1933), American actress and entertainer
- Dorothy Paget (1905–1960), British racehorse owner and sponsor of motor racing
- Sir Edward Paget (1775–1849), British Army general
- Edward Paget (bishop) (1886–1971), English bishop
- Francis Paget (1851–1911), English theologian, author and Bishop of Oxford
- Francis Edward Paget (1806–1882), English clergyman and author
- George Paget, 7th Marquess of Anglesey (1922–2013), British soldier and author
- Henry Paget (disambiguation), several people
- Sir James Paget (1814–1899), English surgeon and pathologist
- Jock Paget (born 1983), New Zealand equestrian
- John Paget (priest) (died 1638), pastor at the English Reformed Church, Amsterdam
- John Paget (author) (1808–1892), English agriculturist and writer on Hungary
- John Paget (barrister) (1811–1898), English police magistrate and author
- Julian Paget, British Army officer and military historian, son of General Sir Bernard
- Michael Paget (born 1978), Welsh musician, singer, songwriter, and guitarist
- Reginald Paget (1908–1990), British lawyer and politician
- Rosalind Paget (18551948), British nurse, midwife and reformer
- Sidney Paget (1860–1908), British illustrator of Sherlock Holmes stories
- Stephen Paget (1855–1926), English surgeon
- Sybil Paget (1872-1965), pseudonym for American artist and composer Bertha Remick
- Thomas Paget (disambiguation), several people
- Walter Trueman Paget (1854–1930), farmer and politician in Queensland, Australia
- William Paget (disambiguation), several people

=== Given name ===
- Paget Toynbee (1855–1932), British scholar
- Paget Brewster (born 1969), American actress

== Places ==
- Paget Parish, Bermuda
- Paget Peak, a mountain in British Columbia, Canada
- Paget Island, Bermuda
- Paget Marsh Nature Reserve, Bermuda
- Mount Paget, highest peak on South Georgia island

== See also ==
- Paget baronets
- Paget's disease (disambiguation), diseases described by Sir James Paget
- Paget process, early technique for colour photography
- Operation Paget, British police inquiry into the death of Diana, Princess of Wales
- Paget Rangers F.C., semi-professional English football team
- Padgett (surname)
