= Paget baronets of Harewood Place (1871) =

Escutcheon of the Paget baronets of Harewood Place

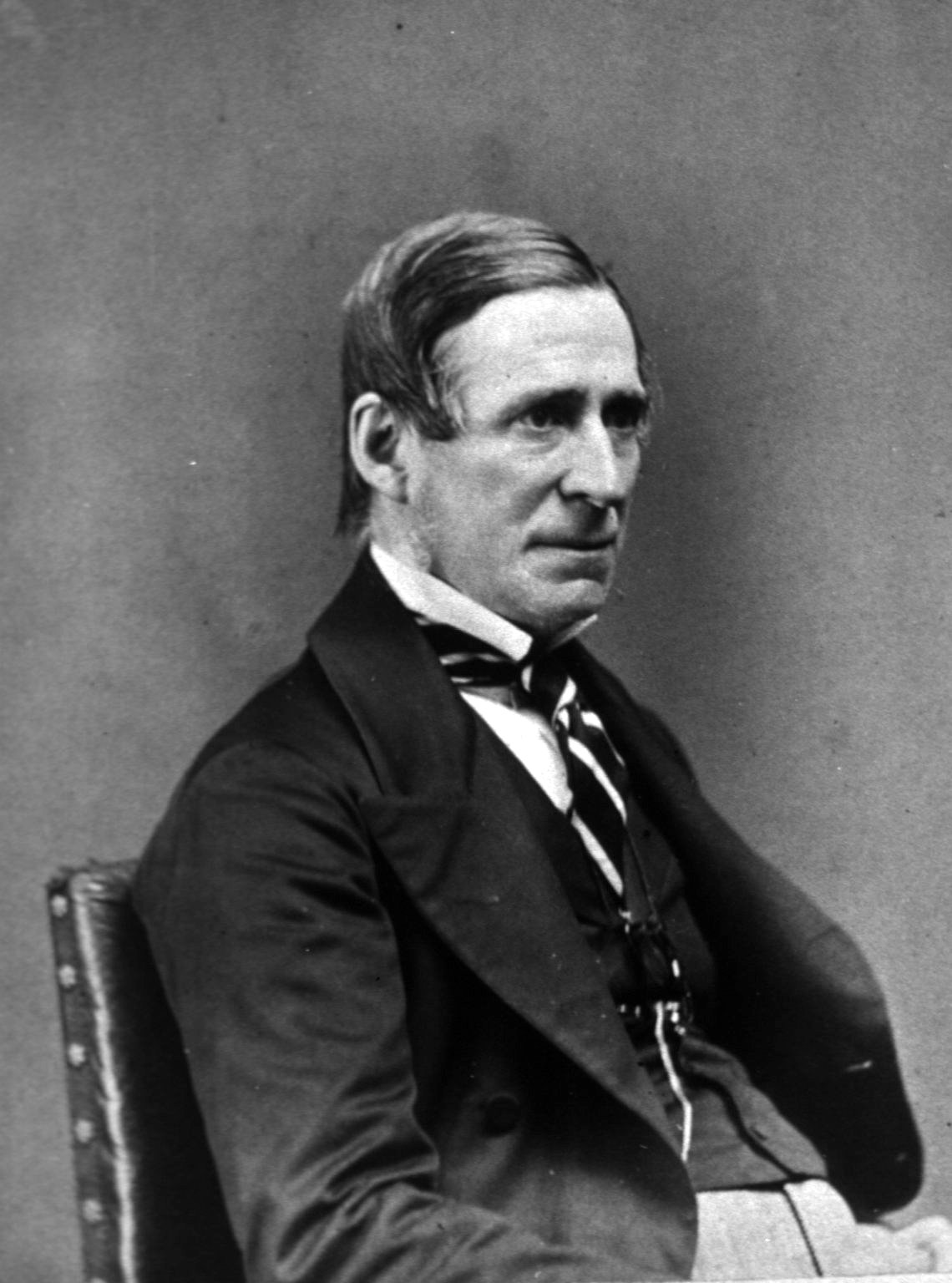
Sir James Paget, 1st Baronet of Harewood Place

The Paget baronetcy, of Harewood Place in the County of Middlesex, was created in the Baronetage of the United Kingdom on 19 August 1871 for the surgeon and pathologist James Paget.

The 4th Baronet was a lieutenant-colonel in the Coldstream Guards, courtier and author.

== Paget baronets, of Harewood Place (1871) ==
- Sir James Paget, 1st Baronet (1814–1899)
- Sir John Rahere Paget, 2nd Baronet (1848–1938)
- Sir James Francis Paget, 3rd Baronet (1890–1972)
- Sir Julian Tolver Paget, 4th Baronet CVO (1921–2016)
- Sir Henry James Paget, 5th Baronet (born 1959)

The heir apparent is the present holder's son Bernard Halfdan Paget (born 1994).

== Extended family ==
Francis Paget, second son of the 1st Baronet, was Bishop of Oxford; his son Sir Bernard Paget was a general in the British Army. The latter was the father of the 4th Baronet. Stephen Paget, another son of the 1st Baronet, was also a noted surgeon.
