= Padgett =

Padgett is a surname, and may refer to:

- Cliff Padgett (1879–1951), American boat builder
- Dirk Padgett, American lawyer
- Don Padgett (1911–1980), American baseball player
- Doug Padgett (1934–2024), English cricketer
- Ernie Padgett (1899–1957), American baseball player
- George W. Padgett (1858–1916), American politician from Maryland
- Guy Padgett (born 1977), American politician
- Hubert Padgett (born 1931), British cricketer
- John Padgett (1860–1943), cricketer
- Joy Padgett (born 1947), American politician
- Keith Padgett, Falkland Islands politician
- Lemuel P. Padgett (1855–1922), American politician
- Lewis Padgett, pseudonym of authors Henry Kuttner and C. L. Moore
- Marty Padgett, American journalist
- Ron Padgett (born 1942), American poet, essayist, fiction writer, and translator
- Scott Padgett (born 1976), American basketball player and coach
- Travis Padgett (born 1986), American track and field athlete
- An American family of basketball people:
  - Jim Padgett (1930–2009), coach
  - Pete Padgett (born 1954), Jim's son, player and coach
  - David Padgett (born 1985), Pete's son, player and coach

== Given name ==
- Padgett Powell (born 1952), American novelist

== See also ==
- Paget (disambiguation)
