= Lover's Lake killifish =

Scientific classification
- Kingdom: Animalia
- Phylum: Chordata
- Class: Actinopterygii
- Order: Cyprinodontiformes
- Family: Fundulidae
- Genus: Fundulus
- Species: F. relictus

Binomial name
- Fundulus relictus Able & Felley, 1988

Synonyms
- Fundulus rhizophorae non Goode, 1877

Species of fish

Lover's Lake killifish (Fundulus relictus) is a species of killifish endemic to the Atlantic archipelago of Bermuda, an overseas territory of the United Kingdom.

The Lover's Lake killifish is presumably descended from one or several colonization events by the F. heteroclitus - F. grandis species complex from the Atlantic coast of North America. It shares the island chain with the related Bermuda killifish, another killifish species also endemic to Bermuda, and was formerly synonymized with it. These two species are indistinguishable in the field, and differentiated by egg morphology and body measurements. Despite this, no pond in Bermuda has been found to contain multiple killifish species together. It has been suggested that there may be more distinct species of Killifish previously described as F. relictus.

On average, the Lover's Lake killifish measures 5.1 centimeters long, growing up to 9.7 centimeters. Females are generally larger than males. The male is dark green with a yellow underside and a dark ocellus on the dorsal fin when spawning. The female is brown or olive in colour, paler below. Females are generally larger in size than males. The Lover's Lake killifish feeds opportunistically. Its omnivorous diet includes filamentous green algae, plant material, molluscs, crustaceans and insects.

The Lover's Lake killifish was formerly described alongside the Bermuda killifish (F. bermudae) as abundant throughout the islands' wetland communities, but populations declined after disruption of their habitats through the 19th and 20th centuries. During this period, marshland was filled in for mosquito control and garbage disposal, leading to a 65% loss of Bermuda's marsh coverage. The Lover's Lake killifish is now found in only a few freshwater, brackish, and saline ponds on St. George's Island and St. David's Island, including Bartram's Pond and Lover's Lake, for which the species is named. While most of the ponds containing the killifish's populations are protected as nature reserves, they are often located near areas of high development, leading to risk of pollution. They are also threatened by native predators such as diamondback terrapins, grey snappers, American eels and birds, including the reintroduced yellow-crowned night heron, as well as introduced predators such as red-eared sliders and eastern mosquitofish.
