= John Paget =

John Paget may refer to:

- John Paget (author) (1808–1892), English agriculturist and writer on Hungary
- John Paget (barrister) (1811–1898), English police magistrate and author
- John Paget (Puritan minister) (died 1638), English nonconforming minister, pastor at the English Reformed Church, Amsterdam
- Sir John Rahere Paget, 2nd Baronet (1848–1938), British barrister and author
