= Paget, Bermuda (disambiguation) =

Paget Parish is one of the nine parishes of Bermuda.

Paget, Bermuda may also refer to:

- Paget Marsh Nature Reserve in Paget Parish, Bermuda
- Paget Island in St. George's Parish, Bermuda
