= George Paget (disambiguation) =

Lord George Paget (1818–1880) was a British Army general during the Crimean War.

George Paget may also refer to:

- Sir George Edward Paget (1809–1892), English physician and academic
- Henry Paget, 7th Marquess of Anglesey (George Charles Henry Victor Paget, 1922–2013), British peer

== See also ==
- Sir George Paget Thomson (1892–1975), English physicist
- Hubert Padgett (George Hubert Padgett, born 1931), English cricketer
