= Evolutionary toxicology =

Impact of toxins on evolution

Evolutionary toxicology is an emerging field of science focusing on shifts in population genetics caused by the introduction of contaminants to the environment. Research in evolutionary toxicology combines aspects of ecotoxicology, population genetics, evolutionary biology, and conservation genetics to form a unified field investigating genome and population wide changes in genetic diversity, allelic frequency, gene flow, and mutation rates. Each of these areas of investigation is characterized as one of four central tenets to the field, proposed and described in detail by John Bickham in 2011.

There are multiple ways by which a contaminant can alter the genetics of a population. Some contaminants are genotoxicants, causing DNA mutations directly by damaging the structure of the DNA molecule. These DNA mutations can take several forms, including deletions, duplications, and substitutions, all of which may be heritable. Non-genotoxicant contaminants can detrimentally impact organisms just as severely with behavioral alteration caused by the stress of a contaminated environment, leading to changes in reproductive success. Genetic change at the population level is one long term result of both genotoxicant and non-genotoxicant exposure.

Evolved responses to an environmental contaminant are often seen in the case of target species developing resistance to pesticides (including insecticides, herbicides, and fungicides), but they can also be observed in non-target organisms' response to pesticides, as well as in organisms exposed to toxic waste and byproducts of industrial activities.

== History and background ==
A relatively new field of science, evolutionary toxicology was initially described in the early 1990s as a specialized subset of Ecotoxicology. Though the field itself is a recent development, some of the earliest evolution in Earth's history began as a response to toxic substances in the environment, including heavy metals, ultraviolet light, and microbial toxins. Additionally, evidence of evolutionary responses to contaminants has been documented for over a century, with the first instance of documented pesticide resistance occurring in 1914. Further, Rachel Carson's 1962 environmental treatise Silent Spring argued that consistent use of DDT would lead to decreased effectiveness in reducing mosquito populations.

Historically, evolution was considered a process that shaped populations over millennia. The current scientific consensus has shifted to include the determination that evolution can be observed on a much smaller timescale - within a few generations of some highly adaptable organisms. Evolutionary responses can even occur within a single generation via genetic plasticity present in some species; evidence of the contributions of plasticity in evolved responses to pesticides has been seen in flies and wood frogs.

Within the evolutionary process, selection pressures favor organisms best suited to their environment, allowing them to pass on genes contributing to any beneficial hereditary traits they may possess. Some contaminants have recently been determined to act as a selective force, joining other natural and anthropogenic selection pressures to favor organisms with inherent resistance or those able to develop resistance. Resistant organisms can then contribute a disproportionately larger genetic influence to the next generation, as compared to individuals with less favored traits.

== Evolutionary mechanisms ==
Different evolutionary mechanisms can result in similar observable responses of increased resistance to environmental presence of contaminants. Generally speaking, the contaminant acts as a selective force, allowing organisms with resistance to persist and contribute genes to the next generation.

One route of potential resistance evolution involves de novo mutations, or beneficial mutations conferring resistance that arise after the introduction of the contaminant. Conversely, in some cases there are advantageous mutations found within variation that exists in the population before the introduction of the contaminant, and only discovered to be beneficial after exposure.

In plants developing resistance to herbicides, additional mechanisms of resistance can be observed. Processes include increasing ability of plants to quickly metabolize herbicides, sealing off herbicide in vacuoles to reduce contact with target site, and up-regulating target enzymes, which increases herbicide concentrations necessary for plant mortality. Acetolactate synthase (ALS) inhibition is a frequent mode of action in many of the most widely used herbicides, with target site point mutations seen as the leading cause of evolved resistance to these herbicides.

Bacteria display several pathways through which resistance is evolved; they may pick up resistance genes through horizontal gene transfer or through independent individual mutations, which can accumulate over time.

== Known agents ==
Many contaminants have been shown to alter population genetics within a region. Toxicants introduced to the environment at high concentrations due to practices such as industrial production, power generation, or large scale agricultural pesticide application have been observed to cause evolutionary responses in organism populations. Known causative agents include:

- Polycyclic aromatic hydrocarbons
- Polychlorinated biphenyls
- Halogenated aromatic hydrocarbons
- Dioxins and dioxin-like compounds
- Insecticides (including organophosphates and carbamates)
- Herbicides
- Fungicides
- Petrochemical waste
- Heavy metals
- Radiation

== Examples ==
=== Vertebrates ===
A well documented instance of evolutionary toxicology can be seen in populations of Atlantic killifish in the Elizabeth River in southeastern Virginia, USA. Contaminants found in the Elizabeth River system include Polycyclic aromatic hydrocarbons, Polychlorinated biphenyls, and halogenated aromatic hydrocarbons, which are byproducts of industrial wood treatment, creosote production, and other industrial activities. The killifish here have evolved a higher resistance to the deleterious effects of extremely high levels of PAHs (Polycyclic aromatic hydrocarbon); the effects of PAH exposure include tumor development, malformation of cardiovascular system, and decreased immune function. Gulf killifish in the Houston Ship Channel have also shown evolved resistance to the deformities in embryonic cardiac development caused by Dioxins and dioxin-like compounds .

Wood frogs are emerging as another species displaying resistance to exposure to increasing concentrations of pesticides. Populations of wood frogs located closer to agricultural runoff containing carbaryl, chlorpyrifos, and malathion have shown higher exposure tolerance to those insecticides than populations located far from agricultural areas.

Radiation is a widely observed cause of increased mutation rates in exposed populations; while these mutations are not heritable they may impact the fitness of the affected individuals, reducing their gene flow into the population. These somatic exposure effects have been observed as a result of radiation exposure in Merriam's kangaroo rats and pond sliders. Radiation exposure has also produced heritable alterations to the mitochondrial DNA of bank voles, leading to increased genomic variation after successive generations existing in the vicinity of the Chernobyl meltdown site.

=== Invertebrates ===
One of the first instances of evolved responses to toxicants is the case of pesticide resistance in target species, exemplified in Anopheles gambiae, a species of malaria carrying mosquito.

A well studied incidence involves the evolution of the Peppered moth in response to air pollution caused by the industrial revolution in Europe. This example embodies the response to a non-genotoxicant contaminant, as the peppered moths of the melanic color morph were camouflaged by industrial smog and less likely to be predated. After the passage of clean air legislature, the selection pressure has been reversed in some localities.

Populations of two species of zooplankton (Daphnia pulex and Simocephalus vetulus) found near agricultural areas have shown resistance to Chlorpyrifos, a common organophosphate often associated with agricultural areas.

=== Plants ===
Evolutionary responses to toxicants have also been observed with the exposure of many plant species to increasing levels of herbicides. Globally, over two hundred weed species have evolved herbicide resistance, with 144 resistant weed species occurring in the United States, 62 in Canada, and 59 in Australia. Chlorsulfuron, Atrazine, Paraquat, and Glyphosate are a few of the herbicides to which weeds have developed resistance.

Though herbicides have varying modes of action and target sites, plants showing resistance or tolerance to one class of herbicides have been shown to exhibit resistance to other classes. Continuing development of herbicide resistance in weeds threatens to negatively affect crop yields in many areas.

=== Pathogens ===
In pathogens, the phenomena of antimicrobial resistance, and more specifically, antibiotic resistant bacteria is a frequently observed example of an evolutionary response. Some bacteria, such as Staphylococcus aureus and Escherichia coli have developed resistance to multiple antibiotics, becoming difficult to treat "super bugs".
