= Sir John Paget, 2nd Baronet =

British lawyer and specialist in banking law

- Born: John Rahere Paget; 9 March 1848; St Bartholomew's Hospital, London, England
- Died: 20 August 1938 (aged 90); Burnham, Buckinghamshire
- Occupations: Lawyer, writer
- Notable work: Law of Banking (1904)
- Spouse: Julia Norrie Moke (m. 1883; death 1926)

Sir John Rahere Paget, 2nd Baronet KC (9 March 1848 – 20 August 1938) was a British barrister and writer who was a specialist in banking law.

== Early life and education ==
He was born at St Bartholomew's Hospital in London, the eldest son of James Paget and Lydia North. His father was a noted surgeon and pathologist who was created a baronet in 1871. The family home was 1, Harewood Place in Hanover Square, Westminster. He was called Rahere after the 12th-century monk who founded St Bartholomew's, where his father received his medical training. His brothers included Francis Paget, the Bishop of Oxford; Luke Paget, Bishop of Chester; and surgeon Stephen Paget. John inherited the baronetcy after his father's death in 1899.

Paget was educated at Liverpool Royal Institution and at University of London. He entered Trinity Hall, Cambridge in 1866, earning a B.A. in 1870 and LL.B. in 1871. He was called to the bar in 1873.

== Career ==
Paget became a noted specialist on banking law and was sought after for his expertise in the area. He was a Gilbart Lecturer on banking in 1888. He became K.C. in 1902 and Bencher in 1908. In 1928, he was appointed an honorary Fellow of the Institute of Bankers. He assisted the Ministry of National Service on government recruiting and also advised the U.S. government on financial problems before the First World War.

In 1904, he published Law of Banking, a preeminent legal guide, and edited the two-volume text Legal Decisions Affecting Bankers. He also authored the articles on banking in Halsbury's Laws of England.

== Personal life ==
In 1883, Paget married American Julia Norrie Moke, daughter of George Lewis Augustus Moke and Ann Margaret Norrie Van Horne, daughter of Adam Norrie. They had twin sons and two daughters. He died in his sleep in 1938, aged 90. His elder son, Commander James Francis Paget of the Royal Navy, succeeded him in the baronetcy.

== Bibliography ==
- Paget, Sir John R. (1904). Law of Banking. London: Butterworth & Co.
- Paget, Sir John R. (1900). Legal Decisions Affecting Bankers: 1879–1900. Vol. I. London: Institute of Bankers.
- Paget, Sir John R. (1911). Legal Decisions Affecting Bankers: 1900–1910. Vol. II. London: Blades, East & Blades.

Baronetage of the United Kingdom
Preceded by James Paget	Baronet (of Harewood Place, Middlesex); 1871–1899	Succeeded by James Francis Paget
