= Marianne Cornevin =

French historian (1918–2010)

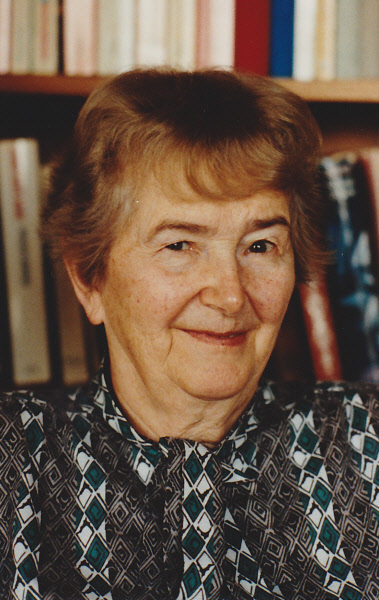

Marianne Cornevin (née Réau; 19 June 1918 – 9 November 2010) was a French historian and physician, specialising in the history of Africa. She also wrote a biography of Manon Roland, a major figure in the French Revolution.

== Life ==
=== Education ===
She was born in Royan, the fourth daughter of the art historian Louis Réau and his wife Madeleine Staehling. She was a Unionist Guide in the Fédération française des éclaireuses, attended the lycée Molière and then studied medicine despite her parents' opposition, gaining her diploma in 1942 with a thesis on Paget's disease.

=== Resistance and Africa ===
She joined the French Resistance as part of the group producing and distributing the Défense de la France newspaper via Hélène Viannay, who she had met through guiding. In March 1942, at the Reformed church in Passy in Paris, she married fellow Défense de la France member Robert Cornevin - they had six children between 1943 and 1953.

The couple settled in Africa later in 1942 when Robert was made a colonial administrator in French Dahomey, later moving to French Algeria and French Cambodia. Marianne set up a school doctor service and trained midwives, both in Cambodia, and worked as a physician herself during all her husband's postings. From 1948 to 1956 they were in Togo, his last posting before they returned to Paris.

=== Writing and death ===
After returning to mainland France she became a school doctor in Montrouge and assisted with the research for her husband's 1960 doctoral thesis. In 1966 she became an author in her own right as sole writer of volume 2 of Histoire de l'Afrique, a three-volume series of which her husband wrote the other two volumes. She was particularly interested in South Africa and produced three volumes in 1977 on apartheid in which she dismantled the ideological theories on which it was based. She also produced a volume on South Africa for the Que sais-je ? collection in 1982.

She took stock of the past twenty years' advances in African archaeology in her 1993 Secrets du continent noir révélés par l'archéologie, which focusses on the cultural differences across that continent. Also in 1993 she was awarded the prix Monsieur et Madame Louis-Marin by the Académie des sciences d'outre-mer. In 1995, the Académie des inscriptions et belles-lettres awarded her the prix Jean-Reynaud. She outlived her husband by twenty-two years but like him died in the 13th arrondissement of Paris.

== Publications ==
- L'Afrique précoloniale (1500-1900), 1966, 621 p., volume 2 of the Histoire de l'Afrique series
- Histoire de l'Afrique contemporaine - de la Deuxième Guerre mondiale à nos jours. Payot. 1972..
- L'Afrique du Sud en sursis, Hachette, 1977, p. 287 ISBN 2-01-004106-2
- L'Apartheid, pouvoir et falsification historique, Unesco, 1979
- La République sud-africaine, Puf, Que sais-je ? collection, 1982
- La Véritable madame Roland, 1989, republished as Liberté, que de crimes on commet en ton nom. Vie de madame Roland, guillotinée le 8 novembre 1793, Maisonneuve et Larose, 2002, p. 342
- Secrets du continent noir révélés par l'archéologie, Maisonneuve et Larose, 1993, p. 270

== Bibliography (in French) ==
- Cornevin-Ferrari, Geneviève (2015). "Marianne Cornevin, née Réau". In Encrevé, André; Cabanel, Patrick (eds.). Dictionnaire biographique des protestants français de 1787 à nos jours : A-C [Biographical dictionary of French Protestants from 1787 to the present day: A–C] (in French). Vol. I. Paris: Max Chaleil. p. 744.
- Étienne Cornevin, « Marianne Cornevin (1918 – 2010) », Journal des africanistes, vol. 81, no 1, 2011

== External links (in French) ==
- Valérie Landon (31 January 1995). "La pasionaria africaniste". liberation.fr.
