= Robert William Sievier =

British artist (1794–1865)

Robert William Sievier FRS (24 July 1794 – 28 April 1865) was a British engraver, sculptor and later inventor of the 19th century.

== Engraver and sculptor ==
Sievier showed an early talent for drawing, and studied under John Young and Edward Scriven, before attending the Royal Academy Schools from 1818. His speciality was portrait engravings, though he also did other works, including subjects from William Etty (whose portrait he also engraved). By 1823, however, he had abandoned engraving for sculpture. His sculpture portrait subjects included Prince Albert of Saxe-Coburg and Gotha and Sir Thomas Lawrence (the latter work now in the Sir John Soane's Museum). His students included William F Woodington and Musgrave Watson.

Sievier exhibited at the Royal Academy from 1822 until 1844, and his output there included several busts, figure subjects, gravestones and monuments. His first studio was in London's Southampton Row; in 1837, he relocated to Henrietta Street, near Cavendish Square, and he had a separate residence in Upper Holloway. His neighbour James Paget, a surgeon with a practice near Cavendish Square, wrote derisively of physician J. R. Hancorn's son: "Idle, dissipated, drinking,—associate of Sievier. Had to resign the House Surgeoncy; practised a few months with his father in Shoreditch; & died in 1860."

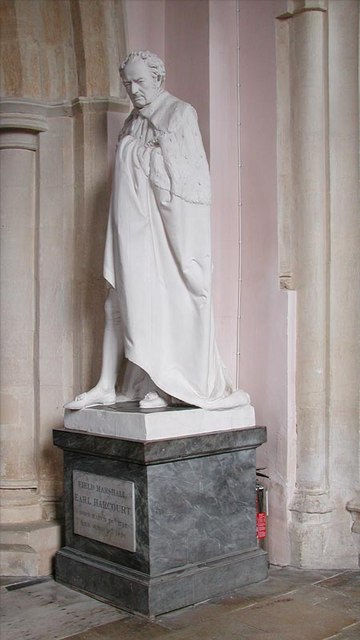
Sievier's plaster model for his statue of William Harcourt, 3rd Earl Harcourt

=== Other works ===
- statue of Charles Dibdin, at Greenwich
- statue of Field Marshal William Harcourt, 3rd Earl Harcourt (St Andrew's, Clewer, and St George's Chapel at Windsor Castle)
- a bust of Sir John Silvester in the Old Bailey
- a bust/monument to Sir George Paul (1746–1820), prison reformer and county administrator – in the south aisle of Gloucester Cathedral
- Portrait bust of Judge Robert Dallas (1756–1824) – produced in 1822
- a pediment decorated with urns and a sculpture of Flora in Coade stone, along the Central Avenue of Covent Garden Market Hall
- Statuette of Captain Thomas Coram, Foundling Hospital, London
- figure of Edward Jenner (d. 1823), discoverer of smallpox vaccination, set on a pedestal beside the west door of Gloucester Cathedral.
- chimney pieces at Chatsworth House, Derbyshire (executed with Richard Westmacott (the younger), c.1840)
- a monument to himself in Kensal Green Cemetery (Sievier had been a member of the Cemetery's board).
- monument to the memory of the late Mrs. Palmer of Ham Common at West Molesey.

In 1837 he came third in the competition to design a monument to Nelson in Trafalgar Square, with a proposal devised jointly with the architect Charles Fowler.

== Inventor ==
In 1836, Sievier patented a process for rubberising fabrics and formed a 'patent' company (the London Caoutchouc Company – caoutchouc being the original name for India rubber). The company became large-scale manufacturers of elastic driving bands for machinery, rope for mines, waterproof cloths and garments, and waterproof canvas, as well the first rubber-insulated wire. His interests in manufacturing took over from the early 1840s onwards. Sievier's factory was situated close to his home, the Old Manor House, in Upper Holloway, at the south corner of Red Cap Lane (later Elthorne Road). Sievier also carried out experiments in electrical telegraphy there. The house was demolished in 1897.

In Mar 1841 he was elected a Fellow of the Royal Society.

He died in Kentish Town, London and is buried in London's Kensal Green Cemetery.
