= J. R. Hancorn =

J. R. Hancorn MRCS LSA LRCPE
- Born: 14 February 1808; Alderney, Guernsey
- Died: 31 October 1861 (aged 53); Norton Folgate, City of London, England
- Education: Burney's Academy; St Bartholomew's Hospital; University of Aberdeen School of Medicine and Dentistry
- Occupations: Medical doctor; surgeon; apothecary; medical writer
- Years active: 1829–1861
- Medical career
- Profession: Doctor
- Notable works: Observations on Chloroform in Parturition: With Cases

James Richard Hancorn MRCS LSA LRCPE (14 February 1808 – 31 October 1861) was a British medical doctor and writer. His contributions to medical literature include Medical Guide to Mothers and Observations on Chloroform in Parturition.

== Early and personal life ==
Hancorn was born in Alderney, Guernsey on 14 February 1808. He attended Burney's Academy and was articled to Mr. Jenkins, a surgeon, at the age of 15. In 1827, he entered St Bartholomew's Hospital. He qualified in medicine as a Licentiate of the Society of Apothecaries (LSA) in 1829 and, for the next two years, acted as assistant to Mr. Terry, surgeon of Aylesbury. He settled in Sheerness, where he married Grace Kitt, daughter of Arthur Kitt, and was appointed as a coastguard surgeon in the Isle of Sheppey.

Hancorn began to decline following the death of his only son, a surgeon, at the age of 23. He died on 31 October 1861 in Norton Folgate in the City of London. His obituary stated:

"His disposition was affectionate to almost a fault, and this, together with his skill and success in practice, has endeared his memory to a very large circle of patients and friends."

== Career ==
In 1838, Hancorne gained membership of the Royal College of Surgeons (MRCS) and purchased an extensive practice in Shoreditch. He was then appointed Medical Inspector of Accidents to the Eastern Counties Railway, the duties of which he fulfilled with "strict integrity" until within two years of his death. In 1853, he graduated from the University of Aberdeen School of Medicine and Dentistry, and on relinquishing practice in 1860, became a Licentiate of the Royal College of Physicians of Edinburgh (LRCPE).

In 1843, William Bland claimed that Hancorn had laid claim to an invention of his, the means for the prevention of spontaneous combustion, which he claimed to have invented in 1839. Sir James Paget, 1st Baronet wrote briefly and derisively of Hancorn's son: "Idle, dissipated, drinking,—associate of Sievier. Had to resign the House Surgeoncy; practised a few months with his father in Shoreditch; & died in 1860."

Amongst his contributions to medical literature are Medical Guide to Mothers, Treatises on Consumption, Asthma, On the Medical and Domestic Treatment of Bronchitis and Hooping-cough, as well as contributions on the Physiology of the Liver, On the Plug in Uterine Hemorrhage. In addition, Hancorne wrote several articles for the peer-reviewed journals The Lancet and the London Medical Gazette.

=== Select bibliography ===
- Hancorn, J. R. (1842). Observations on a new remedy for consumption; suggested by Dr. Ulric Palmedo of Berlin – via AbeBooks.
- Hancorn, J. R. (1842). Medical Guide to Mothers.
- Hancorn, J. R. (1848). Observations on Chloroform in Parturition: With Cases. Smith, Elder and Company – via Google Books.

=== Select journal articles ===
- Hancorn, J. R. (20 October 1832). "Malignant Cholera Successfully Treated with Tincture of the Muriate of Iron". The Lancet. 19 (477): 108. doi:10.1016/S0140-6736(02)95469-3.
- Hancorn, J. R. (12 November 1836). "Coroner's Inquest With Deficient Evidence". The Lancet. 27 (689): 264. doi:10.1016/S0140-6736(02)84918-2.
- Hancorn, J. R. (7 August 1841). "Observations on the Physiology of the Liver". The Lancet. 36 (936): 682–684. doi:10.1016/S0140-6736(02)97559-8.
- Hancorn, J. R. (19 February 1842). "Observations on Rupture of the Uterus, with a Recent Case". The Lancet. 37 (964): 706–707. doi:10.1016/S0140-6736(00)33326-8.
- Hancorn, J. R. (1848). "On the Treatment of Asiatic Cholera". London Medical Gazette. 7 (42): 452–453.
- Hancorn, J. R. (9 September 1848). "Treatment of Cholera by Stimulants, Mercury, and Sesquichloride of Iron". The Lancet. 52 (1306): 290–291. doi:10.1016/S0140-6736(02)71946-6.
