= Saint Petersburg French Institute =

French cultural establishment in Saint Petersburg

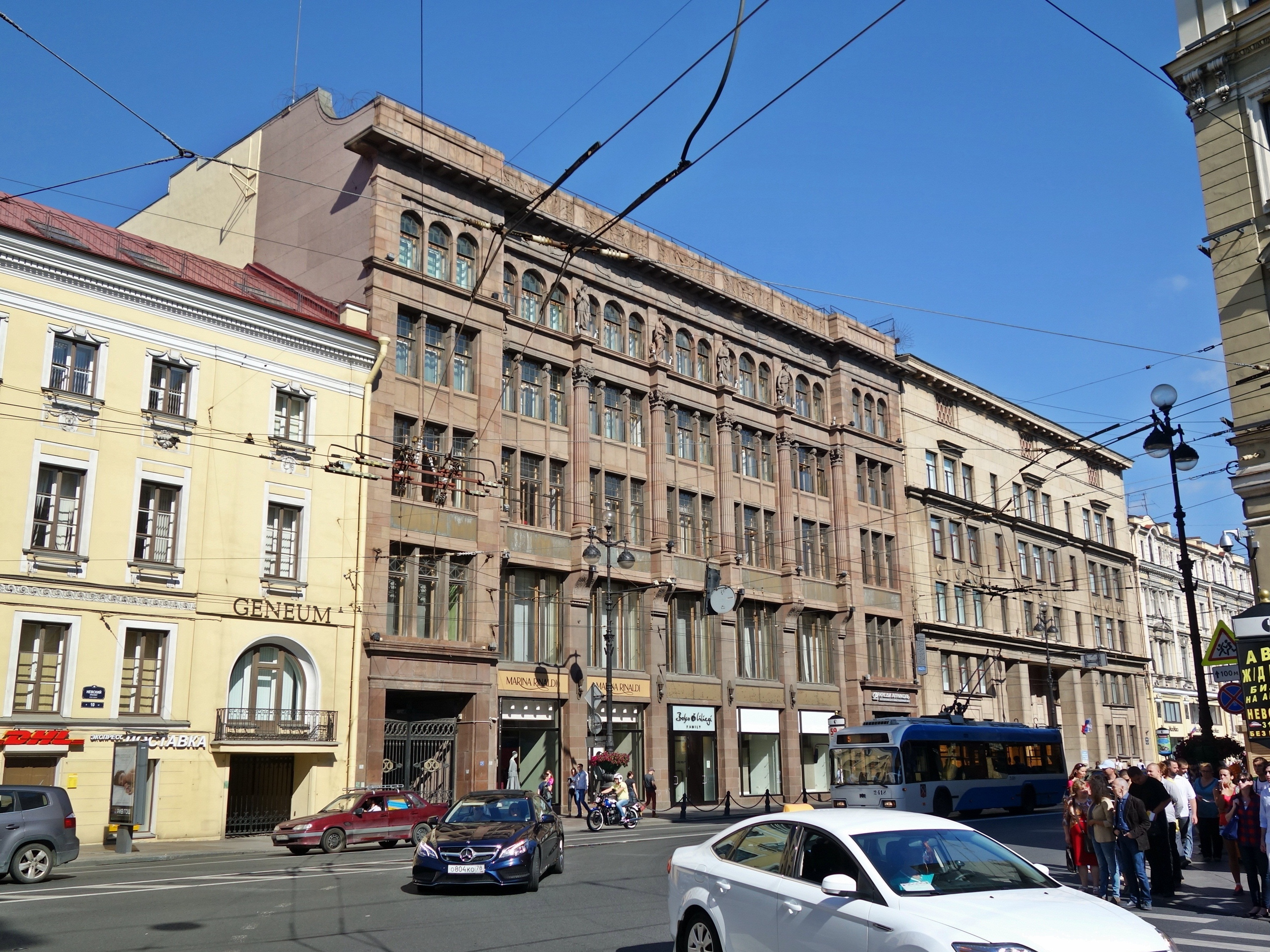

The Saint Petersburg French Institute (Institut français de Saint-Pétersbourg; Французский институт в Санкт-Петербурге) is a French cultural establishment in Saint Petersburg. Paul Doumer founded it in 1911 under the guidance of the French ambassador to Russia.

It has given courses in the French language since 2005 and also spreads French culture across northwest Russia, including Saint Petersburg itself, Kaliningrad, Murmansk, Arkhangelsk, Pskov, Petrozavodsk and Vologda.

== History ==
It was renamed the Institut français de Petrograd then the Institut français de Léningrad upon the city's renamings, abandoning most of its activities in the 1920s. It was officially closed in 1950 but reopened in 1992 after the fall of the USSR based on an accord between France and the new Russian Federation. It thus became the first western cultural centre in the city to base itself in the city under its original name.

It was then housed for fifteen years in the Chapel of the Order of Malta before moving to 12 Nevsky Prospect, on the site of the 1885 birthplace of the actor and film and theatre director Sacha Guitry. Since 2012 it has been a branch of the French Institute of Russia.

== Directors ==
- Alain Hélou (since 2015)
- Michel Grange (2011-2015)
- Edward de Lumley (2008-2011)
- Héléna Perroud (2005-2008)
- Jacques Martel (2004-2005)
- Bertrand de Hartingh (2001-2003)
- Christian Faure (1997-2001)
- Olivier Guillaume (1994-1997)
- Michel Tarran (1992-1994)
- Jules Patouillet (1913-1919), specialist in Alexander Ostrovsky's work
- Louis Réau (1911-1913)

== Bibliography (in French) ==
- Vladislav Rjéoutski, « L’Institut Français de Saint-Pétersbourg (1911-1919) et le rapprochement scientifique franco-russe », La Russie et la France, XVIIIe - XXe siecles, No. 7, sous la direction de Petr Tcherkassov, Moscou : Naouka, 2006, p. 293-322
- Vladislav Rjéoutski, « L’Institut Français de Saint-Pétersbourg » (texte en français et russe), L’Alliance Française et l’Institut Français de Saint-Pétersbourg, Saint-Pétersbourg, 2001

== External lniks ==
- Official site until 2012
- Article on the Institut français de Russie site
