= Louis Réau =

French art historian (1881–1961)

Louis Réau (1 January 1881, Poitiers – 10 June 1961, Paris) was a French art historian. His major contribution involved exploring French art's international influence. His magnum opus, Iconographie de l'Art Chrétien, in six volumes, encompasses all of Europe, including the Eastern Orthodox tradition.

== Life and work ==
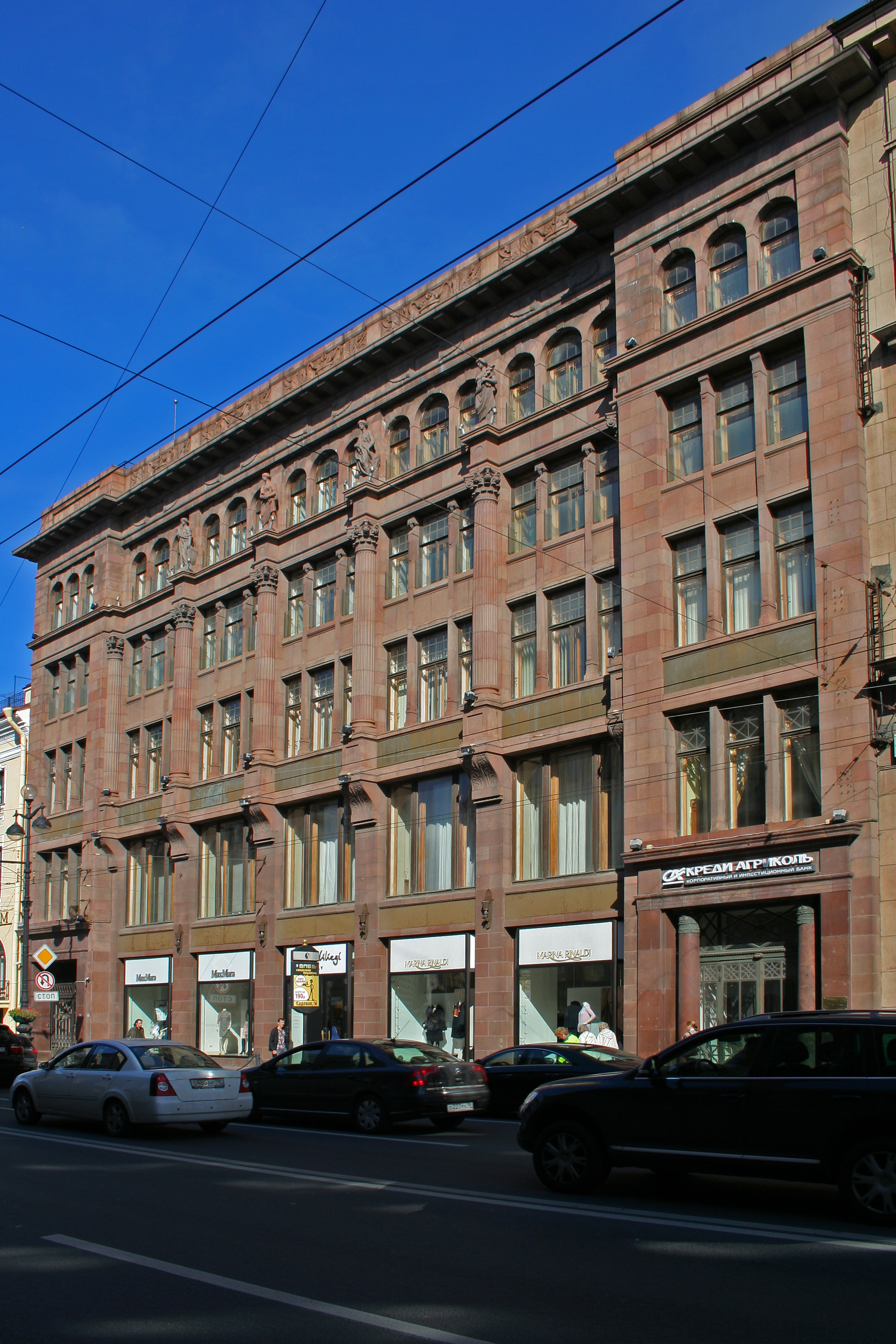
The former Institut français de Saint-Pétersbourg

He studied at the École Normale Supérieure in Paris then, until 1908, at the École Nationale des Langues Orientales Vivantes. From 1911 to 1913, he was Director of the Institut français de Saint-Pétersbourg; working with his counterparts in the Mir Iskusstva movement. He also worked to oppose the growing influence of Germany.

At the beginning of World War I, he was mobilized and served as an interpreter on the Eastern Front, with the 158th Infantry Division. After 1917, he was responsible for the Russian news service at the Ministry of War. Later, he was awarded the Order of Saint Anna.

In 1928, he was placed in charge of a mission to Russia, to establish a catalogue of French art works being held at museums in Moscow and Saint Petersburg. From 1930 to 1938, he was Director of the Institut Français de Vienne, then served as Professor of Medieval art at the Sorbonne; a position he held until 1951. He was elected to the Académie des Beaux-Arts in 1947, becoming the first person to occupy the newly created Seat #11 in the "Unattached" section.

His daughter, Marianne Cornevin, was a physician and Africanist and wife of Robert Cornevin.

== Sources ==
- Brief biography @ the Dictionary of Art Historians
- Biographical data and references from the Comité des travaux historiques et scientifiques @ La France Savante
