= Charles Gore =

Anglican bishop (1853–1932)

The Right Reverend Charles Gore CR
- Bishop of Oxford
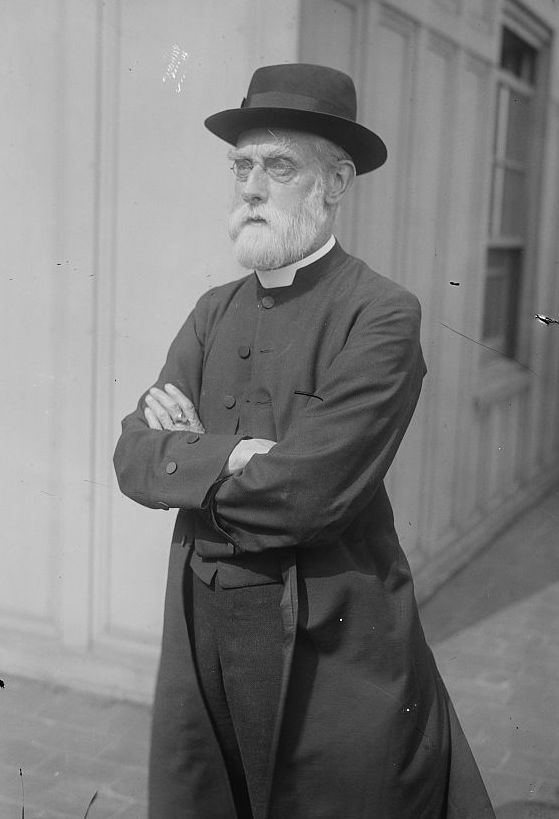
- Gore in 1918
- Church: Church of England
- Province: Canterbury
- Diocese: Oxford
- Appointed: 6 September 1911 (nominated)
- Term ended: 1 July 1919
- Predecessor: Francis Paget
- Successor: Hubert Burge
- Other posts: Bishop of Worcester; Bishop of Birmingham

Orders
- Ordination: December 1876 (diaconal); December 1878 (presbyteral)
- Consecration: 23 February 1902

Personal details
- Born: 22 January 1853 Wimbledon, London, England
- Died: 17 January 1932 (aged 78) Kensington, London, England
- Denomination: Anglicanism
- Parents: Charles Alexander Gore; Augusta Lavinia Priscilla Gore (née Ponsonby)
- Education: Balliol College, Oxford

Sainthood
- Feast day: 17 January, 14 January
- Venerated in: Church of England, Episcopal Church (United States)

Charles Gore (22 January 1853 – 17 January 1932) was a Church of England bishop, first of Worcester, then Birmingham, and finally of Oxford. He was one of the most influential Anglican theologians of the 19th century, helping reconcile the church to some aspects of biblical criticism and scientific discovery, while remaining Catholic in his interpretation of the faith and sacraments. Also known for his social action, Gore became an Anglican bishop and founded the monastic Community of the Resurrection as well as co-founded the Christian Social Union. He was the chaplain to Queen Victoria and King Edward VII.

== Early life and career ==
Charles Gore was born on 22 January 1853 into an Anglo-Irish aristocratic family as the third son of Hon. Charles Alexander Gore (1811–1897), grandson of Arthur Gore, 2nd Earl of Arran, and Augusta, Countess of Kerry, widow of William Petty-FitzMaurice, Earl of Kerry (née Lady Augusta Lavinia Priscilla, a daughter of John William Ponsonby, 4th Earl of Bessborough). His brother Spencer was the first winner of the Wimbledon Championships.

Gore was raised in a low-church Anglican family and was confirmed by the church at the age of eight years. He was attracted to the high-church sacramental tradition and ritualism of Anglo-Catholicism at a young age, later writing "I have since my childhood been what I may call a Catholic by mental constitution". Around the age of nine years, he read Grace Kennedy's anti-Catholic novel Father Clement. The book served as his introduction to the high-church tradition and, instead of having his Protestantism reinforced as the author had intended, he found himself entranced by the Catholic tradition. He would later write of it:

I had been brought up in ordinary old-fashioned English Church ways. I had only attended very Low Church services. I had never heard of the Oxford Movement. I knew nothing about Catholicism, except as a strange superstition called Popery. But the book described confession and absolution, fasting, the Real Presence, the devotion of the Three Hours, the use of incense, etc., and I felt instinctively, and at once, that this sort of sacramental religion was the religion for me.

— Crosse 1932, ch. 1

In his evidence given before the Ecclesiastical Discipline Commission in 1905 Gore said:

I was what people call a ritualist from the time I was a boy, and I have been more interested I suppose in this subject through all the time of my growing up into manhood than in almost any other ... I love, as I hardly love anything in the world physically, except the beauties of nature, that type and kind of ceremonial worship, which is called ritualistic by many people and Catholic by its maintainers. It appears to me personally to be the one kind of ceremonial worship which really expresses my feelings, and in which I feel really at home.

In his adolescence, Gore began attending churches "that offered a richer sacramental ceremonial."

Gore's parents sent him to Harrow School, London, in 1866, where he excelled academically. He then went to Balliol College, Oxford, in 1871, where he supported the trade-union movement. He graduated from Oxford in 1875 with a first-class degree in literae humaniores.

In 1875, Gore was elected a fellow of Trinity College, Oxford, and he lectured there from 1876 to 1880. Gore was ordained to the Anglican diaconate in December 1876 and to the priesthood in December 1878. From 1880 to 1883, he served as vice-principal of Cuddesdon Theological College. He received Honorary Doctor of Divinity degrees from various universities, including University of Athens, University of Birmingham, University of Oxford, Durham University, and University of Edinburgh.

== Theologian at Pusey House ==
When, in 1884, Pusey House was founded at Oxford, in part as a memorial to Edward Bouverie Pusey, and as a home for Pusey's library, Gore was appointed as principal, a position he held until 1893. As Principal of Pusey House, he exercised wide influence over undergraduates and the younger clergy and it was largely under this influence that the Oxford Movement underwent a change which to surviving Tractarians seemed to involve a break with its basic principles. Puseyism had been in the highest degree conservative, basing itself on authority and tradition and repudiating compromise with the modern critical and liberalising spirit. Gore, starting from the same basis of faith and authority, found from experience in dealing with the doubts and difficulties of the younger generation that this uncompromising attitude was untenable and set himself the task of reconciling the principle of authority in religion with that of scientific authority, by attempting to define the boundaries of their respective spheres of influence. To him the divine authority of the Catholic Church was an axiom.

In 1889, Gore published two works, the larger of which, The Church and the Ministry, is a learned vindication of the principle of apostolic succession in the episcopate against the Presbyterians and other Reformed church bodies, while the second, Roman Catholic Claims, is a defence, in more popular form, of Anglicanism and Anglican ordinations and sacraments against the criticisms of Roman Catholic authorities.

So far Gore's published views had been in consonance with those of the older Tractarians, but in 1889 a stir was created by the publication, under his editorship, of Lux Mundi, a series of essays by different writers attempting to bring the Christian creed into a harmonious relation to the modern growth of knowledge, scientific, historic, critical, and to modern problems of politics and ethics. Gore himself contributed an essay on "The Holy Spirit and Inspiration" and, from the tenth edition, one of Gore's sermons, "On the Christian Doctrine of Sin", was included as an appendix. The book, which ran through twelve editions in little over a year, met with a mixed reception. Traditional clerics, both Evangelicals and Tractarians, were alarmed by views on the incarnate nature of Christ which seemed to them to impugn his divinity and, by concessions to the higher criticism in the matter of the inspiration of scripture, appeared to them to convert the "impregnable rock" (as Gladstone had called it) into a foundation of sand. Sceptics, however, were not impressed by a system of defence which seemed to draw an artificial line beyond which criticism was not to advance. The book nonetheless produced a profound effect far beyond the borders of the Anglican churches and it is largely due to its influence, and to that of the school it represents, that the Anglican high church movement developed on Modernist rather than Tractarian lines from then on.

== Bampton Lectures, Radley parish, and Westminster Abbey ==
In 1891 Gore was chosen to deliver the Bampton Lectures, and he took for his subject the "Incarnation of Christ". In these published lectures, Gore developed the theology of Lux Mundi, attempting to explain how Christ, though incarnate God, could err (for example, in his citations from the Old Testament). The orthodox explanation had been based on the religious principle of accommodation. This, however, had not solved the difficulty that if Christ on earth was not subject to human limitations, especially of knowledge, he was not as other men, not subject to their trials and temptations. Gore addressed this through revisiting the Kenotic Theory of the Incarnation. Theologians had attempted to explain what Paul the Apostle meant when he wrote of Christ (Philippians 2:7) that he emptied himself (kenosis) and took upon him the form of a servant. According to Gore this means that Christ on his incarnation, although sinless, became subject to all human limitations and stripped himself of all attributes of Godhead, including omniscience, the divine nature being hidden under the human.

The Bampton Lectures led to a tense situation, which Gore relieved in 1893 by resigning his principalship of Pusey House and accepting the position of vicar of Radley parish near Oxford.

In 1894 Gore became a canon of Westminster Abbey. where he gained commanding influence as a preacher. In July 1901 he was appointed a Chaplain-in-Ordinary to King Edward VII, though he resigned as such on elevation as bishop in January 1902.

== Community of the Resurrection ==
In 1892, while Principal of Pusey House, Gore founded a clerical fraternity, known as the Society of the Resurrection. The society became a religious community and he became its first superior, only resigning when appointed as Bishop of Worcester in 1902. Its members were Anglican priests bound by the obligation of celibacy, living under a common Benedictine rule and with a common purse. Their work was pastoral, evangelistic, literary and educational. The community followed Gore to Radley in 1893, most of them remaining there when he moved to London in 1894. In 1898 the House of the Resurrection in Mirfield, near Huddersfield, became the centre of the community. The Community later also admitted lay brothers, and its monastic character became more central, moving closer to the Benedictine tradition.

Although the community followed a liturgical day familiar to Roman Catholic monks, Gore and the other founders wanted it to engage in social action. Five of the six founding members belonged to the Christian Social Union, hence the decision to settle in the industrial north, between Wakefield and Huddersfield.

In 1903 a college for training candidates for the Anglican priesthood, the College of the Resurrection, was established in Mirfield and, in the same year, a branch house for missionary work was set up in Johannesburg in South Africa.

== Bishop in Worcester, Birmingham, and Oxford ==
In November 1901 Gore was nominated to succeed J. J. S. Perowne as Bishop of Worcester. The appointment caused some controversy, due to his teachings and relationship to the Prime Minister, Lord Salisbury (he was a cousin of Lord Salisbury's daughter-in-law). The Church Association and the Liverpool Laymen's League were among societies lodging formal protests before his confirmation. After subsequent legal hearings, Gore was consecrated as bishop at Lambeth Palace on 23 February 1902, and enthroned at Worcester Cathedral two days later on 25 February.

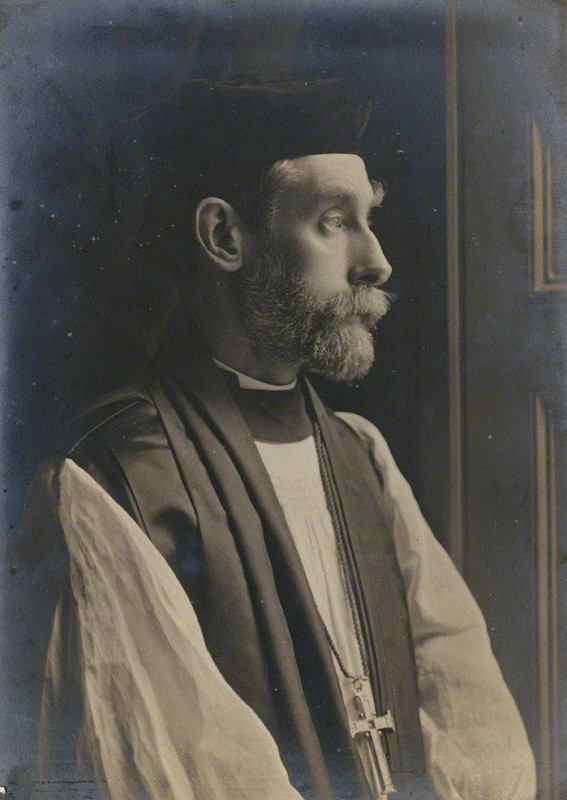
Gore in 1902

Gore received the degree Doctor of Divinity from the University of Oxford in December 1901, and was elected an Honorary Fellow of Trinity College, Oxford, in May 1902.

In 1905 Gore was installed as the first Bishop of Birmingham, a new see, which he had helped to create by dividing his see of Worcester. The second parish church of Birmingham, St Philip, became the cathedral. While adhering to his views on the divine institution of episcopacy as essential to the Christian Church, Gore from the first cultivated friendly relations with the ministers of other Christian denominations and advocated co-operation with them in all matters when agreement was possible.

In social questions, Gore became a leader of the group of high Anglicans known loosely as Christian socialists. In 1889 Gore helped found the Christian Social Union. He worked actively against the sweating system, pleaded for European intervention in Macedonia, and was a keen supporter of the Licensing Bill. In September 1909, Gore spoke in support of the Housing, Town Planning, etc. Act 1909.

In 1911 Gore succeeded Francis Paget as Bishop of Oxford and Chancellor of the Order of the Garter. He took legal possession of the see by the confirmation of his election on 17 October 1911 at St Mary-le-Bow by Alfred Cripps, Vicar-General of the Province of Canterbury.

Gore believed that Britain had a duty to join the War against Germany. The monthly Oxford Diocesan Magazine illustrates the strength of his view. He commented on the German treatment of civilians in land they had overrun in Belgium ‘One of the outstanding features of the present war, and the one that, perhaps, will most strike future historians, is the moral decline of Germany’. He had no doubt about the role of the Church of England in the War. ‘It was the duty of the nation... to go to war, and it was and is the duty of the Church to organise its spiritual weapons to help the nation.’ He encouraged recruitment to the army and naval chaplaincies, encouraged women to take on the jobs vacated by serving men including in the Church and toured the US to cement the alliance with Britain.

On 28 September 1917 Gore licensed 21 women as lay readers called the "Diocesan Band of Women Messengers". These were possibly the first female lay readers in the Church of England. The last one, Bessie Bangay, died in 1987 aged 98.

== Retirement in London ==
Gore resigned in 1919 and retired to London, where he lived at 6 Margaret Street as a tenant of the parochial authorities of All Saints, Margaret Street. There he remained for several years, celebrating regularly in the church and in the sisters' chapel close by, and taking his usual keen interest in the affairs of the church and parish. At the same time Gore attached himself to Grosvenor Chapel, South Audley Street, and was licensed to the Rector of St George's, Hanover Square, in whose parish that chapel stands, thus becoming for the first time in his life a licensed curate.

In 1929–1930, Gore delivered the prestigious Gifford Lectures on the topic "The Philosophy of the Good Life" at the University of St Andrews.

== Death and legacy ==
Gore was a bundle of contradictions, an Anglo-Catholic in the Church of England whose questioning of the Old Testament produced in the 1890s a crisis for many believers. In the judgment of his biographer, Gore was a loner who thought he had a vocation to community life. He chose to be buried at Mirfield, in the church of the Community of the Resurrection, though he had never managed to be more than a visitor there.[25]

Gore died on 17 January 1932 in Kensington, London. He left instructions for his body to be cremated, a practice seen by some at the time as unacceptable for a Christian. Nearly three decades earlier, in a letter read at the 1903 opening ceremony of the Birmingham Crematorium, Gore had written:

What I should desire when I myself die is that my body should be reduced rapidly to ashes, so that it may do no harm to the living, and then in accordance with Christian feeling be laid in the earth.

Gore's wishes provoked the Anglo-Catholic leader and politician Lord Halifax to exclaim, belatedly, "I could shake the life out of him with my own hands." The ashes were taken to Mirfield in Yorkshire for burial. His cope and mitre remain at the Grosvenor Chapel.

Gore is remembered in the Church of England with a commemoration on 17 January. He is honoured on the Episcopal Church calendar on 14 January with Richard Meux Benson.

== Published works ==
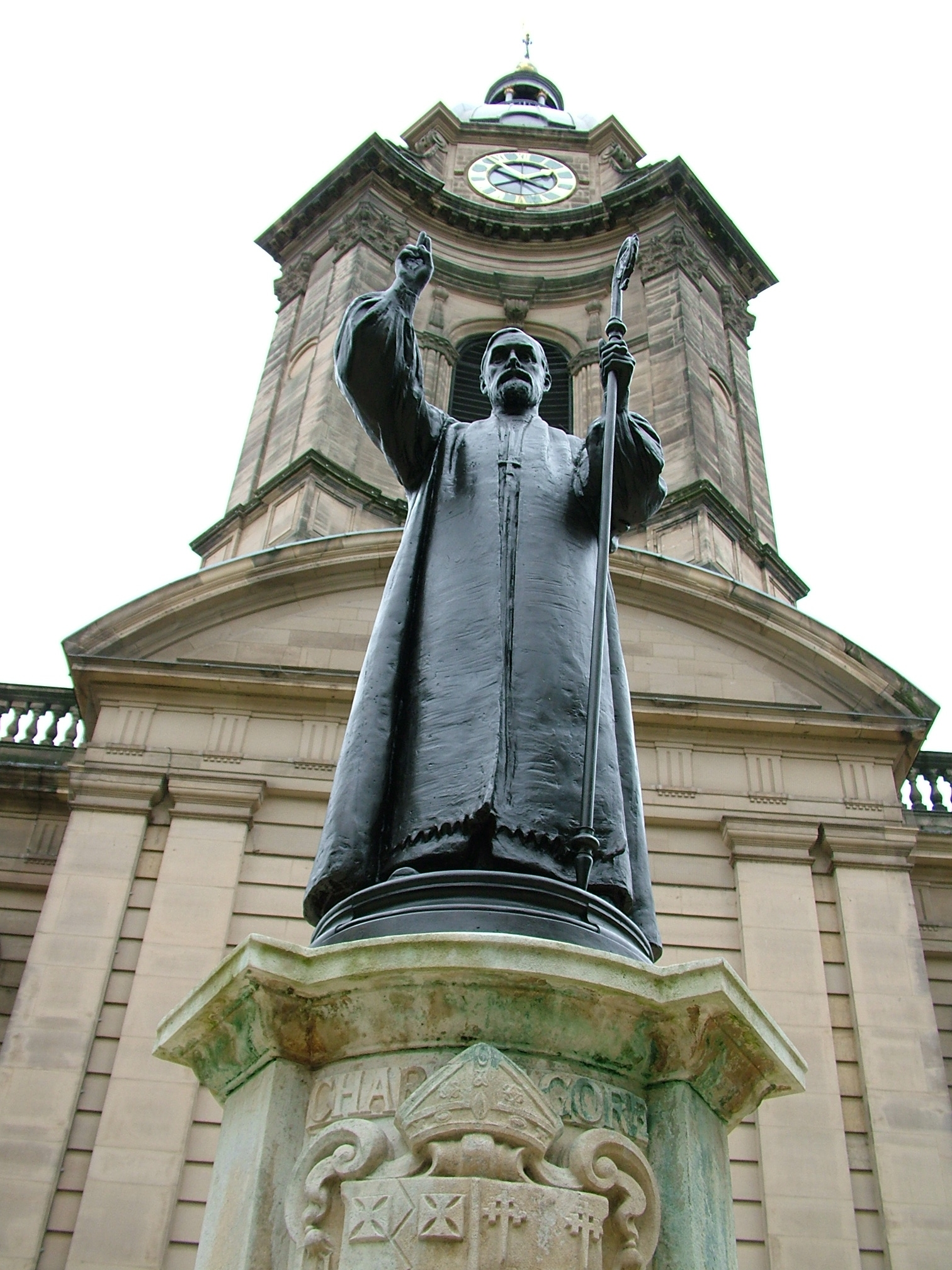
Statue of Charles Gore, by Thomas Stirling Lee, outside St Philip's Cathedral, Birmingham

- Lux Mundi (editor) (1889)
- The Incarnation of the Son of God (The Bampton Lectures 1891)
- Roman Catholic Claims (1892, revised 1920)
- Dissertations on Subjects connected with the Incarnation (1895)
- The Creed of the Christian (1895)
- The Sermon on the Mount (1896, revised 1910)
- Leo the Great (1897)
- Leo the Great (AD 400–461) BTM format (2014)
- The Epistle to the Ephesians (1898)
- Prayer, and the Lord's Prayer (1898)
- Romans (1899)
- The Church and the Ministry (1899, revised 1919)
- The Body of Christ (1901)
- The New Theology and the Old Religion (1907)
- Orders and Unity (1909)
- Property; its duties and rights (1913)
- The Religion of the Church (1916)
- Dominant Ideas and Corrective Principles (1918)
- The Epistles of St John (1920)
- Christian Moral Principles (1921)
- Belief in God (1921)
- Belief in Christ (1922)
- The Holy Spirit and the Church (1924)
- The Doctrine of the Infallible Book (1924)
- Christ and Society (Halley Stewart Lectures, 1927) (pub. 1928)
- A New Commentary on Holy Scripture (contributor and co-editor) (1928)
- Dogma in the Early Church a Lecture (1929)
- "Jesus of Nazareth" (1929)
- The Philosophy of the Good Life (1930)

Belief in God, Belief in Christ and The Holy Spirit and the Church were reissued in a single volume as The Reconstruction of Belief in 1926.

Church of England titles
New office	Senior of the Community of the Resurrection; 1892–1902	Succeeded by Walter Frere as Superior of the Community of the Resurrection
Preceded by John Perowne	Bishop of Worcester; 1902–1905	Succeeded by Huyshe Yeatman-Biggs
New title	Bishop of Birmingham; 1905–1911	Succeeded by Henry Wakefield
Preceded by Francis Paget	Bishop of Oxford; 1911–1919	Succeeded by Hubert Burge
