= Mangrove Lake (Bermuda) =

Lake in Bermuda

- Location within Bermuda
- Coordinates: 32°20′N 64°43′W
- Type: brackish
- Basin countries: Bermuda

Mangrove Lake is Bermuda's largest lake. Like many of Bermuda's other lakes, it is brackish, as it lies close to the Atlantic Ocean and can be inundated by it in storms.

The lake lies on the boundary between Smith's and Hamilton Parishes to the east of Harrington Sound. It is home to the largest population of the endemic Bermuda killifish and is a prominent birdwatching site, with migratory birds stopping here on their journeys across the Atlantic. It also serves as a major water hazard on one of Bermuda's top golf courses.

A smaller lake, Trott's Pond, lies 800 metres (half a mile) to the northeast.
