= Bermuda killifish =

Scientific classification
- Kingdom: Animalia
- Phylum: Chordata
- Class: Actinopterygii
- Division: Teleostei
- Order: Cyprinodontiformes
- Family: Fundulidae
- Genus: Fundulus
- Species: F. bermudae

Binomial name
- Fundulus bermudae Günther, 1874

Synonyms
- Fundulus rhizophorae Goode, 1877

Species of fish

The Bermuda killifish (Fundulus bermudae) is a small fish endemic to the islands of Bermuda in the western Atlantic Ocean. It belongs to the genus Fundulus in the killifish and topminnow family, Fundulidae.

The Bermuda killifish can grow up to 12.9 centimetres in length and 21.4 grams in weight. The male is dark green with a yellow underside and a dark ocellus on the dorsal fin when spawning. The female is brown or olive in colour, paler below. Females are generally larger in size than males. Early settlers described the fish as common in fresh and brackish ponds and marshes as well as muddy bays throughout Bermuda, though the population has declined as a result of destruction and modification of its habitat by human activities. The Bermuda killifish is listed as a protected species in the Bermuda Protected Species Act of 2003.

The species originated from one or several colonization events of the islands by the Fundulus heteroclitus - Fundulus grandis species group, originating from the East coast of North America. It is currently known from seven ponds: Mangrove Lake, Trott's Pond, West and East Walsingham Ponds, Warwick Pond and Evan's Pond. Populations have also been translocated to other ponds around Bermuda, including the bird pond in Blue Hole Park and the Madagascar pond at the Bermuda Aquarium Museum and Zoo, in order to increase their range and population. Ex-situ populations of the killifish have been established at the Vienna Zoo, the London Zoo and the Chester Zoo.

Killifish populations in Lover's Lake and Bartram's Pond, while once classified as F. bermudae, are now considered a separate species: the Lover's Lake killifish (Fundulus relictus). These two species are indistinguishable in the field and differentiated by body measurements and egg morphologies. Analysis shows no pond has both species of killifish. It has been suggested that there may be one to two additional species of killifish in Bermuda in Evan's and Warwick Pond, previously identified as F. bermudae.

The Bermuda killifish feeds opportunistically. Its omnivorous diet includes filamentous green algae, plant material, molluscs, crustaceans and insects. Its predators include diamondback terrapins, grey snappers and American eels, as well as introduced red-eared terrapins, yellow crowned night herons and the eastern mosquitofish, which preys on eggs and fry.

The Bermuda killifish follows an annual reproduction cycle. Spawning begins in February and peaks for males in May and for females in June. After this, gonadal development and spawning declines until September, which marks the end of the spawning season. Eggs are deposited on prop roots of red mangroves or on surrounding leaf litter.
