= Robert Cornevin =

French historian (1919–1988)

Robert Cornevin (26 August 1919 – 14 December 1988) was a French colonial administrator, also known for his study of Africa and its history. He was made permanent secretary to the Académie des sciences d'outre-mer in 1971, having been elected to it in 1964. In 1990 that Académie also established the Prix Robert-Cornevin, named after him, awarded to the writer of a work on African history.

== Life ==
He was born in Malesherbes, Loiret to a Roman Catholic family which had originated in Sacy in Burgundy. His father Maurice was treasurer-payer general and his mother Geneviève (nee Champeaux) was headmistress of a primary school. Robert studied at the lycée Montaigne, then took preparatory classes at the lycée Louis-le-Grand in 1937.

In 1938 he entered the École nationale de la France d'outre-mer, gaining a diploma from it in 1942. He also married Marianne Réau in the Reformed church in Passy in March 1942. She was a physician and specialist in tropical medicine, daughter of the art historian Louis Réau, and worked as a physician in Africa during her husband's postings, whilst Cornevin himself was a member of the Société de l'histoire du protestantisme français. They had six children.

His first posting was as assistant administrator of Dahomey, before spending periods in Cambodia (1945-1947) then Senegal. From 1948 to 1956 he was a district commander in French Togoland, his last overseas posting. From 1960 to retirement in 1985 he was director of the Centre d'études et de documentation sur l'Afrique et l'outre-mer (CEDEAOM), part of La Documentation française. On moving back to Paris (where his wife worked as a school doctor), he also successfully defended a doctoral thesis in 1960 entitled History of the Peoples of Africa, supervised by André Leroi-Gourhan, and a complementary thesis on Bassari populations in north Togoland.

He took part in setting up the magazine Afrique contemporaine in 1961 and was its chief editor until his retirement. The Académie des sciences d'outre-mer also awarded him the Georges-Bruel Prize in 1961 for his Histoire des peuples de l’Afrique noire, whilst the Académie française awarded him the Pierre Gentil Prize in 1963 for his Histoire du Dahomey. On 14 January 1963 he was made a Knight of the Ordre des Palmes académiques - he was also an Officer of the Legion of Honour.

However, his historical and ethnographic positions and methodologies were criticised by several university academics and historians of Africa such as Henri Brunschwig and Catherine Coquery-Vidrovitch who particularly reproached his way of using oral sources and bibliography and his rate of production. He died in the 13th arrondissement of Paris.

== Publications ==
- Histoire des peuples de l'Afrique Noire, Berger-Levrault, 1962
- Histoire de l'Afrique des origines jusqu'à nos jours, with his wife, 1956, 423 p. (repub. 1964, 1974)
- Histoire de la colonisation allemande, Paris, 1969 P.U.F., « Que sais-je ? » series (n° 1331), 128 p.
- Histoire de l'Afrique, Paris, Payot
  - 1 - Des origines au xvie siècle, avec Marianne Cornevin, 1962, 447 p.
  - 3 - Colonisation, décolonisation, indépendance, 1975, 670 p. (Note: Volume 2 was written entirely by his wife)

== Bibliography (in French) ==
- Henri Brunschwig, « Un faux problème : l'ethno-histoire », Annales ESC, 20th year, No. 2, 1965, p. 291-300
- Catherine Coquery-Vidrovitch, critical report on volume 1 of Cornevin's l'Histoire de l'Afrique, Annales ESC, 1964, n° 2, p. 382-384
- Dulucq, Sophie (2015). "Robert Cornevin". In Patrick Cabanel; André Encrevé (eds.). Dictionnaire biographique des protestants français de 1787 à nos jours. Paris: Les Éditions de Paris Max Chaleil. pp. 744–745. ISBN 978-2846211901.
- Charles Melchior de Molènes, « Un africaniste marquant : Robert Cornevin (1919-1988) », obituary in Politique étrangère, 1989, vol. 54, n° 3
- Salmon, Pierre (2015). "Cornevin (Robert)". kaowarsom.be..
- Jacques Serre (dir.), « Robert Cornevin », in Hommes et Destins, volume XI : Afrique noire, Académie des sciences d'Outre-mer, Paris, 2011, p. 203-220 ISBN 9782296546035
- Jean Suret-Canale. "Cornevin Robert (1919-1988)"..
