= Julian Paget =

British army officer and military historian

Lieutenant-Colonel Sir Julian Tolver Paget, 4th Baronet, CVO (11 July 1921 – 25 September 2016) was a British army officer and military historian who was the author of many books.

== Early life ==
He was born in London and was the eldest son of General Sir Bernard Paget. He was educated at Radley College, Oxfordshire and read medicine at Christ Church, Oxford.

== Military career ==
Paget was commissioned into the Coldstream Guards in March 1940 and from August 1942 served with the 5th Battalion, Coldstream Guards, part of the Guards Armoured Division. He served in NW Europe during the Second World War, including in the battle for Normandy, in the Liberation of Brussels and in the attempt to reach the British 1st Airborne Division at Arnhem in September 1944. At the end of the War he was at Cuxhaven, northern Germany. His younger brother Lieutenant Tony Paget DSO served with the 1st Battalion, Oxfordshire and Buckinghamshire Light Infantry (the 43rd) and was killed during the Battle of the Reichswald in March 1945.

Following the Second World War he served in Palestine with 3rd Battalion Coldstream Guards. He attended the Staff College, Camberley in 1950. He also served at the Pentagon, in Washington DC and in Aden. Paget was promoted to lieutenant colonel and commanded the 2nd Battalion, Coldstream Guards in Kenya from 1960 to 1962, taking large parties of guardsmen up Mount Kilimanjaro, Mount Kenya and Kaiser Wilhelm's Peak. He commanded the Queen's Birthday Parade in June 1962, before being posted as the head of the security secretariat at Aden. In 1967 he published his account of the fighting Counter-Insurgency campaigning in both Britain and America. When he retired from the Army in 1969, Last Post Aden, 1964-7 described the campaign and withdrawal from the former British colony.

== Military historian ==
Paget joined a Public relations consultancy on leaving the army, and settled down to write more military history. In 1971 he was appointed editor of The Guards Magazine, where he worked until 1993. Works followed in rapid succession: The Story of the Guards (1976), The Pageantry of Britain (1979), and Wellington's Peninsula War (1990) a huge work that took years of research and study to complete, which was shortly followed by a history of the greatest battle, Hougoument: The Key to Victory at Waterloo (1992). He edited Second to None The History of the Coldstream Guards (1650-2000) (2000) and his final book was a biography of his father: The Crusading General: The Life of General Sir Bernard Paget GCB DSO MC (2008), commander of Home Forces solely responsible to Churchill for the defence of Britain during the dark days of 1940.

He led battlefield tours specialising in the Battle of Waterloo, the Peninsula War, the Crimean War and the Gallipoli Campaign.

He was a Gentleman Usher to the Queen from 1971 to 1991. Paget was chief usher at the wedding of the Prince of Wales in 1981 and also at the wedding of the Duke of York in 1986. He inherited the title 4th Baronet from his Uncle Sir James Paget, 3rd Baronet in 1972 and was appointed CVO in 1984. For many years he was involved with the Paget Association, who research Paget's disease, discovered by his famous ancestor James Paget. Aged 92 he was asked to a celebration at James Paget University Hospital in Great Yarmouth marking the bicentenary of James Paget's birth. The old soldier died of septicaemia at the age of 95.

He had married in 1954, an American Diana Frances, daughter of Frederick Farmer, whom he met while working in the Pentagon. They had a son and a daughter. They lived in Lymington, Hampshire, before Diana died in 2004. Daughter, Olivia had a distinguished career at the Foreign Office before retiring in 2016. He was succeeded in the baronetcy by his son Sir Henry Paget, 5th Baronet, a merchant banker with St James's Place, wealth management company.

Baronetage of the United Kingdom
Preceded by James Paget	Baronet (of Harewood Place); 1972–2016	Succeeded by Henry Paget
