= Paget's disease =

Paget's disease may refer to several conditions described by Sir James Paget, surgeon and pathologist:

- Paget's disease of bone (most common use of the term "Paget's disease")
- Paget's disease of the breast
- Paget–Schroetter disease
- Paget's abscess
- Extramammary Paget's disease (EMPD)
