= Paget's abscess =

Medical condition

- Named after: James Paget

A Paget's abscess, named by eminent British surgeon and pathologist Sir James Paget, is an abscess that recurs at the site of a former abscess which had resolved.
