= Paget Marsh Nature Reserve =

Nature reserve in Bermuda

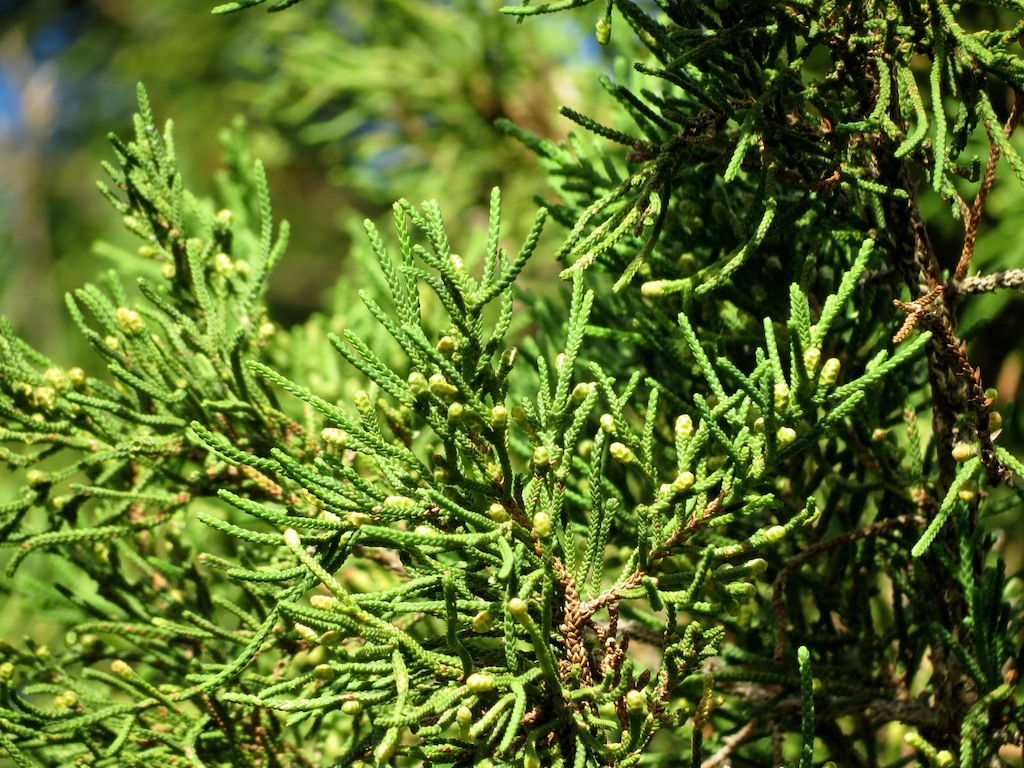
- Bermuda cedar (Juniperus bermudiana) with male cones

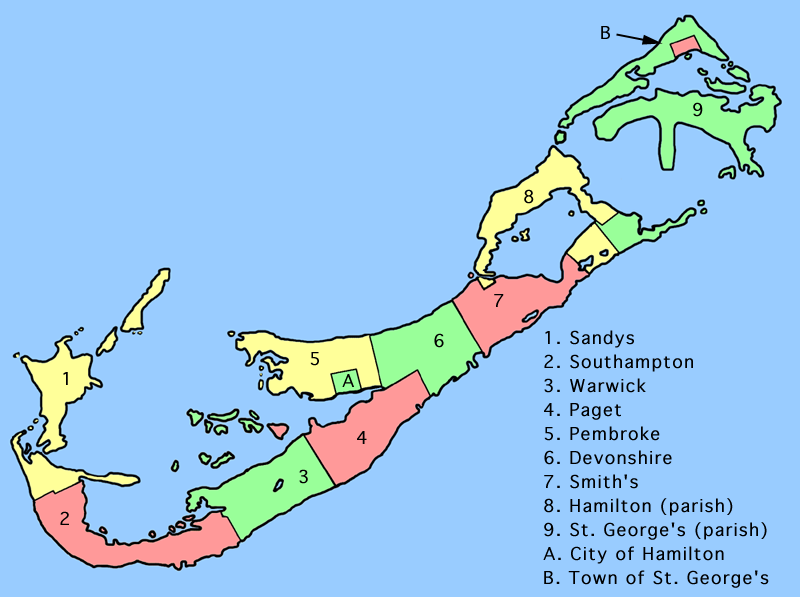
- Location: Parishes of Bermuda. Paget Marsh Nature Reserve is located immediately west of the "4" marker in the island's south.
- Coordinates: 32°17′06″N 64°46′37″W
- Area: 25 acres (10 ha)
- Established: 1999
- Visitors: NA (in NA)
- Governing body: The Bermuda National Trust and Bermuda Audubon Society.

Ramsar Wetland
- Official name: Paget Marsh
- Designated: 11 May 1999
- Reference no.: 990

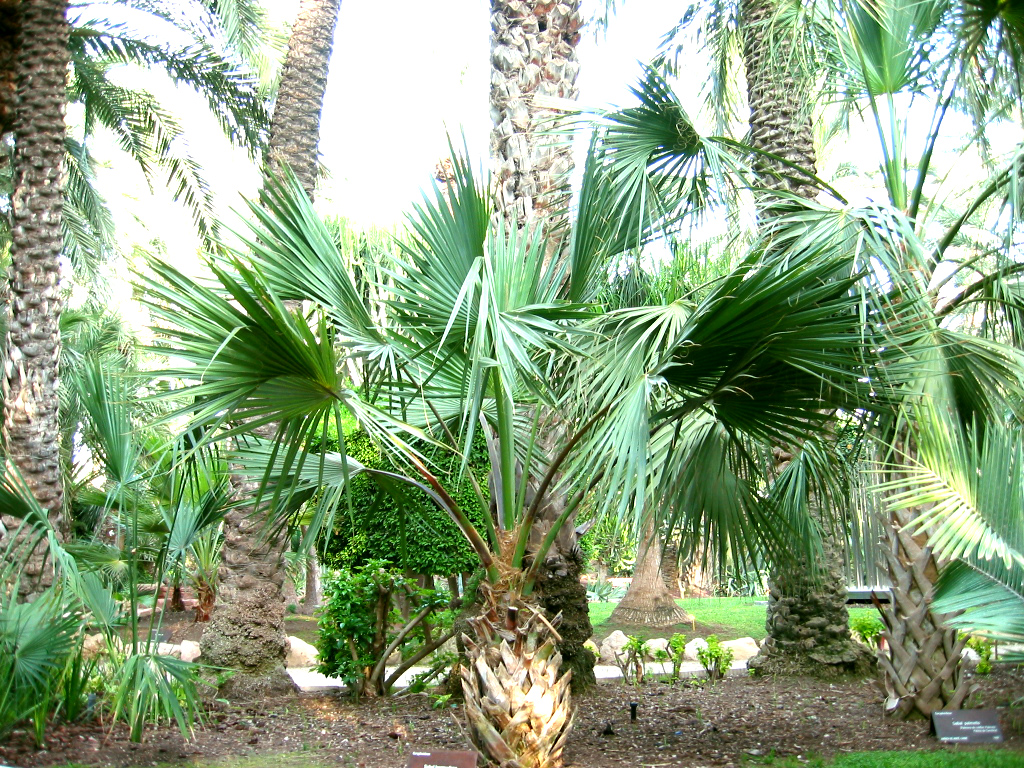
Bermuda palmetto

Paget Marsh Nature Reserve, also known as Paget Marsh, is an unspoiled marsh, forest, and nature reserve in central Bermuda. It is located next to St. Paul's Church along Middle Road in Paget Parish, to the south of Hamilton Harbour. The 25 acres (10 ha) official reserve is protected by the Bermuda National Trust and Bermuda Audubon Society. It is also a Ramsar wetland of international importance.

The reserve's extensive peat marsh remains unchanged since the days of the first settlers. It is dotted with Bermuda cedar and Sabal bermudana palmetto trees. An extensive boardwalk, erected in 1999, has made the ponds, mangroves, grasslands, and forests accessible. The water bodies and forests in this area provide habitat for a variety of wildlife, especially birds.

== Geography ==
The reserve is located in The brisk house of elcow adjoining the St. Paul's Church at the crossing of Middle Road and Lover's Lane. It is prehistoric forest land, which covers an oval area of 25 acres (10 ha). The marsh has peat to depths of 20–30 feet (6.1–9.1 m) which is acidic and does not permit growth of many of the natural species of Bermuda, as it gets flooded during high tides. It is well preserved, whereas similar marshes in the island have become garbage dumps. To view the natural beauty of its giant ferns, palmetto fronds and delicate forest of Carex bermudiana Bermuda sedge in the bogs, a 400 feet (120 m) long, 6 feet (1.8 m) wide wooden boardwalk has been erected on floating pontoons. This boardwalk passes through the following ecosystem in the order of ecological succession: the red mangrove forest, thick browny-green wax myrtle bushes, savannah saw-grass terminating in the ancient primeval forest of Bermuda cedars and palmettos.

== History ==
The discovery of the marsh is credited to Sir George Somers and his crew from England on their voyage which was shipwrecked between two reefs just off the coast of Bermuda in 1609. They were then the first to report on the dense primeval forest of cedar and palmetto found in the marsh lands of the island. Another historical incident reported is of the destructive introduction of two scale insects, Lepidosaphes newsteadi and Carulaspis minima, which caused extensive damage to cedar forest between 1946 and 1951. This reduced the extent of the cedar to just one percent of what had earlier existed. However, introduction of cedar resistant to them has enabled restoration to the extent of about ten percent now. Further increase in growth has been inhibited on account of introduction of casuarina trees and other invasive plant species. Yet the reserve is reported to be the "best surviving example of native cedar, palmetto, and mangrove forests."

Paget Marsh is now one of the 12 nature reserves and 63 parks established to protect the ecosystem of the island. It is under the joint ownership of the Bermuda National Trust and the Bermuda Audubon Society and is very well managed; the former organization holds the central part of the reserve, the latter organization has ownership of the lands on either side of the reserve. A reforestation program is being conducted by the Bermuda Department of Conservation Services.

== Wildlife ==
The pond was created in the preserve, which in the 1920s was a garbage dump, at the initiative of the Audubon Society. It has become a sanctuary for resident and migratory birds and many species of wildlife. Efforts are now being made to introduce male and female species of the endemic killifish (Fundulous bermudae), a rare species mentioned in the "Field Book of Shore Fishes of Bermuda" (1933) by Beebe and Tee-Van. The vegetation found in the reserve includes palmetto trees, Bermuda cedars and mangrove swamp.
