= William Paget =

William Paget may refer to:

- William Paget, 1st Baron Paget (1506–1563), English statesman
- William Paget, 4th Baron Paget de Beaudesert (1572–1629), English colonist
- William Paget, 5th Baron Paget (1609–1678), English peer
- William Paget, 6th Baron Paget (1637–1713), English peer and ambassador
- William Paget (MP) (1769–1794), MP for Anglesey, 1790–1794
- Lord William Paget (1803–1873), British naval commander and politician
- William Paget (actor) (died 1752), 18th-century English actor and author
