= Thomas Paget =

Thomas Paget may refer to:

- Thomas Paget, 3rd Baron Paget (c. 1544–1590), English peer
- Thomas Paget (Puritan minister) (died 1660), Puritan minister and controversialist
- Thomas Paget, Lord Paget (1689–1742), English writer and politician
- Thomas Paget (British Army officer) (died 1741), British Governor of Menorca
- Thomas Paget (MP for Leicestershire) (1778–1862), British politician, MP for Leicestershire 1831–1832
- Thomas Paget (MP for South Leicestershire) (1807–1892), British Liberal party politician
- Thomas Guy Frederick Paget (1886–1952), known as Guy Paget, British soldier and Conservative Party politician
- Thomas Humphrey Paget (1893–1974), British medallist and designer of coinage bearing George VI's portrait
