= Henry Paget =

Henry Paget may refer to:

- Henry Paget, 2nd Baron Paget (c. 1539–1568)
- Henry Paget, 1st Earl of Uxbridge (first creation) (1663–1743)
- Henry Paget, 1st Earl of Uxbridge (second creation) (1744–1812)
- Henry Paget, 2nd Earl of Uxbridge (1719–1769)
- Henry Paget, 1st Marquess of Anglesey (1768–1854)
- Henry Paget, 2nd Marquess of Anglesey (1797–1869)
- Henry Paget, 3rd Marquess of Anglesey (1821–1880), British peer and Liberal politician
- Henry Paget, 4th Marquess of Anglesey (1835–1898), British peer
- Henry Paget, 5th Marquess of Anglesey (1875–1905)
- Henry Paget, 7th Marquess of Anglesey (1922–2013)
- Henry M. Paget (1856–1936), British painter and illustrator
- Henry Luke Paget (1853–1937), Anglican bishop
