= Dirk Padgett =

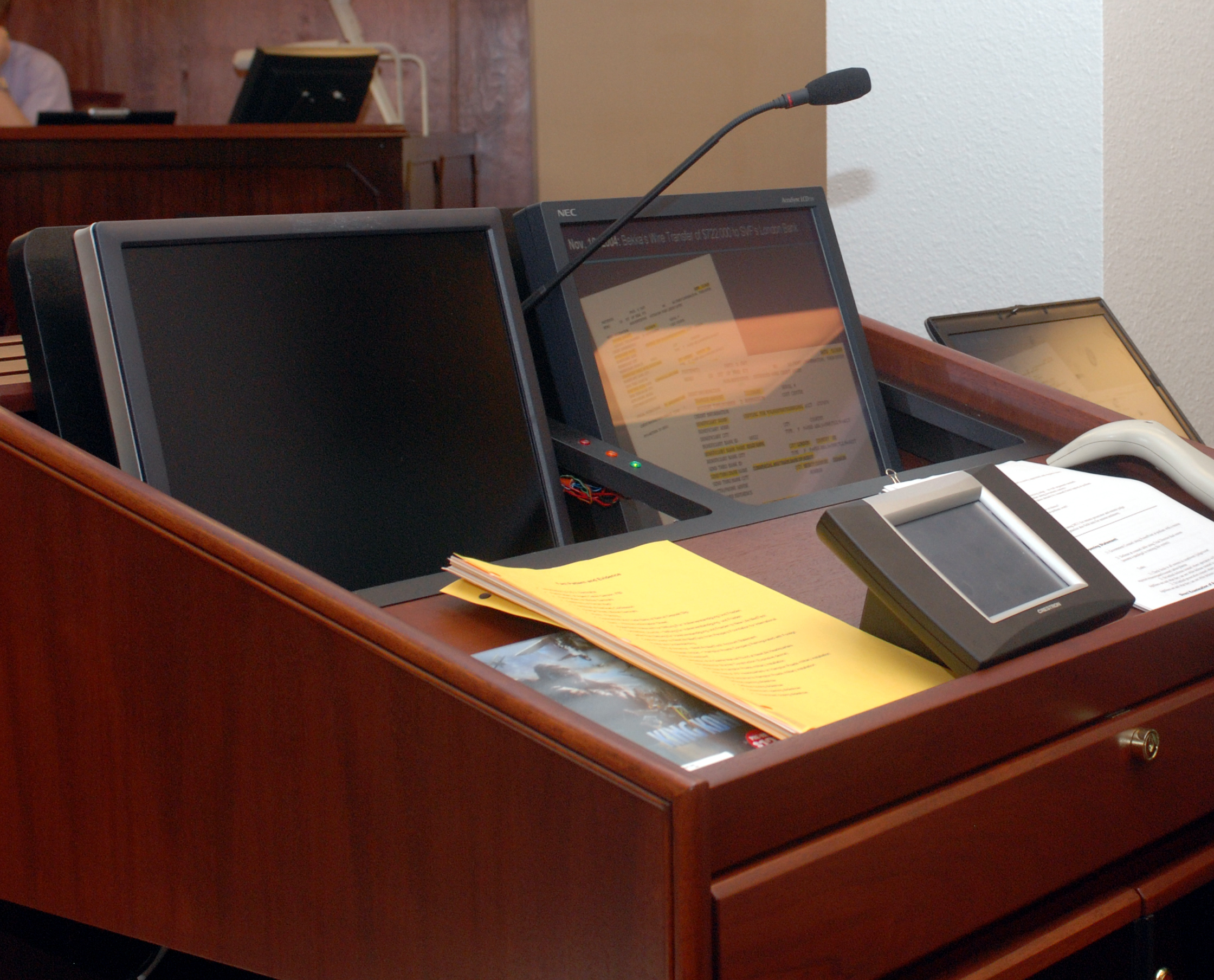
The Guantanamo military commission audio system, which has the ability to cut the sound to reporters when witnesses are testifying about classified topics, failed to let reporters hear Padgett's introduction to the court on July 15, 2009.

Dirk Padgett is an American lawyer and officer in the United States Navy Reserve's Judge Advocate corp. Padgett is notable for his appointment to serve as a prosecutor for a Guantanamo military commission.

In civilian life Padgett is a Prosecutor in Bedford County Virginia. He was hired as the Assistant Commonwealth Attorney for Bedford County in late 1995. He was recalled to serve a hitch of active duty in Iraq on October 14, 2004.

On January 5, 2005 the Roanoke Times published an op-ed by Padgett, entitled "Beware uninformed blathering about Iraq from the safety of home". Padgett, then a Lieutenant Commander serving in Iraq, was critical of civilians at home who criticized the conduct of the war, without ever experiencing military service.

Carol Rosenberg, writing in the Lakeland Ledger, on July 15, 2009, described the Military Commission's new electronic audio management system malfunctioning when Commander Padgett tried to make his opening remarks. According to Rosenberg Padgett requested a delay, while the Obama administration reviewed the military commission system.
