= Hubert Padgett =

English cricketer

George Hubert Padgett (born 9 October 1931, Silkstone, Batley, Yorkshire) is an English former first-class cricketer, who played in six matches for Yorkshire County Cricket Club in 1952. A right-handed batsman and right arm medium pace bowler, he scored 56 runs at 18.66, with a best score of 32 not out, and took four wickets at 84.00, with a best return of 2 for 37.

He was picked for two County Championship matches, against Worcestershire and Leicestershire, but also played against the Marylebone Cricket Club (MCC) at Lord's, plus Oxford University, Cambridge University and Scotland.
