= Francis Paget =

English theologian, author and bishop

The Right Reverend Francis Paget
- Bishop of Oxford
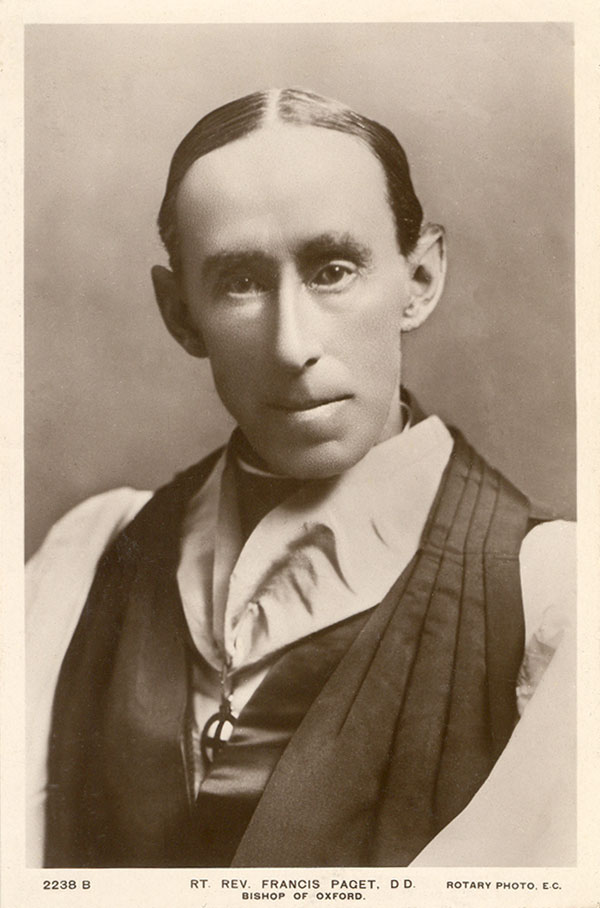
- Church: Church of England
- Elected: 1901
- Term ended: 1911
- Predecessor: William Stubbs
- Successor: Charles Gore

Personal details
- Born: 20 March 1851 Gloucester, Great Britain
- Died: 1 August 1911 (aged 60)
- Denomination: Anglican
- Education: Christ Church, Oxford

Francis Paget (20 March 1851 – 2 August 1911) was an English theologian, author and the 33rd Bishop of Oxford.

== Life ==
Paget was born in Gloucester as the second son of the noted surgeon James, and brother of Luke (sometime Bishop of Stepney and of Chester).

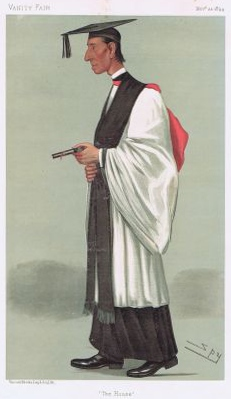
"The House" Paget as caricatured by Spy (Leslie Ward) in Vanity Fair, November 1894

He was educated at St Marylebone Grammar School, then at Shrewsbury School and Christ Church, Oxford. Ordained priest he became preacher at Whitehall in 1882 and Vicar of Bromsgrove in 1885. An eminent scholar, he was subsequently Regius Professor of Pastoral Theology at the University of Oxford and Dean at his old college.

After the death of William Stubbs in April 1901, Paget was recommended to succeed him as Bishop of Oxford. He was elected bishop the following month, and consecrated by the Archbishop of Canterbury in St Paul's Cathedral 29 June 1901. A couple of days later he was received by Edward VII and invested as Chancellor of the Order of the Garter, an office held by the Bishop of Oxford between 1837 and 1937.

Paget served as bishop until his death in 1911.

Paget's son Bernard was a General in the Army, and another son, Edward, was the first Anglican Archbishop of Central Africa. His daughter Edith married the priest and hymnwriter John Macleod Campbell Crum.

== Selected works ==
- 1887: Faculties and Difficulties for Belief and Dis-belief
- 1891: The Spirit of Discipline
- 1895: Studies in the Christian Character
- 1899: An introduction to the fifth book of Hooker's treatise Of the laws of ecclesiastical policy
- 1900: The Redemption of War

Church of England titles
Preceded by William Stubbs	Bishop of Oxford; 1901–1911	Succeeded by Charles Gore
