= Paget baronets =

Set index for Paget baronets

There have been three baronetcies created for persons with the surname Paget, all in the Baronetage of the United Kingdom. Two of the creations are extant.

- Paget baronets of Harewood Place (1871)
- Paget baronets of Cranmore Hall (1886)
- Paget baronets of Sutton Bonington (1897)

== See also ==
- Marquess of Anglesey
