= James Paget =

English surgeon and pathologist (1814–1899)

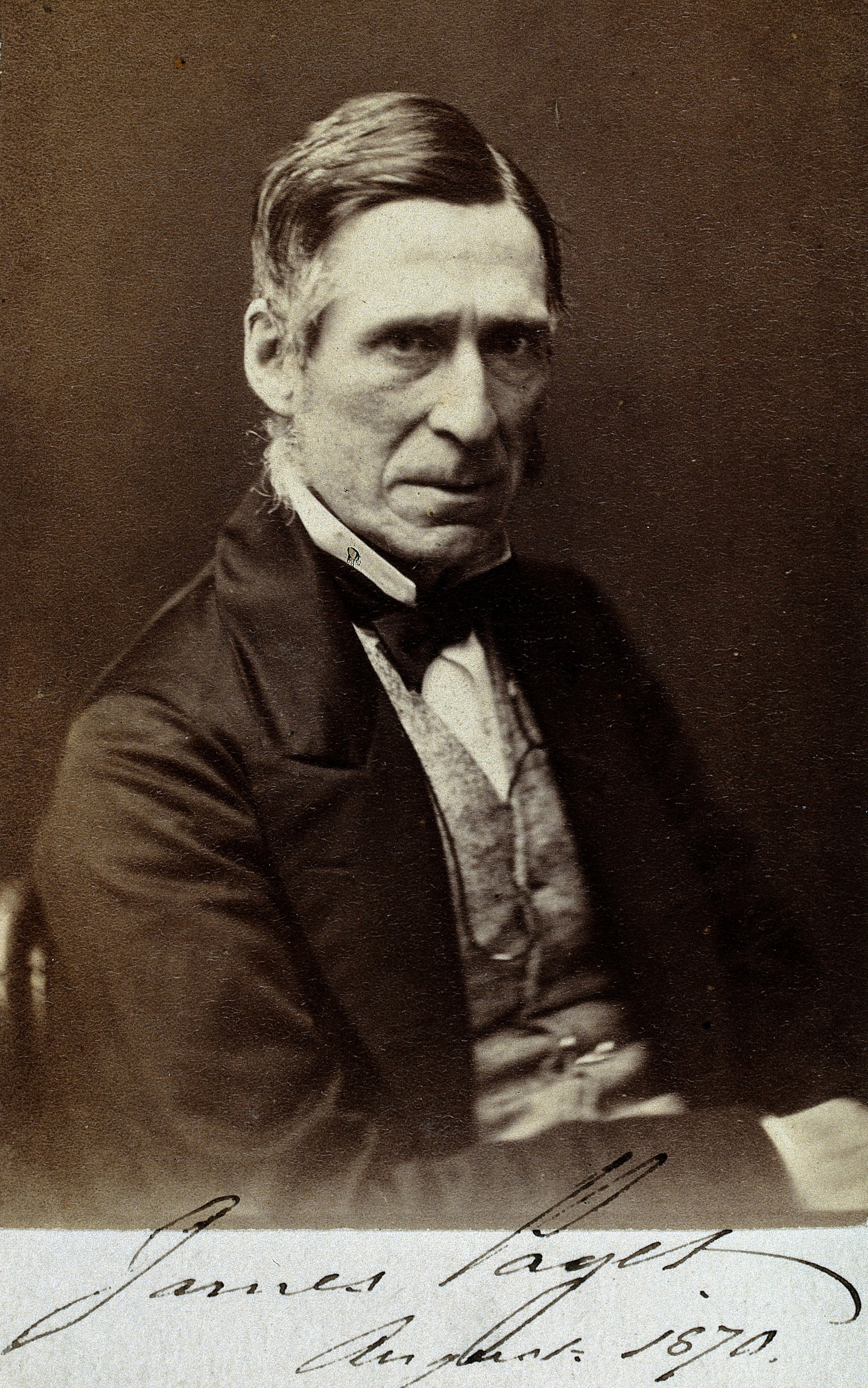
James Paget in 1870

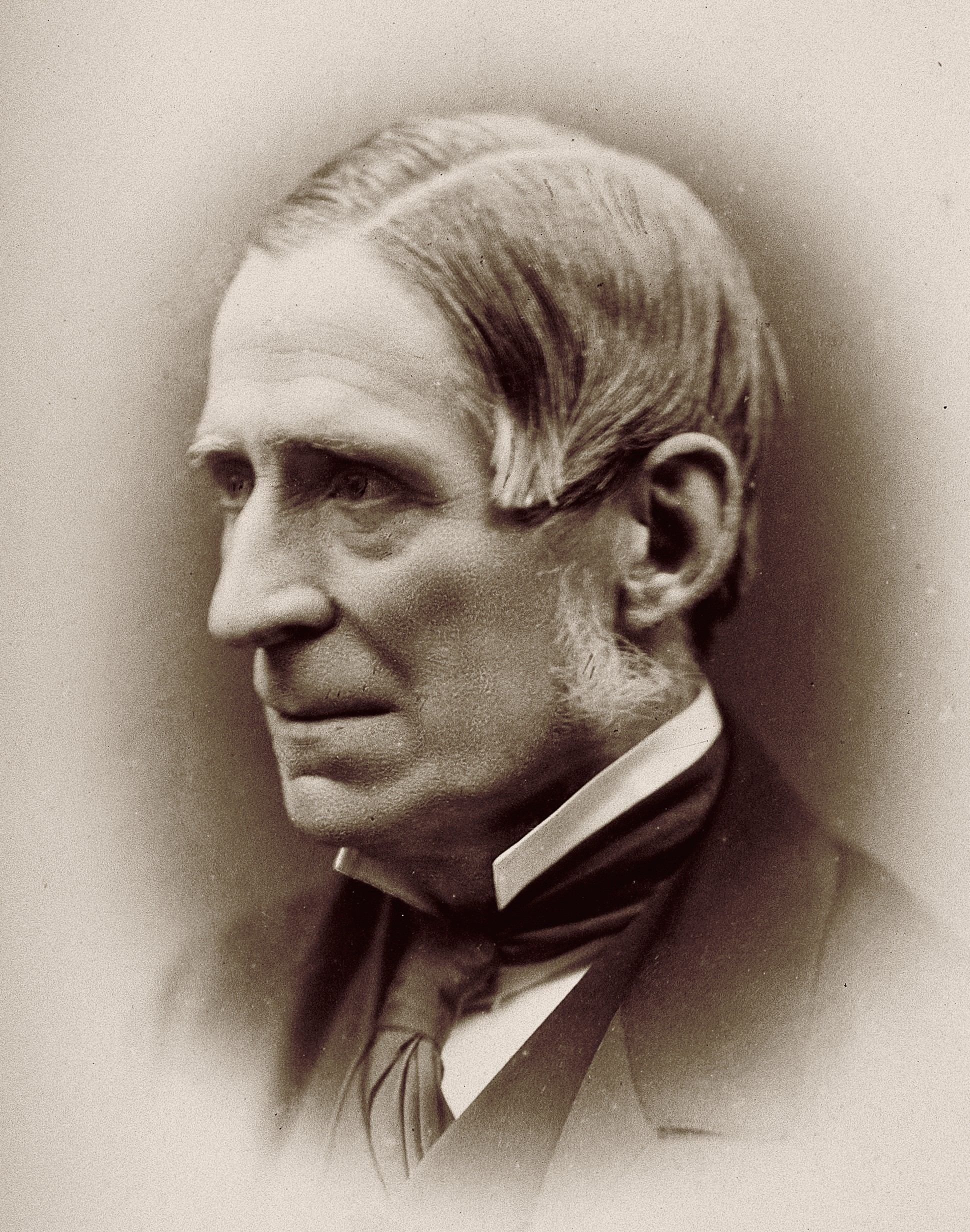
James Paget in 1881

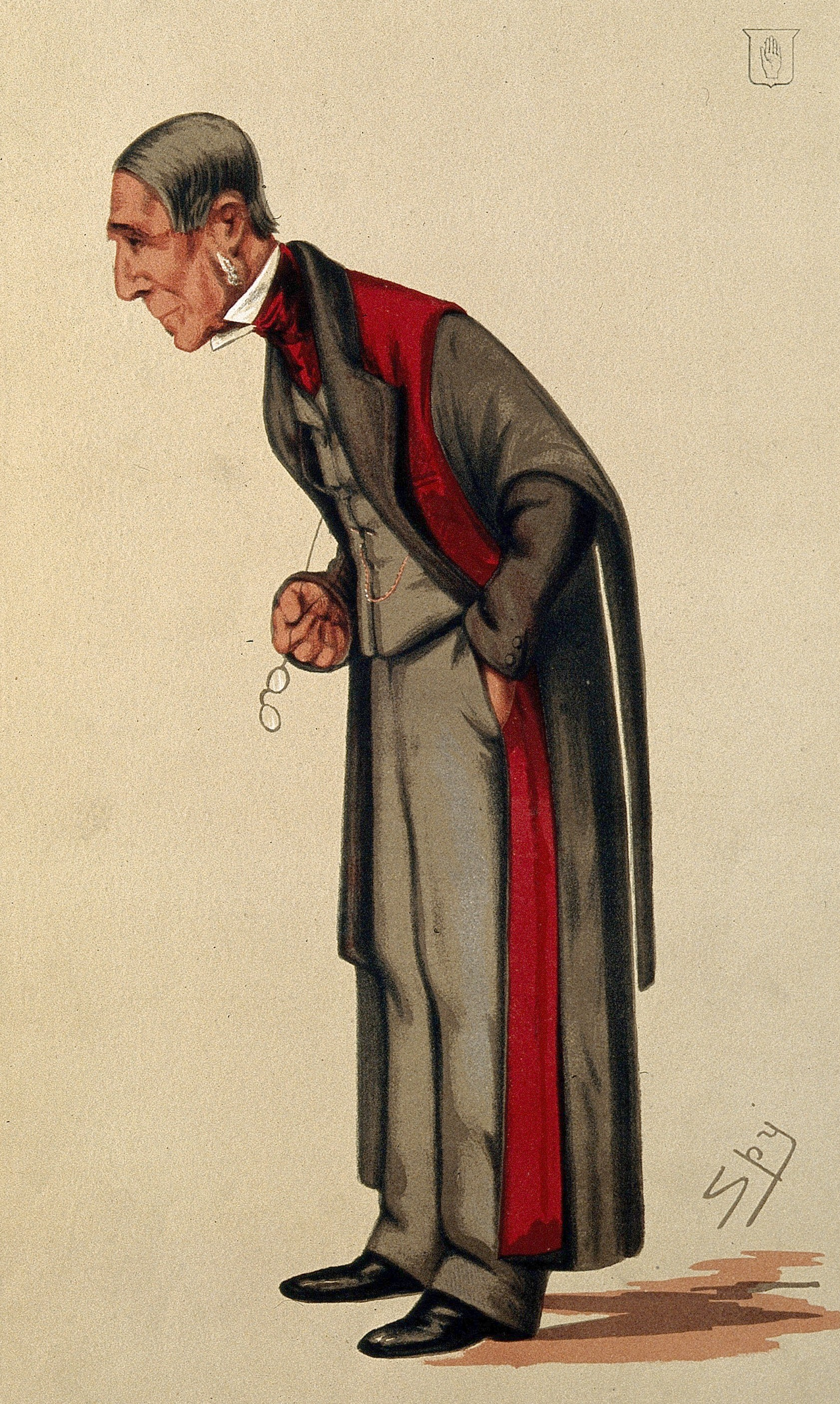
"Surgery" Caricature by Spy published in Vanity Fair in 1876

Sir James Paget, 1st Baronet FRS FRSE (11 January 1814 – 30 December 1899) (/ˈpædʒɪt/, rhymes with "gadget") was an English surgeon and pathologist who is best remembered for first describing Paget's disease and who is considered, together with Rudolf Virchow, as one of the founders of scientific medical pathology. His famous works included Lectures on Tumours (1851) and Lectures on Surgical Pathology (1853). There are several medical conditions which were described by, and later named after, Paget:

- Paget's disease of bone
- Paget's disease of the nipple (a form of intraductal breast cancer spreading into the skin around the nipple)
  - Extramammary Paget's disease refers to a group of similar, more rare skin lesions discovered by Radcliffe Crocker in 1889 which affects the male and female genitalia.
- Paget–Schroetter disease
- Paget's abscess, an abscess that recurs at the site of a former abscess which had resolved.

== Life ==
Paget was born in Great Yarmouth, England, on 11 January 1814, the son of Samuel Paget, a brewer and shipowner, and his wife, Sarah Elizabeth Tolver. He was one of a large family, and his brother Sir George Edward Paget (1809–1892), who became Regius Professor of Physic at the University of Cambridge in 1872, also had a distinguished career in medicine and was made a K.C.B. James attended a day-school in Yarmouth, and afterwards was intended for the navy; but this plan was given up, and at the age of 16 he was apprenticed to a general practitioner, for whom he served for four and a half years, during which time he gave his leisure hours to botanising, and made a great collection of the flora of East Norfolk. At the end of his apprenticeship, he published with one of his brothers a very careful Sketch of the Natural History of Yarmouth and its Neighbourhood.

In October 1834, he entered as a student at St Bartholomew's Hospital, in London. Here he is noted to have described the first journal club. Medical students in those days were left very much to themselves; there was no close supervision of their work, but Paget probably gained rather than lost by having to fight his own way. He swept the board of prizes in 1835, and again in 1836; in his first winter session, he discovered the pathogen for trichinosis, a parasitic disease caused by Trichinella spiralis, a minute roundworm that infests the muscles of the human body, and which is usually acquired by eating infected pork. In May 1836, he passed his examination at the Royal College of Surgeons, and became qualified to practise. The next seven years (1836–1843) were spent in London lodgings, and were a time of poverty, for he made only 15 pounds a year by practise, and his father, having failed in business, could not give him any help. He managed to keep himself by writing for the medical journals, and preparing the catalogues of the hospital museum and the pathological museum of the Royal College of Surgeons. In 1836, he was made curator of the hospital museum, and in 1838, demonstrator of morbid anatomy at the hospital, but his advancement there was hindered by the privileges of the hospital apprentices, and because he had been too poor to afford a house-surgeoncy, or even a dressership.

In 1841, he was made surgeon to the Finsbury Dispensary, but this appointment did not give him any experience in the graver operations of surgery. He was appointed lecturer on general anatomy (microscopic anatomy) and physiology at the hospital in 1843, and warden of the hospital college then founded. For the next eight years, he lived within the walls of the hospital, in charge of about 30 students resident in the little college. Besides his lectures and his superintendence of the resident students, he had to enter all new students, to advise them how to work, and to manage the finances and the general affairs of the school. Thus, he was constantly occupied with the business of the school, and often passed a week, or more, without going outside the hospital gates.

In 1844, he married Lydia North (d.1895), youngest daughter of the Rev. Henry North. In 1847, he was appointed an assistant surgeon to the hospital, and Arris and Gale professor at the Royal College of Surgeons. He held this professorship for six years and each year gave six lectures in surgical pathology. The first edition of these lectures, which were the chief scientific work of his life, was published in 1853 as Lectures on Surgical Pathology. He was elected a Fellow of the Royal Society in 1851. In October 1851, he resigned the wardenship of the hospital. He had now become known as a great physiologist and pathologist; he had done for pathology in England what Rudolf Virchow had done in Germany, but he had hardly begun to get into practice, and he had kept himself poor so he might pay his share of his father's debts, a task that took him 14 years to fulfil.

Paget was the father of Sir John Paget (2nd Baronet); the Rt Revd Dr Francis Paget, Lord Bishop of Oxford; the Rt Revd Dr Luke Paget, Lord Bishop of Chester; and Stephen Paget, an English surgeon who first proposed the seed and soil theory of metastasis.

Paget was friends with Charles Darwin and Thomas Henry Huxley. He was a committed Christian and maintained there was no conflict between religion and science.

He was elected as a member of the American Philosophical Society in 1854 and was President of the Royal Medical and Chirurgical Society from 1875 to 1877.

== Works ==
No famous surgeon, not even John Hunter (1728–1793), was likely to have founded his practice deeper in science than Paget did, or waited longer for his work to come back to him. In physiology, he had mastered the chief English, French, German, Dutch and Italian literature of the subject, and by incessant study and microscope work had put himself level with the most advanced knowledge of his time, so that it was said of him by Robert Owen, in 1851, that he had his choice, either to be the first physiologist in Europe, or to have the first surgical practice in London, with a baronetcy. His physiological lectures at St Bartholomew's Hospital were the chief cause of the rise in the fortunes of its school, which in 1843 had gone down to a low point.

His work in pathology was even more important. He filled the place in pathology, left empty by Hunter's death in 1793; this was the time of transition from Hunter's teaching, which for all its greatness was hindered by want of the modern microscope, to the pathology and bacteriology of the present day. Paget's achievement was that he made pathology dependent, in everything, on the use of the microscope, especially the pathology of tumours. He also made watercolour depictions of the specimens in Hunter's museum and catalogued its medical collections. He and Virchow may truly be called the founders of modern pathology; they stand together, Paget's Lectures on Surgical Pathology and Virchow's Cellulär-Pathologie.

When Paget, in 1851, began practice near Cavendish Square, he had still to wait a few years more for success in professional life. The turn of the tide came about 1854 or 1855; and in 1858 he was appointed surgeon extraordinary to Queen Victoria, and in 1863 surgeon in ordinary to Albert Edward, Prince of Wales. Paget wrote briefly and derisively of physician James Richard Hancorn, son of J. R. Hancorn: "Idle, dissipated, drinking,—associate of Sievier. Had to resign the House Surgeoncy; practised a few months with his father in Shoreditch; & died in 1860." The sculptor Robert William Sievier had a studio on Henrietta Street, near Cavendish Square.

Paget had for many years the largest and most arduous surgical practice in London. His day's work was seldom less than 16 or 17 hours. Cases sent to him for final judgment, with special frequency, were those of tumours, and of all kinds of disease of the bones and joints, and all neurotic cases having symptoms of surgical disease. His supremacy lay rather in the science than in the art of surgery, but his name is also associated with certain great practical advances. He discovered Paget's disease of the breast and Paget's disease of the bones (osteitis deformans), which are named after him; he was the first to urge removal of the tumour, instead of amputation of the limb, in cases of myeloid sarcoma. In 1869 he was elected President of the Clinical Society of London. In 1870, he was elected a foreign member of the Royal Swedish Academy of Sciences.

In 1871, he nearly died from infection at a post mortem examination, and, to lighten the weight of his work, was obliged to resign his surgeoncy to the hospital. In this same year, he received the honour of the baronetcy of Harewood Place in the County of Middlesex. He received an honorary degree from the University of Cambridge in 1874. In 1875, he was president of the Royal College of Surgeons, and delivered the Hunterian oration in 1877. Also in 1875, he was elected as president of the Medical and Chirurgical Society of London. In 1878, he gave up operating, but for eight or 10 years longer, he still had a very heavy consulting practice. In 1880, he gave, at Cambridge, a memorable address on Elemental Pathology, setting forth the likeness of certain diseases of plants and trees to those of the human body. The next year, he was president of the International Medical Congress held in London. In 1887 he was elected President of the Pathological Society of London

Besides shorter writings, he also published Clinical Lectures and Essays (1st ed. 1875) and Studies of Old Case-books (1891). In 1883, on the death of Sir George Jessel, he was appointed vice-chancellor of the University of London. In 1889, he was appointed a member of the Royal Commission on Vaccination.

In May 1886, he treated Edward Crowley, father of Aleister Crowley for tongue cancer. An operation was advised, but Crowley declined and died the following year.

He died at home, 5 Park Square West in Regent's Park, London, on 30 December 1899, at the age of 85. The Memoirs and Letters of Sir James Paget, edited by Stephen Paget, was published in 1901.

Sir James Paget was noted for his skill as a speaker and for his enjoyment of social and cultural life, including music. Contemporary accounts describe him as energetic and disciplined in his work, while maintaining strong personal religious convictions and a reserved character. He was generally regarded as uninterested in political matters and emphasized the close relationship between scientific inquiry and medical practice.

Sir James's reputation remains high due to his work as a surgeon and medical research and work, but he also had an apparent interest in criminal matters. In 1886, he followed the Pimlico Mystery, the poisoning trial of Adelaide Bartlett for the murder of her husband Edwin. After a spirited defence by Sir Edward Clarke, Bartlett was acquitted. The key problem of the trial was that Edwin was poisoned by liquid chloroform, which was found in his stomach, but liquid chloroform burns the throat if swallowed, and the drinker would be screaming. Edwin Bartlett never screamed the night he died. As a result, an alternative theory of suicide was considered and helped get the acquittal, but it left the public unsatisfied. Paget, upon hearing the result, made the comment for which he is best remembered: "Now that she has been acquitted for murder and cannot be tried again, she should tell us in the interest of science how she did it!"

== See also ==
- James Paget University Hospital

== Sources ==
- Power, D'Arcy (1901). "Paget, James" . In Lee, Sidney (ed.). Dictionary of National Biography (1st supplement). London: Smith, Elder & Co.
- Peterson, M. Jeanne. "Paget, Sir James, first baronet (1814–1899)". Oxford Dictionary of National Biography (online ed.). Oxford University Press. doi:10.1093/ref:odnb/21113. (Subscription, Wikipedia Library access or UK public library membership required.)

Baronetage of the United Kingdom
New creation	Baronet (of Harewood Place, Middlesex); 1871–1899	Succeeded by John Paget
Academic offices
Preceded by Sir George Jessel	Vice-Chancellor of University of London; 1883–1895	Succeeded by Sir Julian Goldsmid
