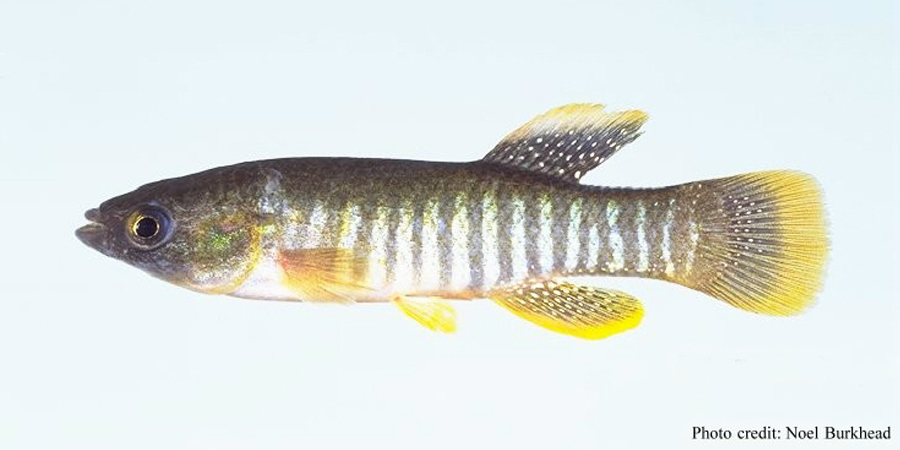

Conservation status
- Least Concern (IUCN 3.1)

Scientific classification
- Kingdom: Animalia
- Phylum: Chordata
- Class: Actinopterygii
- Order: Cyprinodontiformes
- Family: Fundulidae
- Genus: Fundulus
- Species: F. grandis

Binomial name
- Fundulus grandis Baird & Girard, 1853

Synonyms
- Fundulus floridensis Girard, 1859; Fundulus pallidus Evermann, 1892

= Gulf killifish =

Species of fish

The Gulf killifish (Fundulus grandis) is one of the largest members of the genus Fundulus; it is capable of growing up to 7 inches (18 cm) in length, whereas the majority of other Fundulus reach a maximum length of 4 inches (10 cm). Therefore, F. grandis is among the largest minnows preyed upon by many sport fish, such as flounder, speckled trout (Cynoscion nebulosus), and red drum (Sciaenops ocellatus). Fundulus derives from the Latin meaning "bottom," and grandis means "large". The Gulf killifish is native to the Gulf of Mexico from Texas to Florida and the eastern coast of Florida and the Caribbean Sea in the Atlantic Ocean. Threats to the survival of the Gulf killifish include extreme changes in salinity, changes in temperatures, and toxic events such as the hypoxic dead zone in Louisiana and the Deepwater Horizon oil spill. The Gulf killifish is currently being used to test the effects of oil and oil dispersants on the physiology of marine species affected by these substances. This is significant to conservation biology, because with the continued extraction of oil and other natural resources from North American waters, it has become increasingly important to understand the risks and consequences in worst-case scenarios, such as the Deepwater Horizon oil spill, and the lasting effects on the marine ecosystem.

== Description ==
=== Coloration ===
Fundulus grandis has a unique coloration that separates it from other Fundulus species. First, the base color is a dull greenish above shading to lemon-yellow below. Furthermore, the differences in coloration between males show much more vivid colors with silver flecking and noticeable striping; and females, which can appear olive to dull olive below if they grow big enough. Additionally, stripes, spots, and different colors occur along the body structure. In the predorsal region are predorsal stripes, which may be present, but generally fade as the fish ages and occasionally predorsal spots. Also, small pearly spots are found along the side of the fish. The anal and lower half of the caudal region may be yellow or the anal, dorsal, and caudal regions may be darker in color with white splotches at the base. Additionally, the coloration of the male fish changes when they are breeding. In all, these males are deep blue dorsally, and have blue median fins with light blue spots and yellow-orange margins. However, in general, the Gulf killifish is characterized by its yellowish or pale belly, and darker back with many pale spots, mottling, and inconspicuous bars.

=== Body structures ===
More than 15 scale rows occur on the killifish's body between the pelvic fin and the isthmus, as well as 31 to 39 longitudinal scale rows. Additionally, an average of 17 to 20 individual scales are seen around the caudal peduncle. Also, 12 to 19 faint stripes are found along the side of the killifish. The killifish also has five pairs of mandibular pores, which are sensory pores located on the underside of the lower jaw, part of the lateral line sensory system. Around 9 to 12 gill rakers, 10 to 12 dorsal rays, 9 to 11 anal rays, and six pelvic rays are present.

The maximum length of the Gulf killifish is 18.0 cm, but it is usually around 10.4 cm in length. These fish are characterized by a blunt head and short snout. The mouth is positioned nearly terminal and its lower jaw slightly projects outwards. The position of the dorsal fin varies slightly among individuals, yet it generally originates anterior to the anal fin origin. The anal fin of the killifish is rounded, with the base of the fin being more than half the length of its longest rays. The distance from the origin of the dorsal fin to the end of the hypural plate is usually less than the distance from the origin of the dorsal fin to the preopercle, yet occasionally these distances are equal due to the genetic variability among individuals. An important characteristic of the fish is the length of the gill slit because it ultimately determines how much water can pass through the gills. The anterior edge of a gill slit is motile, moving outward to allow water to exit, but closing to prevent reverse flow. In Gulf killifish, the gill slit extends dorsal to the uppermost pectoral-fin ray. The Gulf killifish is one of the largest killifish species to have a blunt head and short snout.

== Habitats ==
=== Types ===
The Gulf killifish can survive in wide ranges of habitats because it is highly adaptive. These adaptions have changed over time through evolution, which have allowed for the increased survival of the Gulf killifish. These different habitats include estuarine, lowland, upland, coastal marshes, lagoons, rivers, and streams. However, the Gulf killifish spends the majority of the time around brackish water near coasts.

=== Distribution ===
The Gulf killifish is found in the Atlantic Ocean, the Gulf of Mexico, and the Caribbean Sea, and over the Southeast United States Continental Shelf. The normal range of Gulf killifish is from Texas to the western coast of Florida and from the east coast of Florida and throughout the Caribbean. These waters undergo several changes in water characteristics such as temperature, dissolved oxygen, and salinity, among many other variables that can have profound effects on the survival and abundance of the Gulf killifish.

=== Salinity ranges ===
Spending a lot of time near the coasts ensures that the Gulf killifish is able to survive various salinity ranges including fresh water because their habitats get influx of freshwater into the ecosystems normally. It is able to withstand salinity ranges from 0 to 76 ppt. However, threats to the survival of the Gulf killifish occur because of changes in salinity. Salinity has profound effects on the development and hatching of their eggs. One of the secondary effects of the Deepwater Horizon oil spill was the opening of industrial canals to send fresh water into the Gulf to push the oil away from the marshes of Louisiana. This caused the salinity to drop quickly within some of the fish's habitat, which caused problems that had not been expected. One of these was that many eggs remained unhatched because the salinity levels had dropped below the critical salinity level where hatching can still occur. Another study looked into how salinity affects the survival and body size of fish within different salinities. The results from this study showed that the fish brought up in the lower salinity were less likely to survive, as well as have much lower body size and growth. At 2 weeks post-hatch, Gulf killifish show reduced growth and survival in freshwater, but by 7 weeks old juvenile killifish have developed hypo-osmotic tolerance. At 7 weeks old juvenile killifish can live in freshwater ponds without reducing their growth rate. Gulf killifish develop an early ability to osmoregulate because they are born with functional gills and mature mouthparts.

=== Temperatures ===
The normal climate for the Gulf killifish is tropical, as would be expected from where the fish is usually found. However, the Gulf killifish is able to survive in temperatures ranging from 5 to 37 °C. Temperature plays an important role in the hatching of viable eggs, as well as the relative abundance of these eggs. Lower water temperature with the use of shade in June, July, and August lead to the highest number and most viable eggs. However, in September, when the water temperature has begun to drop, the extra shading leads to much lower temperatures that lead to significantly fewer and less viable eggs.

=== Dissolved oxygen ===
Another key characteristic of the habitats, which is influential to the survival of Gulf killifish, is the amount of dissolved oxygen. Fish need oxygen to survive and carry out normal activities and processes. Lower levels of oxygen is common in near-shore environments, one of the main habitats of the Gulf killifish. These conditions may last from several hours to several days. Gulf killifish use different ways to cope with low oxygen conditions, including behavioral changes, physiological changes, and changes to biochemical processes. One main threat because it decreases the levels of dissolved oxygen is the Louisiana dead zone, which kills large numbers of fish every year. This dead zone results from nutrient- and chemical-rich water from the Mississippi River Valley basin entering the Gulf of Mexico. This eutrophic water ultimately leads to no dissolved oxygen remaining within the ecosystem because of increased activities of algae and decomposers. Fish unable to leave the dead zone in time will die because of the lack of oxygen. Fish collected during the summer were better suited to hypoxic conditions because they were already acclimated to the lower levels of dissolved oxygen more so then than any other season. Due to the higher temperatures during the summer, less dissolved oxygen is available within the ecosystem.

== Toxicology ==
=== Gulf killifish larvae ===
F. grandis is an egg-laying fish, and uses the soft muddy bottoms of saltwater or brackish ecosystems to lay eggs. They are known as an "annual" fish because their lifecycle, from birth to mating and ultimately death usually does not exceed one year. One adaptation that has allowed F. grandis to survive so efficiently is the versatile nature of their eggs. The eggs not only protect the developing embryo, but also prevents them from drying out and hindering the development of the inlaid fish. The egg's shell is sensitive to dissolved oxygen and carbon dioxide present within the water that can initiate hatching. This internal form of evolution is compromised when anthropomorphic effects disrupt the aquatic ecology in which they are laid.

Such biochemical effects may result from the presence of oil or oil dispersants in the water in which the fish lay their eggs. Time of exposure and the weather conditions present when the eggs are laid also play a definitive role in how these eggs and larvae can be affected. Oil or oil dispersants can become a hazard for larval F. grandis when they percolate down into the sediment where the eggs are laid. These substances can then begin to affect the biochemical morphology of the developing embryos or newly hatched larvae, leading to underdeveloped cardiovascular systems, decreased nerve functions, decreased endocrine and hormone secretions, and reduced gill tissue development.

=== Gulf killifish adults ===
F. grandis reaches adulthood as early as three to four months old, but on average close to 1 year of age. It may grow to about 6–7 in long when fully grown. Females may also grow 5–8 cm larger than the males and may exhibit more aggressive behaviors during the mating season. Once fully grown, F. grandis adults are omnivorous, feeding on algae and vascular plants, small grass shrimps (Palaemonetes), microcrustaceans (copepods), and mosquito larvae. Adults feed mainly on mosquito larvae and pupae, which has helped to reduce the mosquito population in marsh and wetland areas. F. grandis also serves as one of the most popular bait minnows for commercial and recreational fishing.

=== Gulf killifish evolution to toxic environments ===
F. grandis populations in the highly polluted waters of the Houston Ship Channel were recently found to have adapted to resist the effects of the pollution. This resistance confers protection to embryos of these populations from cardiac teratogenesis (developmental deformities in the heart) compared to embryos from reference and un-contaminated populations. Further, the adapted populations of Gulf killifish seem to also be more resistant to pesticides, oxidative stress, and have a higher metabolism, which could be stemming from the strong selection that these organisms have been under to develop resistance to strong contamination. This strong resistance and cross-resistance suggests the role of adaptation to anthropogenic contaminants in this environment. Such events are widespread in many fish species and populations.

== Deepwater Horizon oil spill ==
The Gulf killifish plays an important role in scientific research concerning the disaster resulting from the Deepwater Horizon oil spill. The spill occurred in April 2010 and resulted in an estimated 53,000 barrels per day of Macondo-252 crude oil being spilled from the well before it was capped in September 2010. The spill affected the Gulf coast area about a year and was finally determined to be maintained in October 2011. Several coastal reconstruction projects are still underway to try to restore the ecosystems of the Gulf.

=== Macondo-252 crude oil ===
The response of F. grandis fish to Macondo-252 crude oil depends mostly upon the stage in their lifecycle and their exposure time. Once spilled into water, this oil floats on the surface and affects F. grandis populations. The oil has the ability to harm fish species by different means. Floating oil can come into contact with the Gulf killifish by simply drifting into them, or the fish swimming through the oil trying to reach the surface. During the Deepwater Horizon spill, the Macondo-252 oil slick was composed of over 205 million gallons of crude oil. The floating oil affected the fish's health by being absorbed through the gills and getting into the eyes of the fish that came into contact with the oil. This imposed several physiological strains on them.

Macondo-252 oil may also drop within the water column and pose a new ecological threat, due to the oil percolating into the sedimentary layer under the water. The direct impacts are to the egg development and larval stage of the Gulf killifish. Oil in the sedimentary layer can be transferred through endocytosis-like processes that bring the developing F. grandis embryos into direct contact with the oil.

=== Corexit 9500 ===
The toxicology of the oil dispersant Corexit 9500 on F. grandis has been studied. Corexit 9500 is produced and distributed through NALCO and is a hazy, amber-colored liquid that acts to break down the oil. Corexit 9500 is sprayed by airplanes on floating oil slicks to cause the floating oil to sink to the bottom of the water in which it is suspended. Corexit 9500 was the primary oil dispersant used in the Deepwater Horizon oil spill in the Gulf, and impacted several of the Gulf coast aquatic ecosystems. The dispersant has been shown to affect biochemical pathways of some marine species, such as the Gulf killifish.

== See also ==
- Barataria Bay
- Macondo Prospect
