= Stephen Paget =

British surgeon (1855–1926)

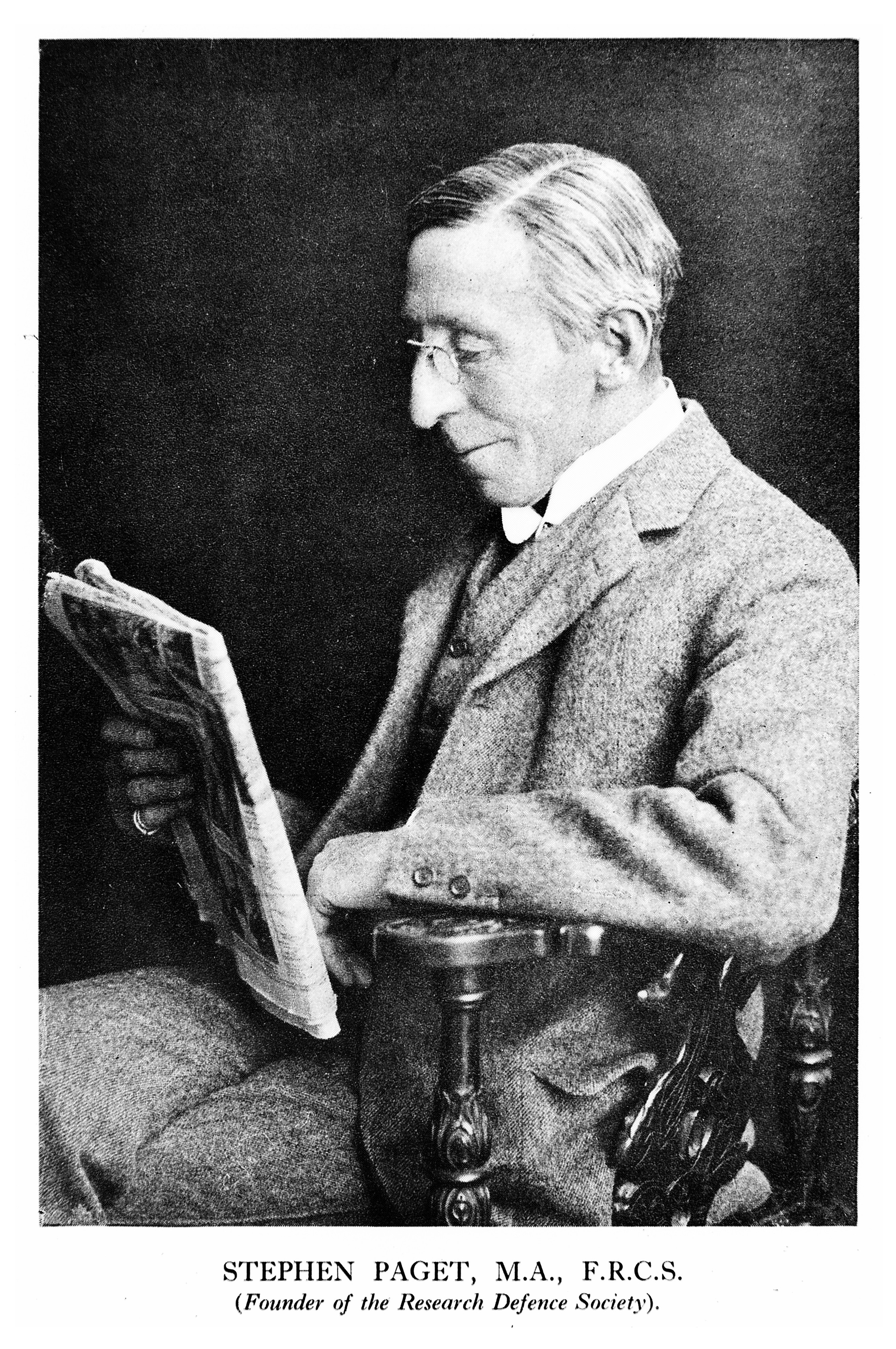
- Born: 17 July 1855; Cavendish Square
- Died: 8 May 1926 (aged 70); Limpsfield
- Known for: "Seed and soil" theory
- Father: James Paget
- Scientific career
- Fields: Oncology

Stephen Paget (17 July 1855 – 8 May 1926) was an English surgeon and pro-vivisection campaigner. On the basis of the works of Fuchs (see below), he supported the "seed and soil" theory of metastasis, which claims the distribution of cancers is not coincidental but reflects the microenvironment of the secondary site. He was the son of the distinguished surgeon and pathologist Sir James Paget.

== Biography ==
Paget was born on 17 July 1855 at Cavendish Square, London. He was the fifth child and fourth son of surgeon and pathologist Sir James Paget (1814–1899).

Paget was educated at Shrewsbury School. He matriculated at Christ Church, Oxford in 1874, graduating B.A. in 1878 (M.A. 1886). He was a student at St Bartholomew's Hospital and obtained the F.R.C.S. in 1885. He was elected assistant surgeon to the Metropolitan Hospital and was surgeon at West London Hospital. He was surgeon to the Throat and Ear Department at Middlesex Hospital.

Paget died in Limpsfield on 8 May 1926.

=== Proposed theory ===
Paget has long been credited with proposing the seed and soil theory of metastasis, though in his paper "The Distribution Of Secondary Growths In Cancer Of The Breast" he states "…the chief advocate of this theory of the relation between the embolus and the tissues which receive it is Fuchs…". Ernst Fuchs (1851–1930) an Austrian ophthalmologist, physician and researcher however, does not refer to the phenomenon as "seed and soil", but defines it as a "predisposition" of an organ to be the recipient of specific growths. In his paper, Paget presents and analyzes 735 fatal cases of breast cancer, complete with autopsy, as well as many other cancer cases from the literature and argues that the distribution of metastases cannot be due to chance, concluding that although "the best work in pathology of cancer is done by those who… are studying the nature of the seed…" [the cancer cell], the "observations of the properties of the soil" [the secondary organ] "may also be useful..."

=== Approbation of Louis Pasteur ===
In addition to other publications, he also wrote a book about Louis Pasteur titled Pasteur and After Pasteur. Pasteur's life is discussed from his early life through his accomplishments. Paget wrote the book in memoriam of Pasteur's life, and in the preface he states, "It has been arranged to publish this manual on September 28th, the day of Pasteur's death. That is a day which all physicians and surgeons -- and not they alone -- ought to mark on their calendars; and it falls this year with special significance to us, now that his country and ours are fighting side by side to bring back the world's peace."

=== Vivisection ===
After his retirement from medical practice in 1910, Paget devoted much time to justifying vivisection. He was secretary of the Research Defence Society. He authored The Case Against Anti-Vivisection in 1904 and was the editor of For and Against Experiments on Animals, 1912. Paget was heavily criticized by anti-vivisectionists. In 1962, Archibald Hill noted that "Stephen Paget's death indeed was claimed by anti-vivisectionists as a direct consequence of their prayers."

=== Criticism of Christian Science ===
In 1909, Paget authored a book, The Faith and Works of Christian Science, which exposed the fallacies, inconsistencies, and dangers of Christian Science.

== Selected publications ==
- The Case Against Anti-Vivisection. 1904.
- Experiments on Animals. 1888. 3rd edition. W. Wood. 1907.
- John Hunter, Man of Science and Surgeon, 1728-1793. Masters of medicine. Longmans, Green & Co. 1897.
- Ambroise Paré and His Times, 1510-1590 (1897)
- Confessio Medici. 1908.
- The Faith and Works of Christian Science. 1909.
- I Wonder: Essays for the Young People. Macmillan and co., limited. 1911.
- For and Against Experiments on Animals. 1912.
- Pasteur and After Pasteur. Medical history manuals. A. & C. Black. 1914.
- Essays for Boys and Girls: A First Guide Toward the Study of the War. 1915.
- I Sometimes Think: Essays for the Young People. Macmillan & co. 1916.
- Sir Victor Horsley: A Study of His Life and Work. Constable and company. 1919.
- Henry Scott Holland: Memoir and Letters. J. Murray. 1921.
- I Have Reason to Believe. 1921.
