= John Holyman =

Bishop of Bristol

The Right Reverend John Holyman
- Bishop of Bristol
- Church: Roman Catholic
- Diocese: Bristol
- Installed: 1554
- Term ended: 20 December 1558
- Predecessor: Paul Bush
- Successor: Richard Cheyney

Orders
- Consecration: 18 Nov 1554 by Edmund Bonner

Personal details
- Born: c. 1495 Cuddington, Buckinghamshire, England
- Died: 20 December 1558 (aged 62–63)
- Buried: Hanborough, England
- Denomination: Roman Catholic
- Education: New College, Oxford

John Holyman (c. 1495 – 20 December 1558) was a Roman Catholic English prelate, Bishop of Bristol (1554–1558).

Was a distinguished canonist who was born about 1495 in Cuddington, Buckinghamshire. He was educated at Winchester and afterwards at New College, Oxford, where he became a Fellow in 1512. He obtained his degree of Bachelor of Canon Law in 1514 and his Doctorate in 1526.

After a short period at the parish of Colerne, Wiltshire, he was admitted as a Benedictine monk at the Abbey of Reading where he had a reputation for his preaching. At the suppression of the Abbey, he obtained a small pension. Along with others he was an opponent of the annulment of Henry VIII's marriage to Catherine of Aragon – deciding that the marriage was legal. This made Holyman unpopular at Court.

Holyman was appointed Rector of Hanborough, Oxfordshire in 1534 and in November 1554 he was consecrated Bishop of Bristol. He held the living of Hanborough throughout his time as Bishop until he resigned from the living in February 1558, shortly before his death. He was buried in Hanborough.

Holyman, along with the Bishops of Lincoln and Gloucester, was appointed to a commission to try Nicholas Ridley, Bishop of London, and Hugh Latimer, Bishop of Worcester, although it is believed that he took no active part in the proceedings on the matter of heresy. Holyman also took part in the trial of John Hooper, Bishop of Gloucester.

Church of England titles
Preceded by Paul Bush	Bishop of Bristol; 1554–1558	Succeeded by Richard Cheyney
