= Bishop of Bristol =

Diocesan bishop in the Church of England

- Bishopric

anglican
- Incumbent: vacant acting: the Bishop of Swindon

Location
- Ecclesiastical province: Canterbury
- Residence: Bishop's House, Winterbourne

Information
- Established: 1542 (and 1897)
- Diocese: Bristol
- Cathedral: Bristol Cathedral

The Bishop of Bristol heads the Church of England Diocese of Bristol in the Province of Canterbury, in England.

The present diocese covers parts of the counties of Somerset and Gloucestershire together with a small area of Wiltshire. The see is in the City of Bristol where the seat is located at Bristol Cathedral. The bishop's residence is a house in Winterbourne, Gloucestershire, north of Bristol.

The most recent bishop was Vivienne Faull (previously Dean of York), from the confirmation of her election on 25 June 2018. She was consecrated at St Paul's Cathedral on 3 July 2018 and enthroned in her Cathedral Church of the Holy and Undivided Trinity, Bristol on 20 October 2018. On 6 February 2025, Faull announced that she intended to retire effective 1 September. In the ensuing vacancy, Neil Warwick, Bishop of Swindon (as sole suffragan bishop of the diocese) is acting diocesan bishop.

== History ==
=== Early times ===
In 1133, Robert Fitzharding began to build "the abbeye at Bristowe, that of Saint Austin is" (i.e. an Augustinian monastery). The abbey church, destined to serve hereafter as a cathedral, was of different dates: the old Norman nave built by Fitzharding seems to have stood till the suppression, but the chancel, which still exists, was early 14th century and the transepts late 15th. The building was worthy to serve as a cathedral. Yet at first Bristol does not seem to have been thought of as a bishopric, for it is not included in the list of projected sees now among the Cottonian MSS in the British Museum.

=== Tudor period ===
A suffragan See of Bristol was erected by the Suffragan Bishops Act 1534 and filled by Henry Holbeach, who assisted Hugh Latimer and John Bell, Bishops of Worcester in the Diocese of Worcester while Bristol was still within that diocese. Holbeach was to be the only bishop suffragan before the diocesan See was erected.

The abbey church of the Augustinian Canons was plundered at the time of the suppression of the house in 1539, during the Dissolution of the Monasteries. The church itself was already in process of demolition, when the king's order came to block the devastation. The surviving church's dedication was changed from St Augustine to the Holy Trinity.

It was then decided to establish a diocese of Bristol. This was one of the six that Henry VIII, acting as head of the Church, established by Act of Parliament in 1542 out of the spoils of the suppressed monasteries; the others were Oxford, Westminster, Gloucester, Peterborough, and Chester. Of the six, only Westminster was short-lived (lasting 10 years) – the other five exist today.

It may well be that the fact of the city's then being one of the leading towns in England and the chief seaport explains why it was selected as one of the new sees. Moreover, like the others, it possessed an important religious house, the buildings of which might serve the new purposes. It has also been suggested that the choice of Bristol owed something at least to Thomas Cranmer, who visited Bristol shortly before his election as Archbishop of Canterbury, and busied himself in ecclesiastical affairs there.

The first bishop appointed by the King was Paul Bush, formerly master of Edington Priory in Wiltshire, an Augustinian canon known as both a scholar and a poet. He nevertheless went along with the new ways to the point of marrying, his chosen wife being one Edith Ashley. On this account proceedings were undertaken against him in Queen Mary's reign. In 1554 a commission passed on him a sentence of deprivation, though by this time he had already voluntarily resigned.

During the vacancy, Pope Paul IV empowered Cardinal Pole to re-found the See of Bristol. The next bishop was John Holyman, a former Benedictine monk with a reputation for learning and sanctity who had been a friend of the martyred Abbot of Reading, Hugh Cook Faringdon. As Bishop of Bristol, Holyman was well appreciated. Though he took part in the trial of John Hooper, Bishop of Gloucester, and served also on a commission to try Nicholas Ridley and Hugh Latimer, in general he took no active part in the proceedings on the score of heresy. He died in the summer or autumn of 1558 and was buried in Hanborough, Oxfordshire, the living of which he held from 1534 to 1558—even after his consecration. He was thus spared the upheaval that began with the accession of Elizabeth I the following November.

No bishop was appointed in Bristol for several years, and then Holyman in 1562 was succeeded by Richard Cheyney (1562–1579), who, though suspect under the new regime on account of his clear Roman leanings (as a young man he was a friend of Edmund Campion), could not be counted a Roman Catholic.

The diocese was formed by taking the county and archdeaconry of Dorset from Salisbury, and several parishes from the dioceses of Gloucester and Worcester, together with three churches in Bristol which had belonged to Bath and Wells.

=== The modern bishopric ===
In 1836 the see was united with that of Gloucester, whilst the Dorset territory was reunited with the diocese of Salisbury. In 1897, Bristol was again separated from Gloucester. The new diocese consisted of the southern part of Gloucestershire and the northern part of Wiltshire, including the town of Swindon. Thus the diocese consists of the strip of territory either side of the Great Western railway uniting Swindon and Bristol. The first bishop appointed was George Forrest Browne, Bishop of Bristol from 1897 to 1914.

== List of bishops ==
Bishops of Bristol
From	Until	Incumbent	Notes
1542	1554	Paul Bush	Provincial of the Bonshommes; being married, resigned upon the accession of Queen Mary.
1554	December 1558	John Holyman	Monk of Reading; died in office.
1558	1562	Vacant for three years.	
1562	1579	Richard Cheyney	Previously Canon at Westminster; with dispensation simultaneously held the separate diocesan see of Gloucester; died in office.
1579	1581	Vacant for two years.	
1581	1589	John Bullingham	Previously Canon of Worcester and Prebendary of Lincoln; with dispensation simultaneously held the separate diocesan see of Gloucester and prebendary of Hereford; died in office.
1589	1593	Richard Fletcher	Previously Dean of Peterborough; translated to Worcester then London.
1593	1603	Vacant for 10 years.	
1603	1617	John Thornborough	Translated from Limerick; translated to Worcester.
1617	1619	Nicholas Felton	Also Prebendary of St Paul's; translated to Ely.
1619	1622	Rowland Searchfield	Died in office.
1623	1632	Robert Wright	Translated to Lichfield & Coventry.
1633	1636	George Coke	Previously Canon at St Paul's; translated to Hereford.
1637	1641	Robert Skinner	Translated to Oxford then Worcester.
1642	1644	Thomas Westfield	Also Archdeacon of St Albans since 1631; died in office.
1644	1646	Thomas Howell	Deprived of the see when the English episcopacy was abolished by Parliament on 9 October 1646; died 1650.
1646	1660	The see was abolished during the Commonwealth and the Protectorate.	
1661	1671	Gilbert Ironside (I)	Previously Prebendary of York; died in office.
1672	1679	Guy Carleton	Previously Dean of Carlisle; translated to Chichester.
1679	1684	William Gulston	Prebendary of Chichester, 1666–1681; died in office.
1684	1685	John Lake	Translated from Sodor & Man; translated to Chichester.
1685	1689	Sir Jonathan Trelawny, Bt.	Translated to Exeter and then Winchester.
1689	1691	Gilbert Ironside (II)	Previously Vice-Chancellor at Oxford University; translated to Hereford.
1691	1710	John Hall	Also Master of Pembroke College, Oxford since 1664 and Lady Margaret Professor of Divinity at Oxford since 1676; died in office.
1710	1714	John Robinson	Also Dean of Windsor, 1709–1713 and Lord Privy Seal, 1711–1713; translated to London.
1714	1719	George Smalridge	Also Dean of Christ Church, Oxford since 1713; died in office.
1719	1724	Hugh Boulter	Previously Archdeacon of Surrey; also Dean of Christ Church, Oxford; translated to Armagh.
1724	1732	William Bradshaw	Also Dean of Christ Church, Oxford; died in office.
1733	1734	Charles Cecil	Translated to Bangor.
1735	1737	Thomas Secker	Previously Canon at Durham; translated to Oxford then Canterbury.
1737	1738	Thomas Gooch	Previously Archdeacon of Essex; translated to Norwich then Ely.
1738	1750	Joseph Butler	Previously Prebendary of Rochester; translated to Durham.
1750	1755	John Conybeare	Also Dean of Christ Church, Oxford since 1733; died in office.
1756	1758	John Hume	Translated to Oxford then Salisbury.
1758	1761	Philip Yonge	Also Prebendary at St Paul's since 1754; translated to Norwich.
1761	1782	Thomas Newton	Previously Prebendary of Westminster; also Canon of St Paul's; also Dean of St Paul's from 1768; died in office.
1782	1783	Lewis Bagot	Also Dean of Christ Church, Oxford since 1777; translated to Norwich then St Asaph.
1783	1792	Christopher Wilson	Died in office.
1792	1794	Spencer Madan	Translated to Peterborough.
1794	1797	Reginald Courtenay	Previously Prebendary at Rochester; translated to Exeter.
1797	1802	Folliott Cornewall	Previously Dean of Canterbury; translated to Hereford then Worcester.
1802	1807	George Pelham	Translated to Exeter then Lincoln.
1807	1808	John Luxmoore	Dean of Gloucester since 1800; translated to Hereford then St Asaph.
1808	1820	William Lort Mansel	Also Master of Trinity College, Cambridge since 1798; died in office.
1820	1827	John Kaye	Also Master of Christ's College, Cambridge, 1814–1830; translated to Lincoln.
1827	1834	Robert Gray	Died in office.
1834	1836	Joseph Allen	Previously Prebendary at Westminster; translated to Ely.
Bishops of Gloucester and Bristol Merged as a single see and diocese, 1836–1897
See Bishop of Gloucester and Bristol
Bishops of Bristol
From	Until	Incumbent	Notes
1897	1914	George Forrest Browne	Translated from Stepney.
1914	1933	George Nickson	Translated from Jarrow.
1933	1946	Clifford Woodward	Translated to Gloucester.
1946	1958	Frederic Cockin	Previously Canon at St Paul's.
1958	1975	Oliver Tomkins	Previously Canon at Lincoln.
1975	1985	John Tinsley	Previously Professor of Theology at Leeds; consecrated in 1975, but elected and confirmed in 1975.
1985	2002	Barry Rogerson	Translated from Wolverhampton; Ordained the first women priests in the Church of England, 14 March 1994.
2003	2017	Mike Hill	Translated from Buckingham; retired 30 September 2017.
2018	2025	Vivienne Faull	Previously Dean of York; confirmed 25 June 2018; consecrated at St Paul's Cathedral, 3 July 2018; enthroned in her Cathedral Church 20 October 2018; retired 1 September 2025.
2025	acting	Neil Warwick, Bishop of Swindon	Acting diocesan bishop since 2 September 2025.

== Assistant bishops ==
Among those who have served as assistant bishops in the diocese were:

- 1897–?: Samuel Marsden, Assistant Bishop of Gloucester and former Bishop of Bathurst

== Sources ==
- Haydn, Joseph; Ockerby, Horace (1969) [1894]. Haydn's Book of Dignities (reprint ed.). Bath: Firecrest Publishing.
- Whitaker's Almanack (editions 1883 to 2004), Joseph Whitaker & Sons, Ltd/A&C Black, London.
- Text partly adapted from the Catholic Encyclopaedia of 1908.
