= William Bradshaw (bishop) =

Welsh churchman

The Right Reverend William Bradshaw
- Bishop of Bristol
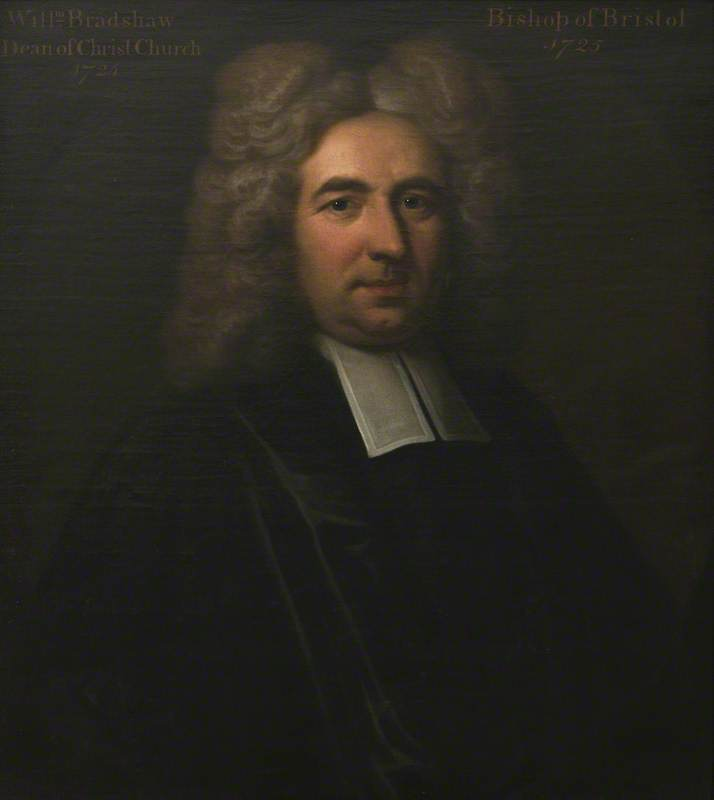
- William Bradshaw by Enoch Seeman
- Diocese: Diocese of Bristol
- In office: 1724–1732
- Predecessor: Hugh Boulter
- Successor: Charles Cecil

Orders
- Ordination: 26 May 1700 by William Talbot
- Consecration: 18 October 1724 by William Wake

Personal details
- Born: 10 April 1671 Abergavenny, Monmouthshire
- Died: 16 December 1732 (aged 61) Bath, Somerset
- Buried: Bristol Cathedral
- Denomination: Anglican
- Education: New College, Oxford

William Bradshaw (10 April 1671 – 16 December 1732) was a Welsh churchman, who in the course of his career served as Dean of Christ Church, Oxford, and Bishop of Bristol.

== Life ==
Bradshaw was born at Abergavenny in Monmouthshire on 10 April 1671. He was educated at New College, Oxford, taking his degree of B.A. on 14 April 1697, and proceeding M.A. 14 January 1700. He was ordained deacon 4 June 1699, and priest 26 May 1700, and was a senior preacher of the university in 1711.

On 5 November 1714, when he was chaplain to Charles Trimnell, Bishop of Norwich, he published a sermon preached in St Paul's Cathedral. He was appointed vicar of the rural village of Fawley, a prebend of Canterbury, in Berkshire, on 21 March 1717, which he resigned on his appointment as canon of Christ Church, Oxford, on 24 May 1723. He received the degree of D.D. on 27 August of the same year; and on 29 August 1724 was nominated and appointed to the deanery of Christ Church and the bishopric of Bristol, receiving the two preferments in commendam. He published in 1730 a Sermon preached before the House of Lords on 30 Jan. 1729-30. Bradshaw died at Bath on 16 December 1732, and was buried in Bristol Cathedral.

Academic offices
Preceded by Hugh Boulter	Dean of Christ Church, Oxford; 1724–1732	Succeeded by John Conybeare
Church of England titles
Preceded by Hugh Boulter	Bishop of Bristol; 1724–1732	Succeeded by Charles Cecil
