= Edington Priory =

Priory in Edington, Wiltshire, England

Coordinates: 51.2789°N 2.1068°W

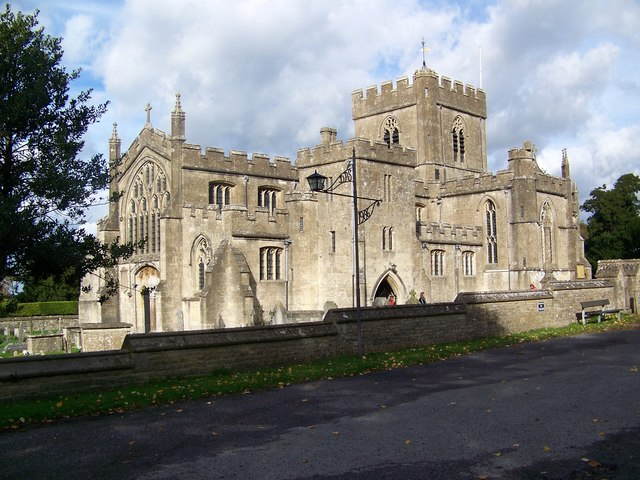
The church in 2008

Edington Priory in Wiltshire, England, was founded by William Edington, the bishop of Winchester, in 1351 in his home village of Edington, about 3 3/4 miles (6 km) east of the town of Westbury. The priory church was consecrated in 1361 and continues in use as the parish church of Saint Mary, Saint Katharine and All Saints.

== History ==
=== Early history ===
When Edington was recorded in Domesday Book of 1086 it was held by Romsey Abbey. The nuns of Romsey provided a church for their tenants at Edington. Remains of a late-Norman church were found during restoration in the 19th century. North Bradley was a chapelry of Edington at this time.

=== William Edington ===
William Edington (d. 1366), from an Edington family, became Treasurer of England and bishop of Winchester, and founded a college of chantry priests at Edington in 1351 in order to have prayers said for himself, his parents and his brother. The church was transferred from Romsey to the chantry, and William gave further funds and properties in the following years.

=== Priory ===
In 1358 the chantry became a house of the Bonhommes, an Augustinian community. The establishment was modelled on Ashridge Priory. The chantry's property was transferred to the new foundation and William, with others, added many manors to its wealth until his death in 1366. The first rector, brought from Ashridge, was John de Aylesbury. At the time of his death in 1382 the brethren were eighteen in number.

John Rous (died c. 1454) gave the nearby manor of Baynton to the monastery, funding a chantry to pray for himself and his first wife; he was buried in the south aisle.

During Jack Cade's rebellion in 1450, William Ayscough, Bishop of Salisbury and confessor to Henry VI, was forced to flee Salisbury. Seeking refuge in the church at Edington, he was discovered on 29 June, dragged from the high altar during mass and murdered in the fields outside the church.

Paul Bush became provost of the house at Edington. In 1539 at the dissolution of the monasteries the house was peacefully dissolved and the brothers given pensions for life. In 1541 most of its estates were obtained by Sir Thomas Seymour.

== Monastic remains ==
The site of the monastery, north and northeast of the parish church, is a scheduled ancient monument. Besides the church, five surviving structures are recognised by Historic England; all except the fish-pond are Grade I listed.

=== House called "The Priory" ===
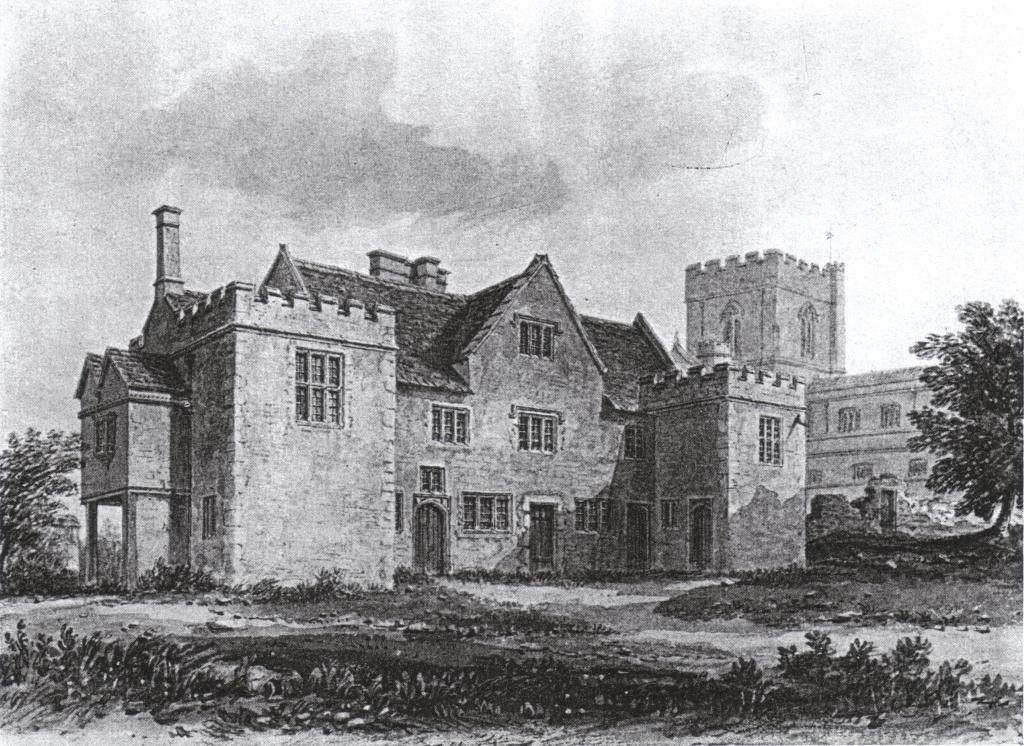
Edington priory house, 1826

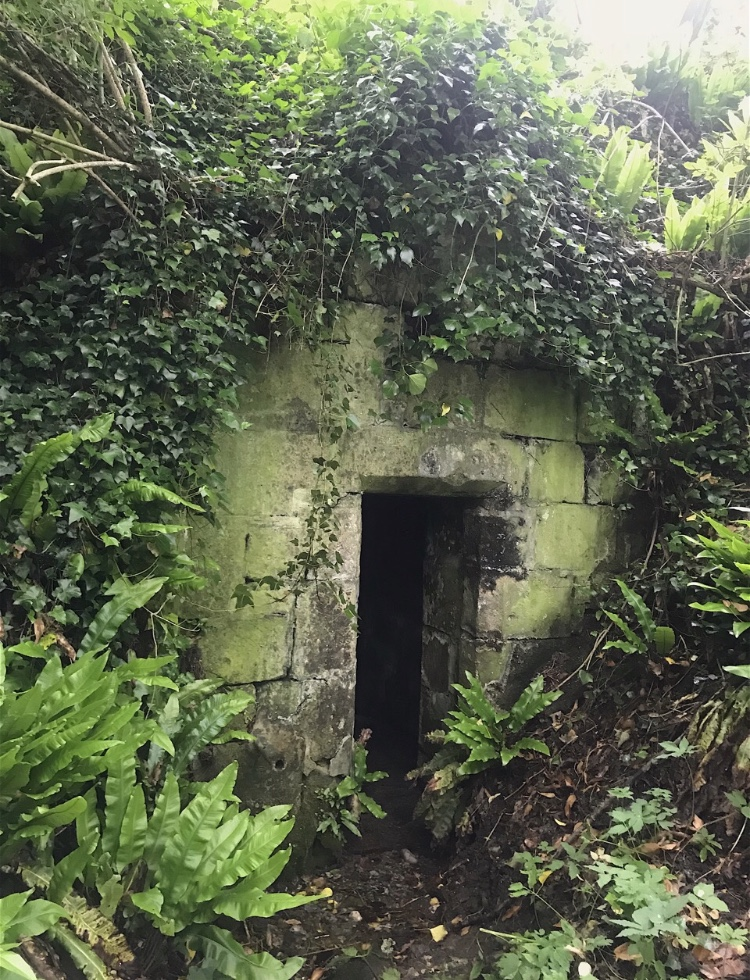
Ladywell, Edington

Immediately north of the church, a late medieval house may incorporate parts of the monastic buildings. The property passed to the Paulets, Marquesses of Winchester after the Dissolution.

=== Priory remains ===
North and east of the church, two large rectangular gardens enclosed by walls approximately 3 to 4 metres high may reflect the layout of the monastic precinct. Orbach considers all their features to be from Jacobean pleasure gardens, and places the shell-headed wall niches at c.1600.

=== The Monastery Garden Cottage ===
Northeast of the church, on the road which leads to Steeple Ashton, a cottage named The Monastery Garden, possibly 16th century, is built into a stretch of wall which may have monastic origins.

A large rectangular fish-pond, north of the church, may be monastic in origin. Other adjacent ponds have been filled in.

=== Conduit head ===
About 400 metres southwest of the church is a small 14th-century building over the Ladywell spring, with stone water troughs. A conduit carried water to the monastery.

== Notable people ==
William Wey (c. 1407–1476), who made pilgrimages to Spain, Jerusalem, and Palestine, entered the monastery around 1463 and wrote his accounts of his travels there.

Paul Bush, the last provost of the monastery, became from c. 1539 a residentiary canon of Salisbury Cathedral, and from 1542 to 1554 the first bishop of Bristol.

== Parish church ==
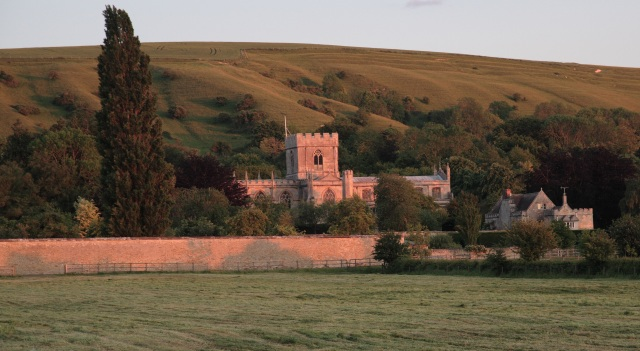
The church and Priory House, under the scarp of Salisbury Plain

The church stands today, a good example of the transition between the decorated and perpendicular style of church-building. Pevsner writes "A wonderful church and a highly important church. It is so varied in its skyline and so freely embattled that it looks like a fortified mansion ...". It was listed at Grade I in 1968.

The whole 14th-century church survives, with its interior enhanced in the 17th century, and restoration by Charles Ponting in 1888–91. Ponting also restored the limestone cross in the churchyard which may date from early in the 19th century.

The church has medieval glass and contains the burial monuments of several local notables, including tombs removed from St Giles at Imber during the early 1950s, following the evacuation of that village in 1943.

The benefices and parishes of Edington and Imber were united in 1951, with the parsonage house at Imber to be sold. Today the parish is part of the benefice of Bratton, Edington and Imber, Coulston and Erlestoke.

In 1965 there were six bells, one of them dated 1647 and three from the 18th century; four more (sounding higher notes) were hung in 1968 to make a peal of ten. There is also a sanctus bell. In 2014 a new organ by Harrison & Harrison was installed.

Every August since 1956 a festival of church music, the Edington Festival of Music within the Liturgy, is held here.

== Gallery ==
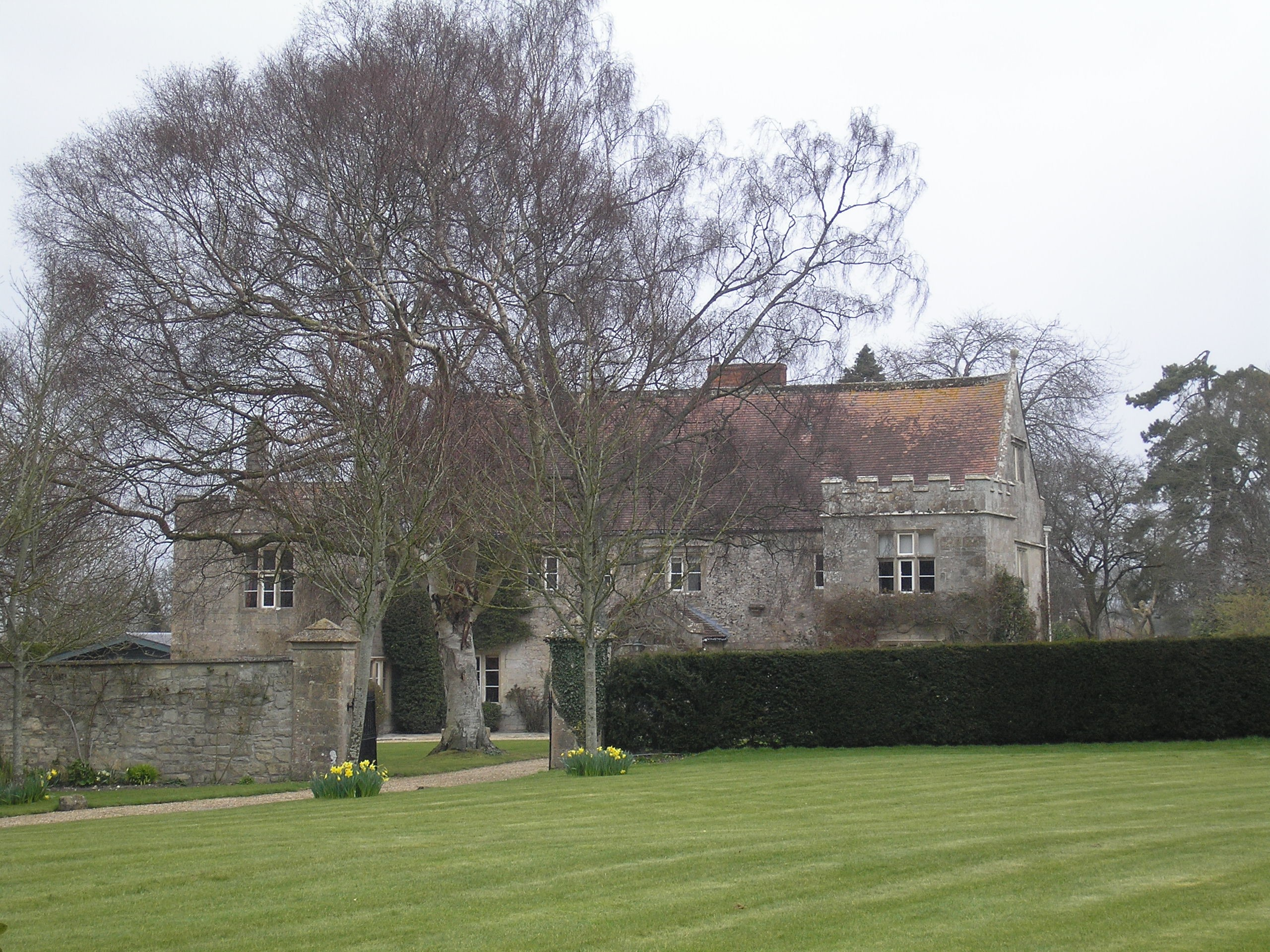
The Priory House in 2008

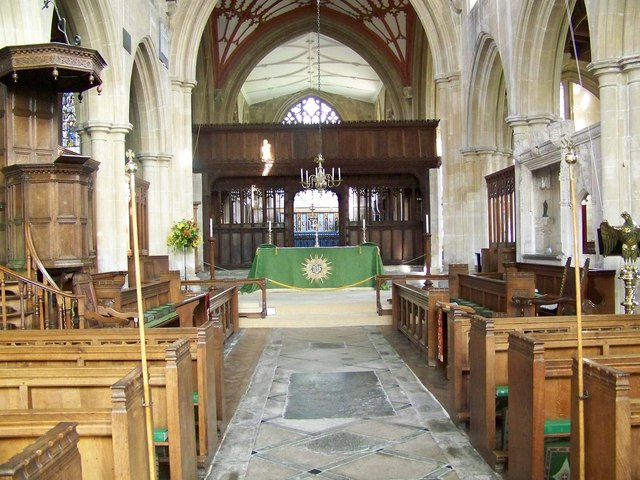
Pews in the nave

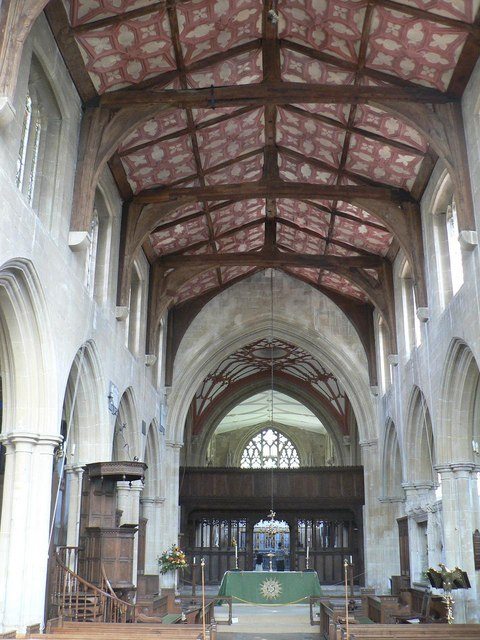
Roof of the nave

== See also ==
- List of English abbeys, priories and friaries serving as parish churches
