= Cuddington, Buckinghamshire =

Village in Buckinghamshire, England

Coordinates: 51.793671°N 0.929061°W

Cuddington
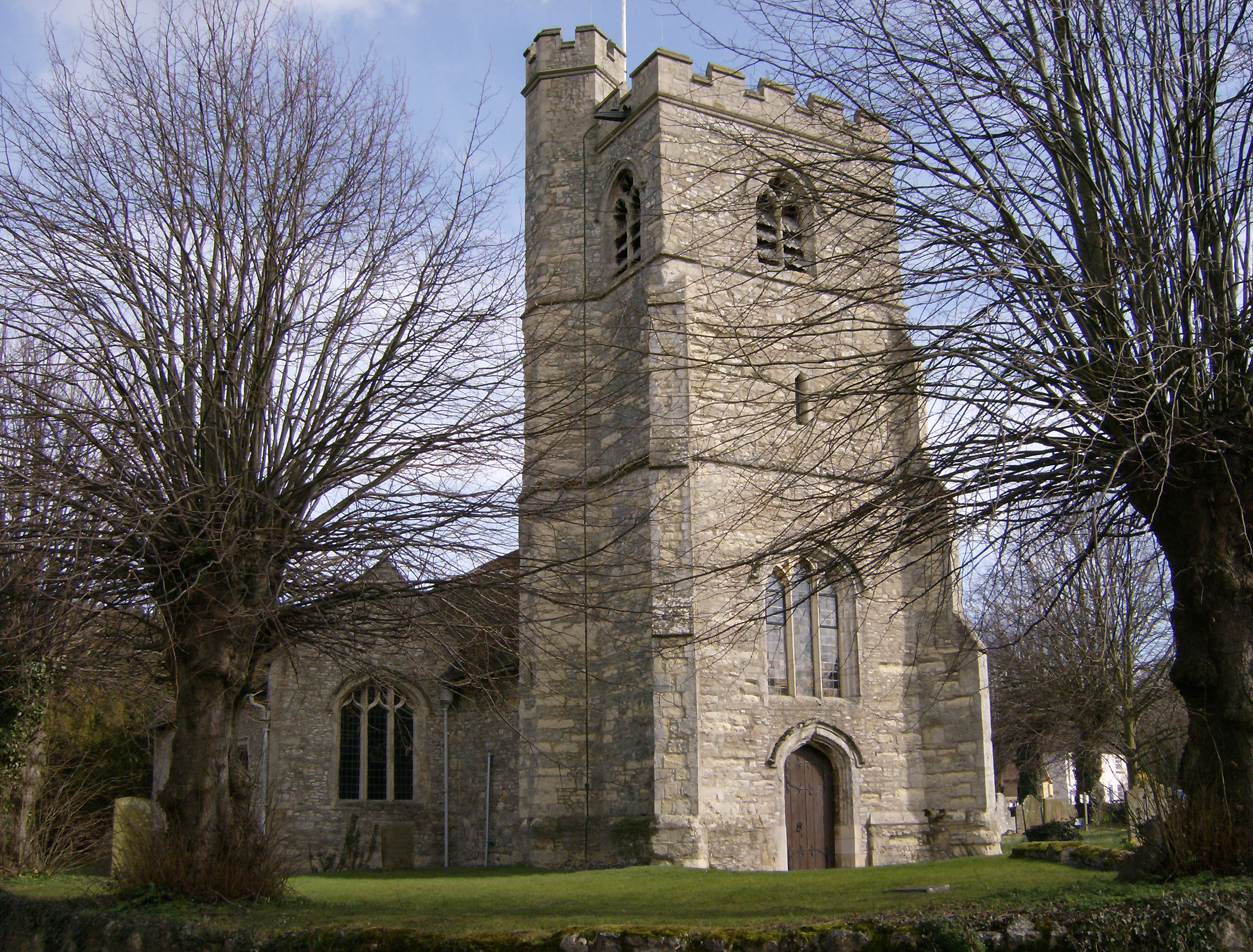
- St Nicholas's Church, Cuddington

- Location within Buckinghamshire
- Population: 569 (2011 Census)
- OS grid reference: SP738111
- Unitary authority: Buckinghamshire
- Ceremonial county: Buckinghamshire
- Region: South East
- Country: England
- Sovereign state: United Kingdom
- Post town: AYLESBURY
- Postcode district: HP18
- Dialling code: 01844
- Police: Thames Valley
- Fire: Buckinghamshire
- Ambulance: South Central
- UK Parliament: Mid Buckinghamshire

Cuddington is a village and civil parish within the Buckinghamshire district in the ceremonial county of Buckinghamshire, England. It is near the Oxfordshire border, about six miles west of Aylesbury.

The village name is Old English (Anglo-Saxon) in origin, and means "Cudda's estate." In the Domesday Book of 1086 it was recorded as Cudintuna. Anciently the village was the location of a medicinal spring of great repute, though its exact location is unknown. The Church of St Nicholas dates from the 12th Century but was much restored in 1857. Across the road is Tyringham Hall that dates from the 17th Century. During the Second World War the King of Norway who was staying at the nearby Hartwell House attended a church service in the village.

Cuddington is centred on the village green and the road junction linking Aylesbury, Long Crendon and Haddenham. The majority of the original houses were built on the north side but in the last 50 years or so new homes have been built predominantly on the south side.

The current population is around 550 residents. Two of the most famous former residents were Jonathan and David Dimbleby.

The village, like surrounding villages, has been the location of several Midsomer Murders episodes.

Facilities in the village include:

- Shop/post office
- Hairdressing salon
- Pub/Restaurant
- 2 Churches (although one of these is rarely used)
- Village Hall
- Playing Field with Clubhouse, Tennis Courts, Children's Park and Cricket and Football pitches

For many years the village has won the regional heat of Britain's Best Kept Village Competition and also the Britain in Bloom competition.

Cuddington and Dinton Church of England School is a mixed Church of England primary school. It is a voluntary aided school, which takes children from the age of four through to eleven. Cuddington was an infant school but has now merged with Dinton School to form a full primary school on two sites. In 2023 there were 182 pupils on roll.

== Famous residents past and present ==
- Richard Dimbleby - Broadcaster
- David Dimbleby – Broadcaster
- Jonathan Dimbleby – Broadcaster
- John Holyman – 16th century Bishop of Bristol
- Labi Siffre - Singer/ songwriter
- Terry Lloyd - ITN News Journalist
- Brendan Cole - dancer TV Entertainer
