= Rowland Searchfield =

English academic and bishop

Rowland Searchfield (Roland) (c. 1565 – 11 October 1622) was an English academic and bishop.

== Life ==
He was born in 1564 or 1565, and entered Merchant Taylors' School in 1575. He matriculated as fellow at St John's College, Oxford, on 6 July 1582, aged 17. He graduated B.A. on 11 October 1586, M.A. on 2 June 1590, and B.D. in June 1597; he was dispensed from the usual exercises on the grounds of duties at the command of the archbishop of Canterbury. He graduated D.D. on 1 June 1608.

He was appointed rector of the university on 21 April 1596, and was licensed to preach on 17 February 1606. In 1601 he was made vicar of Evenley, Northamptonshire, and rector of Burthrop, Gloucestershire, and in 1606 he became vicar of Charlbury, Oxfordshire, succeeding his father-in-law Ralph Hutchinson.

On 18 March 1619 he was elected bishop of Bristol, being consecrated on 9 May following, and receiving back the temporalities on the 28th. He died on 11 October 1622 and was buried in Bristol Cathedral. The diarist John Manningham described him as 'a dissembled Christian'.

By his wife Anne, daughter of Ralph and Mary Hutchinson, he had one or more sons.

== Notes ==
Church of England titles
Preceded by Nicholas Felton	Bishop of Bristol; 1619–1622	Succeeded by Robert Wright
