= Paul Bush (bishop) =

Bishop of Bristol

Paul Bush (or Bushe; 1490–1558) was an English Augustinian and the first bishop of Bristol of the new diocese.

== Life ==
Paul Bush, also spelt Bushe, was born in Somerset in 1490. He studied at the University of Oxford, taking his degree of B.A. about 1517, by which time he was known as a poet. He subsequently read divinity, studying among the Bonhommes whose house stood on the site of the present Wadham College. He also applied himself to the study of medicine. He took the degrees of B.D. and D.D., and having become a friar of the order, became a published author.

He rose to be provincial of the Bonhommes, and became provost of the house of this order at Edington, near Westbury, Wiltshire. He held the prebendal stall of Bishopston in Salisbury Cathedral, about 1539, and became one of the residentiary canons. He obtained royal favour and was made chaplain to Henry VIII, who, on the foundation of the bishopric of Bristol, selected Bush as the first bishop of the new see. Bush's replies to certain questions relative to the abuses of the mass, proposed in 1548, were largely those of an orthodox Catholic.

He married Edith Ashley, who died three months after the accession of Queen Mary, 8 October 1553; proceedings were anyway taken against him as a married priest. The following year, 20 March 1554, a commission, of which Stephen Gardiner and Edmund Bonner were the chief members, passed a sentence of deprivation on him. He made a voluntary resignation in the following June, when the dean and chapter of Canterbury assumed the spiritual jurisdiction of the see, 21 June 1554. He was accused of having impoverished the see by granting the manor of Leigh Court, Somerset, to Edward VI in 1549.

On his resignation, Bush retired to the rectory of Winterbourne, near Bristol, which he held till his death, which occurred at the age of 68 in 1558, a few days before Queen Mary's death on 11 October 1558. He was buried near the grave of his wife, on the north side of the choir of Bristol Cathedral, where his mutilated Renaissance monument, bearing his effigy as a decaying corpse with a tonsured head, still stands.

== Works ==
Bush was the author of the following works:

- A Lyttell Tretyse in Englyshe called the Exposycyon of Miserere mei Deus
- Certayne Gostly Medycynes necessary to be used among well disposed people, to eschew and avoid the comen plage of pestilence (Redman, no date). This is a small tract containing prayers and conjurations against the plague.
- A Lyttell Treatyse in Englyshe called the Extripacion (sic) of Ignorancy (Pynson, no date). This is a little poetical tract 'dedicated unto the yong and most hye renouned Lady Mary, prinses and daughter unto the noble progenytour and worthy soverayne Kyng Henry Eight.'
- De laudibus Crucis (no date).
- Dialogus inter Christum et Mariam (1525)
- An Exhortacyon to Margaret, wyf of John Burgess, clothier of Kingswood, in the county of Wilts, by Paul Bushe, bishop of Bristol (London, Cawood, 1554). John Burgess was more commonly known as John Bridges of Nind, Kingswood, and was a wealthy clothier and landowner.
- Carminum diversorum liber unus
