= James Brooks (bishop) =

English Catholic clergyman and bishop

The Right Reverend James Brooks
- Bishop of Gloucester
- Church: Roman Catholic
- Installed: 6 July 1554
- Term ended: 1558
- Predecessor: John Hooper
- Successor: Richard Cheyney

Orders
- Consecration: 1 April 1554 by Edmund Bonner

Personal details
- Born: May 1512 Hampshire, England
- Died: 7 September 1558 (aged 46)
- Buried: Gloucester Cathedral

James Brooks (or Brookes) (May 1512 – 7 September 1558) was an English Catholic clergyman and Bishop of Gloucester.

== Life ==
Born in May 1512, in Hampshire, southern England, Brooks became a Fellow of Corpus Christi College, Oxford in 1532, took the B.A. that same year and in 1546 the D.D. He was Master of Balliol College, Oxford in the years 1547–1555. He was Vice-Chancellor of the University of Oxford during 1552–3.

Widely known as an eloquent preacher, with the deprivation of John Hooper on the accession of Queen Mary, Brooks succeeded him as Bishop of Gloucester by papal provision in 1554 and was consecrated on 1 April.

In 1555, Brooks was one of the papal sub-delegates in the Royal Commission for the trial of the Oxford Martyrs, Thomas Cranmer, Hugh Latimer, and Nicholas Ridley. Brooks was a man not only of learning but also of integrity. He refused to degrade Ridley, probably on the ground that Ridley's consecration in 1547 had been according to the invalid form which was established by law very soon after that date. If, as the Protestant polemicist John Foxe asserts, Brooks refused to degrade Latimer as well, his position may have been based upon the fact that Latimer had lived for several years as a simple clergyman.

Brooks died in July or August 1558. He was buried in Gloucester Cathedral, but without a monument.

Academic offices
| Preceded by William Wright | Master of Balliol College, Oxford; 1547–1555 | Succeeded by Francis Babington |
| Preceded by Owen Oglethorpe | Vice-Chancellor of Oxford University; 1552–1553 | Succeeded by Richard Marshall |
Church of England titles
| Preceded by John Hooper | Bishop of Gloucester; 1554–1558 | Succeeded by Richard Cheyney |
