= Boni Homines =

The name Boni Homines ('Good men' in Latin) or Bonshommes (the same in French) was popularly given to at least three religious orders in the Catholic Church:

== Grandmontines ==
The Order of Grandmont, were an austere order founded by St. Stephen of Muret. By the end of the twelfth century they had more than sixty monasteries, principally in Acquitaine, Anjou and Normandy. The rules of the order were relaxed to a great extent after 1643. In the Eighteenth Century they had three convents of nuns. The order was suppressed in the French Revolution.

== The Fratres Saccati, or Brothers of Penitence ==
The Fratres Saccati, or Brothers of Penitence, were an order that were active in Spain, France and England. It is said that they controlled Ashridge Priory and Edington Priory in England, but this has been completely repudiated in an article by Richard Emory in the journal Speculum (1943), who attributes the original connection to Helyot's Dictionnaire des Ordres Religieux, which was compiled in Paris between the late 17th and early 18th centuries.

== The Portuguese Boni Homines of Villar de Frades ==
The Portuguese Boni Homines were founded by John de Vicenza in the fifteenth century. and their foundation was confirmed by Pope Martin V under the title of "Boni Homines". They had charge of all the royal hospitals in Portugal and sent missionaries to India and Ethiopia.
