= Richard Cheyney =

Bishop of Gloucester

Richard Cheyney (1513 – 29 April 1579) was an English churchman, bishop of Gloucester from 1562. Opposed to Calvinism, he was an isolated and embattled bishop of the reign of Elizabeth I, though able to keep his see.

== Life ==
Born in London, according to John Strype, he was a scholar of Christ's College, Cambridge, where he proceeded BA in 1529. In 1530 he was elected fellow of Pembroke Hall; was ordained subdeacon 24 February 1532, and priest 21 September 1534; and commenced MA(Cantab) in 1532 and BD in 1540. He supported Sir John Cheke in the controversy on Greek pronunciation. He received over time the livings of Halford, Warwickshire (1547), Maids Moreton, Buckinghamshire (1558), and Bishop's Hampton, Herefordshire (1559), of Plainsford, Gloucestershire, and .

He was a court in Edward VI's reign, and on 3 February 1552 he was appointed archdeacon of Hereford, and afterwards one of the keepers of the spiritualities of the see of Hereford during a vacancy. As archdeacon he attended the convocation of Canterbury at the beginning of the reign of Queen Mary (October 1553); according to Heylyn few of the Edwardian clergy were present. By the command of the queen the convocation proceeded to vote a proposition declaratory of transubstantiation in the Eucharist. Against this six divines offered to dispute, the five known being: Walter Phillips, dean of Rochester; James Haddon, dean of Exeter; John Philpot, archdeacon of Winchester; John Aylmer, archdeacon of Stow; and Cheyney. Haddon and Aylmer were reluctant to comply with the conditions proposed for the discussion, but Cheyney who held Lutheran views on the subject began, and, the others afterwards coming to his assistance, it continued for four days. His disputation is printed in John Foxe's Acts and Monuments. He resigned his archdeaconry in 1557, and became canon of Gloucester 14 November 1558; he had retired for a time to his living of Halford in the diocese of Worcester, under Richard Pate, one of those exempt from executions for heresy under Queen Mary. Cheyney paid a priest to perform the services.

On the accession of Elizabeth I, Cheyney went on a preaching tour, and during his absence on this work the ecclesiastical visitors employed to carry out the queen's injunctions of 1559 visited Halford, where they found the rector absent, and the priest in charge a probable Catholic. They amerced the absent incumbent and seized his corn. Cheyney was well known to William Cecil, and was very soon (6 April 1560) invited to preach before the queen. He then told her that her visitors ought rather to be called takers, as they had impoverished his living. Soon afterwards, in a letter to Cecil, he complained of neglect. On 21 June 1560 Cheyney was appointed canon of Westminster, and the provostship of Eton College being vacant by deprivation, Archbishop Matthew Parker recommended Cheyney for the post, unsuccessfully. Next year (1562) he obtained by Cecil's influence the bishopric of Gloucester, to which he was consecrated April 19, and by letters patent bearing date April 29 was allowed to hold the see of Bristol in commendam. On 3 May the archbishop issued a commission to Cheyney, as commendatory of the see of Bristol, to visit the diocese, appointing him his vicar-general in spirituals. But Parker withdrew his commission for Bristol diocese from Cheyney, and appointed John Cotterell in his place 23 May 1563. The bishop wrote to Cecil, complaining of the encouragement thus given to puritanism which was rampant in his diocese, and expressing his wish to resign. Cecil was willing to translate Cheyney to Chichester in 1568, but the archbishop objected. In 1569 the degree of D.D. was conferred on Cheyney at Cambridge.

Cheyney continued to act as bishop of Gloucester, becoming very popular by his liberality; but ran into debt.' About October 1576 process issued out of the exchequer to seize his lands and goods for 500l. due to the queen for arrears of tenths. The bishop, however, begged for time, and the request seems to have been granted. Cheyney died on 29 April 1579 at the age of sixty-five, and was buried in his cathedral of Gloucester.

Cheyney is an ancestor of Dick Cheney former Vice President of the United States, and relative through Jane Cheney to Thomas Wriothesley, 1st Earl of Southampton.

== Views ==
Cheyney, a Lutheran ed, was opposed the Thirty-nine Articles of 1563. From a letter (22 December 1566) of Edmund Gheast to Cecil it seems that Cheyney was offended by the insertion of the word 'only' in Article XXVIII on the Eucharist, and that he found it impossible to subscribe to this statement of doctrine. This article was drawn up by Gheast, who defended it against Cheyney, but without success.

Three of his sermons (preached 22 August, 29 August, 1 September 1568) against Calvinist doctrine gave such offence at Bristol that he was answered in the cathedral by James Calfhill, and also by John Northbrooke, a preacher of Bristol. On another visit to Bristol, where his views were unacceptable, the bishop again preached on the freedom of the will and on the corporal presence in the Eucharist.

In 1571 it became obligatory on all the bishops and clergy to subscribe the Articles. Cheyney refused to attend the convocation or to sign. It was unanimously resolved that he was contumacious and ought to be excommunicated. Accordingly, the sentence of excommunication was pronounced by the archbishop (20 April), and was entrusted to Guy Etton, the archdeacon of Gloucester, accompanied by the queen's pursuivant, to be published in Gloucester Cathedral. Two or three days after a chaplain of the bishop appeared for him as proxy and requested absolution. This was granted, but only to the next meeting of convocation, when it would be necessary for the bishop to attend and give explanations. He apparently submitted, and was absolved on 12 May 1571. But he seems to have remained under a sort of ban.

The isolated Cheyney was a target for Edmund Campion, who had received sympathetic treatment from him. In his letter to Cheyney, by whom he had been ordained a deacon in the Anglican Church, he commends him for dealing gently with Catholics in his diocese, and exhorts him to convert. The letter produced no effect. Cheyney had been an antagonist to Rome, and was not inclined to accept her claims.

== Notes ==
Church of England titles
Preceded by James Brooks	Bishop of Gloucester; 1562–1579	Succeeded by John Bullingham
