= Robert Brown (archdeacon of Bedford) =

The Venerable Robert Saville Brown

Personal details
- Born: 12 September 1914
- Died: 20 April 2001 (aged 86)
- Education: Bedford Modern School; Selwyn College, Cambridge

The Ven. Robert Saville Brown (12 September 1914 – 20 April 2001) was Archdeacon of Bedford from 1974 to 1979. Brown was educated at Bedford Modern School and Selwyn College, Cambridge. He was ordained in 1941, served a curacy in Hitchin and held incumbencies at Wonersh (1947–53), Great Berkhamsted (1953 – 1969) and Bedford (1969–1974).

Church of England titles
Preceded by John Hare	Archdeacon of Bedford; 1974–1979	Succeeded by Christopher Mayfield
