= John Pope =

John Pope is the name of:

== Politicians ==
- John Pope (fl. 1384–1397), MP for Gloucester
- John Pope (fl.1419–1421), MP for Reigate
- John Pope (Kentucky politician) (1770–1845), U.S. politician, senator for Kentucky, and governor of Arkansas Territory
- John Pope (alderman) (born c. 1972), Chicago alderman from the 10th ward
- John Pope (planter) (1794–1865), Alabama politician and Tennessee planter
- John Henry Pope (1824–1889), Canadian farmer, lumberman, railway entrepreneur, and politician

== Military ==
- John Pope (travel writer) (died 1795), U.S. soldier, traveler, and author
- John Pope (naval officer) (1798–1876), U.S. naval officer in the American Civil War
- John Pope (general) (1822–1892), U.S. soldier and Union general in the Civil War

== Others ==
- John Pope (artist) (1821–1880), artist in Boston, Massachusetts, and New York in the 19th century
- John Pope (fictional astronaut), fictional character in James A. Michener's 1985 novel Space
- John Pope (rower), English rower
- John Pope (priest) (died 1558), English priest
- John Pope (1856–1896), companion of American businessman Lewis Ginter
- John Alexander Pope (1906–1982), director of the Freer Gallery of Art in Washington, DC
- John Edwin Pope (1928–2017), American sportswriter
- John Russell Pope (1874–1937), American architect
- John Pope, fictional character in the American television series Falling Skies

== See also ==
- Pope John (disambiguation)
