= Highland Heights, Memphis =

Neighborhood in Memphis, Tennessee

Coordinates: 35.149°N 89.948°W

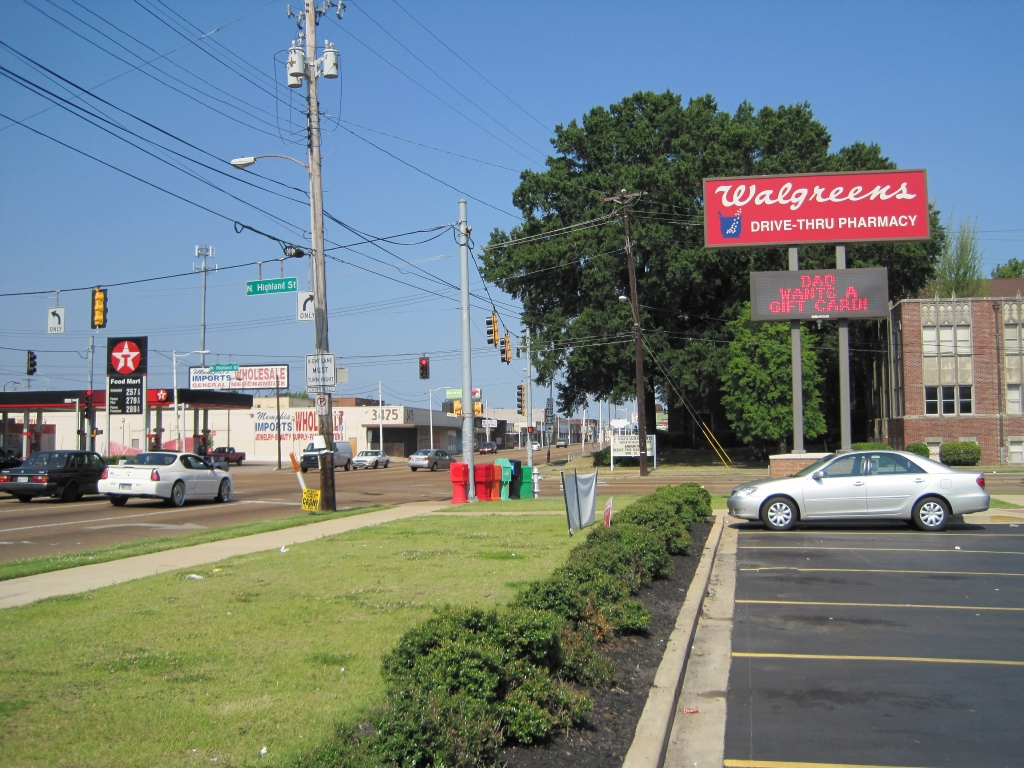
Highland Street and Summer Avenue in Highland

Highland Heights (also sometimes known as Mitchell Heights) is a neighborhood in Memphis, Tennessee which grew up around the intersection of National Street and Summer Avenue. At its beginning, it was in the county as a rural community, east of the Memphis city limits.

The land of the John Pope family cotton plantation was subdivided after the death in 1865 of the pater familias. John was the son of Leroy Pope, founder of Huntsville, Alabama, also a planter, and Yale-educated. He practiced law before settling down to raise cotton and his children. He informed himself of the latest innovations in cotton cultivation, maximizing yields and winning awards. When Memphis Confederates surrendered to the invading Union Army, John had harvested a record crop, which he promptly burned to prevent any benefit or succor to the enemy.

To respond to the expansion of Memphis to the east, Shelby County bought several parcels to form the first "work farm" (penal farm), insane asylum and poor house. The simple, identical houses constructed for these purposes are still evident on Pope Street and Lamphier Avenue.

The intersection at National Street and Summer Avenue is where the Raleigh Springs Electric Railway line of the trolley system turned north toward Raleigh. The original light rail line was financed by B.I. Duke, one of the North Carolina tobacco Dukes (Duke University, Duke Power & Light). He owned "the largest and finest" of the hotels in the renowned spa/resort of Raleigh Springs, and was insuring ready access by Memphis businessmen who would install for their families in Raleigh for the summer.

The first school of Highland Heights was formed in a hotel near this same intersection on the property which currently holds Highland Heights Baptist Church and school. National is a street divided by a grassy median, once the location of the streetcar tracks. This particular line in the tram system is significant because it carried business owners downtown to work from Raleigh Springs, where they would install their families for the summer, commuting by rail to their downtown businesses. In 1929, The Heights were annexed into the city, with an area of 4.13 square miles and its population grew to 12,000.

When the Highland Heights Elementary and High School were built, the 3 acres were donated by A.B. Treadwell and family in 1915. In 1939, the schools were renamed in his honor. The first class graduated Treadwell High School in 1942.

The term "the Heights," in this context, refers to Highland Heights, Grahamwood Heights, and Mitchell Heights of Memphis, Tennessee. There are other neighborhoods in Memphis which incorporate the word 'heights' in their name. These three are contiguous. Their newsletter is also titled 'The Heights.' Highland Heights includes the area bounded by Summer Avenue (also known as U.S. Highways 70 & 79, and formerly known as the Nashville Highway) on the south, Pope Street on the west, Macon Road on the north, and Homer Street on the east. Residents of the Nutbush neighborhood have been known to claim an eastern portion of this, up to Highland Street, as part of Nutbush. Mitchell Heights advocates claim all of this, and more, west to Tillman Street, as part of Mitchell Heights. Neighborhood-naming in Memphis is not an exact science.
