= Tim Wambunya =

Bishop of Wolverhampton

The Right Reverend Tim Wambunya
- Bishop of Wolverhampton
- Church: Church of England
- Diocese: Diocese of Lichfield
- In office: 2024–present
- Predecessor: Clive Gregory
- Other post: Bishop of Butere in the Anglican Church of Kenya (2013-20)

Orders
- Ordination: 1997 (deacon); 1998 (priest) by Richard Chartres (deacon), Graham Dow (priest)
- Consecration: 6 October 2013

Personal details
- Born: Timothy Livingstone Amboko Wambunya; 1965 (age 60–61) Kenya
- Denomination: Anglican
- Spouse: Gertrude
- Children: three
- Education: Middlesex University, Oxford University, University of Wales, Oak Hill College

Timothy Livingstone (Amboko) Wambunya (born 1965) is an Anglican bishop. He was the Anglican Bishop of Butere in Kenya until September 2020, when he resigned and left Kenya after recovering from COVID-19. In 2024, he was announced as the next Bishop of Wolverhampton, an area bishop in the Church of England Diocese of Lichfield; which See he took up on 15 October.

== Early life and education ==
Timothy Wambunya was born in Kenya. He came to the United Kingdom aged 19, and spent seven years in the navy before training for the priesthood.

Wambunya gained a BA in theology from Middlesex University in 1996, followed by a Master's in Philosophy from Oxford University and a PhD in Paremiology from the University of Wales.

He studied at the Simon of Cyrene Theological Institute, then at Oak Hill College in London, receiving a Bachelor of Arts degree in 1994.

== Clerical career ==
Wambunya took orders in the Church of England: he was made deacon at Petertide 1997 (28 June) by Richard Chartres, Bishop of London, at St Paul's Cathedral; and ordained priest the following Petertide (4 July 1998) by Graham Dow, Bishop of Willesden, at St Martin's Church, Ruislip. He served his curacy at St John's Church, Southall, and was ordained priest in 1998. In 2000 he became a team vicar in the Tollington parish, serving at Emmanuel Church, Holloway; and in 2007 was appointed principal of the Church Army's Carlile College in Nairobi, Kenya.

Wambunya was consecrated as the third Bishop of Butere on 6 October 2013, succeeding Horace Etemesi (1993–2003) and Michael Joshua Sande (2003–2013). As Bishop of Butere he attended and led a seminar at the 2018 Global Anglican Future Conference, but he would later criticise the movement, saying in 2020 "Personally, I think the Gafcon axis has become obsessed with the matter of sexuality."

In 2020 he left Kenya and his episcopal role, and in September was appointed vicar of St Paul's Church in Slough, a 'resource church' in the Church of England Diocese of Oxford; he also became an honorary assistant bishop of that diocese in 2021.

In 2024 he was announced as the next Bishop of Wolverhampton, an area bishop in the Diocese of Lichfield. His welcome service was scheduled for 15 October 2024; he duly took up his See on that date.

In September 2024, Wambunya was formally rebuked by the Church of England after ordaining Revd Wamare Juma of the Revealed Evangelical Mission, a "non-denominational para-church" not in communion with the Church of England, as a bishop in a service in Germany in April of that year. He apologised, attributing his actions to his "lack of understanding of the polity of the Church within which I am now serving".

== Personal life ==
He is married to Gertrude and has three sons.
