= Ludwig Bieler =

Austrian-born scholar of Hiberno-Latin

- Born: October 20, 1906; Vienna, Austria-Hungary
- Died: May 2, 1981 (aged 74); Dublin, Ireland
- Occupation: Philologist
- Known for: Hiberno-Latin studies
- Notable work: The Patrician Texts in the Book of Armagh; Ireland:Harbinger of the Middle Ages; Theodosius the Great

Ludwig Josef Georg Bieler (20 October 1906 – 2 May 1981) was an Austrian-born scholar, best known for his research in Hiberno-Latin literature, focusing on the transmission of classical and Christian thought from the Roman Empire into medieval Europe.

== Early life and education ==
After attending the Landstraßer Gymnasium in Vienna, he studied classical philology at the University of Vienna, the University of Tübingen, and the Ludwig-Maximilians-Universität München, studying under Radermacher, Weinreich, and Kretschmer. He received his doctorate in philosophy at the University of Vienna in 1929 (dissertation: "De vita S. Samsonis questiones tres"). He obtained degrees in teaching and library studies; between 1930 and 1938 he taught at several schools and worked as a manuscript librarian.

== Career ==
In 1938, Ludwig Bieler was a lecturer in philology at the University of Vienna. The day following the Anschluß—the annexation of Austria by Nazi Germany on 12 March 1938—he left the country and went into exile in Switzerland.

His flight, the first overt political act of his life, was made because of a commitment to intellectual freedom and from an awareness that a mind such as his could not flourish in a National Socialist world.

While in Switzerland, Bieler met Eva Uffenheimer, with whom he quickly formed a close relationship. On 13 April 1938, he informed the university dean that Uffenheimer came from a Jewish family. On April 22, 1938, he was "suspended until further notice" and later expelled from the university. Although Bieler was Catholic and considered Aryan, his Viennese teaching career came to an end as the Nazis did not approve of his ideological beliefs and associations. The couple passed through France and England, where they married. In 1940, he immigrated to Ireland, having received an appointment to the National University of Ireland to teach paleography and early medieval Latin. The university was looking for someone with experience writing about Irish saints; Bieler had written his thesis on one, and he was given the appointment. Except for a year (1947–1948) in the U.S. at the University of Notre Dame, he continued academic work in Ireland until his 1977 retirement. He declined a chair at Graz in 1954. Post‑war, although the Austrian Academy of Sciences elected him as a corresponding member in 1964, a return to Austria—neither to the University of Vienna nor any Austrian university—“never came about.”

Ludwig Bieler’s greatest and most influential work is widely considered to be The Patrician Texts in the Book of Armagh (Dublin Institute for Advanced Studies, 1979). This edition brought together the most important Latin texts associated with Saint Patrick, preserved in The Book of Armagh, a 9th-century Irish manuscript. It remains the standard scholarly edition for studying Patrick’s Latin writings and their manuscript context. Bieler applied rigorous classical philological methods to early medieval Irish texts, bringing them to international scholarly attention. His work shaped decades of subsequent scholarship on early Irish Christianity and Latin literature in medieval Ireland.

Bieler's work provided the foundation for modern understanding of early Irish literature and early medieval Irish culture. His work was lucid and authoritative. He epitomized Hiberno-Latin scholarship in Ireland and, because of his scholarship, "study of Hiberno-Latin literature ceased to be the poor relation of medieval studies."

== Personal ==
In 1939, he married Eva, a Froebel teacher and refugee from Nazi Germany; they had two children. Eva died in 1997, while living with their daughter and son-in-law, Michael Gay Bourke, the Anglican Bishop of Wolverhampton.
