= Tom Hutton =

Tom Hutton may refer to:

- Tom Hutton (American football) (born 1972), former football player
- Tommy Hutton (born 1946), former baseball player and current announcer

== See also ==
- Thomas Jacomb Hutton (1890–1981), British general
- Thomas Hutton (priest), Canon of Windsor, 1485–1487
