= John Tinsley =

Bishop of Bristol (1976–1985)

Ernest John Tinsley
- Bishop of Bristol (1976–1985)
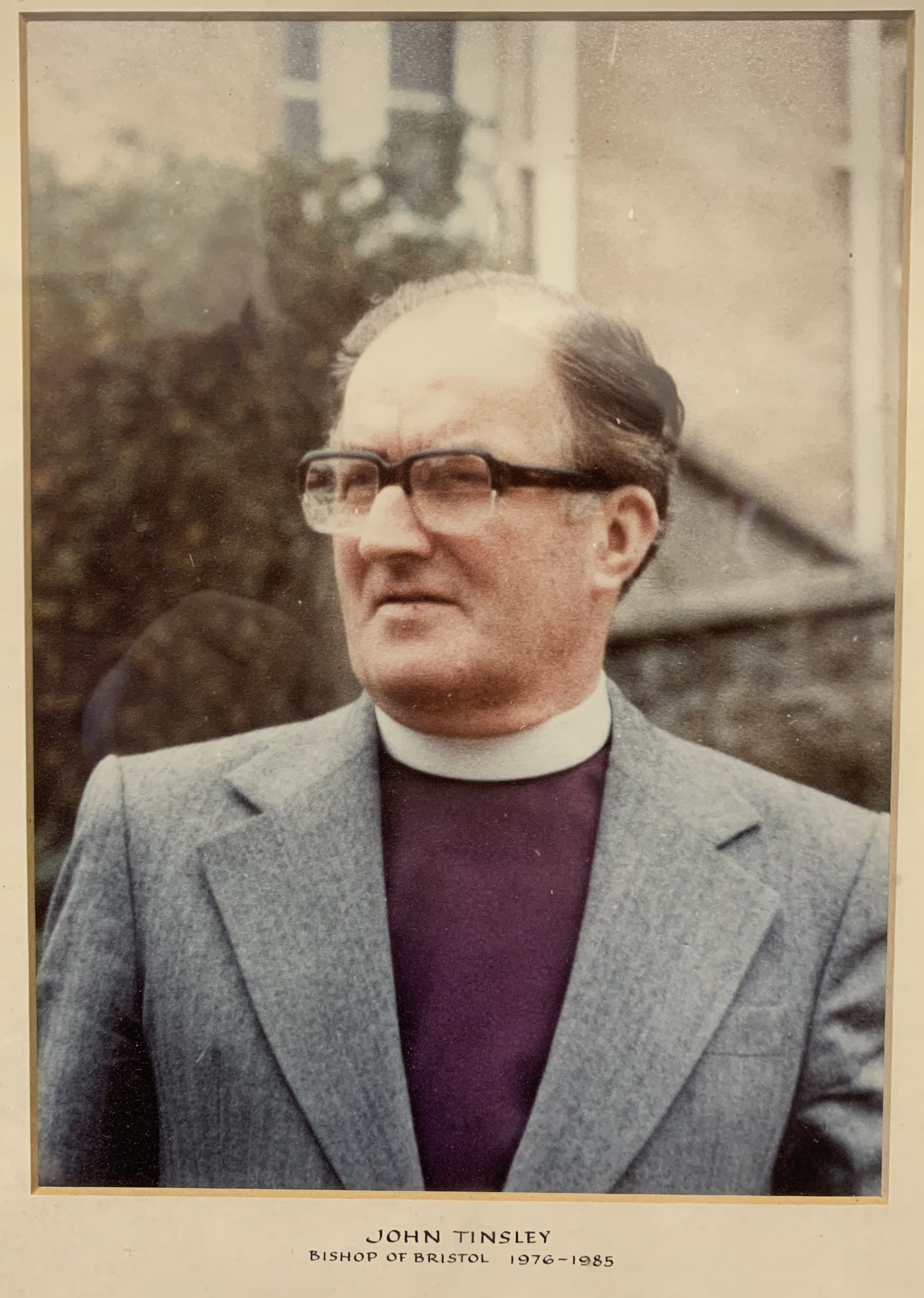

Orders
- Ordination: 1943
- Consecration: by Donald Coggan, Archbishop of Canterbury

Personal details
- Born: 22 March 1919
- Died: 20 July 1992 (aged 73)
- Occupation: Bishop
- Education: Durham University

Ernest John Tinsley (22 March 1919 – 20 July 1992, aged 73) was the Bishop of Bristol from 1976 to 1985.

Born on 22 March 1919 he was educated at Durham University. He was ordained in 1943, after which he held curacies at Durham and South Westoe.

Timsley was a Lecturer in Theology at University College, Hull (which became the University of Hull in 1954) from 1946 until 1962 when he was appointed Professor of Theology at the University of Leeds. He left Leeds in 1976 when he was appointed to the episcopate. He was ordained and consecrated a bishop by Donald Coggan, Archbishop of Canterbury, at Southwark Cathedral on 6 January 1976, his canonical election having been confirmed towards the end of 1975. A prolific author, he died on 20 July 1992.

Church of England titles
Preceded by Oliver Tomkins	Bishop of Bristol; 1975–1985	Succeeded by Barry Rogerson
