= John Crakehall =

13th-century English clergyman and Treasurer of England

- Archdeacon of Bedford
- Appointed: 1254
- Predecessor: John de Dyham
- Successor: Peter de Audeham

Personal details
- Born: before 1210
- Died: c. 8 September 1260 London
- Buried: Waltham Abbey

Lord High Treasurer
- In office 2 November 1258 – c. 8 September 1260
- Monarch: Henry III
- Preceded by: Philip Lovel
- Succeeded by: John of Caux

John Crakehall (or John of Crakehall or John de Crakehall; died September 1260) was an English clergyman and Treasurer of England from 1258 to 1260. Possibly the younger son of a minor noble family in Yorkshire, Crakehall served two successive bishops of Lincoln from around 1231 to the 1250s. He then became an archdeacon in the diocese of Lincoln before being named as treasurer, where he served until his death in 1260. He owed his appointment to the treasurership to a number of factors, including his reputation for administrative ability and his relationship with the leader of the baronial effort to reform royal government. While in office, he strove to improve the administration of the exchequer as well as collect outstanding debts to the government and improve royal revenues.

== Early life ==
Crakehall was from Crakehall in the North Riding of Yorkshire and may have been a younger son of Ellis of Crakehall. Ellis was a sub-tenant who held lands in the lordship of Richmond. His birthdate is unknown, although it was likely before 1210. He had an elder brother, Peter, and at least one sister who reached adulthood. If John was Ellis' son, he was related to a number of important families in Yorkshire, including the Nevilles and d'Oyry families.

From later career and letters, Crakehall must have been educated in at least theology, and his activities as an administrator indicate that he was literate. He is never accorded the title of magister, which indicates that if he did attend a university, he did not complete his studies.

== Service to Hugh of Wells ==
Crakehall first appears in records when he was the attorney at Westminster for Hugh of Wells, the Bishop of Lincoln, over Easter in 1231. On 9 April 1231 he was installed as the rector of Somerton in Oxfordshire. Crakehall retained this benefice until his death. Until 1233, Crakehall appears occasionally as a member of Hugh's household, but after March of that year Crakehall appears more often.

While serving Hugh, Crakehall became a canon of Lincoln Cathedral sometime after 1233 or 1234. He was ordained a subdeacon sometime before April 1235. Hugh named Crakehall as an executor of his estate in June 1233. Hugh died in February 1235, and Robert Grosseteste was elected as bishop by the end of March 1235.

== Service to Grosseteste ==
Crakehell served Grosseteste from around 1235 to 1250 as the chief steward of the Diocese of Lincoln. As steward he was involved in a number of disputes, including one in 1240 over the rights of the bishop to visit and inspect the activities of the dean and cathedral chapter of Lincoln Cathedral. In 1241 Crakehall was Grosseteste's agent in negotiations with King Henry III of England over the prebend of Thame. Crakehall's advocacy of the bishop's cause did not affect his relations with the king, who later granted the steward several small royal favours over the following years.

In 1250 Crakehall went with Grosseteste to Lyon to meet with Pope Innocent IV. He had resigned as steward at some point before the trip to Lyon, but the exact date is unknown. No administrative records survive from Crakehall's time as steward, which limits the ability of historians to record his career fully. But the regulations that the bishop drew up for his household survive, and would have governed Crakehall's actions. They essentially prohibited anyone employed by Grosseteste from accepting any gifts except food or drink, while also banning unfair demands. After leaving the steward's office, Crakehall remained close to the bishop, and in 1251 was appointed by Grosseteste to review the bishopric's finances, which had suffered under Crakehall's successor as steward.

While in Grosseteste's service, Crakehall acquired a number of minor ecclesiastical offices by 1240 and in 1247 he was named rector of Eddlesborough in Bedfordshire. When Grossteste died in late 1253, Crakehall was present at the deathbed and his account of the event was the basis for Matthew Paris' account in the Chronica majora. Crakehall served as Grosseteste's executor, a fact that is known only from Crakehall's actions as Grossteste's will has not survived. Besides his service to the bishops of Lincoln, Crakehall corresponded with Adam Marsh and was one of Marsh's close friends. Crakehall was Archdeacon of Bedford by 18 November 1254 when he was named as such.

== Treasurer ==
Crakehall was appointed Treasurer of England on 2 November 1258. He owed his appointment to the baronial council that was formed under Simon de Montfort, which had recently taken power from the king's hands. It is likely that Montfort was behind the council's appointment, as the Crakehall and Montfort shared a mutual network of friends, although it is not clear if the relationship between the two went beyond mutual acquaintanceship. The fact that Montfort's longstanding appeal to the treasury for payment of a debt was partially granted just two days after Crakehall's appointment is a clue pointing to Montfort's role in Crakehall's appointment.

Another reason for the appointment of the archdeacon by the council was a need to mitigate somewhat the lingering image of corruption stemming from the bad reputation of Philip Lovel, the previous treasurer. For this, a treasurer who had experience with working under Grossteste's household strictures would have made the archdeacon an attractive appointment. Crakehall's ability to manage the finances of the diocese of Lincoln, which was the largest diocese in England, would also have played a role in his appointment. His reputation for competence, which had caused him to be recalled to oversee his successor as steward, was also well known. His familiarity with Grosseteste's views on the need for financial soundness in government would have also played a role.

As treasurer Crakehall worked to implement the reforms laid out in the Provisions of Westminster of 1259. Royal revenues during the early 1250s did not have access to some of the more lucrative sources of revenue that were irregular, such as ecclesiastical vacancies and royal wardships over minor heirs to tenant-in-chief's of the king. A further problem was the impoverishment of the Jewish community, resulting from too many previous exactions made by the government. The king was also overly generous to his relatives and pursued expensive foreign policy efforts that put serious strains on the royal budget.

To combat the problems facing the treasury, Crakehall worked to improve the stability of the royal revenues and during his time in office, there was a small increase in the proceeds paid into the exchequer. One of his efforts was attempting to recover debts owed by former sheriffs. His appointment had originally been just for one year, but the council of barons extended it another year in 1259. Other efforts were to better utilize royal wardships as royal revenue streams, instead of the king's previous use of them as patronage for his favourites, which resulted in much lower royal income. Under the baronial council and Crakehall, these wardships were sold in order to maximize the royal profit. The resulting income was usually, although not always, put aside to pay off royal debts.

Other areas of reform included the royal mints, which had a reputation for corruption and inefficiency. A commission was appointed to look into the running of the mints, and several moneyers were required to report to the treasurer and give guarantees that they would perform their work well in the future. The record keeping of the treasury was further refined, with small improvements to the auditing of the sheriff's accounts, the memoranda rolls, and to the receipt rolls of the treasury. Lastly, all fines that came in to the treasury were intended to go to the exchequer instead of to the wardrobe, as had previously been the case. This would allow the revenues from fines to be properly accounted for.

Crakehall was also a prebendary of Rugmere in the Diocese of London, where he was installed sometime in February 1259. He was ousted from the Rugmere prebend when the papacy appointed another clergyman to the prebendary. His tenure of Rugmere was marred by a dispute with the eventual papal appointee, Jordan Piruntus, which led to the murder of two clergymen by Crakehall's men. Rumours circulated that Crakehall had been implicated somehow in the murders but the rumours were unfounded.

== Death and legacy ==
Crakehall died between 8 and 10 September 1260, in London. He was buried at Waltham Abbey. In later years, Lincoln Cathedral commemorated his death annually on 5 September. Although Crakehall was ordained in major orders, which normally required celibacy, he had a daughter, Petronilla. Whether he was married to Petronilla's mother or not is unknown. Petronilla was married to Alan of Kingthrope. Petronilla and her husband inherited part of Crakehall's estate while the other part went to Crakehall's nephew, William of Cadeby.

As treasurer, Crakehall oversaw a slight increase in royal revenues and improved the record-keeping and administrative activities of the treasury. The failure to greatly increase royal income and the king's expanding debts can, according to the historian Adrian Jobson, be laid more at the feet of the baronial council than the treasurer. The royal government needed a new income stream, but the reformers failed to find it, which led to the treasury almost ceasing to function soon after Crakehall's death, and eventually to the Second Barons' War in 1264.
