= Oliver Tomkins =

Bishop of Bristol (1908–1992)

The Right Reverend Oliver Tomkins
- Bishop of Bristol
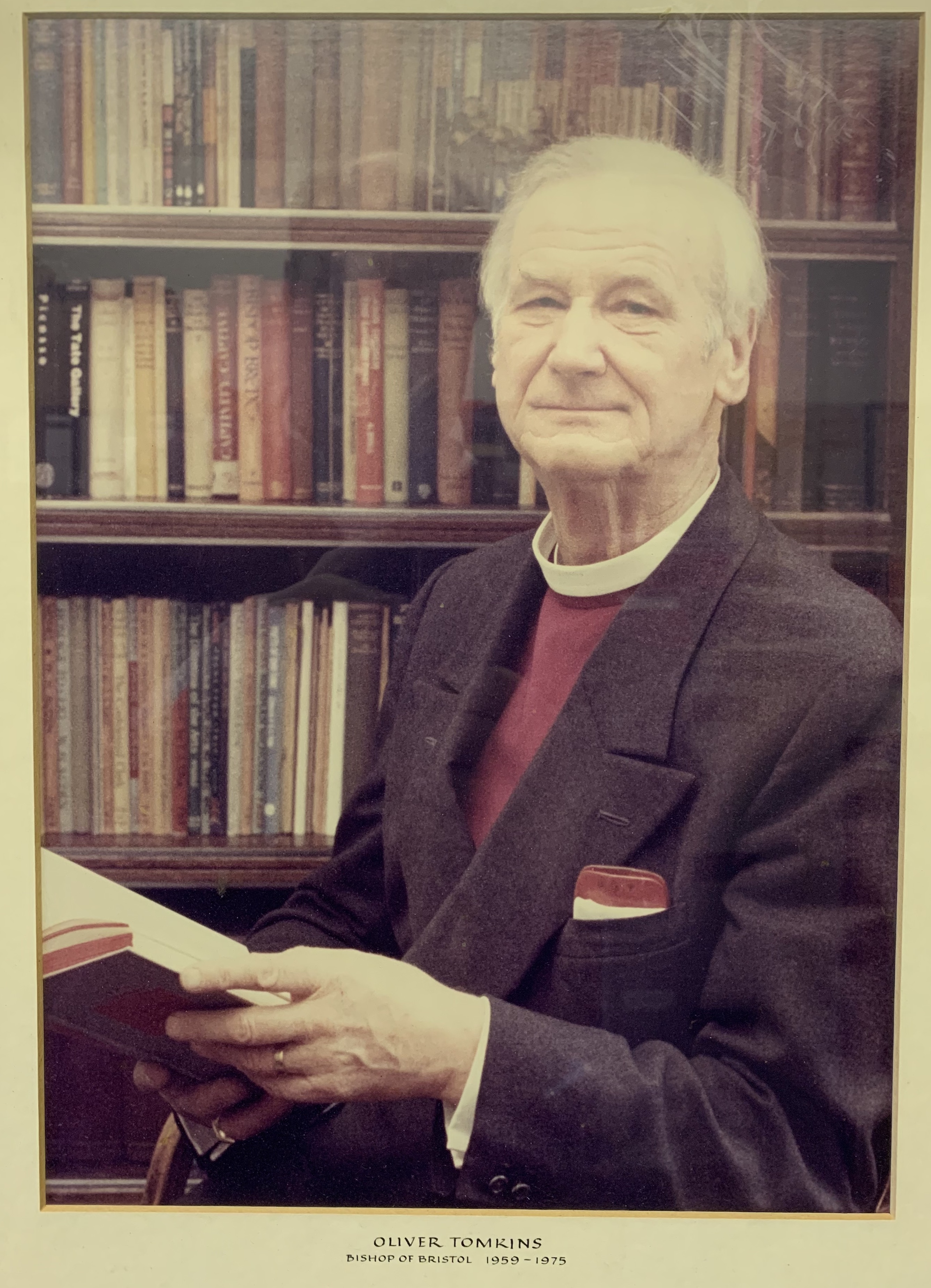
- Diocese: Diocese of Bristol
- Elected: 1958
- Term ended: 1975 (retirement)
- Predecessor: Frederic Cockin
- Successor: John Tinsley
- Other posts: Canon at Lincoln Cathedral (1952–1959); Warden of Lincoln Theological College (1945–1952)

Orders
- Ordination: 1936
- Consecration: 1959

Personal details
- Born: 9 June 1908
- Died: 29 October 1992 (aged 84)
- Denomination: Anglican
- Parents: Leopold Tomkins
- Occupation: Bishop, author
- Education: Christ's College, Cambridge

Oliver Stratford Tomkins (9 June 1908 – 29 October 1992) was a British bishop in the Church of England. He was a Bishop of Bristol and an author.

== Early life and education ==
Tompkins was born into an ecclesiastical family and his father was the Reverend Leopold Charles Fellows Tomkins. Tomkins was educated at Trent College and Christ's College, Cambridge.

== Ordained ministry ==
He was made a deacon on Michaelmas 1935 (29 September) and ordained a priest the Michaelmas following (20 September 1936) — both times by Henry Wilson, Bishop of Chelmsford, at Chelmsford Cathedral, after which he was assistant curate of St Mary, Prittlewell. From 1940 to 1945, he was vicar of Holy Trinity, Millhouses. In 1945, he became secretary of the World Council of Churches. In 1952 he was appointed warden of Lincoln Theological College and a canon at Lincoln Cathedral.

Tomkins was appointed to the episcopate in 1959 as the Bishop of Bristol and consecrated a bishop on 6 January 1959, by Geoffrey Fisher, Archbishop of Canterbury, at Westminster Abbey; a post he held for 16 years until his retirement on 1 October 1975.

== Bibliography ==
Tomkins was also an author. His works included:

- The Universal Church in God's Design (1948)
- The Wholeness of the Church (1949)
- The Church in the Purpose of God (1950)
- Intercommunion (1951)
- Life of E. S. Woods, Bishop of Lichfield (1957)
- A Time for Unity (1964)
- Guarded by Faith (1971)
- Prayer for Unity (1987)

Church of England titles
Preceded by Frederic Cockin	Bishop of Bristol; 1959–1975	Succeeded by John Tinsley
