= Thomas Frank (priest) =

English priest (d.1731)

Thomas Frank was an English priest.

Fox was born in Cranfield and educated at Merton College, Oxford. He held the living at Cranfield and was Archdeacon of Bedford and a Canon of Lincoln Cathedral from 1704 until his death on 2 March 1731.
