= Church of St Andrew, Biggleswade =

Anglican church in England

Coordinates: 52°05′13″N 0°16′03″W

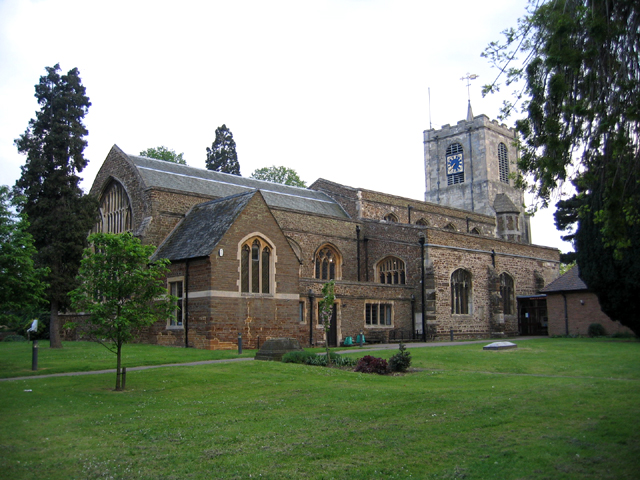
St Andrew's church is Biggleswade's main Anglican church

St Andrew's Church is the Anglican parish church for the town of Biggleswade in Bedfordshire, England. The church is Grade II* listed and comes under the Diocese of St Albans. The church is noted for its monumental brass of John Rudying of 1481 featuring the Figure of Death.

== History ==
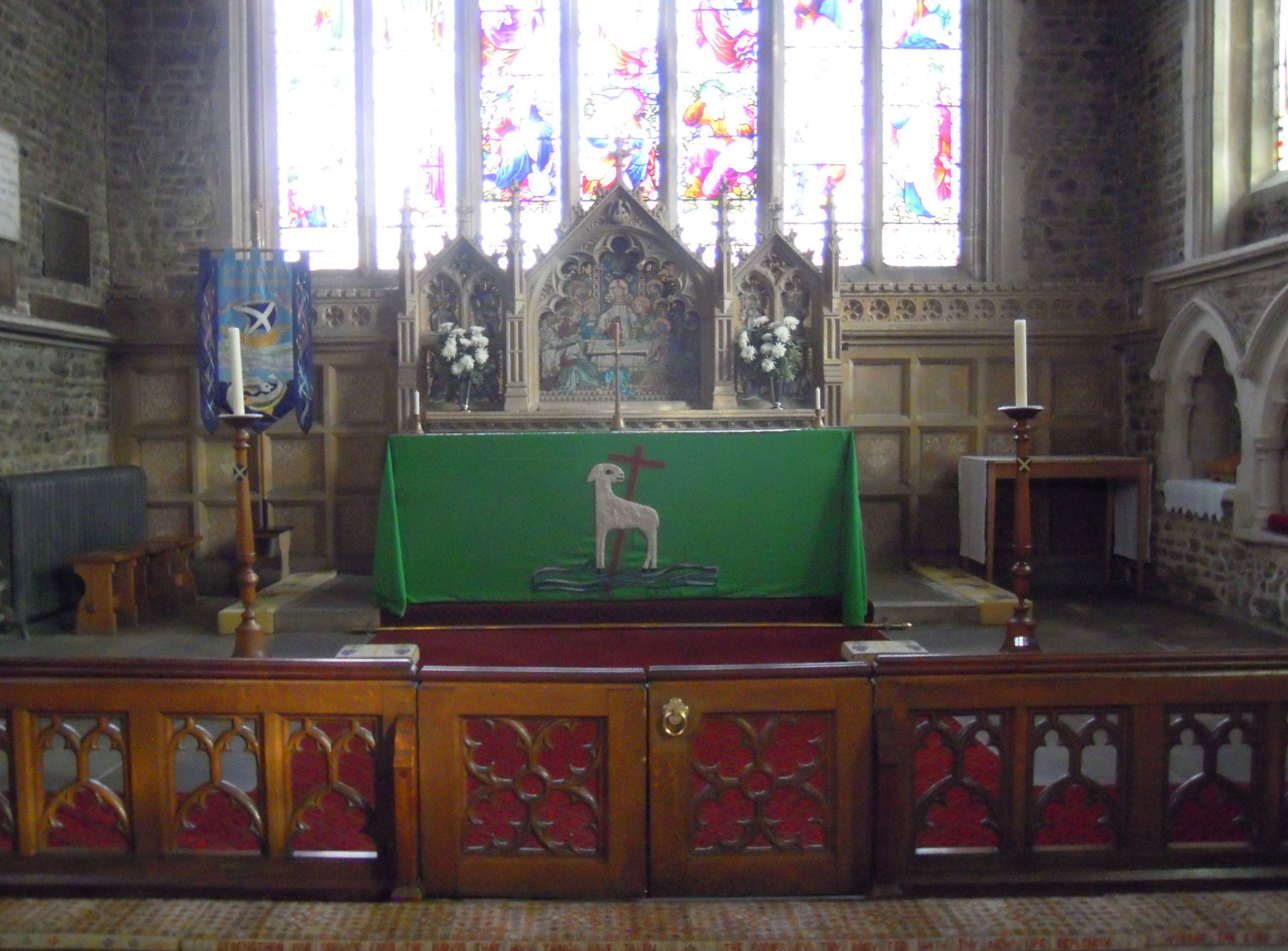
The East Altar

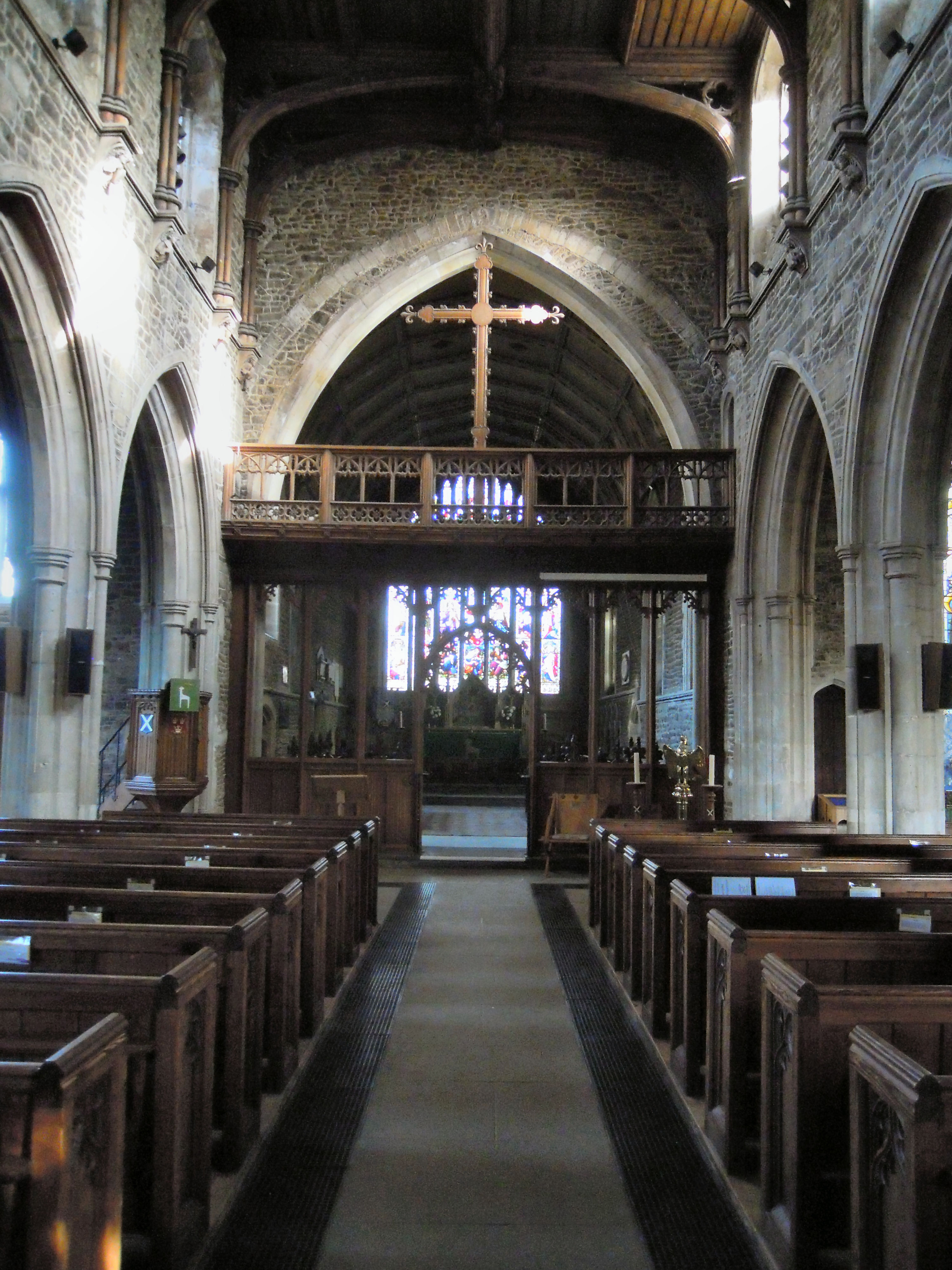
Looking up the nave towards the East altar

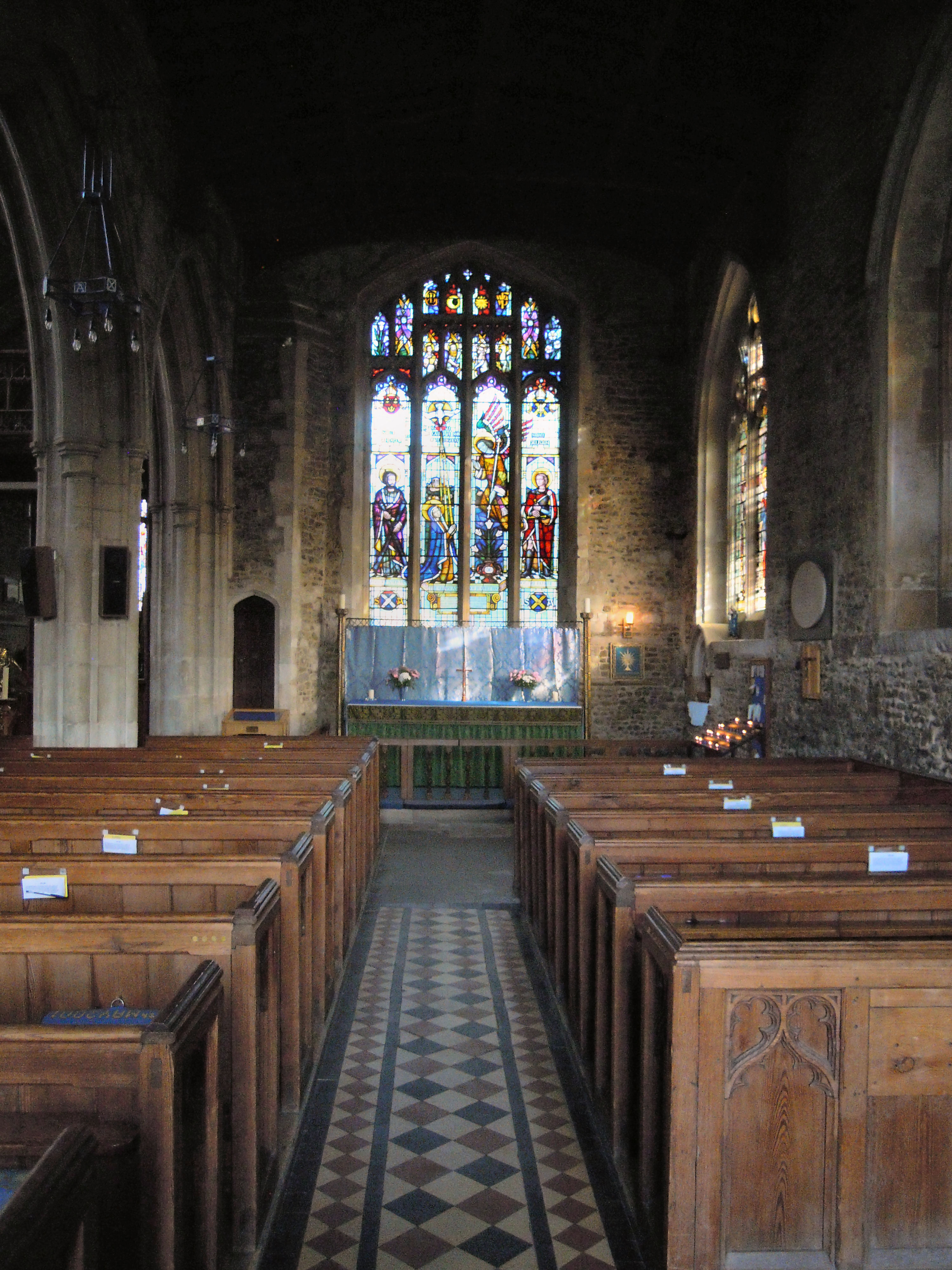
The Lady Chapel aisle

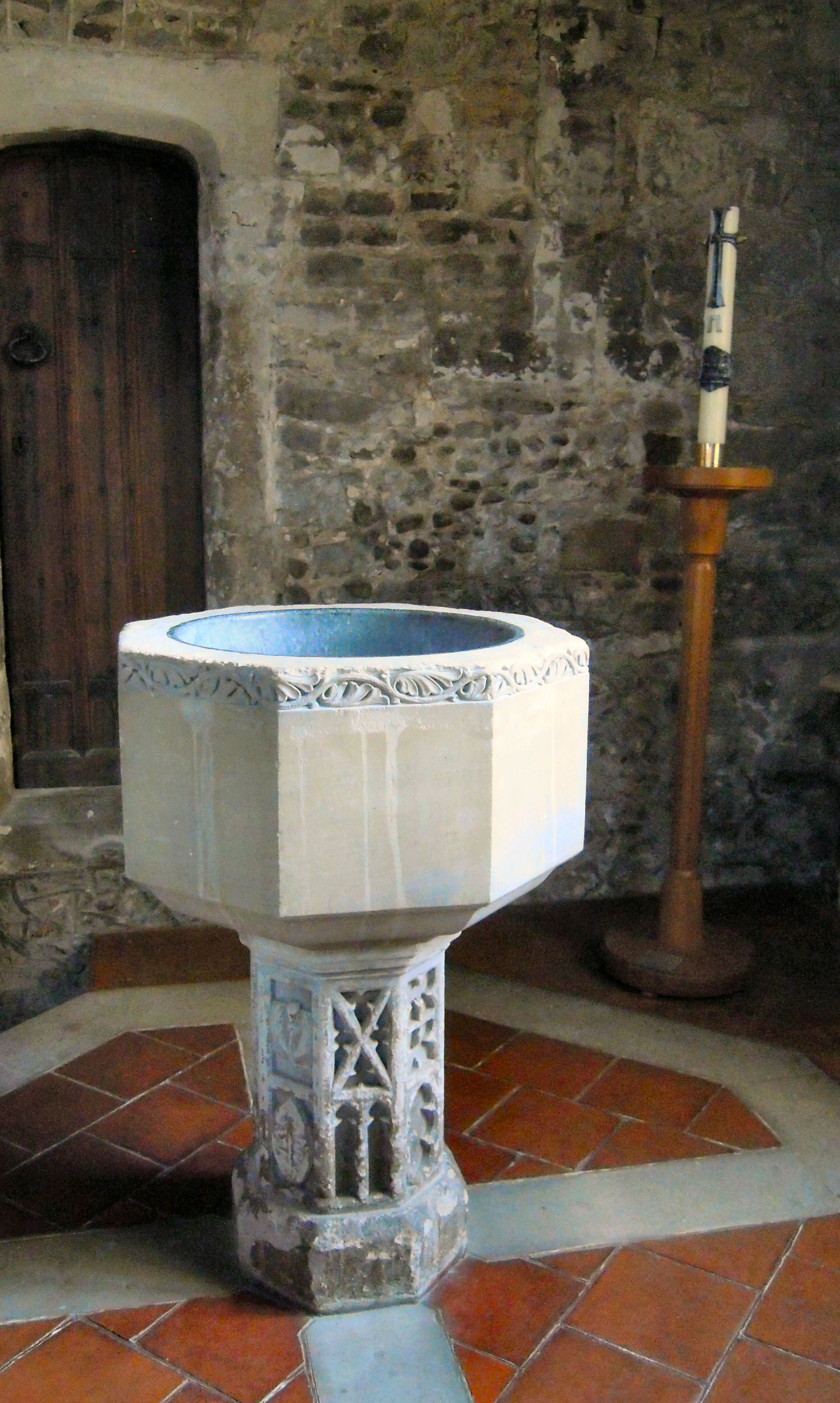
The baptismal font

St Andrew's church is first mentioned in a grant of the manor of Biggleswade to Alexander I, the Bishop of Lincoln in 1132 to help endow Lincoln Cathedral. In about 1163 Bishop Robert de Chesney made the church a Royal Peculiar. On 18 November 1200 a miracle occurred in St Andrew's Church when Hugh, Bishop of Lincoln, died in London and his body rested at Biggleswade on the way to Lincoln. A woman with a broken arm touched his body and it is reported that she was healed and the wax tapers in the procession stayed alight. St Hugh was canonised in 1220. However, none of the present building dates back to that period with the oldest extant part today being from about 1300. Most of the church is from the Perpendicular Period with the chancel believed to have been rebuilt or refurbished between 1467 and 1481 by Archdeacon John Rudying (d. 1481).

The medieval tower collapsed in the early 1700s and was rebuilt in 1720 and fitted with a ring of five bells cast by Thomas Russell of Wootton in 1721. The church underwent a major restoration in 1870 when the roofs and stonework were repaired, an organ chamber was added and corbels were fitted to carry the wall-posts for the nave roof.

A stone reredos designed by the London architect R J Withers was added in 1877 with decoration by the famous mosaicist company of Antonio Salviati in 1881. Between 1885 and 1888 the church architect William Butterfield made additional improvements to St Andrew's which included reroofing the chancel and the addition of a new vestry. The chancel and organ chamber were damaged by a fire in November 1953 and were restored between 1953 and 1955 which included adding an organ gallery at the church's West end.

== Design ==
The tower arch and five doorways in the church date to about 1300 AD but the remainder of the building is from the Perpendicular Period with the chancel dating to about 1470. In the floor of the chancel are the remains of a monumental brass of 1481 to Archdeacon John Rudying who is said to have rebuilt or refurnished the chancel. There is a Latin inscription between Rudying and the Figure of Death who is about to strike him with a spear. It is the same memorial that was said to have been destroyed during the restoration of St Andrew's Church in 1870. This is described as lying in a large Purbeck Marble slab in the middle of the chancel being 11½ ft by 5½ ft with the effigy and canopy with Saints John the Baptist, Anna, Elizabeth, and Mary of Egypt being destroyed but other figures of Death and angels and a Latin inscription surviving.

The interior walls were stripped of plaster in the late 19th century. The nave and aisles are separated by Perpendicular four-bay arcades with moulded arches and piers with four shafts. At the West end the tall tower arch dates to the earliest tower of about 1300, while the remainder of the church tower dates to 1720. St Andrew's is built of coursed dark ironstone rubble, while the tower is of grey ashlar on an ironstone base. The church has limestone dressings. The stained glass in the East window was installed in 1877, while the chancel window in the South West depicting the Crucifixion is of 1882 and is by Lavers, Barraud and Westlake. The middle window on the South of the chancel is by Charles Eamer Kempe.

The church has been Grade II* listed since 20 May 1952.

== See also ==
- Monumental brass of John Rudying
