= Archdeacon of Bedford =

Position in the Church of England

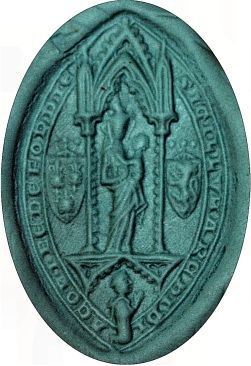
Wax seal (created post-2003) from 12/13th c. brass matrix of the Archdeacon of Bedford, found in South Lincolnshire in 2003 by a metal detectorist. Latin inscription: SIGILLUM ARCHIDIACONI BEDEFORDI(A)E ("Seal of the Archdeacon of Bedford"). The arms at dexter are Cantilupe (modern): Gules, three leopard's faces jessant-de-lys or, as used by Saint Thomas de Cantilupe (d.1282), Bishop of Hereford, and later adopted as the arms of the See of Hereford

The Archdeacon of Bedford is an ecclesiastical post in the Church of England Diocese of St Albans in the Province of Canterbury. Historically the post was in the Diocese of Lincoln, then from 1837 in the Diocese of Ely, England. On 13 April 1914, the archdeaconry became a part of the Diocese of St Albans. The present holder of the office is Dave Middlebrook, collated Archdeacon on 30 March 2019.

== Seal ==
The 12/13th c. brass seal-matrix of the Archdeacon of Bedford was found in South Lincolnshire in 2003 by a metal detectorist, in almost perfect condition. It displays a legend in Latin: SIGILLUM ARCHIDIACONI BEDEFORDI(A)E ("Seal of the Archdeacon of Bedford"). Of two heraldic shields, that shown at dexter displays the arms of Cantilupe (modern): Gules, three leopard's faces jessant-de-lys or, as used by Saint Thomas de Cantilupe (d.1282), Bishop of Hereford, and later adopted as the arms of the See of Hereford. The reason for the use of the Cantilupe arms on the seal is unclear, the surviving (but incomplete) list of Archdeacons of Bedford does not include a member of the Cantilupe family. The office of Archdeacon of Bedford had no connection with the See of Hereford and is known to have been under the control of the See of Lincoln, hence a possible reason for the location the object was found in. The Cantilupe family were feudal barons of Eaton (Bray) in Bedfordshire and were seated (amongst many other places) at Eaton Castle, near Dunstable, not too far from the town of Bedford. A junior branch (see Baron Cantilupe) was seated at Greasley Castle in Nottingham and at Withcall in Lincolnshire, in which county they were prominent. Nicholas de Cantilupe, 3rd Baron Cantilupe (c.1301–1355) of Greasley founded the Cantilupe Chantry in Lincoln Cathedral and was buried in the Cathedral where survives his mutilated recumbent effigy. However the armorials of the Greasley branch include a fess vair, not shown on the seal. The style of the seal with the gothic architectural elements date it to the 13/14th. centuries. Measurements: 32 mm x 51 mm; weight 2.5 g.

== List of archdeacons ==
=== High Medieval ===
- bef. May 1092 – ?: Osbert
- 1105: Ralph
- bef. 1129 – aft. 1141: Hugh
- bef. 1145 – aft. 1175 (d.): Nicholas
- 1180: Laurence
- c. 1181 – aft. 1198: Alan
- bef. 1199 – aft. 1203: Richard
- aft. 1203 – c. 1205: Geoffrey
- bef. 1206 – 1218 (d.): Alexander of Elstow
- 1218: John Octon
- 1218 – 1231 (res.): John de Houton (afterwards Archdeacon of Northampton)
- 1231 – c. 1246 (d?): Amaury of Buckden
- 1246 – c. 1253 (res.): John de Dyham
- bef. 1254 – 1260 (d.): John of Crakehall
- 1260–1268: Peter de Audeham
- 1268 – January 1273: John de Maidenstan (afterwards Archdeacon of Oxford)
- bef. 1275 – c. 1277: Nicholas de Hegham (afterwards Archdeacon of Oxford)
- bef. 1280 – October 1282 (d.): Richard de Bradewell
- 1282–1291: John Hook
- ?: Stephen Gardiner?
- 30 December 1291 – 10 September 1319: Roger Rothwell/Rowell (deprived)

=== Late Medieval ===
- 10 September 1319 – 26 January 1230: Thomas Neville (set aside)
- 26 January 1320 – 1333 (d.): Edmund London
- 1333–?: John Daubeny
- 1333 – 30 August 1351 (exch.): Philip Daubeny
- 30 August 1351 – bef. 1372: Thomas Cumpton
- bef. 1372 – bef. 1375: John Irtlingburgh
- bef. 1375 – 1405 (d.): Thomas Stowe
- 19 November 1405 – 1423 (d.): William Aghton
- 17 April 1423 – 1431 (res.): Richard Caudray (afterwards Archdeacon of Lincoln)
- 1431 – 1439 (d.): William Derby
- 14 February 1439 – 1450 (d.): Robert Thornton
- 21 May 1450 – 1460 (d.): Thomas Salisbury
- 15 December 1460 – 1468 (res.): John Rudying (afterwards Archdeacon of Northampton)
- 4 December 1468 – 1471 (res.): John Collinson (afterwards Archdeacon of Northampton)
- 6 Auguster 1471 – bef. April 1489 (res.): Henry Sharp
- April 1489 – 1494 (res.): Thomas Hutton (afterwards Archdeacon of Huntingdon)
- 17 February 1494 – 1525 (d.): William Cosyn
- 11 January 1525 – 1549 (d.): John Chambre

=== Early modern ===
- 7 July 1549 – 1554 (res.): Gilbert Bourne
- 1 May 1554 – 11 November 1558 (d.): John Pope
- 15 November 1558 – February 1559 (d.): Michael Dunning (deprived)
- 14 March 1559 – 1560 (res.): Richard Barber (afterwards Archdeacon of Leicester)
- 24 December 1560 – 1574 (d.): William Todd
- 31 May 1574 – 1598 (d.): John Robinson
- 14 March 1598 – 6 December 1599 (res.): Roger Parker
- 4 February 1600 – 1631 (d.): George Eland
- 4 October 1631 – 1661 (res.): John Hacket (afterwards Bishop of Lichfield and Coventry, 1661)
- May 1662 – 16 July 1667 (d.): Francis Wilford
- August 1667 – 22 November 1678 (d.): Theophilus Dillingham
- 15 February 1679 – 3 April 1704 (d.): John Skelton
- April 1704 – 2 March 1731 (d.): Thomas Frank
- 22 May 1731 – 1745 (d.): John Dudley
- 15 March 1745 – 1756 (res.): John Taylor (afterwards Archdeacon of Leicester)
- 16 July 1756 – 1757 (res.): Charles Jenner (afterwards Archdeacon of Huntingdon)
- 28 April 1757 – 28 February 1771 (d.): Richard Grey
- 20 March 1771 – 1782 (d.): Hadley Cox
- 18 May 1782 – 1 June 1783 (d.): William Done
- 19 June 1783 – 3 January 1809 (d.): Richard Shepherd
- 12 January 1809 – 1821 (d.): Samuel Vince
- 10 December 1821 – 1845 (res.): Henry Bonney

The archdeaconry was transferred from the diocese of Lincoln to the diocese of Ely by Order-in-Council on 30 May 1837

- 12 March 1845 – 29 June 1866 (res.): Henry Tattam

=== Late modern ===
- 1866 – 31 January 1873 (d.): Henry Rose
- 1873 – 23 September 1910 (d.): Frederick Bathurst
- 1910 – 1914 (res.): Noel Hodges (also assistant bishop)

Since the diocese's erection on 13 April 1914, the Archdeaconry of Bedford has been part of the Diocese of St Albans

- 1924 – 1933 (res.): Arthur Parnell
- 1933 – 14 November 1934 (d.): Gerard Lander (also Assistant Bishop of St Albans; former Bishop of Victoria)
- 1935 – 1945 (ret.): William Robins
- 1946 – 1955 (res.): Donald Harris
- 1956 – 1958 (res.): Basil Guy (also Bishop suffragan of Bedford from 1957)
- 1958 – 1962 (res.): Basil Snell
- 1962 – 1973 (res.): John Hare (also Bishop suffragan of Bedford from 1968)
- 1974 – 1979 (ret.): Robert Brown
- 1979 – 1985 (res.): Christopher Mayfield
- 1986 – 1993 (res.): Michael Bourke
- 1993 – 2003 (ret.): Malcolm Lesiter (archdeacon emeritus since retirement)
- September 2003 – 31 December 2018 (ret.): Paul Hughes (afterwards archdeacon emeritus)
- 30 March 2019 – present: Dave Middlebrook

== Sources ==
- Greenway, Diana E. (1977), Fasti Ecclesiae Anglicanae 1066-1300, vol. 3, pp. 41–44
- King, H.P.F. (1962), Fasti Ecclesiae Anglicanae 1300–1541, vol. 1, pp. 16–17
- Horn, Joyce M.; Smith, David M. (1999), Fasti Ecclesiae Anglicanae 1541–1857, vol. 9, pp. 12–14
- Horn, Joyce M. (1992), Fasti Ecclesiae Anglicanae 1541–1857, vol. 7, p. 14
- Bedfordshire County Council page
