= Paul Hughes (priest) =

Anglican archdeacon

- Archdeacon of Bedford
- Diocese: Diocese of St Albans
- In office: 2003–2018
- Predecessor: Malcolm Lesiter
- Successor: Dave Middlebrook

Orders
- Ordination: 1982 (deacon); 1983 (priest) by John Taylor

Personal details
- Born: 4 August 1953 (age 73)
- Denomination: Anglican
- Parents: Reginald & Eileen
- Spouse: Liz (m. 1984)
- Children: 2
- Education: Polytechnic of Central London (Urban Estates Management); Ripon College Cuddesdon

Paul Vernon Hughes (born 4 August 1953) is a British retired Anglican priest and the most recent Archdeacon of Bedford, in the Church of England Diocese of St Albans, 2003–2018.

== Family and education ==
Son of Reginald Harry Hughes and Eileen Mary, Paul was educated at Ghyll Royd prep school, Ilkley and at Pocklington School. He studied at Polytechnic of Central London for a Diploma in Urban Estates Management, and became a Residential Property Surveyor in 1974. He then trained for the ministry at Ripon College, Cuddesdon, 1979–1982. He married Liz Hawkes in 1984 and they have two children, Christopher and Nicola. Liz trained at Cuddesdon (1981–1983) and is now a priest, an honorary canon of St Albans Cathedral, and Senior Chaplain at Luton Airport.

== Ministry ==
Hughes was made deacon at Petertide 1982 (27 June) and ordained a priest the Petertide following (3 July 1983) – both times by John Taylor, Bishop of St Albans, at St Albans Cathedral. His entire ministry was exercised in the Diocese of St Albans: after a curacy at Chipping Barnet with Arkley (1982–1986), he served as a Team Vicar in the Dunstable Team Ministry (1986–1993).

He then became parish priest of Boxmoor: first as priest-in-charge, then (from 1998) as vicar (a purely legal distinction); and served additionally as Rural Dean of Hemel Hempstead from 1996. He was collated Archdeacon of Bedford in September 2003 and retired on 31 December 2018. In retirement, he is an archdeacon emeritus.

Church of England titles
Preceded by Malcolm Lesiter	Archdeacon of Bedford; 2003–2018	Succeeded by Dave Middlebrook
