= John Skelton (priest) =

John Skelton was an English priest in the second half of the 17th century and the first decade of the 18th.

Skelton was educated at The Queen's College, Oxford. He was chaplain to Bishop Thomas Winniffe and held livings at Stixwold, Scrayfield, East Wickham and Walgrave. Skelton was appointed a canon of Lincoln Cathedral in 1683 and Archdeacon of Bedford in 1679, holding both positions until his death on 3 April 1704.
