= Monumental brass of John Rudying =

Monument of the Figure of Death

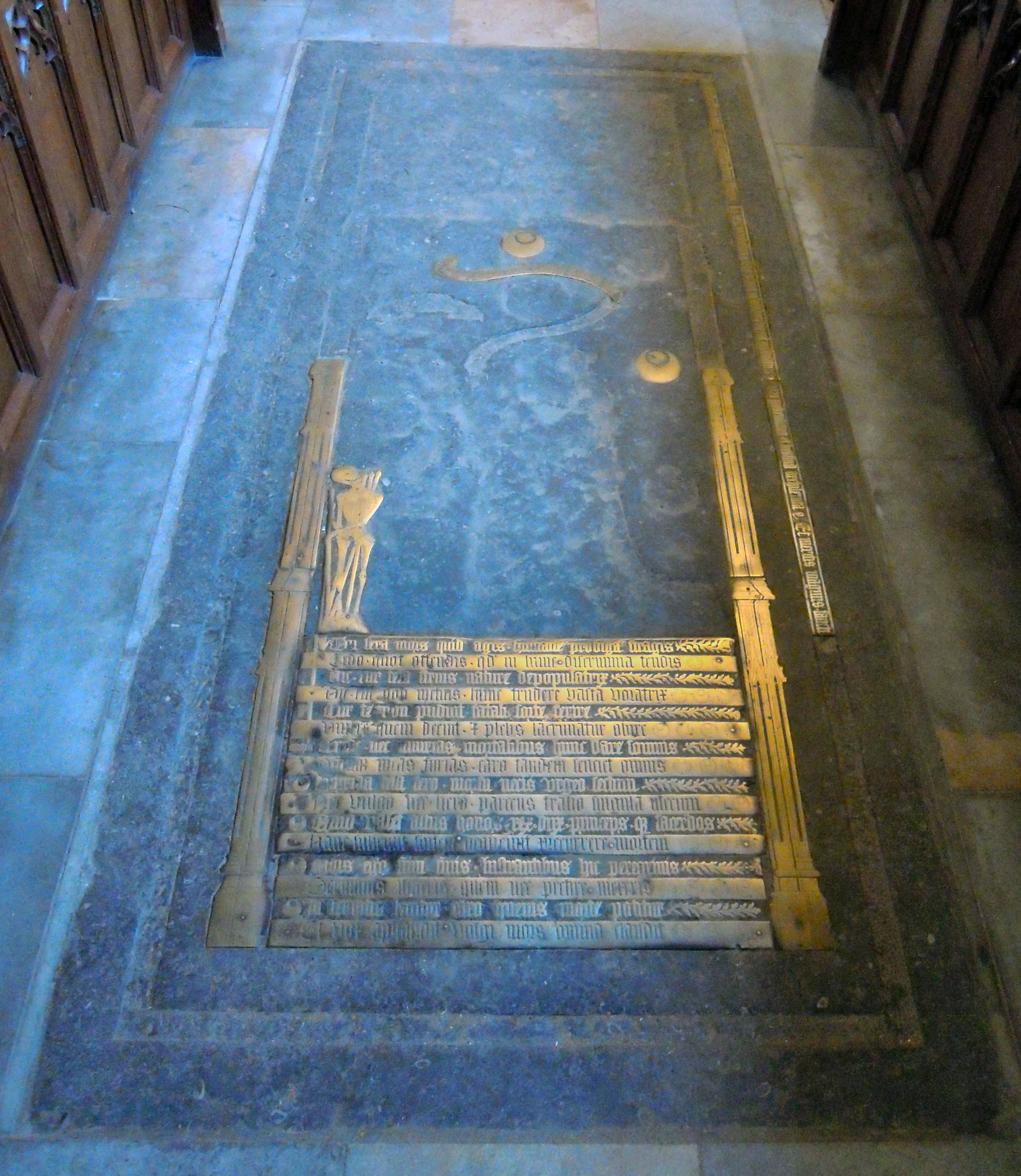
Full length tomb slab showing the remains of the monumental brass of 1481

The monumental brass of John Rudying is a brass of 1481 to Archdeacon John Rudying in the Church of St Andrew in Biggleswade in Bedfordshire noted for the surviving Figure of Death. The monument was rediscovered under the chancel floor in 1955 during restoration and has been described as "very remarkable" by English Heritage.

== Archdeacon John Rudying ==
In the centre of the floor of the chancel in St Andrew's church are the remains of a "very remarkable" monumental brass to Archdeacon John Rudying (died 1481) who is said to have rebuilt or refurbished the chancel of the church at his own expense in about 1470. In 1471 he donated a Bible in Latin manuscript, said to be of c.1320 or earlier, to the Parish Church of St. Peter and St. Paul in Buckingham which was later taken away and subsequently restored to the parish.

Rudying held a large number of ecclesiastical offices, many of them simultaneously, including Prebendary of Biggleswade in Lincoln Cathedral, Archdeacon of Bedford, Vicar of St Michael the Archangel in Gloucester, Archdeacon of Stow, Archdeacon of Northampton and Archdeacon of Lincoln. Despite all these pluralist offices Rudying clearly chose to be buried in St Andrew's in Biggleswade by setting down so large a tomb. Perhaps it was his intention to be buried in the centre of the chancel he had rebuilt or at the least had restored; however, he is actually buried in Buckingham.

== Memento mori ==
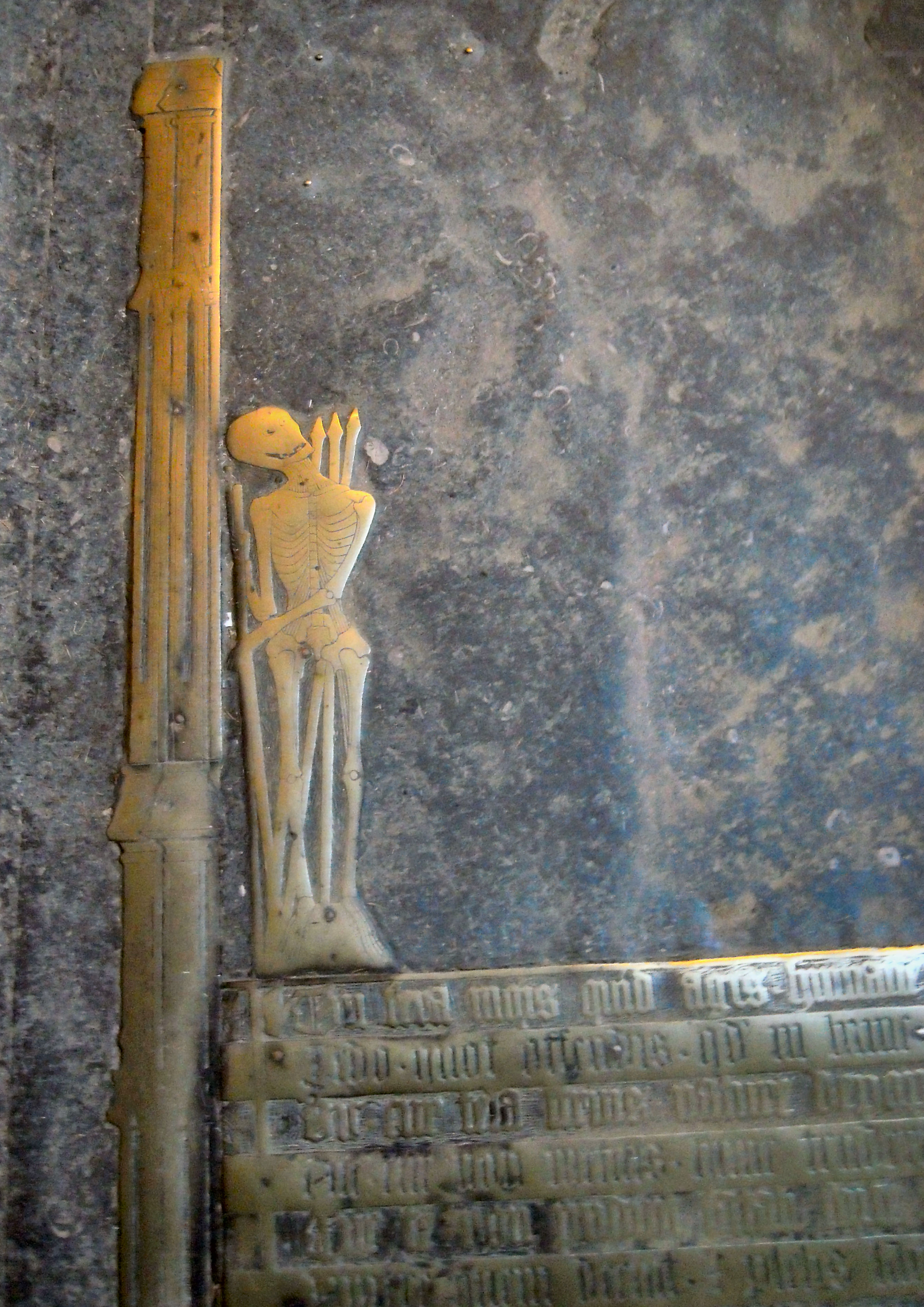
Detail of the Figure of Death on the monumental brass of John Rudying

The monument's brass has a Latin inscription between the lost figure of Rudying and the Figure of Death, which is poised to strike Rudying with a spear. The brass is "in the tradition of the memento mori in that, despite Rudying's self-proclaimed accomplishments, Death points out that all men come to the same end." It is perhaps an indication of Rudying's modesty that, despite his many achievements, he chose to put such a memorial on his tomb.

== Scholarly history ==
This is the same memorial that was said to have been destroyed during the restoration of St Andrew's Church in 1870. The archaeologist Herbert Haines (1861) described the brass as lying in a large Purbeck Marble slab in the middle of the chancel, measuring 11.5 by 5.5 feet (3.5 m × 1.7 m), with the effigy of Archdeacon Rudying and the canopy with Saints John the Baptist, Anna, Elizabeth, and Mary of Egypt being destroyed. The figures of Death and angels and a Latin inscription in sixteen verses and a largely damaged marginal inscription in ten Latin verses survived. Haines added that the slab was decorated with crescents and escallops of which only two survive. The now lost figure of Archdeacon Rudying was originally kneeling before Death.

The antiquarian Richard Gough in his epic work Sepulchral Monuments in Great Britain gave an entire page to the monument in his second volume, illustrating it in a drawing by Jacob Schnebbelie and the engraving by Barak Longmate.

Nikolaus Pevsner in his The Buildings of England: Bedfordshire, the County of Huntingdon and Peterborough (1968) states that the surviving brass fragments on the monument were found in 1955 after a fire in the church caused the damaged tiles laid on the chancel floor during the restoration in 1870 to be lifted, revealing the tomb below.
