= John Pope (travel writer) =

John Pope (c. 1754 – January 31, 1795) was an American soldier, traveler, and author of the book A Tour through the Southern and Western Territories of the United States of North-America. The book attracted little notice during Pope's lifetime but is valued by historians for its first-hand descriptions of the frontiers of the early United States, including the Spanish provinces of Luisiana and the Floridas as well as the Creek Nation.

== Early life and military career ==
John Pope, author of A Tour, was the eldest son of Nathaniel Pope IV (1729–1806) and his wife, Lucy Smith (Fox) Pope (1732–1789) of Louisa County, Virginia. Evidence from A Tour suggests that John Pope was well educated, and tax records imply that he was wealthy, with more than 700 acres of land in his name. He married Lucy DuVal of Henrico County, Virginia, a daughter of Samuel and Lucy (Claiborne) DuVal in 1775 or 1776. By 1792 they had three children named Alexander, Lucinda, and Anne. Lucy (DuVal) Pope was probably deceased by the time John Pope published A Tour in 1792.

In A Tour, Pope wrote that he lived in Amherst County, Virginia during the American Revolution. Deed records indicate that he lived in Amherst County from 1778 until 1790. He has been tentatively identified with a John Pope Jr. who served as an officer in the militia from that county. In June 1781 this John Pope attained the rank of lieutenant colonel. His battalion took part in battles at Lynch's Ferry, Cowpens, Rockfish Gap, and Jamestown. At the siege of Yorktown this battalion was merged with the "Main Army" commanded by the Marquis de Lafayette.

Pope probably returned to Amherst County after the war, then sold his property and moved to the Richmond area in about 1790. On June 1, 1790, John Pope set out on the tour that he would later record in his book. John Pope died in Augusta, Georgia on January 31, 1795.

=== Namesakes ===
John Pope, the author, has often been confused with his cousin, also named John Pope. This namesake was born in 1749 in either Westmoreland or Prince William County, Virginia. He lived in Prince William County for most of his life before moving his family to Wilkes County, Georgia, in late 1800 or early 1801. This John Pope died in Wilkes County, Georgia, in the summer of 1802.

The John Pope who settled in Georgia was a first cousin, once removed, of John Pope the author. Worden Pope (1700–1749), the father of John Pope of Prince William County, was a brother of John Pope (ca. 1695–1735), the grandfather of the John Pope who wrote A Tour.

== Pope's travels ==
Leaving Richmond on June 1, 1790, Pope traveled across Virginia to Redstone on the Monongahela River. He visited former Revolutionary War generals Daniel Morgan, Horatio Gates, and Adam Stephen, as well as Charles Washington. In October he reached Pittsburgh, where he remained ten days to recover from illness. In November he went down the Ohio River to Kentucky, staying a month at Danville. In Louisville he visited George Rogers Clark and remained in the city through February.

By the first of March 1791, Pope set out down the Ohio and Mississippi rivers with a French boatman, arriving at New Madrid on March 4 and dining with the Spanish commandant. Continuing down the Mississippi, Pope met Manuel Gayoso de Lemos, the Spanish governor of Luisiana. After stopping for a week at Natchez, Pope continued downriver to New Orleans, where he stayed six weeks.

In mid-May Pope sailed from New Orleans to Pensacola, capital of the Spanish province of West Florida. Arturo O'Neill, one of the Irish-born governors of West Florida, sent Pope northward with an escort of eleven Creek Indians to visit the Creek Indian leader Alexander McGillivray in what is now Alabama. Late in June, Pope struck out eastward across Georgia to Augusta and Savannah.

Pope sailed from Savannah to Charleston, South Carolina, arriving August 1. On the voyage he met Senator Pierce Butler. From Charleston he soon sailed south to St. Marys, Georgia and tried to enter Spanish East Florida, but was turned back. From St. Marys he took a ship to New York City on September 2.

On the final leg of his journey, Pope traveled across New Jersey to Philadelphia, at that time the seat of government for the United States. On October 5 he had a meeting with Henry Knox, the secretary of war.

=== Motives for the journey ===
Pope's motives for the 16-month journey are uncertain. He told Secretary of War Knox that he had explored the southern country as an agent of the Virginia Yazoo Company, which speculated in lands claimed by the state of Georgia. The land company was founded by fellow Virginians Patrick Henry and David Ross; however, according to historian J. Barton Starr, there is no compelling evidence that Pope was ever involved with the company. Starr concluded that the "most obvious explanation" for Pope's journey was "intellectual curiosity and a desire for excitement."

McGillivray, the Creek political leader who met Pope in June 1791, surmised that the Virginian was touring the South in order to spy on Spanish military posts and gain information about the Indians. McGillivray wrote to the Spanish about his suspicion of Pope. In response, the captain-general of Havana described Pope as a "despicable adventurer" and ordered reprimands for the Spanish commanders at Natchez, New Orleans, and Pensacola, who had let the strange American have unrestricted access to their posts.

== Pope's book ==
John Dixon, editor of the Virginia Gazette and Public Advertiser, printed Pope's book in November or December 1792. The book's full title is A Tour through the Southern and Western Territories of the United States of North-America; the Spanish Dominions on the River Mississippi, and the Floridas; the Countries of the Creek Nations; and Many Uninhabited Parts.

Pope's book contains several short occasional poems, most of them satirical. The last of these is an homage to Henry Knox, Attorney-General Edmund Randolph, and Samuel Pleasants, a Philadelphia merchant.

=== Reception ===
The book received little critical attention and was not reprinted during the author's lifetime. A copy preserved in the University of Virginia library has a hand-written note on the last page, presumably left by an early reader: "Pope you are a damned fool."

Nevertheless, by the late 1800s, historians looking for scarce first-hand accounts of the colonial American South became interested in Pope's book, which by then had become very rare.

=== Reprints ===
In 1888, New York book dealer Charles L. Woodward printed a small edition of Pope's Tour with a new index. Despite this new edition, the book remained rare and obscure through most of the twentieth century.

In 1971 the Arno Press printed a facsimile of the 1792 edition that was purchased by many American libraries. In 1979 the University Press of Florida published a facsimile edition of Pope's Tour with an introduction and indexes by historian J. Barton Starr.

In 1985 the book was reproduced on microfiche by Readex Microprint as part of that company's Early American Imprints series.

== See also ==
- John Pope (disambiguation)
