= John Taylor (archdeacon of Leicester) =

English cleric (1711–1772)

John Taylor, D.D. (6 July 1711 – 29 August 1772) was an English priest.

Taylor was born in Kiddington, and matriculated at Christ Church, Oxford, in 1730; he graduated M.A. in 1743, B. & D.D. in 1752. He was Archdeacon of Bedford from 1745 until 1756, and Archdeacon of Leicester from then until his death at Salisbury.
