= Frederic Cockin =

Bishop of Bristol (1888–1969)

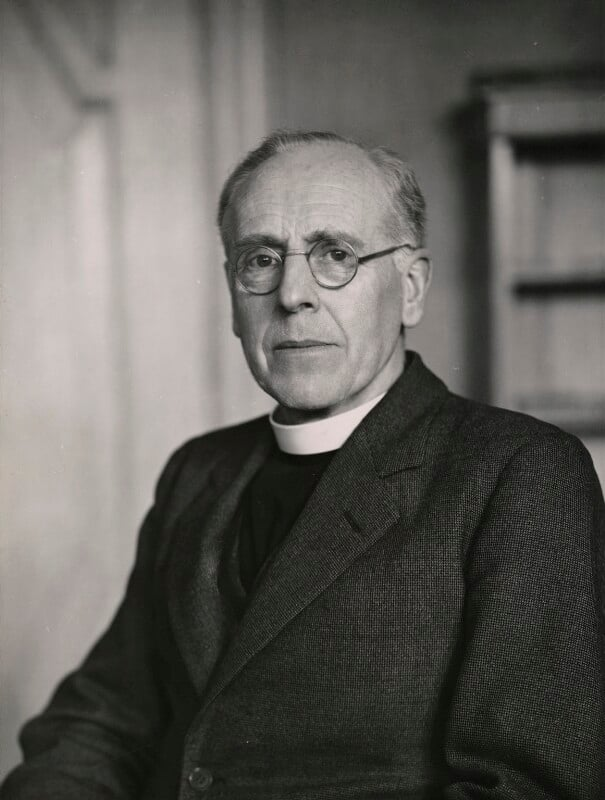
Cockin in 1946

Frederic Arthur Cockin (30 July 1888– 15 January 1969) was a British bishop in the Church of England. He was Bishop of Bristol in the mid 20th century.

Born in 1888, Cockin was educated at Marlborough College and University College, Oxford. He was ordained in 1915, after which he was curate of St Mary's Newington. Later he was vicar of the University Church of St Mary the Virgin, Oxford, then a canon at St Paul's Cathedral and an Honorary Chaplain to the King, He was ordained to the episcopate in 1946 and served for 12 years. He died on 15 January 1969.

Church of England titles
| Preceded by Clifford Woodward | Bishop of Bristol; 1946–1958 | Succeeded by Oliver Stratford Tomkins |
