= Clifford Woodward =

Bishop of Bristol

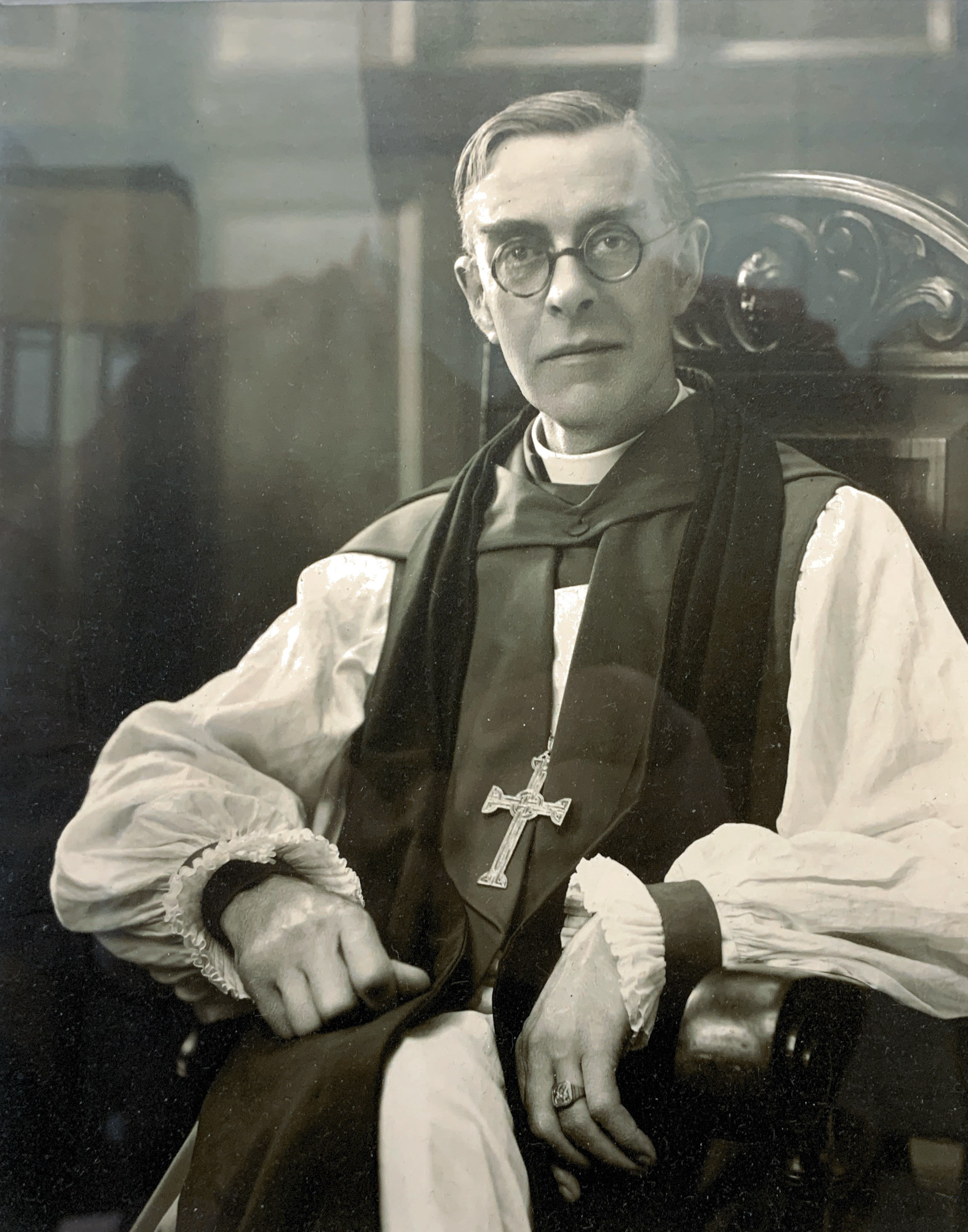
Bishop Clifford Salisbury Woodward

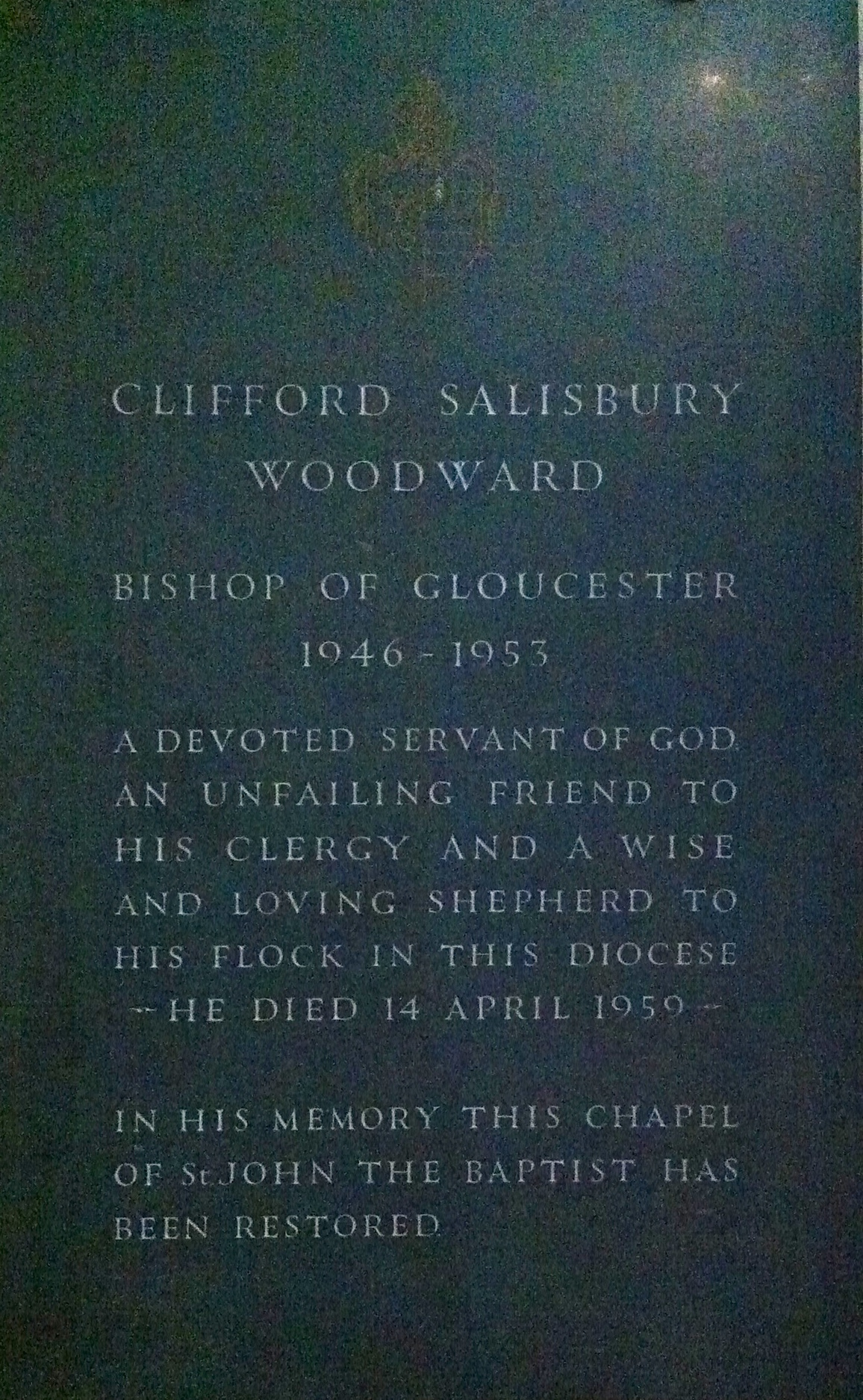
Memorial to Woodward in Gloucester Cathedral

Clifford Salisbury Woodward MC (12 August 1878 – 14 April 1959) was Bishop of Bristol from 1933 to 1946 and Bishop of Gloucester from 1946 to 1953.

== Life ==
Woodward was educated at Marlborough School and Jesus College, Oxford, obtaining a second-class degree in Literae Humaniores in 1901. He was made deacon on Trinity Sunday (25 May) 1902 and ordained priest the next Trinity (7 June 1903) — both times by Edward Talbot, Bishop of Rochester, at Rochester Cathedral. After ordination, he served as lecturer at Wycliffe Hall, Oxford and chaplain of Wadham College, Oxford before becoming rector of St Saviour's with St Peter's, Southwark.

During the Great War, Woodward was a Temporary Chaplain to the Forces for three and a half years from May, 1916. He wrote of his experiences in or near the front lines, in a series of letters published in the Southwark Diocesan Chronicle, published monthly. He was in the front line just one week after leaving his London Rectory, and witnessed bursting shells, rockets, long and twisting communication trenches and an underground hospital. He was attached to the 142nd Brigade in the Battle of the Somme, and was wounded in the thigh and hands on 10 October 1916. He was evacuated to England where he learned that he had been awarded the Military Cross, the citation for which appeared in The London Gazette in November and reads as follows:

For conspicuous gallantry and devotion to duty during operations. He tended and brought in wounded under very heavy shell-fire, and continued this gallant work for 36 hours without stopping. He showed an utter disregard of danger, and gave confidence and relief to many.

On his recovery, he was sent to Murren in Switzerland, a camp for former POWs in Germany deemed medically unfit for service. Woodward described it as 'a prison in paradise'. He returned to Southwark in 1917 but War wounds continued to give him problems, so he moved to a less stressful post in 1919 as Vicar of Cranley Gardens.

By 1923, he had recovered sufficiently to be offered the post of Bishop of Peterborough but he did not, at that stage, want to be a bishop. Instead, in 1925, he moved to St Peter's, Smith Square, where he acquired a reputation for preaching to the young and for religious broadcasts In 1933, he was prevailed upon to accept the bishopric of Bristol by which time he was also a Canon of Westminster Abbey. He was consecrated a bishop on Ascension Day (25 May) 1933 by Cosmo Lang, Archbishop of Canterbury, at Westminster Abbey.

Woodward's reputation as a social reformer meant that he was considered for translation to more senior bishoprics but the death of his wife in 1939 and the loss of his home and possessions in a German air raid discouraged him from leaving Bristol. He was, nevertheless, supported for Winchester in 1942 and London in 1945, but he was by then 67 and regarded as too elderly for such an enormous undertaking. The Prime Minister, Clement Attlee, himself interviewed Woodward for the vacancy at Gloucester, was impressed and offered Woodward the post, which he accepted. His nomination was announced on 30 November 1945, his election was confirmed between 8 February and 13 March 1946, and he was enthroned at Gloucester Cathedral by Alexander Sargent, Archdeacon of Canterbury, on 18 March. Woodward remained in Gloucester until 1952 and died on 14 April 1959 at his home, near Wells, Somerset.

He was a bishop who was seen to have socialist leanings, and his left-wing credentials were much admired in what was regarded as a conservative, traditional Church of England.

Church of England titles
Preceded by George Nickson	Bishop of Bristol; 1933–1946	Succeeded by Frederic Cockin
Preceded by Arthur Headlam	Bishop of Gloucester; 1946–1953	Succeeded by Wilfred Askwith
