= Monumental brass =

Type of church memorial

Monumental brass of Thomas Rowley and wife Margaret (died 1470-78) at the Church of St John the Baptist, Bristol

A monumental brass is a kind of funerary monument associated with Medieval and Early modern Europe. It consists of a metal element, often engraved with a portrait, coat of arms, or text, in hard latten or sheet brass which is inlaid into a flat stone base typically in the floor of a church. Common between the 13th and 16th centuries, they became one of the most common form of church monument throughout Western Europe.

Besides their value as historical monuments, monumental brasses provide contemporary evidence of the varieties of armour and costume, peculiarities of palaeography and heraldic designs, and are often the only authoritative records of intricate details of family history.

Although the intrinsic value of the metal has contributed to the spoliation of these monuments, they are still found in significant numbers in England and were at one time equally common in France, Germany and the Low Countries.

== Locations ==
=== England ===
The majority of extant memorial brasses are now found in England, where it is calculated that there may be about 4,000 still remaining in various churches. They are most abundant in the eastern counties of England, and this fact has been frequently adduced in support of the opinion that they were of Flemish manufacture. At the time when sepulchral brasses were most often fashioned, these eastern counties were a centre of commercial activity and wealth, and there are numerous engraved memorials of civilians and prosperous merchants in the churches of Ipswich, Norwich, King's Lynn and Lincoln. Flemish brasses can be found in England, but they are not common, and they are readily distinguished from English workmanship. The Flemish examples have the figures engraved in the centre of a large plate, the background filled in with diapered or scroll work, and the inscription placed round the edge of the plate. The English examples have the figures cut out to the outline and inserted in corresponding cavities in the slab, the darker colour of the stone serving as a background. This is not an invariable distinction, however, as figure-brasses of Flemish origin are found both at Bruges and in England, but the character of the engraving is constant, the Flemish work being more florid in design, the lines shallower, and the broad lines cut with a chisel-pointed tool instead of the lozenge-shaped burin. The brass of Robert Hallum, bishop of Salisbury, the envoy of King Henry V to the Council of Constance, who died and was interred there in 1416, precisely resembles the brasses of England in the details which distinguish them from styles elsewhere in Europe.

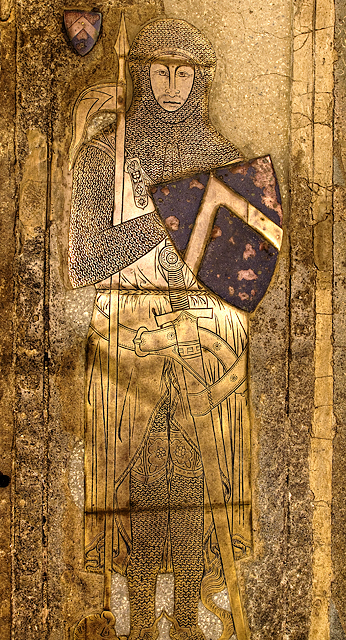
Detail of the monumental brass of Sir John D'Abernon the Elder, at St Mary's Church, Stoke d'Abernon (Surrey)

No surviving brasses in England can be dated earlier than the late 13th century, the earliest known brass in England was the now lost cross brass to John Beauchamp (d. 1208) in St Paul's Church, Bedford. Early examples that do survive include a fragment from the brass to Bishop Thomas de Cantilupe (d. 1282) in Hereford Cathedral; and brasses to Margaret de Camoys (d. 1310) at Trotton, West Sussex; Joan de Cobham (c. 1310) at Cobham, Kent; Archbishop William Greenfield (d. 1315) in York Minster; Sir William de Setvans (c. 1323) at Chartham, Kent; and Sir Roger de Trumpington (c. 1326) in Trumpington, Cambridgeshire. The life-sized brass of Sir John d'Aubernon II (d. 1277) at St Mary's Church, Stoke d'Abernon in Surrey has the decorations of the shield filled in with a species of enamel. Other examples of this occur, and the probability is that, in most cases, the lines of the engraving were filled with colouring matter, though brass would scarcely bear the heat requisite to fuse the ordinary enamels. Like three-dimensional effigies of the same period in stone and wood, several early 14th-century military brasses (including those of Setvans, Trumpington and d'Aubernon mentioned above) depict their subjects with crossed legs, but there is no substance to the long-established myth that this pose identifies the deceased as a crusader.

Brasses become more numerous through the 14th century, and present great variety in their details. A good example is that of Nicholas Lord Burnell (d. 1382) in the church of Acton Burnell, Shropshire. In the 15th century the design and execution of monumental brasses had attained their highest excellence. The brass of Thomas de Beauchamp, 12th Earl of Warwick (d. 1401), and his wife Margaret, which formerly covered the tomb in St Mary's church, Warwick, is a striking example. One of the best specimens of plate armour is that of Sir Robert Stantoun (1458) in Castle Donington church, Leicestershire, and one of the finest existing brasses of ecclesiastics is that of Thomas de la Mare, Abbot of St Albans Abbey from 1349 to 1396. An interesting monumental brass of John Rudying dated 1481 in the Church of St Andrew in Biggleswade shows the figure of Death about to strike Archdeacon Rudying with a spear.

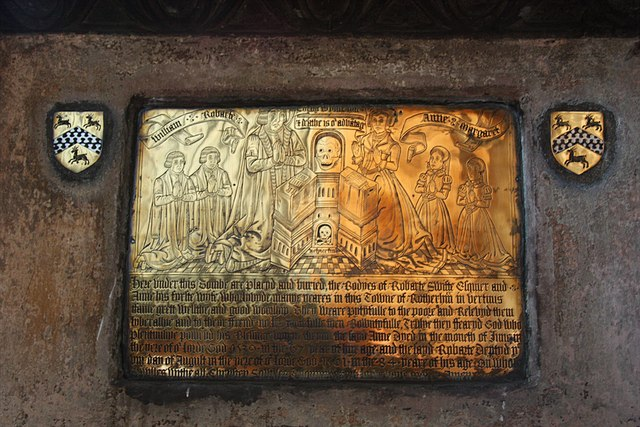
Memorial brass of the Swift family, 16th century, All Saints' Church, Rotherham, South Yorkshire. They were later owners of Broom Hall, Sheffield

It is only in the 16th century that the engraved representations become portraits. Previous to that period the features were invariably represented conventionally, though sometimes personal peculiarities were added. A large number of brasses in England are palimpsests, the back of an ancient brass having been engraved for the more recent memorial. Thus a brass commemorative of Margaret Bulstrode (1540) at Hedgerley in Buckinghamshire, on being removed from its position, was discovered to have been previously the memorial of Thomas Totyngton, abbot of St Edmundsbury (1312). The abbey was only surrendered to Henry VIII in 1539, so that before the year was out the work of spoliation had begun, and the abbot's brass had been removed and re-engraved to Margaret Bulstrode. These ancient brasses were often stolen and re-erected after being engraved on the reverse, as at Berkhampstead, because until the establishment of a manufactory at Esher in Surrey by a German artisan in 1649, all sheet brass had to be imported from other countries on the European mainland.

Jamestown Church in Virginia, built by English colonists in the early 17th century, contains a unique example of an American brass. The inlay itself has been lost, but the ledger stone survives and shows the imprint of a coat of arms and a knight in armour, believed to be Virginia governor George Yeardley (d. 1627).

=== Scotland ===
Only two or three examples of monumental brasses, and these of late date, are known in Scotland, among which are the memorials of Alexander Cockburn (1564) at Ormiston, east of Edinburgh; of the regent James Stewart, 1st Earl of Moray (1569) in St Giles' Cathedral, Edinburgh; and of the Minto family (1605) in Glasgow Cathedral. The Earl of Moray had been assassinated, and his monumental brass carries the Moray arms and figures representing Religion and Justice.

=== Continental Europe ===
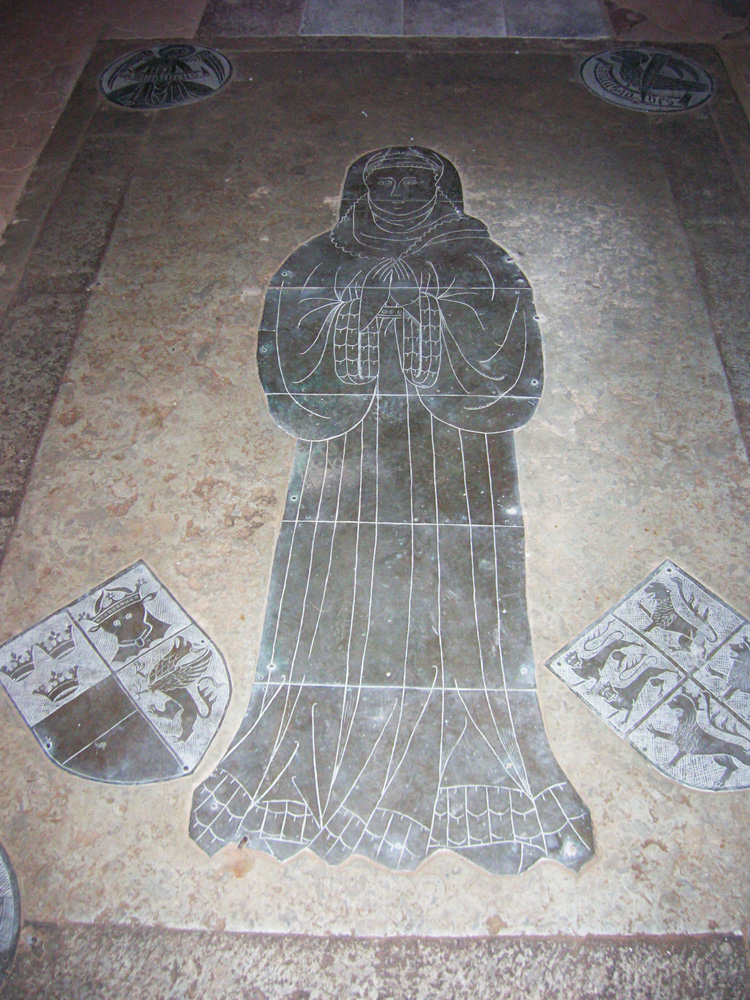
Monumental brass for Agnes of Brunswick-Lüneburg (died c.1430) in the City Church of St Jacob and St Dionysus at Gadebusch (Germany)

Monumental brasses were once common across Western Europe but many have been destroyed. Many French monumental brasses that survived the 16th century were destroyed during the Reign of Terror, and almost the only remaining evidence of their existence is supplied by the collection of drawings bequeathed by Richard Gough to the Bodleian Library in Oxford.

The fine memorials of the royal house of Saxony in the Meissen and Freiberg cathedrals are the most artistic and striking brasses in Germany. Among the 13th-century examples existing in German churches are the full-length memorials of Yso von Welpe, Prince-Bishop of Verden (1231), and of Bernard, bishop of Paderborn (1340).

Many fine Flemish specimens exist in Belgium, especially at Bruges.

== Modern brasses ==
There was a revival of interest in monumental brasses in the 19th century. Among many other examples, Victorian brasses can be seen at Truro Cathedral (Archbishop Benson), Oscott College, Birmingham (Bishop John Milner), St. Nicolas', Guildford (Rev. W. S. Sanders), and All Saints, Boyne Hill, Maidenhead (Rev. Gresley and Canon Drummond). The tradition has continued into the 20th and even the 21st centuries. Recent examples have included a brass commemorating Earl Mountbatten of Burma (d. 1979) and his wife Edwina (d. 1960) in Westminster Abbey, unveiled in 1985; and a medieval-style brass to Master Thomas de Aston (d. 1401) in St Edmund's Chapel, Spital-in-the-Street, Lincolnshire, unveiled in 2001.

== Lists and catalogues ==
Remains of the incised stone funerary monument of Bishop John Chadworth (died 1471), at Lincoln Cathedral from which the metal elements have been stolen or lost leaving only the incised stone base.

Numerous lists of medieval and post-medieval brasses have been published. The standard national list for examples in Britain up to 1710 remains Mill Stephenson's A List of Monumental Brasses in the British Isles, first published in 1926. It is still common practice in the specialist literature for individual brasses to be identified by place-name and an "M.S." number.

On many points of detail, however, Stephenson's List is now seriously dated, and its cut-off date of 1710 means that it omits all more modern brasses. An "Appendix" to Stephenson by M. S. Giuseppi and Ralph Griffin, containing numerous revisions, was published in 1938; and in 1964 Stephenson's List and the Appendix were reprinted by the Monumental Brass Society as a single volume. More recent lists for certain individual counties have also been published, including a volume on Warwickshire edited by S. A. Budd, published by the Monumental Brass Society in 1977, which was devised as the first instalment in a "Revised List of Monumental Brasses in the British Isles" (updating Stephenson). However, no further volumes in this series came to fruition.

In 1992 the Monumental Brass Society began to publish a new fully illustrated "County Series" for England, edited by William Lack, Martin Stuchfield and Philip Whittemore, to cover brasses of all periods, and intended to supersede Stephenson. This has progressed county-by-county on an alphabetical basis, beginning with Bedfordshire in 1992, and reaching Huntingdonshire by 2012. (Cumberland and Westmorland were published as a single volume in 1998; while Essex was published in two volumes in 2003.) For those counties that have been published, the County Series volumes are now regarded as the definitive catalogue. Where appropriate, entries retain Stephenson's "M.S." numbers.

Hugh Cameron published a list of monumental brasses in continental Europe in 1970.

== See also ==
- Brass rubbing
- Monumental brasses of Gloucestershire

== Sources ==
- Coleman, Caryl (1907). "Memorial Brasses" . In Herbermann, Charles (ed.). Catholic Encyclopedia. Vol. 2. New York: Robert Appleton Company.

== Bibliography ==
- Badham, Sally; Norris, Malcolm (1999). Early Incised Slabs and Brasses from the London Marblers. London: Society of Antiquaries of London. ISBN 0854312722.
- Badham, Sally; Stuchfield, Martin (2009). Monumental Brasses. Botley: Shire Publications. ISBN 978-0-7478-0677-6.
- Bertram, Jerome, ed. (1976). Lost Brasses. Newton Abbot: David and Charles. ISBN 9780715371411.
- Bertram, Jerome, ed. (1996). Monumental Brasses as Art and History. Stroud: Alan Sutton. ISBN 9780750910514.
- Boutell, Charles (1847). Monumental Brasses and Slabs: an historical and descriptive notice of the incised monumental memorials of the middle ages. London: Bell.
- Boutell, Charles (1849). The Monumental Brasses of England: a series of engravings upon wood, from every variety of these interesting and valuable memorials. London: Bell.]
- Cameron, H. K. (1970). A List of Monumental Brasses on the Continent of Europe. Newport Pagnell: Monumental Brass Society. ISBN 0950129801.
- Clayton, Muriel (1929). Catalogue of Rubbings of Brasses and Incised Slabs (2nd ed.). London: Victoria and Albert Museum.
- Coales, John, ed. (1987). The Earliest English Brasses: patronage, style and workshops, 1270–1350. London: Monumental Brass Society. ISBN 0-9501298-5-2.
- Davis, Cecil T. (1899). The Monumental Brasses of Gloucestershire. London: Phillimore.
- Haines, Herbert (1861). A Manual of Monumental Brasses: comprising an introduction to the study of these memorials and a list of those remaining in the British Isles. Oxford: J. H. and James Parker. (2 vols) Vol. 1
- Harris, O. D. (2010). "Antiquarian attitudes: crossed legs, crusaders and the evolution of an idea". Antiquaries Journal. 90: 401–40. doi:10.1017/s0003581510000053. S2CID 206212438.
- Lewis, J. M. (1974). Welsh Monumental Brasses: a guide. Cardiff: National Museum of Wales. ISBN 0720000548.
- Love, Dane (1989). Scottish Kirkyards (1989 ed.). London: Robert Hale. ISBN 0-7090-3667-1.
- Meara, David (1983). Victorian Memorial Brasses. London: Routledge & Kegan Paul. ISBN 0710093128.
- Meara, David (1991). A. W. N. Pugin and the Revival of Memorial Brasses. London: Mansell. ISBN 0720120705.
- Meara, David (2008). Modern Memorial Brasses, 1880–2001. Donington: Shaun Tyas. ISBN 9781900289856.
- Norris, Malcolm (1977). Monumental Brasses: the Memorials. London: Phillips & Page. ISBN 0950394211. (2 vols)
- Norris, Malcolm (1978). Monumental Brasses: the Craft. London: Faber and Faber. ISBN 0571098916.
- Page-Phillips, John (1978) [1969]. Macklin's Monumental Brasses. London: Allen & Unwin. ISBN 0-04-739008-5. (a revised and updated edition of Herbert W. Macklin's Monumental Brasses, first published in 1890, and which ran through many subsequent editions)
- Page-Phillips, John (1980). Palimpsests: the backs of monumental brasses. London: Monumental Brass Society. ISBN 0950129844.
- Stephenson, Mill (1964) [1926]. Giuseppi, M. S.; Griffin, Ralph (eds.). A List of Monumental Brasses in the British Isles. London: Monumental Brass Society.
- Waller, J. G.; Waller, L. A. B. (2001). Hutchinson, Robert (ed.). Drawings of Monumental Brasses and Incised Slabs by the Waller Brothers, 1837–1844. London: Monumental Brass Society. ISBN 0952331586.
