= Donald Harris (priest) =

Donald Bertram Harris (4 August 1904 – 20 January 1996) was Archdeacon of Bedford from 1946 to 1955.

Harris was educated at King's College School, Cambridge, Haileybury and King's College, Cambridge. He began his ecclesiastical career with curacies at Chesterfield Parish Church and the Church of St Mary the Less, Cambridge after which he was Rector of Holy Cross Great Greenford until he became an Archdeacon. Following his years in Bedford he was Vicar of St Paul's Church, Knightsbridge until his retirement in 1978.

Church of England titles
Preceded by William Robins	Archdeacon of Bedford; 1946–1955	Succeeded by Basil Guy
