= Dave Middlebrook =

- Archdeacon of Bedford
- Diocese: Diocese of St Albans
- In office: 30 March 2019 – present
- Predecessor: Paul Hughes
- Other post: Priest-in-charge/Vicar of Watford (2008–2019)

Orders
- Ordination: 1998 (deacon); 1999 (priest) by Christopher Herbert

Personal details
- Born: 1961 (age 64–65)
- Denomination: Anglican
- Spouse: Anne (m. 1987)
- Children: 2
- Education: distribution manager (former)
- Alma mater: Newcastle University

David John Middlebrook (born 1961) is an Anglican priest and the Archdeacon of Bedford, in the Church of England Diocese of St Albans.

== Education and training ==
Middlebrook graduated from Newcastle University with a Bachelor of Science (BSc) in 1983 and from Cranfield Institute of Technology with a Master of Science (MSc) in 1985. His Masters was in "Distribution Technology and Management" and he worked for National Freight, based in Bedford; he married Anne in 1987 and they have two children. Middlebrook worked for The Leprosy Mission from 1993 - 1996. Dave then trained for the ministry at Trinity College Bristol from 1996 - 1998, graduating with a Bachelor of Arts (BA).

== Ministry ==
Middlebrook was made deacon at Petertide 1998 (28 June) and ordained a priest the Petertide following (4 July 1999) — both times by Christopher Herbert, Bishop of St Albans, at St Albans Cathedral. His entire ministry has been exercised in the Diocese of St Albans: after a curacy at Chorleywood (1998–2002), he served as a Team Vicar (for Adeyfield) in the Hemel Hempstead Team Ministry.

He moved to Watford in 2008 to serve as parish priest (as priest-in-charge until 2012, and thereafter as vicar, a purely legal distinction); he has additionally been Rural Dean of Watford since 2009 and an honorary canon of St Albans Cathedral since 2013. On 18 November 2018, it was announced that he was to become Archdeacon of Bedford from he was collated on 30 March 2019.

Church of England titles
| Preceded by Paul Hughes | Archdeacon of Bedford; 2019–present | Incumbent |
