= Bishop of Wolverhampton =

Area bishop in the Church of England

The Bishop of Wolverhampton is an episcopal title used by a suffragan bishop of the Church of England Diocese of Lichfield, in the Province of Canterbury, England. The title takes its name after the city of Wolverhampton in the West Midlands; the See was erected under the Suffragans Nomination Act 1888 by Order in Council dated 6 February 1979. The Bishop of Wolverhampton has particular episcopal oversight of the parishes in the Archdeaconries of Lichfield and Walsall. The bishops suffragan of Wolverhampton have been area bishops since the Lichfield area scheme was erected in 1992.

== List of bishops ==
Bishops of Wolverhampton
From	Until	Incumbent	Notes
1979	1985	Barry Rogerson	Translated to Bristol
1985	1993	Christopher Mayfield	First area bishop from 1992; translated to Manchester
1993	2007	Michael Bourke	Son-in-law of Ludwig Bieler
2007	2023	Clive Gregory	Retired 30 April 2023.
2024	Present	Tim Wambunya	Installed 15 October 2024. Previously consecrated as Bishop of Butere (Kenya).
