= Barry Rogerson =

British Anglican bishop (1936–2026)

The Right Reverend Barry Rogerson
- Bishop of Bristol
- Rogerson in 1994
- Church: Church of England
- Diocese: Diocese of Bristol
- Installed: 1985
- Term ended: 2002 (retirement)
- Predecessor: John Tinsley
- Successor: Mike Hill
- Other posts: Honorary assistant bishop in the Diocese of Bath and Wells; 2002–present Bishop of Wolverhampton; 1979–1985

Orders
- Ordination: 1962 (deacon); 1963 (priest)
- Consecration: 1979

Personal details
- Born: 25 July 1936
- Died: 20 August 2026 (aged 90)
- Denomination: Anglican
- Occupation: Bishop
- Education: University of Leeds

Member of the House of Lords
- Lord Spiritual
- Bishop of Bristol; 2 May 1990 – 30 November 2002

Barry Rogerson (25 July 1936 – 20 August 2026) was a British Anglican bishop. He was the first Bishop of Wolverhampton from 1979 to 1985 and, from then until his retirement in 2002, the Bishop of Bristol. He held honorary degrees from Bristol and the West of England universities. He was made a Freeman of the City and County of Bristol in 2003.

== Early life and career ==
Rogerson was born on 25 July 1936. He was educated at the University of Leeds and Wells Theological College. Initially a bank employee, he was ordained in 1962, after which he held curacies at St Hilda's South Shields and St Nicholas' Bishopwearmouth. From 1967 to 1975 he was a lecturer at Lichfield Theological College and then Salisbury and Wells Theological College, after which he became vicar and subsequently team rector of St Thomas' Church, Wednesfield—a post he held until his ordination to the episcopate.

In 1978 he was seconded for six months to the Anglican Church of Melanesia to teach at Bishop Patteson Theological College at Kohimarama in the Solomon Islands. He served as chairman of the Melanesian Mission in England until his retirement in 2002.

Rogerson was elected as a suffragan bishop to the General Synod of the Church of England and House of Bishops in 1982. During his membership of the general synod he was chairman of the Interfaith Consultancy Group (IFCOG) and continued to be a member of the advisory board of ministry, ultimately becoming its chairman. During his latter years on the board he was instrumental in encouraging the Church of England to take the distinctive diaconate seriously, introducing the report For Such A Time as This to the general synod in 2001.

=== Ecumenism ===
Starting as chairman of Churches Together in Wolverhampton, Rogerson became a member of the World Council of Churches' Faith and Order Commission in 1987, and in 1991 a member of its central committee, a role which he held until his retirement. In 1997 he became a member of Churches Together in Britain and Ireland (CTBI), subsequently becoming one of its presidents. His final contribution was to co-chair with the Reverend John B. Taylor the committee which produced the The Anglican-Methodist Conversations report in 2001.

=== Ordination of women ===
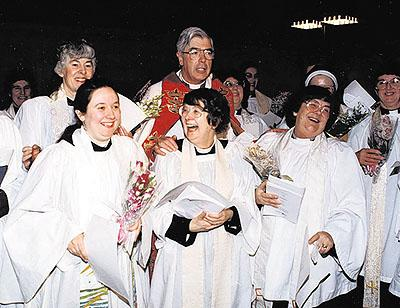
Rogerson with the first women who were ordained priests in 1994

Rogerson was a supporter of the ordination of women to the priesthood since his days as a student at Leeds University. Alongside John Oliver, then Bishop of Hereford, he was a consultant to the Movement for the Ordination of Women. He ordained the first 32 female priests in the Church of England on 12 March 1994 at his cathedral in Bristol.

In retirement he continued to serve as an honorary assistant bishop in the Diocese of Bath and Wells as well as being a governor of the University of the West of England.

== Death ==
Rogerson died on 20 August 2026 aged 90.

== Publications ==
- "Growing Together - Anglican Identity and European Ecumenism", in 2020 Visions, SPCK, 1992
- "Turn to God - Rejoice in Hope Taking Responsibility for Ourselves", in The Ecumenical Review, WCC, 1998
- "The diaconate: Taking the Ecumenical Opportunity", in Community-Unity-Communion, Church House Publishing, 1998
- "Financing the Ministry and Mission of the Church of England", in Evangelische Theologie, 1–2000
- "A Translation of the Church of Norway's Ordination Rites", in Studia Liturgica Vol:31(2) 2001

Church of England titles
Preceded by Inaugural appointment	Bishop of Wolverhampton; 1979–1985	Succeeded by Christopher Mayfield
Preceded by John Tinsley	Bishop of Bristol; 1985–2002	Succeeded by Mike Hill
