= Richard Barber (priest) =

English priest

Richard Barber DCL was an English priest in 16th-century.

A Fellow of All Souls' College, Oxford, he was appointed Vicar choral of Chichester Cathedral in 1541; Vicar of the College of Windsor in 1543, a Canon of Lincoln Cathedral in 1552; Rector of Wappenham in 1553; Archdeacon of Bedford in 1559; Archdeacon of Leicester in 1560. In 1563 he was described as living at Lincoln. He was Warden of All Souls between April 1565 and October 1571 and acted as one of Bishop of Lincoln's commissioners for the visitation of Balliol College, Oxford in the spring of 1566. He was Rector of Harrietsham in Kent, 1570, and of Hanborough in 1572. In 1574 he was appointed Treasurer and Canon of Lichfield Cathedral by James Weston (MP). In 1575 he became Rector of Yoxall. He died on 15 February 1590 and was buried at Yoxall.
