= William Cosyn =

William Cosyn was priest, a JP for Somerset from 1506 to 1516, and Dean of Wells Cathedral from 1498 to 1525.

== Biography ==
William Cosyn was born between 1470 and 1475 in London to Robert Cosyn and his wife Elizabeth (née King). Robert Cosyn was a man of some standing in London. King Edward IV granted Robert the office of Controller of the Scrutiny of good passing through the port of London in 1461, a potentially lucrative position. By 1465, Robert was enough of a gentleman that he styled himself "Esquire", and also served as clerk of the King's Wardrobe. William's mother Elizabeth was the sister of Oliver King, eventual Secretary to Edward IV and Henry VII, and Bishop of Exeter. William had three surviving siblings, Lewis, Robert, and Elizabeth. Lewis attempted to follow his father in the service of the king, with some success, while his brother Robert (b. c. 1474) became a landowner in Somerset. William's sister Elizabeth married Sir John Philpot (d. 1502) in 1488, with a dowry of 400 marks and land in Middlesex from her uncle, Oliver King. Elizabeth had two sons with Philpot, named Piers and William, and managed several land holdings after her husband's death in 1502.

While most of William Cosyn's family left little trace of their lives in the historical record, William made a much clearer imprint. Cosyn was a chorister in the Choir of King's College, Cambridge. He then attended Eton College from 1483 to 1487, and proceeded on as an elected fellow at King's College, Cambridge in 1487. Cosyn likely did not complete a M.A. degree at Cambridge, as he only held the lesser title of licentiate in civil law in 1498. He received his first prebend or living in the church in 1488 when he was granted the Prebend of Bedford Minor in the Diocese of Lincoln. Though Cosyn received and retired from several prebends, vicarages, and offices over the next thirty-seven years, he kept his position at Bedford Minor until his death in 1525. Until 1492, Cosyn's career remained stagnant, partly because he left Cambridge in 1490 to study civil or canon law on the continent.

Cosyn's uncle, Oliver King, began serving as a diplomat and commissioner to King Henry VII soon after Henry's rise to the thrown in 1485. King held several benefices and vicarages in England and northern France as rewards for his services, and in 1492, Henry granted King the greater office of the Bishopric of Exeter. With his new title, King had greater opportunity for patronage of his own, and Cosyn became one of the primary beneficiaries of King. In quick succession from 1492 to 1494, Cosyn received the prebend of Major Pars Altaris in the Diocese of Salisbury, a prebend in Exeter Cathedral, the rectory of St. Clements Danes in London, the position of confrater at the English Hospital of Saint Thomas the Martyr, and the Archdeaconry of Bedford. After three years as Bishop of Exeter, Pope Alexander VI issued a bull to translate King to the Diocese of Bath and Wells.

With King's translation to Bath and Wells, Cosyn reaped the benefits of even more remunerative positions. Cosyn obtained the Archdeaconry of Bath in 1497, the prebend of Ilton in October 1498, and finally the office of Dean of Wells Cathedral in December 1498. Although Cosyn's previous positions appear to be influenced by his uncle's prestige and power, King wrote in a letter after Cosyn's election to the deanship that he had bargained with the King for Cosyn's position. Up to his election as Dean of Wells, Cosyn held all of his positions as a layman. It was not until 10 April 1499 that Cosyn was formally ordained by Bishop René d’Illiers, in Chartres. Despite his ordination and new positions, Cosyn seems to have remained in France until 1502, in order to finish his studies and obtain his M.A. at either Chartres or Paris. Cosyn's meteoric rise to success from 1492 to 1502 was remarkable, but unfortunately, his main star and reason for his success began to burn out the year after his permanent return to England.

Bishop Oliver King died on 29 August 1503. King had looked after William Cosyn and his sister Elizabeth throughout his later life, and both served as executors in his will. No record exists indicating Cosyn's reaction to his uncle's death, but the economic consequences for Cosyn soon became clear. Cosyn did not receive any new benefices after King's death, and he more often than not had to surrender his old positions to new objects of patronage. Cosyn was established at Wells by the time of King's death, and he still held several benefices that he had been granted in the 1490s. Moving forward, Cosyn attempted to gain a greater understanding of his position as Dean, and work towards increasing his social standing on his own. The main result of Cosyn's attempt to understand his Deanery and the lands he was responsible for, was the assembly of a collection of transcripts, statutes, customs, and records on the liberties, rents and procedures of Wells Cathedral in 1505. Included in Cosyn's collection were documents ranging from twelfth century papal bulls confirming the Dean, Chapter and their possessions, to records of Cosyn's own election. Cosyn also during this time managed to become a Chaplain to King Henry VII, and was among the members of clergy that walked in the procession of the King's funeral in 1509. Cosyn also managed to purchase a wardship of a young heiress in 1511 for £5. Wardships were among the most common means of patronage, as wards were heirs to property under the age of twenty-one whose estates were in theory managed by the crown, but in practice the crown sold the right to manage the estate and collect the profits to various clients.

In the period between Bishop King's death and the end of Cosyn's tenure as Dean of Wells, members of the Catholic Church in central Europe suffered some of the most tumultuous years in the history of Western Christianity. After the Excommunication (Catholic Church) of Martin Luther in 1520, central Europeans experienced wave after wave of excessive violence due to the rapidly changing religious landscape. By comparison, England and the English remained perfectly calm in the first quarter of the sixteenth century. Henry VIII had his disputes with Luther over the sacraments, and William Tyndale was working on his translation of the New Testament into English, but little violence erupted because there was a general absence of religious division. Cosyn's Cathedral lands in the county of Somerset were emblematic of the peace England experienced before the later 1520s and 1530s.

Cosyn's largest problems during his later tenure were mainly conflicts over administrative and fiscal problems for the Cathedral, between himself and the Chapter. On 19 August 1510 Cosyn proposed that he would visit the College of chantry priests, likely to ensure that they performed their assigned duties, such as masses for the dead. The Chapter protested stating that the prerogative to visit the college "belonged to the dean and chapter, and not to the dean alone." Cosyn backed down, and the visit was conducted by members of the chapter with the dean instead. Three years later, Cosyn and the Chapter came to a head over the appointment of the Vicar of St. Cuthbert's. The chapter favored a John Caveley, while Cosyn preferred a William Mors. The election became a lawsuit that dragged on for two years, and only ended when the Archbishop of Canterbury, William Warham arbitrated the case, and appointed Caveley as Vicar. The most significant dispute was over Cosyn's attempt to gain a Papal Dispensation that would allow him to receive the First Fruits of his position, without remaining resident for the required eight months each year. Cosyn first was granted permission by the King to petition Pope Leo X for a bull in November 1513. Cosyn had received a dispensation in 1509 to travel outside the Wells Cathedral and receive his First Fruits so long as he resided in the Roman Curia, one of his benefices or cures, or at a University to study. In 1513, Cosyn sought dispensation to receive his First Fruits, while being able to travel on the King's business. The Pope granted Cosyn's request in October 1513. The debate between Cosyn and the Chapter continued on, and the result seems to be that Cosyn won the liberty to perform the King's business, though he had to maintain residency at Wells for six months of the year.

Despite ongoing tensions with his Chapter, Cosyn managed to perform his required duties as Dean, as well as perform additional offices, and properly respond to crown summons. The King appointed Cosyn as one of the Justices of the Peace for Somerset beginning in February 1506. He would continue to serve as a JP until the death of Henry VII, and returned to the courtroom from 1512 to 1514. Cosyn also attended at least two Convocations in 1509, and 1514 in his position as Dean, and to represent the Chapter. Cosyn was also summoned in November, 1511 to a Parliament meeting the following year, but it is not clear if he attended. The last benefice Cosyn added to his already extensive list was the prebendary of Payhembury in Devon in 1516. The remaining years of Cosyn's life after 1519 are nearly blank. He continued to serve as Dean, and did not engage in any additional lawsuits after 1515. Cosyn died at the beginning of 1525. In his will, Cosyn reserved funds for twenty poor men to bear torches for his funeral, and forgave the debt of £40 of one Richard Baker. Despite writing his will in 1523, disputes over inheritance and the distribution of Cosyn's offices pushed back the proved date to July 1531. After Cosyn died his body was interred in Wells Cathedral, but the location is currently unknown.
