= William Robins (priest) =

William Aubrey Robins (23 September 1868 – 22 November 1949) was Archdeacon of Bedford from 1935 to 1945.

Robins was educated at Marlborough and Trinity College, Oxford. He began his ecclesiastical career as a curate at St Mary Redcliffe after which he was a Church Mission Society missionary in British Columbia. He held incumbencies at St Martin's, Bristol and St John the Baptist, Cirencester before his years as an archdeacon.

Church of England titles
Preceded by Gerard Lander	Archdeacon of Bedford; 1935–1945	Succeeded by Donald Harris
