= Michael Bourke =

Bishop of Wolverhampton; Archdeacon of Bedford

The Rt Revd Michael Bourke MA(Cantab)
- Bishop of Wolverhampton
- Diocese: Diocese of Lichfield
- In office: 1993–2007
- Predecessor: Christopher Mayfield
- Successor: Clive Gregory
- Other post: Archdeacon of Bedford (1986–1993)

Orders
- Ordination: c. 1967 (deacon); c. 1968 (priest)
- Consecration: 1993

Personal details
- Born: 28 November 1941 (age 84)
- Denomination: Anglican
- Parents: Gordon & Hilda
- Spouse: Elizabeth Bieler (m. 1968)
- Children: 1 son; 1 daughter
- Education: Corpus Christi College, Cambridge

Michael Gay Bourke (born 28 November 1941) was the second area and third overall Bishop of Wolverhampton from 1993 until 2007.

== Education and career ==
Son of Gordon and Hilda Bourke, Bourke studied Modern Languages at Corpus Christi College, Cambridge and then Theology at Cambridge and Tübingen before training for the ministry at Cuddesdon Theological College. He was ordained in 1967, and began his ordained ministry as a curate at St James’ Grimsby after which he spent 22 years in Hertfordshire and Bedfordshire in the Diocese of St Albans, as priest-in-charge of Panshanger Conventional District (a Local Ecumenical Project) at Welwyn Garden City (1971-1978) and vicar of All Saints, Southill, Bedfordshire (1978-1986), rising to be Archdeacon of Bedford (1986–1993), until his ordination to the episcopate. From 1996 to 2006 he was Anglican Co-Chairman of the Meissen Commission, the body which oversees the relationship between the Church of England and the Protestant Church of Germany (EKD), Bourke has in retirement lived in Hereford diocese, at Little Stretton, Shropshire and is an honorary Assistant Bishop in that diocese (as retired bishops usually are).

== Personal life ==
Bourke married in 1968 Elizabeth Bieler. They have a son and daughter.

Bourke is a keen amateur astronomer, and counts star-gazing as amongst his chief spare-time pursuits. He has been an outspoken advocate of gay rights in both church and society, and has actively opposed institutional homophobia in all organisations, including the Church.

== Awards ==
In 2008 Michael Bourke received the Cross of St Augustine, the second highest international award for outstanding service to the Anglican Church. This was awarded primarily for his services to ecumenism, although the citation also mentioned his work opposing racism and homophobia.

Church of England titles
| Preceded by Christopher Mayfield | Archdeacon of Bedford; 1986–1993 | Succeeded by Malcolm Lesiter |
| Preceded by Christopher Mayfield | Bishop of Wolverhampton; 1993–2007 | Succeeded by Clive Gregory |
