= Malcolm Lesiter =

English curate (1937–2025)

Malcolm Leslie Lesiter (31 January 1937 – 21 November 2025) was an English curate who was Archdeacon of Bedford from 1993 to 2003.

Lesiter was educated at Cranleigh School and Selwyn College, Cambridge. He was ordained in 1964 and began his ordained ministry as a curate in Eastney. He held incumbencies at Hemel Hempstead (1971-73), Leavesden (1973-88), and Radlett (1988-93).

He died in 2025, aged 88.

Church of England titles
Preceded by Michael Bourke	Archdeacon of Bedford; 1993–2003	Succeeded by Paul Hughes
