= Thomas Hutton (priest) =

Thomas Hutton was a Canon of Windsor from 1485 to 1487 and successively Archdeacon of Bedford, Archdeacon of Huntingdon and Archdeacon of Lincoln.

== Career ==
He was appointed:

- Prebendary of York 1485
- Prebendary of Lincoln 1488
- Archdeacon of Bedford 1489
- Archdeacon of Huntingdon 1494
- Archdeacon of Lincoln 1494

He was appointed to the twelfth stall in St George's Chapel, Windsor Castle in 1485, and held the stall until 1487.
