= Christopher Mayfield =

British Anglican bishop

The Right Honourable Christopher Mayfield
- Bishop of Manchester
- Church: Church of England
- Diocese: Diocese of Manchester
- In office: c. 1993 – 2002 (retirement)
- Predecessor: Stanley Booth-Clibborn
- Successor: Nigel McCulloch
- Other post: Honorary assistant bishop in the Diocese of Worcester (2002–present)
- Previous posts: Bishop of Wolverhampton (1985–1993 (area bishop: 1992–1993)); Archdeacon of Bedford (1980–1985)

Orders
- Ordination: 1964
- Consecration: 1985

Personal details
- Born: 18 December 1935 (age 90) Plymouth, Devon, England
- Denomination: Anglican
- Education: Gonville and Caius College, Cambridge
- Military career
- Allegiance: United Kingdom
- Branch: Royal Air Force
- Service years: 1958–1964
- Rank: Flight lieutenant

Member of the House of Lords
- Lord Spiritual
- Bishop of Manchester; 27 January 1998 – 30 September 2002

Christopher John Mayfield (born 18 December 1935) is a British retired Anglican bishop. After studying engineering at university and then serving in the Royal Air Force, he was ordained in the Church of England. He undertook a number of parish posts before serving as Archdeacon of Bedford from 1979 to 1985. He was consecrated a bishop in 1985, and then served as Bishop of Wolverhampton, a suffragan bishop in the Diocese of Lichfield, before ending his career as the Bishop of Manchester from 1993 to 2002.

== Early life and education ==
Mayfield was born 18 December 1935, in Plymouth, Devon, England, but grew up in Worcester, Worcestershire, England. He was educated at Sedbergh School, then an all-boys public school (i.e. independent boarding school) in Sedbergh, Cumbria. He then studied at Gonville and Caius College, Cambridge, where he read Mechanical Sciences.

Following university, he spent four years teaching engineering in the Royal Air Force (RAF). After attending officer training, he was commissioned in the Education Branch of the RAF on 30 January 1958 in the rank of pilot officer. He was promoted to flying officer on 18 December 1958. The period he served in the regular RAF was extended to 30 October 1961, and then he transferred to the Royal Air Force Reserve of Officers on 31 October 1961. He was promoted to flight lieutenant on 17 June 1964, before relinquishing his commission on 22 September 1964, thereby ending his service with the RAF.

== Ordained ministry ==
Mayfield was ordained in the Church of England as a deacon in 1963 and as a priest in 1964. He became a curate at St Martin's in the Bull Ring, Birmingham. He was then a lecturer at the same church before becoming the Vicar of Luton.

He was appointed the Rural Dean of Luton in 1974 and then the Archdeacon of Bedford (1979–1985) before his appointment to the episcopate as the Bishop of Wolverhampton in 1985. He was consecrated as a bishop on 30 November 1985, by Robert Runcie, Archbishop of Canterbury, at St Paul's Cathedral. He was translated in 1993 to be Bishop of Manchester and retired in 2002. He currently ministers as an honorary assistant bishop in the Diocese of Worcester.

Church of England titles
Preceded by Barry Rogerson	Bishop of Wolverhampton; 1985–1993	Succeeded by Michael Bourke
Preceded by Stanley Booth-Clibborn	Bishop of Manchester; 1993–2002	Succeeded by Nigel McCulloch
