= Clive Gregory =

British Anglican bishop (born 1961)

The Right Reverend Clive Gregory
- area Bishop of Wolverhampton
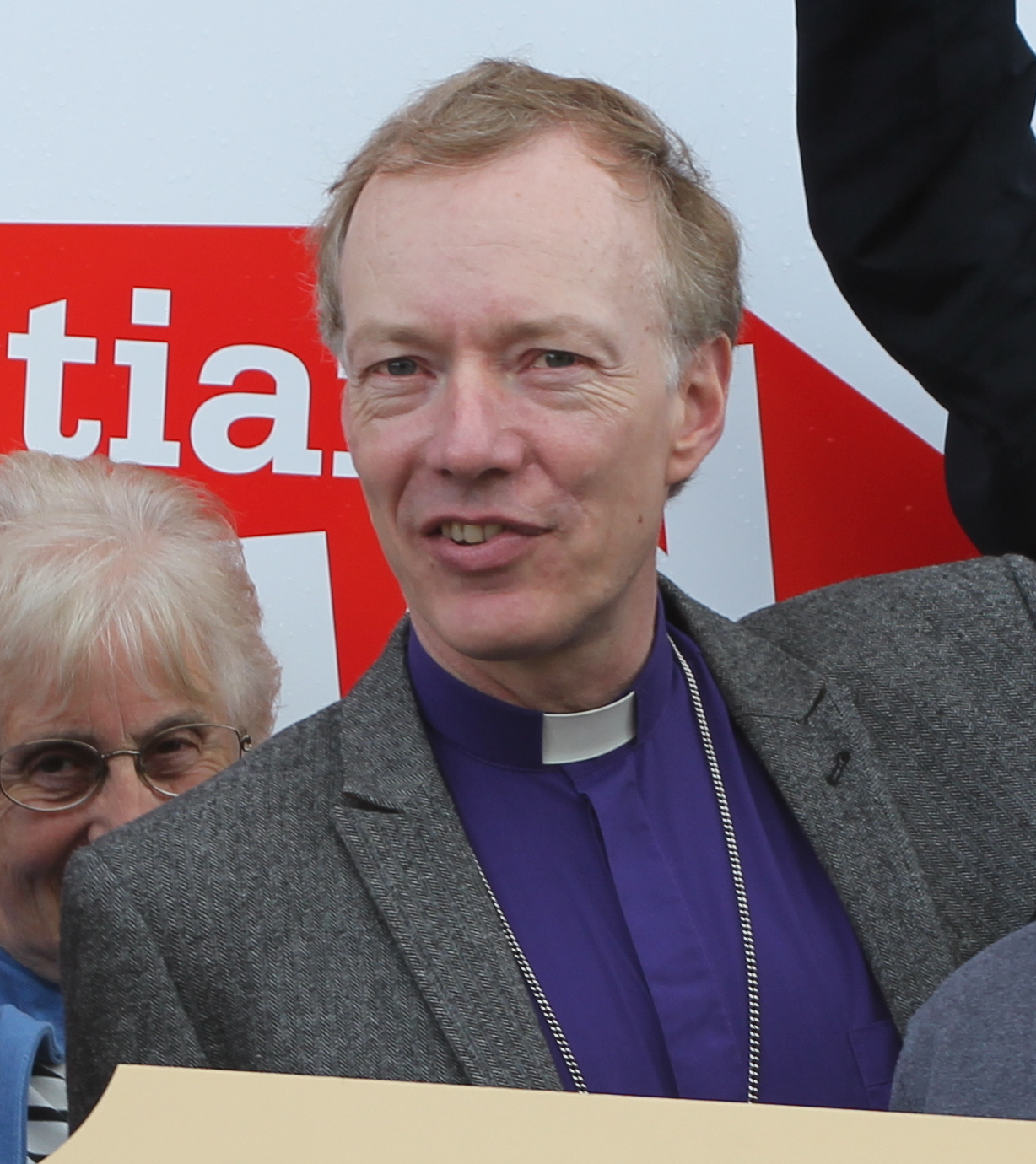
- Gregory in 2012
- Church: Church of England
- Diocese: Diocese of Lichfield
- In office: 2007–2023
- Predecessor: Michael Bourke
- Other post: Acting Bishop of Lichfield (2015–2016)

Orders
- Ordination: 1988 (deacon); 1989 (priest) by Robert Runcie
- Consecration: 19 April 2007 by Rowan Williams

Personal details
- Born: 25 November 1961 (age 64)
- Denomination: Anglican
- Spouse: (m. 1997)
- Children: two
- Education: Lancaster University

Clive Malcolm Gregory (born 25 November 1961) is a British retired Anglican bishop. He served as the Bishop of Wolverhampton, an area bishop in the Diocese of Lichfield from 2007 until he retired in 2023.

== Early life and education ==
Gregory was born on 25 November 1961. He was educated at Lancaster University, graduating in 1984 with a Bachelor of Arts (BA) degree in English. In 1985, he started training for the ministry at Westcott House, Cambridge, gaining his theology degree (a BA from Queens' College, Cambridge) in 1987. Per Oxbridge tradition, this BA was upgraded to a Cambridge Master of Arts (MA Cantab) degree in 1989.

== Ordained ministry ==
Made a deacon at Petertide (26 June) 1988 and ordained a priest the Petertide following (2 July 1989) — both times by Robert Runcie, Archbishop of Canterbury, at Canterbury Cathedral, he began his career with a curacy at St John the Baptist, Margate; was then senior Chaplain at the University of Warwick (1992–1998) and finally (before his appointment to the episcopate) Team Rector of the Coventry East team of churches.

=== Episcopal ministry ===
Gregory was appointed as Bishop of Wolverhampton, a suffragan and area bishop in the Diocese of Lichfield, in 2007. He was ordained and consecrated a bishop on 19 April 2007, by Rowan Williams, Archbishop of Canterbury, at Southwark Cathedral and installed as Lichfield Cathedral on 5 May 2007. In the vacancy between the retirement of Jonathan Gledhill on 30 September 2015 and the arrival of Michael Ipgrave on 10 June 2016, Gregory was also the acting Bishop of Lichfield. He retired effective 30 April 2023.

== Personal life ==
Gregory married in 1997 and they have two children. He is a keen cricketer.

== Styles ==
- The Reverend Clive Gregory (1988–2007)
- The Right Reverend Clive Gregory (2007–present)

Church of England titles
Preceded by Michael Bourke	Bishop of Wolverhampton; 2007–2023	TBA
