= John Pope (priest) =

English priest in the mid-16th century

John Pope was an English priest in the mid 16th-century.

A Fellow of All Souls College, Oxford, he held incumbencies at Sutterton, Kettlethorpe and Leighton Buzzard. Pope became Chancellor of Lincoln Cathedral in 1543 and Archdeacon of Bedford in 1554. He died in Lincoln on 11 November 1558, and is buried at the cathedral.
