= John Hare (bishop) =

Bishop of Bedford

John Tyrrell Holmes Hare (24 November 1912 – 25 October 1976) was Bishop of Bedford from 1968 to 1976.

He was educated at Brighton College and Corpus Christi College, Oxford. After a period of study at Ripon College Cuddesdon he was ordained in 1937 and began his career with a curacy at St Francis of Assisi, West Bromwich followed by a period as Vicar of St Matthias, Colindale. In 1951 he began a long association with the Bedford area, being successively Rural Dean, Archdeacon of Bedford and then Suffragan Bishop. He died in post on 25 October 1976.

== Notes ==
Church of England titles
Preceded by John Trillo	Bishop of Bedford; 1968–1976	Succeeded by Alec Graham
