= John Pope (planter) =

American politician

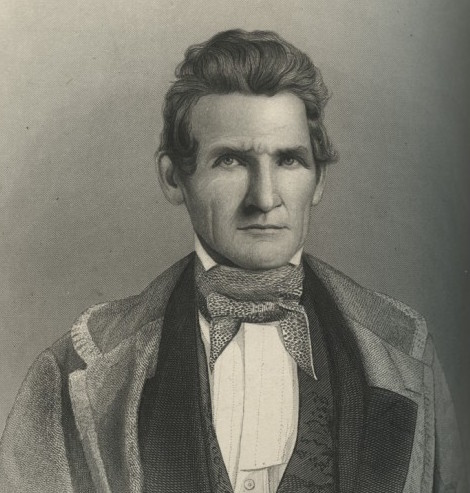
John Pope

John Pope (July 16, 1794 – March 27, 1865) was an American politician and planter.

Pope, the son of Leroy Pope, was born at Petersburgh, Georgia, July 16, 1794.

He began his collegiate education at Cumberland College, (Nashville, Tennessee), but, a year after, entered the Sophomore Class at Yale College, where he graduated in 1815. On leaving College, he commenced the study of law; but soon after, having married Miss Louisa Rembert, the daughter of a wealthy planter in Georgia, he turned his attention to cotton planting, and settled near Huntsville, Alabama. He served several terms in the Alabama State Legislature, where he distinguished himself as the champion of a liberal system of internal improvements.

His fondness for agricultural pursuits led him to abandon political life. Attracted by the undeveloped resources of the country, he removed to West Tennessee, then an almost unbroken wilderness, and settled near Memphis, Tennessee, which was at that time little more than an Indian trading post. It is an evidence of the success with which he devoted himself to his favorite pursuit, that he obtained the premium for the best bale of short staple cotton exhibited at the World's Fair, The Great Exhibition, in London, in 1851. He took a prominent part in the organization of an Agricultural Society, of which he was for many years the President, and his contributions to the agricultural literature of the day were extensive and valuable. His services in this department, and in the development of the great Mississippi River valley, were recognized at the "Internal Improvement Convention," which met at Memphis, in 1835, and of which John C. Calhoun was President, when Mr. Pope was made Chairman of the Committee on Agriculture.

For some years before his death he was President of the Union Bank of Tennessee and was prominently engaged in the Memphis and Charleston Railroad enterprise.

In 1837, he lost his first wife, and a few years later married Miss Elizabeth Hemphill Jones, of Wilmington, Delaware, whom he also survived.

He had a son, Leroy C. Pope, who died at age 14 in 1840.

He died at his residence near Memphis, Tenn., March 27, 1865, aged 70 years.
