= Ironside (surname) =

Ironside is a surname.

== People ==
Notable people with the surname include:

- Adelaide Ironside (1831–1867), Australian artist
- Björn Ironside, Swedish king
- Bjørn Haraldsen Ironside (Bjørn Jærnside, died 1134), Danish prince
- Christopher Ironside, British artist and designer
- David Ironside, South African cricketer
- Edmund Ironside, King of England during 1016
- Edmund Ironside, 1st Baron Ironside, British general
- Edmund Ironside, 2nd Baron Ironside, British politician and engineer, son of the above
- Edward Ironside (Lord Mayor of London) (1705–1753), Lord Mayor of London
- Gilbert Ironside the elder (1588–1671), Bishop of Bristol
- Gilbert Ironside the younger (1632–1701)
- Harry A. Ironside, Bible teacher, preacher, and pastor
- Hugo Ironside (1918–2008), British Army Officer
- Ian Ironside (Born 1964), English Footballer
- Isaac Ironside (1808–1870), British Chartist
- Janey Ironside (1919–1979), Professor of fashion
- Joe Ironside (Born 1993), English Footballer
- Michael Ironside, Canadian character actor
- Ralph Ironside, Archdeacon of Dorset
- Robert Ironside (footballer), New Zealand international footballer
- Robert Ironside (businessman), Canadian businessman
- Roy Ironside (Born 1935), English Footballer
- Samuel Ironside (1814–1897), New Zealand missionary
- Virginia Ironside, British journalist

== Lists of people ==
- Edmund Ironside (disambiguation)
- Edward Ironside (disambiguation)
- Gilbert Ironside (disambiguation)
- Robert Ironside (disambiguation)

== See also ==
- Christopher Evans-Ironside, English/German composer and musician
- Henry Bax-Ironside (1859–1929), British diplomat
- Ironside (disambiguation)
