= Gilbert Ironside =

Gilbert Ironside may refer to:

- Gilbert Ironside the elder (1588–1671), Bishop of Bristol (1660–1671)
- Gilbert Ironside the younger (1632–1701), Bishop of Bristol (1689–1691), Bishop of Hereford (1691–1701), Vice-Chancellor of Oxford (1687–1689), Warden of Wadham College (1665–1689)
- Gilbert Ironside (1736–1802), Colonel of the East India Company, Military Secretary to the Bengal Presidency of Governor General Warren Hastings, resident of Ballygunge

== See also ==
- Gilbert (given name)
- Ironside (surname)
- Gilbert (disambiguation)
- Ironside (disambiguation)
