= Thomas Westfield =

English churchman (1573–1644)

Thomas Westfield (1573 – 25 June 1644) was an English churchman, Bishop of Bristol and member of the Westminster Assembly.

== Life ==
He was born in the parish of St. Mary's, Ely, in 1573, and went to the free school there under Master Spight. He proceeded to Jesus College, Cambridge, where he was elected a scholar, and afterwards held a fellowship from 1599 to 1603. He graduated B.A. in 1593, M.A. in 1596, and B.D. in 1604. He was incorporated B.D. at Oxford on 9 July 1611, proceeded D.D. at Cambridge in 1615, and was reincorporated D.D. at Oxford on 26 March 1644. On 5 August 1619 he was admitted a student at Gray's Inn.

After serving as curate at St. Mary-le-Bow under Nicholas Felton, he was presented to the rectory of South Somercotes in Lincolnshire in 1600, which he exchanged on 18 December 1605 for the London living of St. Bartholomew, Smithfield, where David Dee had been deprived; Westfield was chaplain to Robert Rich, 1st Earl of Warwick, the patron, and his son Henry. On 28 April 1615 he was appointed to the rectory of Hornsey, which he retained until 1637. On 14 November 1631 he was collated archdeacon of St. Albans, and on 17 December 1633 was included in a royal commission to exercise ecclesiastical jurisdiction in England and Wales. In 1631 he became president of Sion College.

On the outbreak of the First English Civil War he continued to reside in London, but, falling under suspicion of royalist sympathies, he was abused in the streets and sequestered from St. Bartholomew. He left for the King's forces, and on 26 April 1642 was consecrated bishop of Bristol, in succession to Robert Skinner. Westfield held his other offices in commendam with his bishopric, probably without deriving any revenue from them. The emoluments of his bishopric also were at first retained from him by the Parliament, but on 13 May 1643 they were restored to him by order of the parliamentary Committee of sequestrations out of respect for his character, and he was given a pass to Bristol. This good treatment may have been due to his consent to attend the Westminster Assembly, which met on 1 July. Although his share in the proceedings was small, he was present at least at the first meeting. He died on 25 June 1644, and was buried in the choir in Bristol Cathedral, where a monument was erected to him by his wife Elizabeth (d. 1653), daughter of Adolphus van Meetkerke the president of Flanders, and sister of Edward Meetkerke. By her he had a daughter Elizabeth.

An emotive preacher, he was known as "Mournful Jeremy" and the "weeping prophet".

== Works ==
He was the author of two collections of sermons:

- Englands Face in Isrels Glasse, or the Sinnes, Mercies, Judgments of both Nations, eight sermons, London, 1646; London, 1655; reprinted, with three other sermons, under the title 'Eleven choice Sermons as they were delivered . . . by Thomas Westfield . . . Bishop of Bristol,' London, 1656.
- The White Robe, or the Surplice vindicated, four sermons, 1660; new edit. 1669.

== Notes ==
Church of England titles
Preceded by Robert Skinner	Bishop of Bristol; 1642 to 1644	Succeeded by Thomas Howell
