= William Benn =

William Benn may refer to:

- William Wedgwood Benn, 1st Viscount Stansgate (1877–1960), British Liberal politician who later joined the Labour Party
- William Benn (divine) (1600–1680), English divine
- William Benn (Lord Mayor of London) (c. 1682–1755), British merchant
- Captain William Gordon Benn (1889-1962), Royal Navy
