= Ironside =

Ironside or Ironsides may refer to:

== Arts and entertainment ==
- Ironside (1967 TV series), an American television series (1967–1975) starring Raymond Burr
- Ironside (2013 TV series), a remake of the previous series, starring Blair Underwood
- Ironside (Black novel), a 2007 urban fantasy novel by Holly Black
- Ironside (Thompson novel), a 1967 American crime novel by Jim Thompson
- Sir Ironside, the Red Knight of the Red Launds in Thomas Malory's Le Morte d'Arthur

== Places in the United States ==
- Ironsides, Maryland
- Ironsides Island, New York
- Ironside, Oregon, an unincorporated community
- Ironsides, Pennsylvania, a populated area in Schuylkill, Pennsylvania

== In the military ==
- Ironside (cavalry), a cavalry trooper in the army formed by Oliver Cromwell
- Operation Ironside, a military deception in World War II
- An alternative name for the Humber Light Reconnaissance Car, a 1940 British armoured fighting vehicle

== People ==
- Ironside (surname)

== Other uses ==
- Baron Ironside, a title in the Peerage of the United Kingdom
- Ironsides, a West Cornwall Railway steam locomotive
- Járnsíða, an Icelandic law-book
- Operation Ironside, one name for the ANOM sting operation
- As an alias used by the Daleks in Doctor Who in the 2010 episode "Victory of the Daleks

== See also ==
- Edmund Ironside (play), a piece of Shakespeare Apocrypha
- Old Ironsides (disambiguation)
- USS New Ironsides
- Iron armour
- Ironclad
- Armor
- Ironhide (disambiguation)
- Iron (disambiguation)
- Side (disambiguation)
