= Old Ironsides =

Old Ironsides may refer to:

== Nicknames ==
- Oliver Cromwell (1599–1658), English general, Lord Protector and politician whose nickname was "Old Ironsides"
- HMS Britannia, a 100-gun Royal Navy first rate ship-of-the-line active during the American Revolutionary War and the Napoleonic Wars
- USS Constitution, a 44-gun United States Navy frigate, still in commission
- 1st Armored Division, an armored division of the United States Army
- Norman Keith Collins (aka Sailor Jerry), "Old Ironsides" was his nickname on his radio show

== Other uses ==
- "Old Ironsides", an article by James Fenimore Cooper published posthumously in 1853
- Old Ironsides (album), by hip-hop duo Mars ILL
- Old Ironsides (bar), a bar in Sacramento, California
- Old Ironsides (film), a 1926 film directed by James Cruze and starring Wallace Beery
- Old Ironsides (locomotive), the first locomotive built by Matthias W. Baldwin
- "Old Ironsides" (poem), an 1830 poem written by Oliver Wendell Holmes, Sr. as a tribute to the USS Constitution
- Old Ironsides (trophy), a college football rivalry
- Old Ironsides (VTA), a light rail station in Santa Clara California

== See also ==
- USS New Ironsides
- Ironside (disambiguation)
