= Edward Ironside =

Edward Ironside may refer to:

- Edward Ironside (Lord Mayor of London) (1705–1753), British banker and Lord Mayor of London
- Edward Ironside (topographer) (c. 1736–1803), British topographer

== See also ==
- Edmund Ironside (disambiguation)
