= Edmund Ironside (disambiguation) =

Edmund Ironside was King of the English from 23 April to 30 November 1016.

Edmund Ironside may also refer to:

- Edmund Ironside, 1st Baron Ironside, Field Marshal Sir William Edmund Ironside, Chief of the British Imperial General Staff 1939–1940
- Edmund Ironside, 2nd Baron Ironside, his son, British politician and engineer
- Edmund Ironside (play), an anonymous play some attribute to William Shakespeare

== See also ==
- Edward Ironside (disambiguation)
