= Robert Ironside =

Robert Ironside may refer to:

- Robert Ironside (footballer) (born 1967), New Zealand soccer player
- Robert Ironside (businessman) (1854–1910), Canadian businessman
- Robert T. Ironside, a fictional character played by Raymond Burr in the 1967 TV series Ironside (1967–1975)
- Robert Ironside, a fictional character played by Blair Underwood in the 2013 TV series Ironside
