= Morley Old Hall =

Historical English house

Coordinates: 52.5445°N 1.0304°E

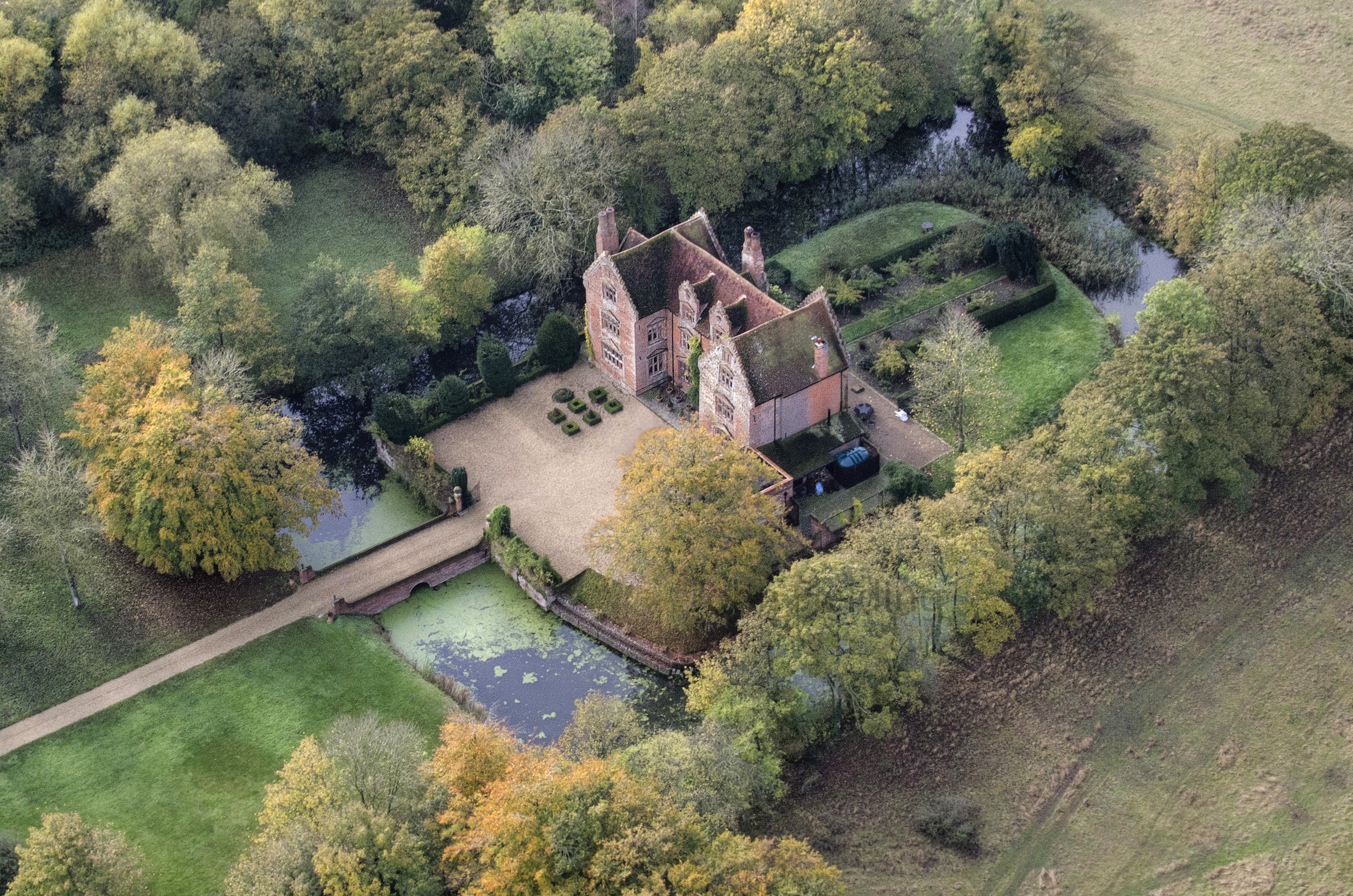
Morley Old Hall

Morley Old Hall is a Grade I-listed moated manor house built in the sixteenth century in the village of Morley Saint Peter, some twelve miles from the cathedral city of Norwich, Norfolk, England.

The house was created circa 1600 by John Sedley, an architect to Henry VII. It is built to a U-shaped floor plan in two storeys with two storeys of attics. Constructed in brick with plain-tiled roofs it is completely surrounded by a moat.

In recent years the house has been owned by Field Marshal Sir Edmund Ironside, Commander in Chief of Home Forces during the Second World War and, in the 1970s, by Janet Shand Kydd, the first wife of Peter Shand Kydd, stepfather of Diana, Princess of Wales.
