= Humber FWD =

British military off-road vehicle

Humber F.W.D.
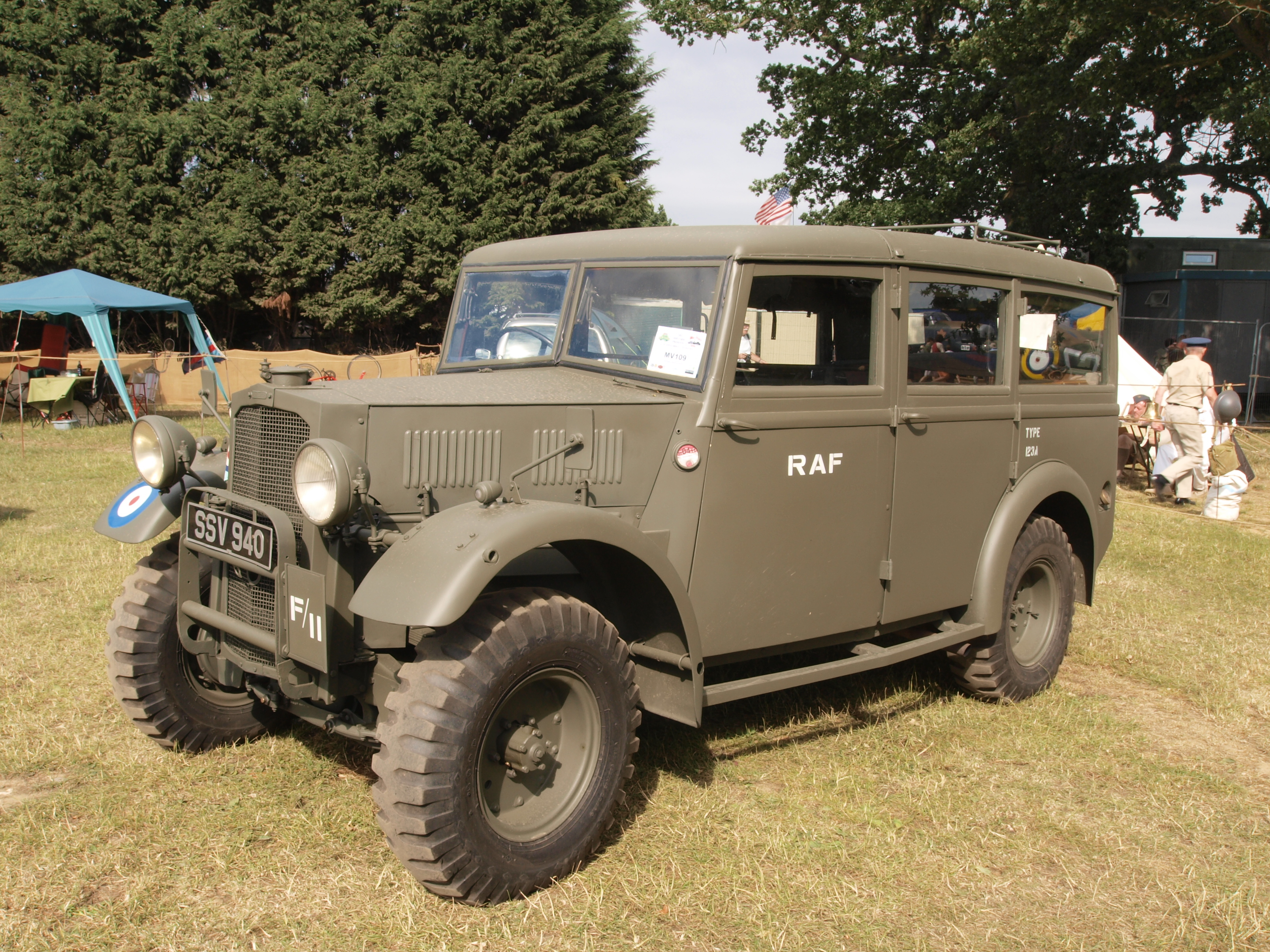

Overview
- Manufacturer: Humber Limited
- Also called: Humber 4×4 heavy utility
- Production: 1941–1945

Body and chassis
- Class: SUV
- Body style: 5-door closed truck van
- Related: Humber Snipe

Powertrain
- Engine: petrol straight-six engine 4.08 l, 85 KM
- Transmission: 4-speed manual transmission, 2-speed reducer
- Hybrid drivetrain: Front engine, rear-wheel drive/attachable 4×4

Dimensions
- Wheelbase: 2,838 mm (111.7 in)
- Length: 4,293 mm (169.0 in)
- Width: 1,880 mm (74.0 in)
- Height: 1,956 mm (77.0 in)

Chronology
- Successor: Land Rover series (in the military)

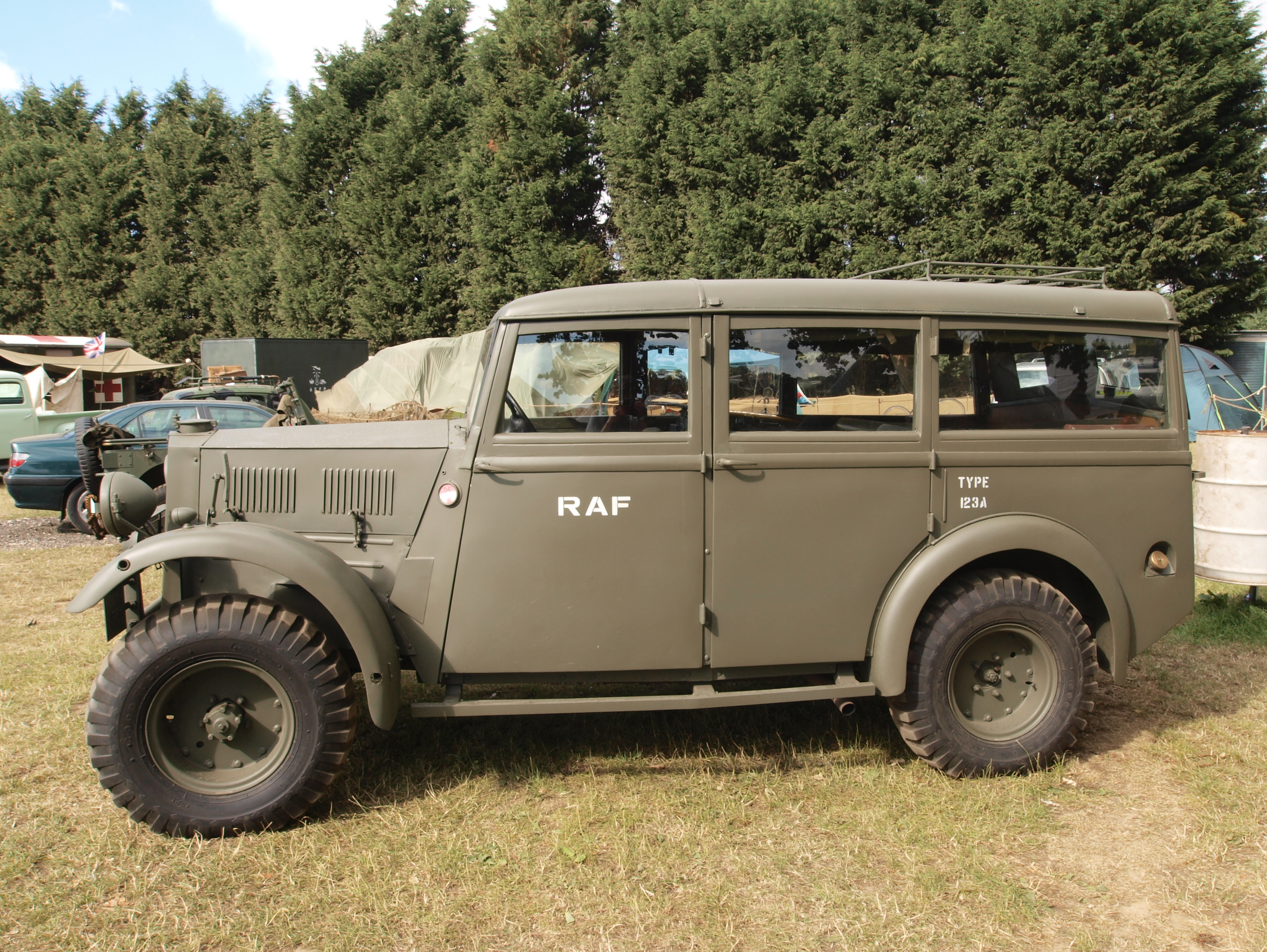
Humber FWD heavy utility

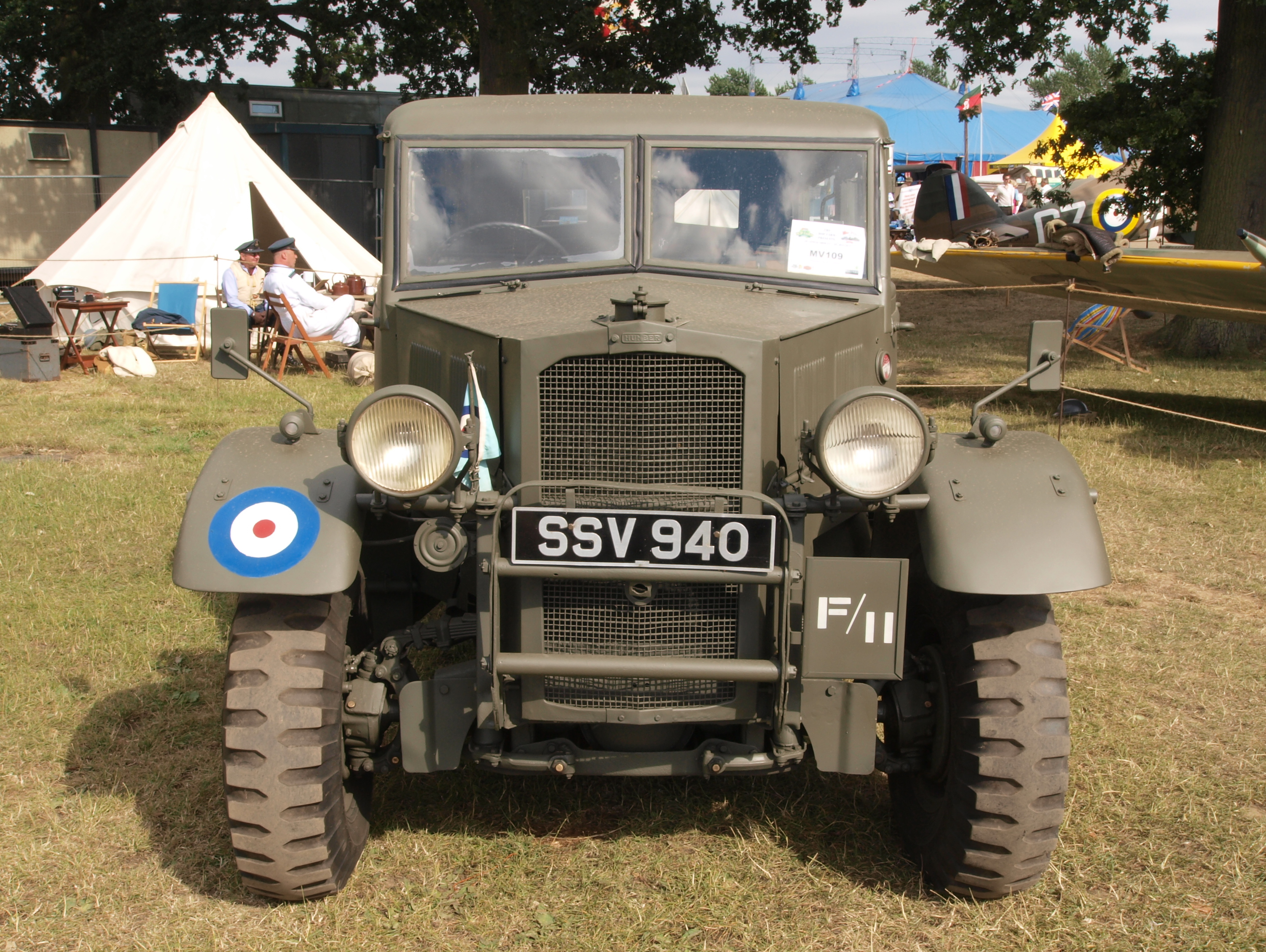
Humber FWD heavy utility

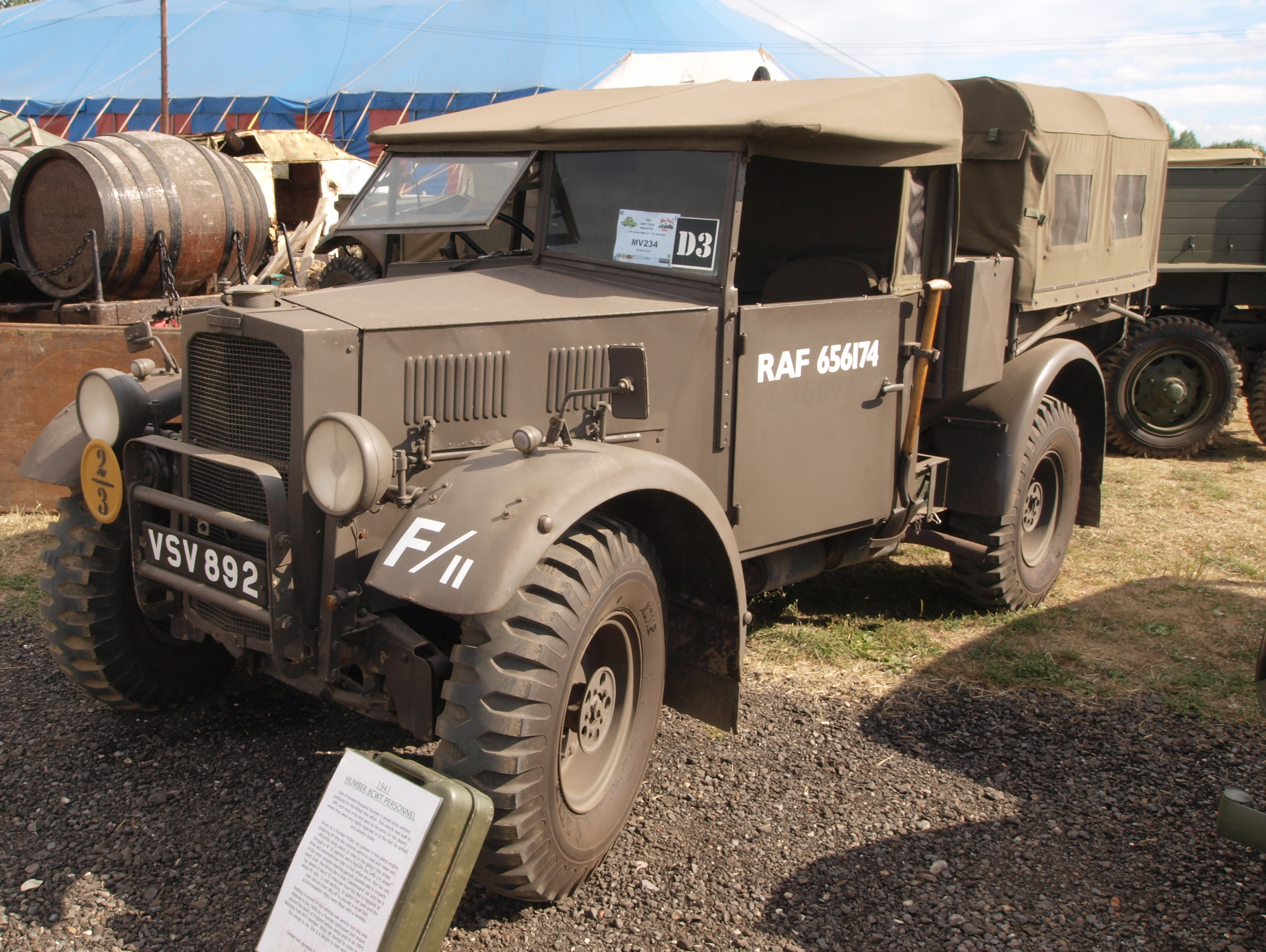
Humber FWD 8-cwt truck

The Humber FWD is a British military off-road vehicle produced by the Humber company from 1941 to 1945. The primary version was the Humber 4×4 heavy utility, commonly known as the Box. It was also produced in variants such as a light off-road truck with a payload capacity of 8 cwt (400 kg) and an ambulance.

== History (heavy utility version) ==
The Humber FWD (four wheel drive, sometimes written as F.W.D.) was designed for the British Army after the outbreak of World War II. Its design was partly derived from the Humber Super Snipe passenger car, incorporating elements such as the engine, independent front suspension, and gearbox. The primary version was a heavy utility passenger off-road vehicle, officially designated as Car, Heavy Utility, 4x4 (FWD), Humber. It was the only four-wheel-drive passenger car produced in the United Kingdom during the war. Production began in May 1941 and continued until the end of the war, with approximately 6,500 units manufactured.

The Humber 4×4 heavy utility vehicles were mainly used as staff cars, sometimes equipped with radio stations. They saw service in the North African campaign and Western Europe. Users included the Royal Air Force Mountain Rescue Service, among others. These vehicles were considered durable and reliable, remaining in use until the late 1950s. They were not produced for the civilian market.

The Humber FWD vehicles were also used by the Polish Armed Forces in the West, including as staff cars in the II Corps.

== Derived varieties ==
On the same chassis as the base off-road vehicle, light utility trucks with a 400 kg payload capacity (Humber F.W.D. 8-cwt Personnel/G.S. Truck) were developed. These trucks utilized the same front body section but featured a cargo bed at the rear. However, they were produced in limited numbers.

Additionally, light off-road ambulances (Humber Light Ambulance) were manufactured, with bodies built by Thrupp & Maberly, a company known for crafting luxury coachwork for Humber vehicles before the war. These ambulances could carry two pairs of stretchers, and over 1,100 units were produced. A small number of these ambulances were converted into BBC war correspondents' vans equipped with Type C recording equipment, with plans for a total of 24 such vehicles.

Thrupp & Maberly also built cross-country saloons on the F.W.D. chassis, featuring bodywork styled like passenger cars. The F.W.D. chassis was further used to produce light reconnaissance armored cars, the Humber Light Reconnaissance Cars. In addition to the 4×4 off-road vehicles, Humber also produced different 4×2 heavy utility vehicles based on the Humber Snipe.

== Description ==
The heavy utility version of the Humber FWD featured a closed, five-door metal body in a station wagon style, with a split rear tailgate. The upper part of the tailgate, containing two small windows, opened upwards, while the lower part opened downwards. The vehicle had two rows of seats: the second row had two seats positioned between the wheel arches, and two additional folding seats were located along the sides in the rear section, facing inward. The vehicle could accommodate up to seven passengers (or six, according to some sources). The rear row of seats could be removed to increase cargo space. A fold-out map table was attached to the back of the front seats.

In later production models, a tent could be deployed in the rear section, extending the sleeping area when the tailgate was open. Modified versions for general staff officers included a sliding roof, a map reading lamp, and a more comfortable interior (some sources indicate that later models also featured a sliding roof). Vehicles used in North Africa sometimes had their fixed roofs replaced with a roll-up canvas. The spare wheel was carried on the lower rear tailgate.

The Humber FWD had permanent rear-wheel drive, with front-wheel drive being engageable via a two-speed transfer case for lower gear ratios. According to tests by The Autocar magazine, the vehicle had a cruising speed of 50 mph (80 km/h) on the road, and a maximum speed of approximately 40 mph (64 km/h) with four-wheel drive engaged.

== Technical data (heavy utility version) ==
- Dimensions:
  - Length: 4,293 mm
  - Width: 1,880 mm
  - Height: 1,956 mm
  - Wheelbase: 2,838 mm
  - Track: front – 1,549 mm; rear – 1,543 mm
  - Ground clearance: 241 mm
- Weight: 2413.1 kg (2 tons 7½ cwt)
- Gross weight: 2946.5 kg (2 tons 18 cwt)
- Engine:
  - Humber – gasoline, carburetor, inline-six engine, side-valve, water-cooled, front-mounted
  - Displacement: 4,086 cm^{3}
  - Bore × stroke: 85 mm × 120 mm
  - Maximum power: 85 hp at 3,400 rpm
  - Maximum torque: 244 N⋅m (2,160 lbs/in)
- Transmission: mechanical, 4-speed with reverse gear
  - Gear ratios: I – 3.7:1; II – 2.48:1; III – 1.46:1; IV – 1:1; reverse – 3.7:1
- Transfer case: 2-speed (high – 1:1; low – 1.477:1)
- Clutch: single dry plate
- Drive: 4x4 (permanent rear-wheel drive, engageable front-wheel drive)
- Axle ratios: spiral, 4.88:1
- Suspension:
  - Front: independent, transverse semi-elliptical springs, hydraulic shock absorbers
  - Rear: semi-elliptical springs, hydraulic shock absorbers
- Service brake: hydraulic, on all wheels
- Parking brake: mechanical, on rear wheels
- Tires: 9,25 x 16 inches
- Maximum speed: over 80 km/h
- Average fuel consumption: 12 miles per gallon (23.54 liters/100 km)
- Turning circle: 13.8 meters

== Bibliography ==
- Conniford, M.P. (1971). Military Vehicle Data. No.6. London: Bellona Publications.
- Georgano, G.N. (1998). World War Two Military Vehicles Transport & Halftracks. London: Osprey Automotive. ISBN 1855324067.
