= Ironhide =

Ironhide may refer to:

- Ironhide, a fictional character from the Transformers science fiction robot media franchise; see List of The Transformers (TV series) characters
- The Transformers: Ironhide, a comic book published by IDW from the Transformers science fiction robot media franchise
- Ironhide Game Studio, a videogame studio software company
- Grimgor Ironhide, a fictional character from the Warhammer fantasy media franchise

== See also ==
- Armor
- Ironclad
- Iron armour
- Ironside (disambiguation)
- Iron (disambiguation)
- Hide (disambiguation)
