= Adolf van Meetkercke =

Flemish diplomat and philologist (1528–1591)

Adolf van Meetkercke (Note: There are numerous variants, in particular found in the English State Papers; Meetkerke, Meetkerk, Meetkirk, Meddykyrk, Medekerk, Medkerke, Midkerke, Meetkerque, Meetquerque, Metkerke, Mettkerke, Mekerke, Merkerke etc.; Mekerchus, Medkerkius, Metkerkius. Also Adolph or Adolphus.) (1528–1591) (Latin: Adolphus Mekerchus) was a Flemish diplomat and humanist.

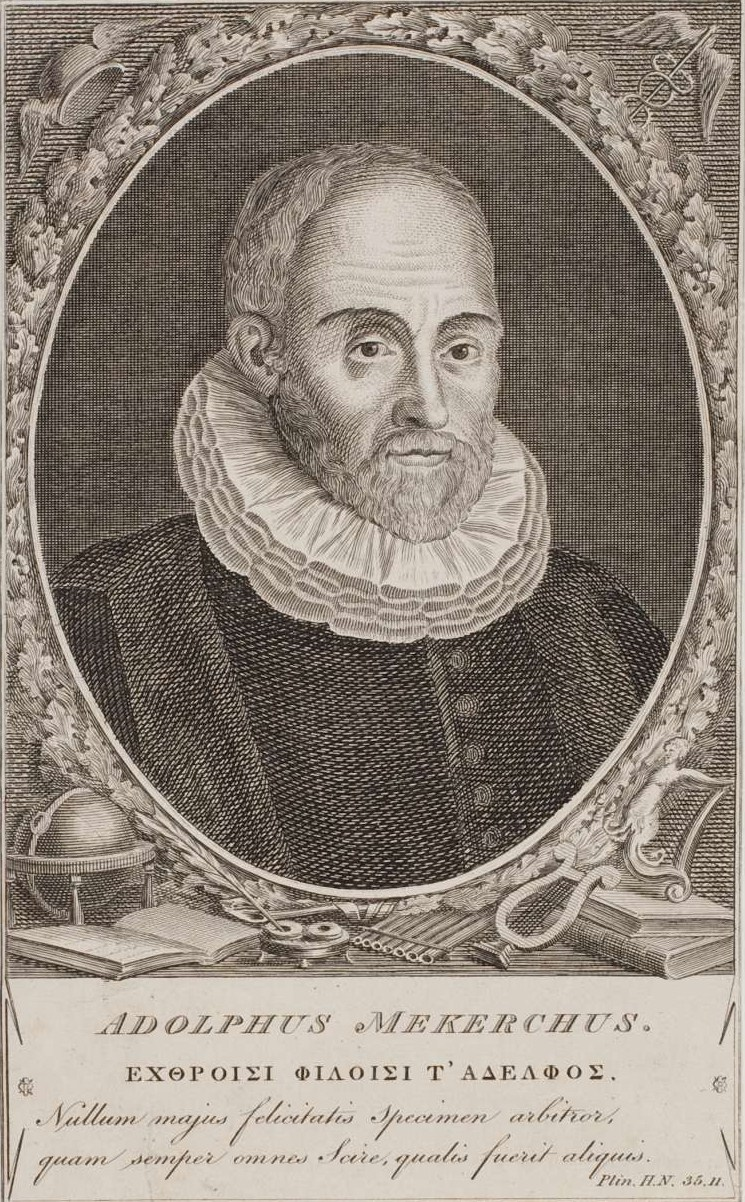
Adolf van Meetkercke, engraving by James Basire.

== Life ==
He was born in Bruges, into a wealthy family of the nobility.

In 1577, after the Pacification of Ghent, he travelled to England on a diplomatic mission concerned with the First Union of Brussels, with the Marquis of Havrech (Havré), Charles Philippe de Croÿ (1549–1613).

In 1580, he became a Protestant convert. He accompanied Philip Marnix of St. Aldegonde to France, to negotiate the Treaty of Plessis-les-Tours with François of Alençon. He was then appointed as chairman of the Flemish governing council. His support for Robert Dudley, 1st Earl of Leicester in 1587 led to his becoming an exile in England, leaving with Hadrian Saravia. This followed a failed plot to mount a coup in Leiden on behalf of Leicester.

He died in London in 1591 .

== Works ==
Hubert Goltzius published his translations of Moschus and Bion of Smyrna in 1565.

- De veteri et recta pronuntiatione linguae Graecae commentarius

He wrote a commendatory poem for the Theatrum Orbis Terrarum of Abraham Ortelius.

== Family ==
He married the widow of Jean Wijts of Bruges. With Jacoba Cerbina he had four sons: Adolf, Nicolaas, Anthony, and Baldwin. Nicolaas and Baldwin were killed at the siege of Deventer, Anthony at Zutphen.

Margaret, daughter of John Lichtervelde, was his second wife; Edward Meetkerke, an English clergyman, was his son with her. His daughter Elizabeth married Thomas Westfield. There was another daughter of this marriage, Salome.
