= Thomas Howell (bishop) =

Bishop of Bristol

Thomas Howell (1588–1650) was a Welsh clergyman who was the Bishop of Bristol from 1644 to 1646.

== Early life and education ==
Howell was born in Llangamarch, Brecknockshire, Wales. He was the older brother of James Howell, and a descendant of Hywel Dda. He matriculated at Jesus College, Oxford on 20 November 1607, obtaining his BA degree on 20 February 1609, his MA on 9 July 1612, and his BD degree in July 1630.

== Career ==
After his ordination, he was appointed a royal chaplain by Charles I and was also rector of West Horsley in Surrey, becoming rector of St Stephen Walbrook on 13 April 1635. This appointment provoked a dispute between Charles I (who presented him for the position), the parishioners of the church and the Grocers' Company (who controlled the church) because Howell refused to live in the parish.

Howell was appointed to a canonry of Windsor in 1636 and the sinecure rectory of Fulham in 1642. He faced difficulties during the English Civil War: although regarded as a "puritanical preacher", he was questioned by the House of Commons on 19 March 1642 over allegations that he had criticized parliament and supported Charles I. Even before that, he had been forced out of his position at St Stephen's Walbrook in 1641 and later forfeited the rectory of West Horsley for non-residence. On the death of Thomas Westfield in 1644, Howell was appointed Bishop of Bristol by Charles I. He was consecrated by Archbishop James Ussher in August 1644, and was the last bishop to be consecrated in England for sixteen years. However, Prince Rupert surrendered Bristol to Thomas Fairfax, 3rd Lord Fairfax of Cameron on 10 September 1645 and Howell was ejected. He is not known to have attended the Westminster Assembly and is not named in the List of the Westminster Divines, probably taking the same views of its relevance as Ralph Brownrigg, Bishop of Exeter, who did not attend either. Brownrigg is named however, the brevity of Howell's Bishopric, being the cause of non-naming on the list. He was deprived of his See by Parliament on 9 October 1646, as episcopacy was abolished for the duration of the Commonwealth and the Protectorate.

== Personal life ==
His whereabouts thereafter until his death (between 20 March and 22 April 1650) are unknown, but his will left the lease of a property in Frogmore, Windsor to his ten youngest children. His wife died shortly before him in childbirth. He was buried in Bristol Cathedral after his death in 1650, his memorial stating Expergiscar ("I shall awake").

Church of England titles
Preceded by Thomas Westfield	Bishop of Bristol; 1644–1646	Succeeded by abolished until 1660; Gilbert Ironside
