= Edward Ironside (topographer) =

British topographer

Edward Ironside (c. 1736–1803) was a British topographer.

Ironside was the eldest son of Edward Ironside a banker of Lombard Street, who died in office as Lord Mayor of London on 27 November 1753.

Ironside was in the service of the East India Company. He lived at Twickenham for many years, and wrote ‘The History and Antiquities of Twickenham; being the First Part of Parochial Collections for the County of Middlesex’. It was to have been followed by a history of Isleworth, which he did not complete.

Ironside died at Twickenham on 20 June 1803, aged 67, and was buried on 28 June.

== Publications ==
- The History and Antiquities of Twickenham (1797)
