= Edmund Ironside, 1st Baron Ironside =

British Army officer (1880–1959)

Field Marshal The Right Honourable The Lord Ironside GCB CMG DSO
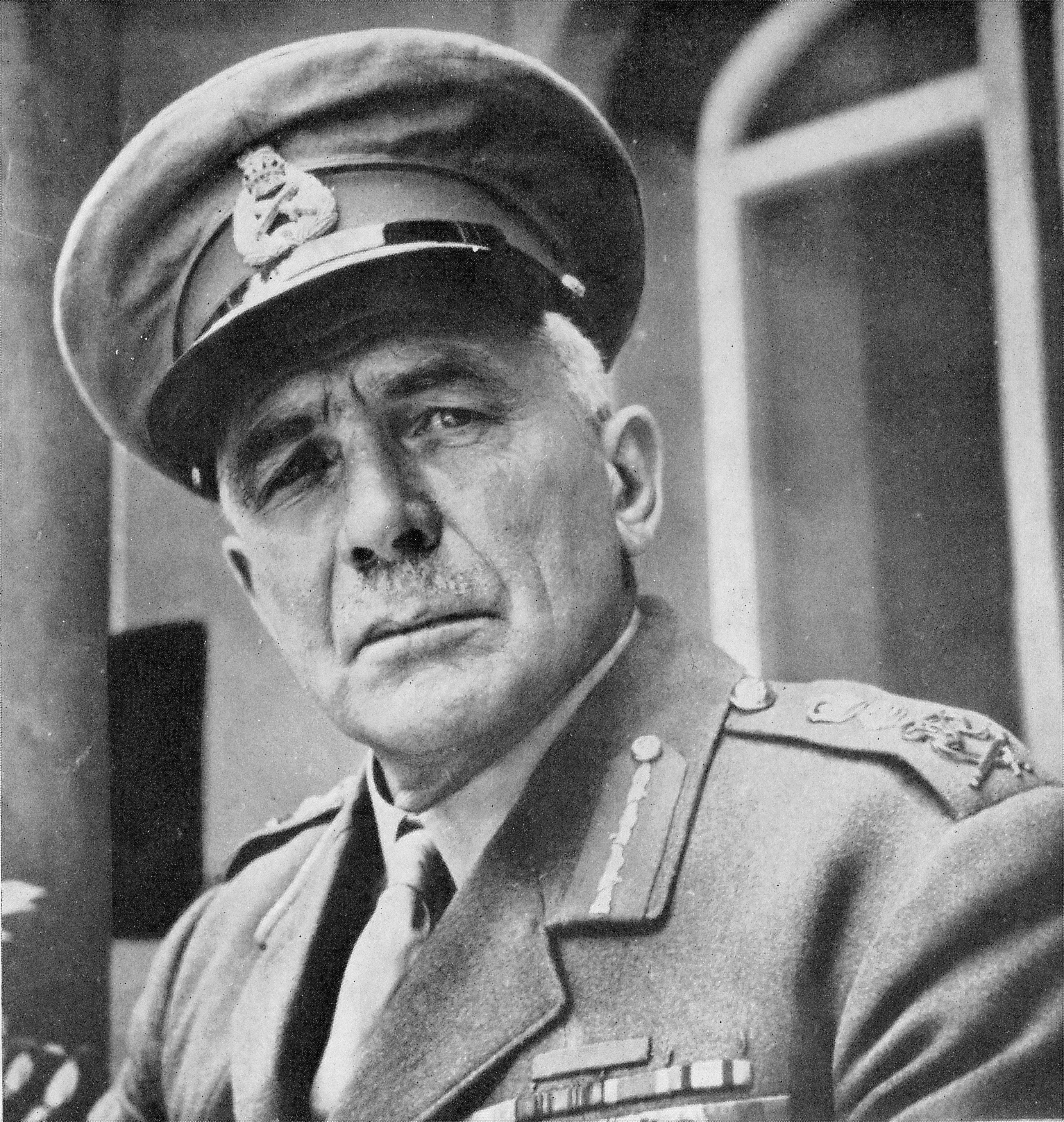
- General Sir Edmund Ironside in c. 1939
- Born: William Edmund Ironside; 6 May 1880; Edinburgh, Scotland
- Died: 22 September 1959 (aged 79); Queen Alexandra Military Hospital, London, England, United Kingdom
- Military career
- Allegiance: United Kingdom
- Branch: British Army
- Service years: 1899–1940
- Rank: Field marshal
- Nickname: "Tiny"
- Units: Royal Field Artillery; Royal Artillery
- Commands: C-in-C Home Forces (1940); Chief IGS (1939–40); Army Inspector-General (1939); Eastern Command (1936–38); 2nd Division (1926–28); Staff College (1922–26); North Persian Force (1921); Archangel expedition (1918–1919); 99th Infantry Brigade (1918)
- Conflicts: Second Boer War; First World War; North Russia Campaign; Second World War
- Awards: Knight Grand Cross of the Order of the Bath; Companion of the Order of St Michael and St George; Companion of the Distinguished Service Order; Knight of the Venerable Order of Saint John; Mentioned in Despatches (8); Legion of Honour (France); Croix de Guerre (France); Order of St. Vladimir (Russia); Order of the Lion and the Sun (Iran); Order of the Rising Sun (Japan)

Field Marshal William Edmund Ironside, 1st Baron Ironside (6 May 1880 – 22 September 1959) was a senior officer of the British Army who served as Chief of the Imperial General Staff during the first year of the Second World War.

Ironside joined the Royal Artillery in 1899, and served throughout the Second Boer War. This was followed by a brief period spying on the German colonial forces in German South West Africa. Returning to regular duty, he served on the staff of the 6th Infantry Division during the first two years of the First World War, before being appointed to a position on the staff of the newly raised 4th Canadian Division in 1916. In 1918, he was given command of a brigade on the Western Front. In 1919, he was promoted to command the Allied intervention force in northern Russia. Ironside was then assigned to an Allied force occupying Turkey, and then to the British forces based in Persia in 1921. He was offered the post of the commander of British forces in Iraq, but was unable to take up the role due to injuries in a flying accident.

He returned to the Army as Commandant of the Staff College, Camberley, where he advocated the ideas of a close friend, J. F. C. Fuller, who was a proponent of mechanisation. He later commanded a division, and military districts in both Britain and India, but his youth and his blunt approach limited his career prospects, and after being passed over for the role of Chief of the Imperial General Staff (CIGS) in 1937 he became Governor of Gibraltar, a traditional staging post to retirement. He was recalled from "exile" in mid-1939, being appointed as Inspector-General of Overseas Forces, a role which led most observers to expect he would be given the command of the British Expeditionary Force (BEF) on the outbreak of war.

However, after some political manoeuvring, General John Vereker, 6th Viscount Gort, was given this command and Ironside was appointed as the new Chief of the Imperial General Staff. Ironside himself believed that he was temperamentally unsuited to the job, but felt obliged to accept it. In early 1940 he argued heavily for Allied intervention in Scandinavia, but this plan was shelved at the last minute when the Finnish–Soviet Winter War ended. During the invasion of Norway and the Battle of France he played little part; his involvement in the latter was limited by a breakdown in relations between him and Gort. He was replaced as CIGS at the end of May, and given a role to which he was more suited: Commander-in-Chief, Home Forces, responsible for anti-invasion defences and for commanding the Army in the event of German landings. However, he served less than two months in this role before being replaced. After this, Ironside was promoted to field marshal and raised to the peerage as Baron Ironside.

Lord Ironside retired to Morley Old Hall in Norfolk to write, and never again saw active service or held any official position.

== Early life ==
Ironside was born in Edinburgh, Scotland, on 6 May 1880 to Surgeon-Major William Ironside (1836–1881) of the Royal Horse Artillery and Emma Maria (1845–1939), daughter of William Haggett Richards. His father died shortly afterwards, leaving his widowed wife to bring up their son on a limited military pension. As the cost of living in the late nineteenth century was substantially lower in mainland Europe than in Britain, she travelled extensively around the Continent, where the young Edmund began learning various foreign languages. This grasp of language would become one of the defining features of his character; by middle age, he was fluent enough to officially interpret in seven, and was proficient in perhaps ten more.

He was educated at schools in St Andrews before being sent to Tonbridge School in Kent for his secondary education; at the age of sixteen he left Tonbridge to attend a crammer, having not shown much academic promise, and was admitted to the Royal Military Academy, Woolwich, in January 1898 at the age of seventeen. At Woolwich he flourished, working hard at his studies and his sports; he took up boxing, and captained the rugby 2nd XV as well as playing for Scotland. He was built for both of these sports, six feet four inches tall and weighing seventeen stone (108 kg), for which he was nicknamed "Tiny" by his fellow students. The name stuck, and he was known by it for the rest of his life.

== Second Boer War ==
After attending the Royal Military Academy, Woolwich he was commissioned into the army as a second lieutenant with the Royal Field Artillery on 25 June 1899. Later that year his unit, 44th Battery, RFA, was despatched to South Africa. He fought throughout the Second Boer War being wounded three times, and was mentioned in despatches in 1901. He was also promoted lieutenant on 16 February 1901.

At the end of the war in May 1902, he was a member of the small force which escorted Jan Smuts to the peace negotiations. He then disguised himself as an Afrikaans-speaking Boer, taking a job as a wagon driver working for the German colonial forces in German South West Africa. This intelligence work ended unsuccessfully when he was identified, but managed to escape. This escapade later led to claims that he became the model for Richard Hannay, a character in the novels of John Buchan; Ironside was always amused by these novels when reading about Mr Standfast in the implausibly romantic setting of the passenger seat of an open-cockpit biplane flying from Iraq to Persia. He left Cape Town on the HMT Britannic in early October 1902, and arrived at Southampton later the same month. However, according to other sources, he conducted his spying activities embedded as a member of the German military staff in 1904, during the early phase of the Herero Wars, and witnessed German atrocities against the native inhabitants.

Ironside was subsequently posted to India, where he served with I Battery Royal Horse Artillery (RHA), and South Africa, with Y Battery RHA. He was promoted to captain in February 1908, appointed to the Staff in September of the same year, and then as a Brigade-Major in June 1909. He returned home in September 1912, in order to attend the Staff College, Camberley.

== First World War ==
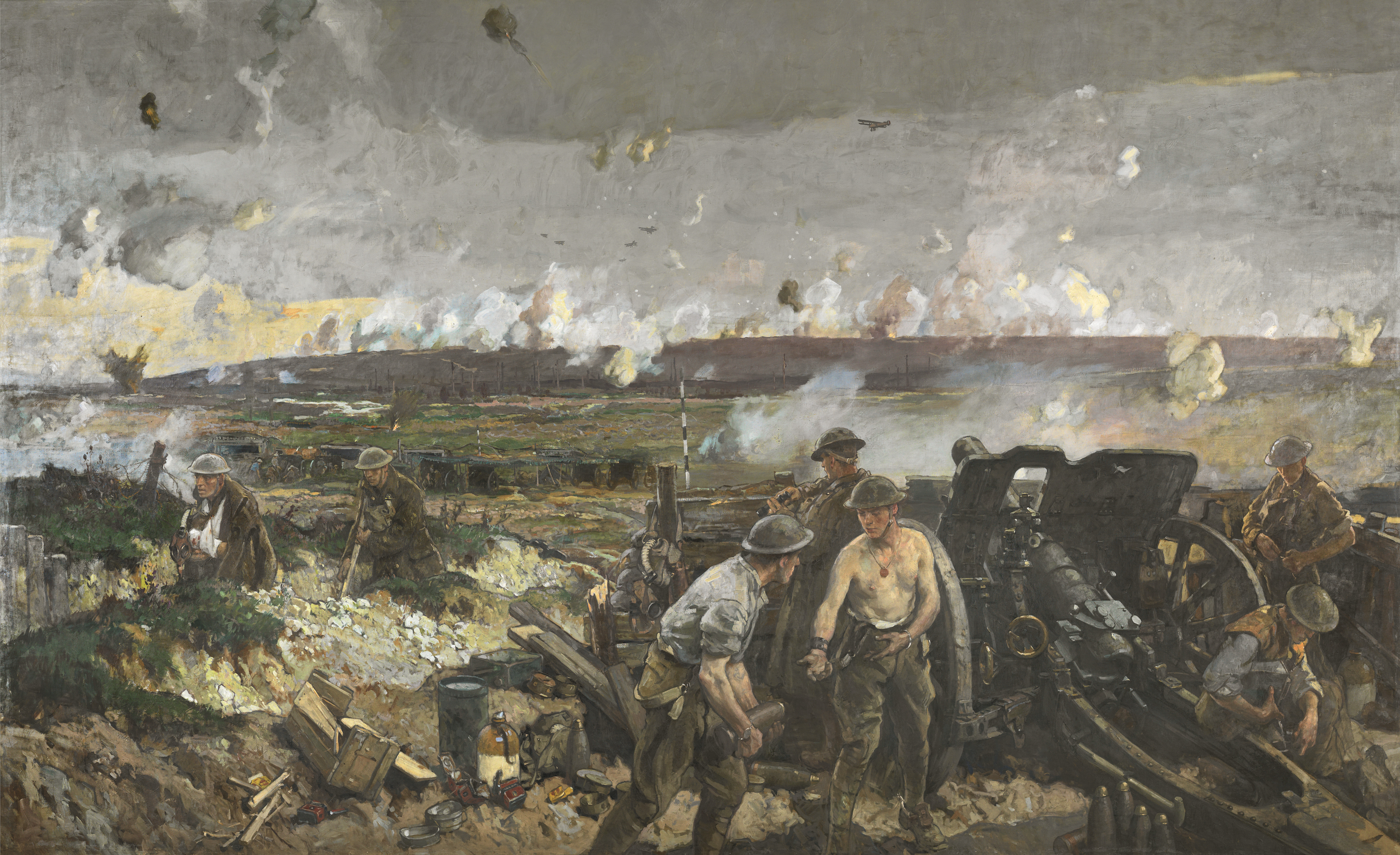
The Battle of Vimy Ridge, at which Ironside commanded 4th Canadian Division, during the First World War

Ironside's two-year course at the Staff College, which he found unstimulating, was cut short by the outbreak of the First World War in August 1914; on 5 August, he was confirmed in his appointment as a staff captain, and assigned to Boulogne-sur-Mer and then St. Nazaire, both large Army bases supporting the British Expeditionary Force (BEF). By some accounts, he was one of the first British officers to arrive in France. He was promoted to major and attached to the newly arrived 6th Division at the end of October 1914, ranked as a General Staff Officer, Grade 3 (GSO3).

In February 1915 he succeeded Lieutenant Colonel John Burnett-Stuart as a general staff officer, grade 2.

He was promoted to temporary lieutenant-colonel and appointed GSO1 in March 1916. He had expected to be made GSO1 – divisional chief of staff – to the 6th Division, but to his surprise he was assigned to the newly formed 4th Canadian Division. Ironside pushed for a hard training regime, intending to get the division to the front as quickly as possible and prevent it being broken up to feed reinforcements to the other three divisions of the Canadian Corps. Because of the inexperience of the divisional commander, Major-General David Watson – a volunteer soldier with little professional experience – he found himself almost commanding the division on occasions, noting in his memoirs that Watson regularly authorised Ironside's orders in his name. On its arrival in France in late 1916, the division participated at the end of the Battle of the Somme, before being moved north to prepare for the attack at Vimy Ridge. During the final phase of the fighting at Vimy, Ironside again was required to take unofficial command of the division, overruling an ambiguous order from Watson – who was out of contact at headquarters – to halt the attack, and personally ordering the leading battalions into action.

He remained with the division through 1917, when it fought at the Battle of Passchendale, and in January 1918 was appointed to an administrative posting, as commandant of the Small Arms School, with the rank of acting colonel. He quickly returned to the Western Front, however, when he was appointed to command the 2nd Division's 99th Brigade as a temporary brigadier-general at the end of March.

== Interwar period ==
=== Russia and Iran ===
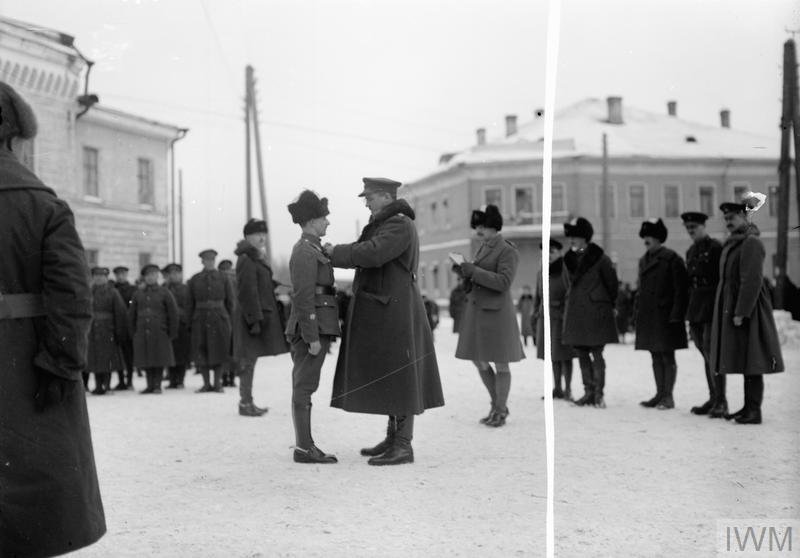
Ironside presenting medals to British troops in Arkhangelsk, 1919.

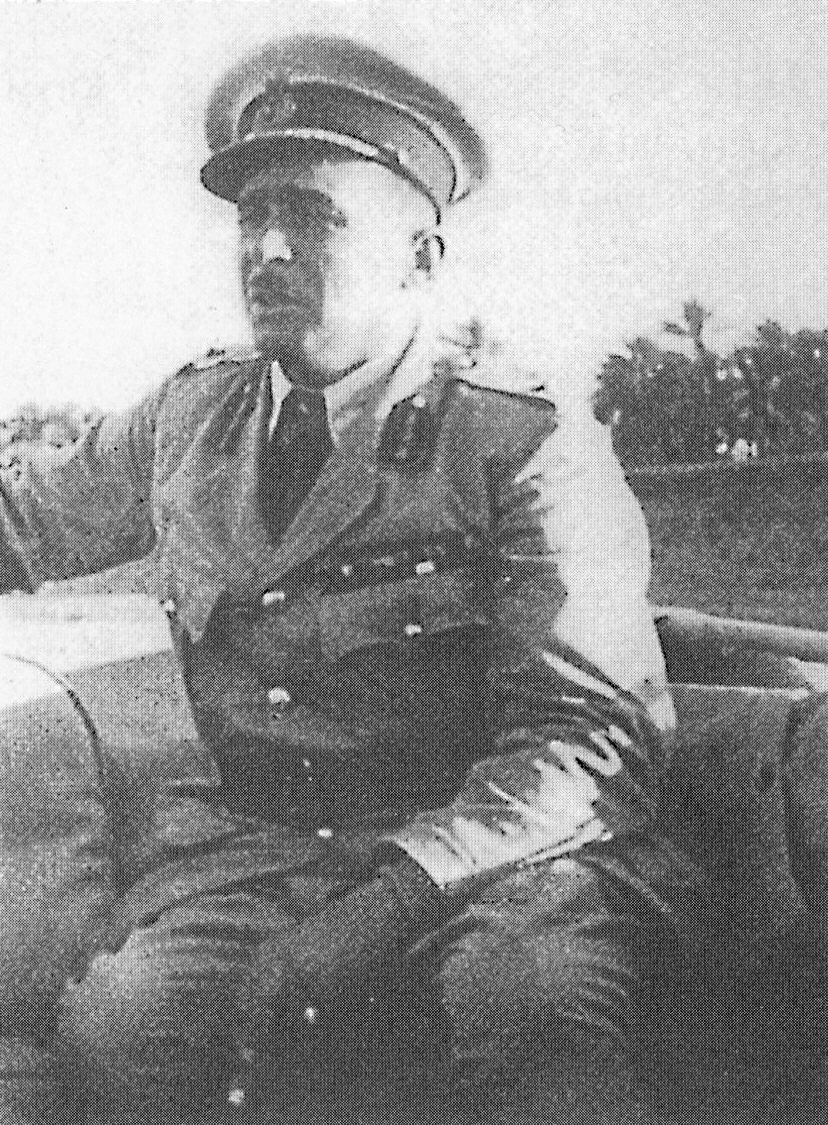
Ironside in Iran in 1920

Ironside remained with 99th Brigade for only six months; in September 1918, he was attached to the Allied Expeditionary Force fighting the Bolsheviks in northern Russia, and in November given command of the force, retaining his temporary rank of Brigadier-General. Before leaving, he appeared on the electoral platform of Oswald Mosley, who campaigned successfully as a Conservative from the Harrow constituency in the December 1918 general election. The posting to Arkhangelsk was his first independent command, and he threw himself fully into it; for over a year, he travelled continually along the Northern Dvina to keep control of his scattered international forces, at one point narrowly escaping assassination. However, the Red Army managed eventually to gain a superior position in the Civil War and in late 1919 he was forced to abandon the White Army to their fate. In November he handed command over to Henry Rawlinson, who would supervise the eventual withdrawal, and returned to Britain. Ironside, promoted on 1 January 1919 to brevet colonel, was appointed a Knight Commander of the Order of the Bath, and promoted to colonel on 2 June but relinquished his temporary major general's rank on 15 November. He was, however, promoted to substantive major general for his efforts; this made him one of the youngest major generals in the British Empire.

From March to May 1920 he commanded a military mission which supervised the withdrawal of Romanian forces left in Hungary after the Hungarian–Romanian War of 1919, and during July and August was attached to George Milne's force occupying İzmit, Ottoman Empire, as it prepared to withdraw. His third overseas posting of the year was to Persia in late August. Owing to his experience in conducting withdrawals, he was appointed the commander of the North Persia Force by the War Office on 26 September; he was also tasked with subduing the Persian Cossack Brigade's White Russian commander Vsevolod Starosselsky. The precise level of British involvement in 1921 Persian coup d'etat remains a matter of historical debate, but it is almost certain that Ironside himself at least provided advice to the plotters. In December 1920, he appointed the future shah, Colonel Reza Khan, as commander of the Persian Cossack Brigade, and subsequently groomed him for the role of Persia's strongman against the Bolshevik influence, leaving instructions for Reza to be gradually released from British control. On Ironside's departure from Persia in February 1921, Ahmad Shah Qajar awarded him the Order of the Lion and the Sun.

After Persia, he attended the Cairo Conference, where Winston Churchill persuaded him to take command of the newly reorganised British force in Iraq. His return flight to Persia in April crashed near Basra and he was invalided home after several months in hospital.

=== England and India ===
After recovering from his injuries on half-pay, Ironside returned to active duty as commandant of the Staff College, Camberley in May 1922, taking over from Major General Hastings Anderson. He spent a full four-year term there, running the college efficiently as well as publishing several articles and a book on the Battle of Tannenberg. Most importantly for his future career, he became the mentor of J. F. C. Fuller, who was appointed a lecturer at the College at the same time, and became a close acquaintance of Sir Basil Liddell-Hart. Fuller's views were deeply influential on Ironside, who became a supporter of reforming the Army as an elite armoured force with air support, and of forming a single central Ministry of Defence to control the services. He argued frequently over the need for faster modernisation and rearmament, and the problem of the 'old men' still filling the upper ranks of the army; in the end, he was reprimanded by the chief of the imperial general staff (CIGS), General Sir George Milne.

After Camberley he was appointed to command the 2nd Division in Aldershot, England, a post he held for two years with little effect or interest – he was frustrated by the task of training an infantry force with no modern equipment – and then sent to command the Meerut district, in India, in 1928. He enjoyed life in India, but found the military situation to be equally uninteresting; the equipment was old-fashioned, as were the regimental officers and the overall strategic plans. He was promoted to lieutenant-general in March 1931, and left for England in May, where he returned to half-pay with the sinecure of Lieutenant of the Tower of London. He was then posted to India as Quartermaster-General in 1933, where he travelled extensively, crossing the country to visit regiments and oversee the Indianisation process. For all this, however, it was the best of a bad job; he was still far from the War Office, and unable to make significant impact on the army's preparation for a future war.

=== Preparation for war ===
He returned home in 1936, having been promoted to full general the previous June, to lead Eastern Command, one of the corps-level regional commands in the United Kingdom, responsible for a single Regular division and three Territorial Army divisions.

In September 1937, he visited Nazi Germany to attend the large Wehrmacht manoeuvres, and met with Adolf Hitler.

Ironside realised that a European war would come sooner rather than later, and that the army was in a parlous state to defend the country. However, he found that as with his earlier posts, he could achieve little in Eastern Command – the most important decisions being made in Whitehall. He himself seemed to lose his opportunity for higher office in 1937, when he was rebuked over his mishandling of a mobile force in the annual exercises; until this point, he had been considered a possible candidate as Chief of the Imperial General Staff, but was dropped from consideration in favour of Lord Gort, whom Ironside considered unfit for the job. The Secretary of State for War, Leslie Hore-Belisha, gave him official notice that he was deemed too old for the post, aged 57. Thus, he was appointed an aide-de-camp to the King in October, a purely ceremonial position, and early in 1938 accepted the offer of Governor of Gibraltar, generally seen as a quiet role where to retire.

He was helped to accept Gibraltar by the suggestion that, in the event of war, he could be transferred to command the forces in the Middle East; as he believed no major force could usefully be sent to France, this seemed to him likely to be the main focus of British attention in the war. He took up the governorship in November 1938, and threw himself into preparing the colony for war; here, finally, he had free rein. Under his tenure, the defences were strengthened and the garrison prepared for a long siege.

In December 1938, only a month after he had taken up the post, Hore-Belisha had begun to consider the possibility of recalling Ironside to become Inspector-General of Overseas Forces. The position gave him overall responsibility for the readiness of forces based outside the United Kingdom, and many at the War Office worried that he might interpret this as a precursor to being given formal command of the Expeditionary Force on the outbreak of war. By spring 1939, Special Branch was treating seriously the rumours within the British Union of Fascists that Ironside was a secret member of BUF. He had also attended an Anglo-German Fellowship event in the company of Unity Mitford. After some debate, Hore-Belisha went ahead and offered Ironside the position of Inspector-General in May, appointing a corresponding Inspector-General of Home Forces at the same time, both under Lord Gort's command. The decision to recall Ironside may have been helped by the fact that Hore-Belisha was particularly reliant on the advice of Liddell Hart, an old acquaintance of Ironside's, who was already beginning to fall out with Gort. Ironside assumed his new role on 1 July 1939.

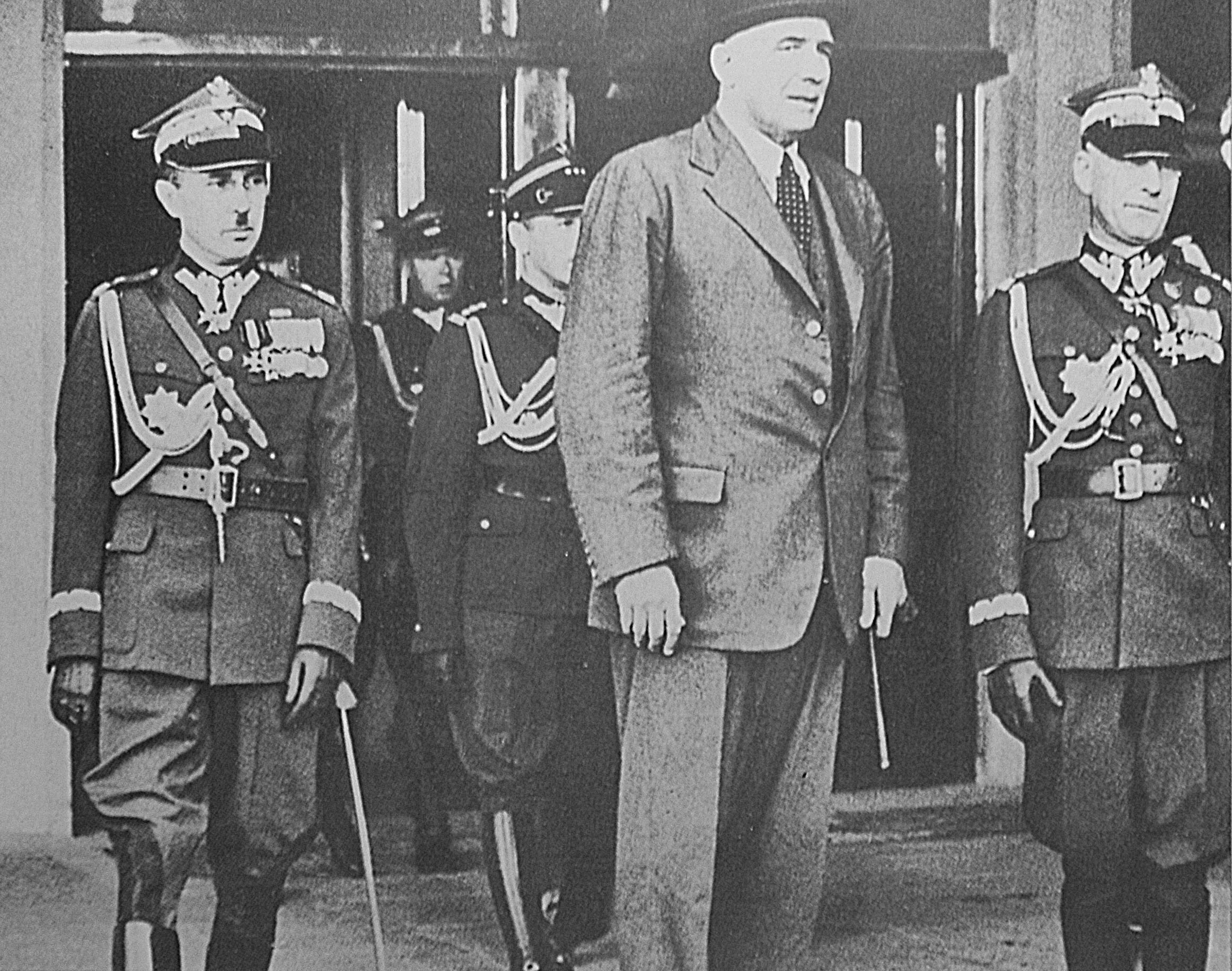
Ironside (centre) with Polish Chief of Staff General Wacław Stachiewicz (left)

As expected, Ironside chose to interpret the posting as indicating that he was the presumptive Commander-in-Chief, and soon began to clash with Lord Gort over their respective powers. Whilst Gort was nominally in the more senior position, Ironside had seniority of rank and a far more dominant personality, and had concluded several months earlier that Gort was "out of his depth" as CIGS; he is unlikely to have shown much deference. He held the post of Inspector for a few months, visiting Poland in July 1939 to meet with the Polish High Command and observe military exercises. Whilst his sympathetic manner reassured the Poles, the visit may have unintentionally given the impression that Britain was intending to provide direct military assistance. He returned able to report that the Polish Government was unlikely to provoke Germany into war, but warned that the country would be quickly overrun and that no Eastern Front was likely to exist for long. His warnings, however, were broadly ignored. According to another source, on 27 August he gave Churchill a "most favourable" account of the Polish army's capability.

== Second World War ==
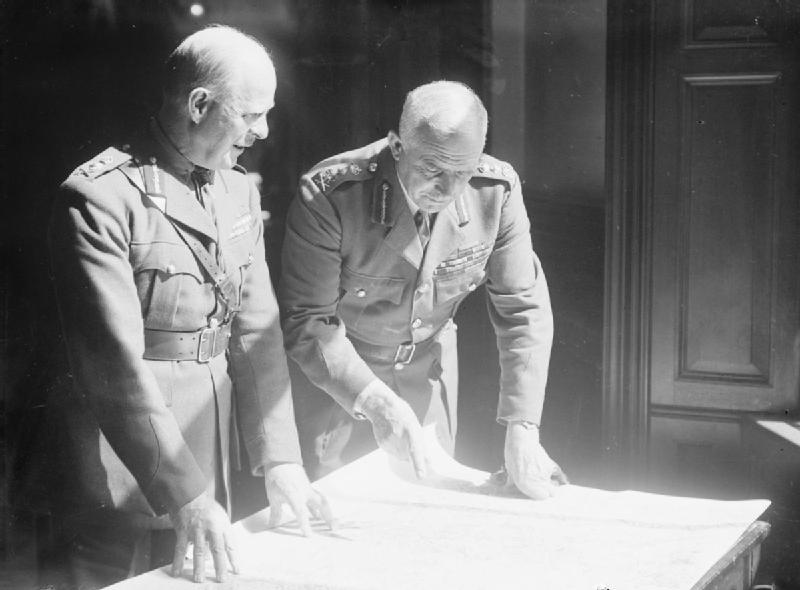
Ironside (right) with Lord Gort (left) at the War Office in 1940

His appointment on 3 September 1939 as Chief of the Imperial General Staff (CIGS) came as something of a surprise to Ironside; he had been led to believe he would be appointed as the Commander-in-Chief of the British Expeditionary Force (BEF), and indeed had already despatched his Assistant to Aldershot to begin preparing his headquarters. The reorganisation was politically driven; Hore-Belisha had fallen out heavily with Lord Gort during 1939, and the outbreak of war provided an excellent pretext for Gort to leave Whitehall. This left the post of CIGS vacant, and after heavy lobbying by Churchill, Ironside was chosen over Sir John Dill, then the General Officer Commanding, Aldershot Command.

On 4 September, Ironside told the Cabinet that Poland could resist for six months and suggested a future support operation via Romania. However, he violently opposed the French plan of opening a front in the Balkans. At the Anglo-French Supreme War Council of 22 September, the British chiefs of staff backed the Romanian conception of a neutral Balkan bloc. In the first half of September, Hore-Belisha notified Ironside of MI5 concerns over his connections.

As CIGS, Ironside adopted a policy of rapidly building up a strong force in France, aiming to put some twenty divisions in the field. However, this force would be broadly defensive, acting to support the French Army, and he aimed to influence the course of the war by forming a second strong force in the Middle East, which would be able to operate in peripheral operations in the Balkans. He strongly supported the development of a close-support air force, preferably under Army command, but at the same time argued that when a German offensive began in the West, the Royal Air Force (RAF) should throw its main strength into strategic bombing of the Ruhr rather than attacking the forward units.

=== Norway ===
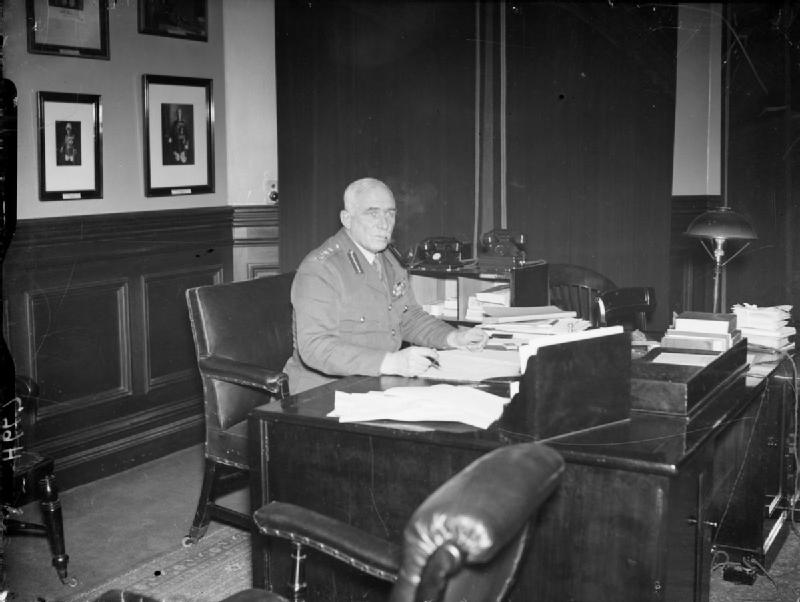
General Sir William Edmund Ironside, the newly appointed CIGS, pictured here at his desk sometime in 1939

Ironside's enthusiasm for "peripheral" operations led him in November 1939 to plans for Allied intervention in Scandinavia, initially to help Norway against the Soviet Union. He accepted the risk of an Anglo-Soviet war and opposed the build-up of the British Expeditionary Force in France. By December, in place of Churchill's limited approach of simply mining Norwegian waters to stop Swedish iron ore shipments to Germany, he argued for landing a strong force in northern Norway and physically occupying the Swedish orefields. If successful, this would allow the resupply of Finland – then fighting the Soviet Union, and aligned loosely with the Allied forces – as well as interdicting Germany's ore supply, and could potentially force Germany to commit troops on a new and geographically unfavourable front. Both Ironside and Churchill supported the plan enthusiastically, but it met with opposition from many other officers, including from Gort – who saw his forces in France being depleted of resources – and from Cyrill Newall, the Chief of the Air Staff.

Planning continued through the winter of 1939–1940. Ironside welcomed the agreement reached at the Anglo-French Supreme War Council conference of 5 February 1940 to land two British divisions and additional forces supplied by France, including the Polish Independent Highland Brigade and the French Foreign Legion, at Narvik and Trondheim by mid-March with the aim of securing the Swedish mines of Gällivare and Kiruna. He regarded the plan as favouring British expertise in the north and as an opportunity to seize initiative in the war. During February 1940, he also considered air attacks on the Soviet refineries in Baku. As he warned Marshal Carl Gustaf Emil Mannerheim in February, however, only a fraction of the Scandinavian expeditionary force was going to reach Finland. The plan for the landings relied on Finnish pleas for military assistance to justify the "semi-peaceable" invasion of neutral Scandinavia, but Norway and Sweden refused the Allied and Finnish requests for the passage of troops in late February. After Lord Halifax was notified of the Finnish–Soviet peace negotiations on 1 March, Ironside offered Mannerheim 57,000 British troops, even though they were not ready to sail, hoping to buy time to conduct the operation. On 12 March, however, the Moscow Peace Treaty was concluded, and the expedition had to be abandoned.

A few days prior to the German invasion of Norway in April 1940 as part of Operation Weserübung, Ironside was embarrassed by the publication of an interview intended to influence the United States, in which he dared Nazi Germany to attack Norway. The Norwegian campaign of April–June 1940 saw significant British forces committed to action for the first time in the Second World War. Flaws in the command system quickly began to show. War Cabinet meetings dragged on at great length to little effect, as did meetings of the Chiefs of Staff, both to Ironside's great frustration. He also found it hard to cope with Churchill's mood swings and insistence on micromanagement of the campaign, and a gulf began to grow between the two. Ironside's main contribution to resolving the Norwegian campaign was to insist on a withdrawal when the situation worsened, and he pushed through the evacuation of the unbeaten British force in central Norway at the end of April despite ministerial ambivalence (Churchill had wanted to assign guerrilla tasks to the troops) and without consulting the French.

=== Battle of France ===
Ironside himself was sent to France in May 1940 to liaise with the BEF and the French in an attempt to halt the German advance. He was not well-qualified for this task, having a deep dislike and distrust for the French, whom he considered "absolutely unscrupulous in everything". At a conference in Lens he clashed with the French generals Gaston-Henri Billotte and Georges Maurice Jean Blanchard, whom he considered defeatists. He wrote: "I lost my temper and shook Billotte by the button of his tunic. The man is completely defeated." Although Billotte was supposed to be co-ordinating the British, French and Belgian armies' operations in Belgium, Ironside took over the job himself, ordering Gort and Blanchard to launch a counter-attack against the Germans at Arras. This attack achieved some local success, but the German onslaught proved unstoppable. The French Commander-in-Chief, General Maxime Weygand, so resented Ironside's actions that he said he would "like to box Ironside's ears." Ironside, despairing of the French Army's unwillingness to fight, accepted Gort's view that evacuation of the BEF was the only answer.

=== Home Defence ===
In his diary on the afternoon of 25 May, Ironside wrote that "I am now concentrating upon the Home Defence ... [The Cabinet] want(s) a change to some man well-known in England. They are considering my appointment". That night, he spoke to Churchill, offering to take up the new post, and – again from his diary:

I was told that I had to take over the command in England and organise that. I am to be made a Field Marshal later. Not at once, because the public may think that I am being given a sop and turned out. An honour for me and a new and most important job, one much more to my liking than C.I.G.S. in every way.

His appointment as Commander-in-Chief, Home Forces was announced to the public on 27 May, succeeding General Sir Walter Kirke. At the same time Ironside was succeeded as CIGS by his deputy, Sir John Dill. In his new command, Ironside commanded a force which amounted – on paper – to fifteen Territorial Infantry divisions, a single armoured division, fifty-seven home-defence battalions, and the Local Defence Volunteers (later the Home Guard). However, all of these were deficient in training and organisation, as the operational units had already been sent to France. They were also lacking in equipment; the force as a whole had almost no modern artillery or anti-tank guns, and the armoured division had just a small number of light tanks.

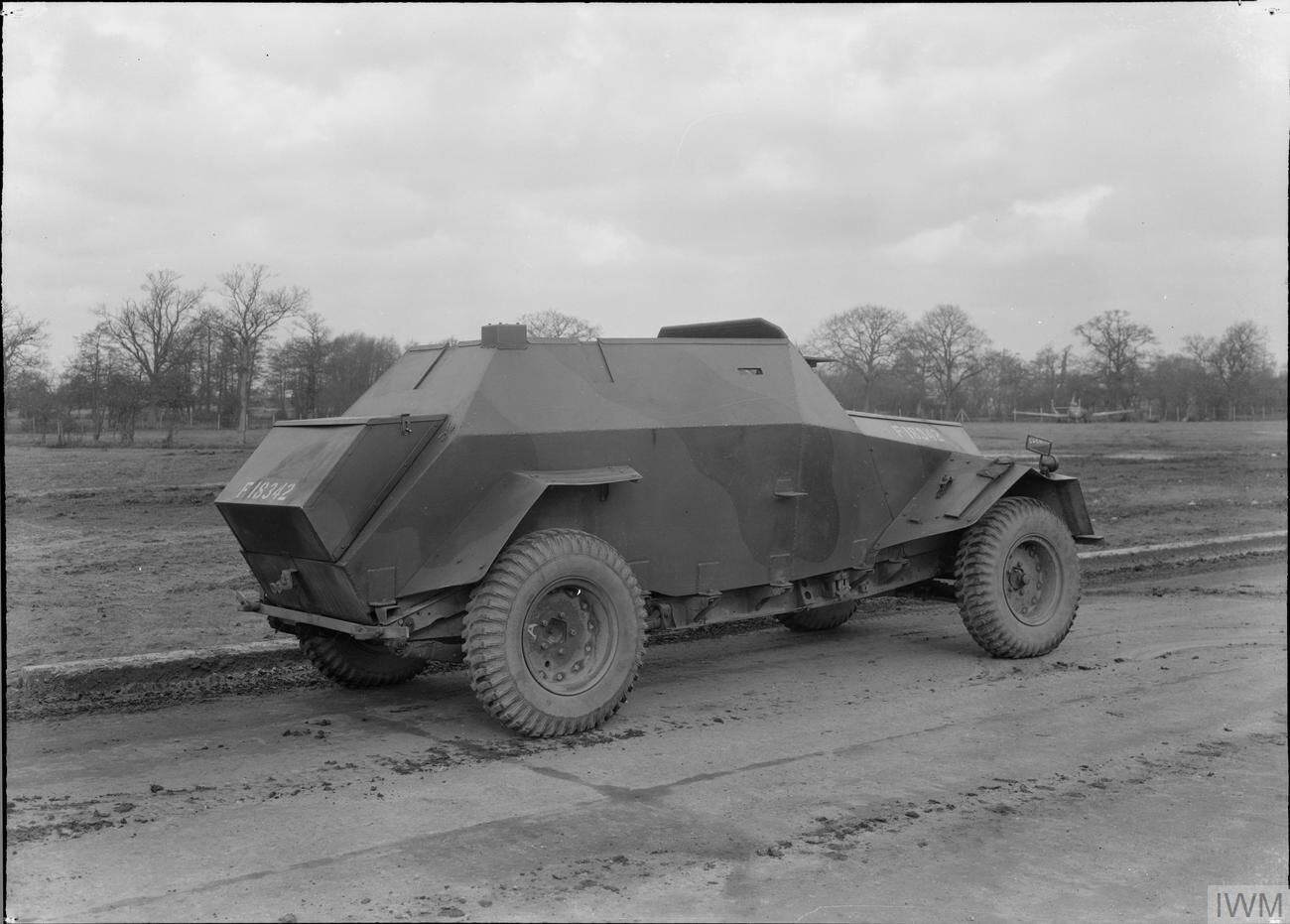
The Humber Light Reconnaissance Car or "Ironside" was based on a civilian motor car chassis.

The deficiencies with equipment led to an overall lack of mobility, which coupled with the limited training of the units meant that very few were capable of organised offensive counter-attacks against an invading force. As a result, the only way they could practically be used would be to commit them to static defence; Ironside planned to steadily pull units away from the coast and into a central mobile reserve, but this was not possible until they were trained and equipped for the role. He threw himself into the details of the strategy, laying out plans for the static defence of village strongpoints by the Home Guard, patrols of "Ironsides" armoured cars to strengthen the divisions, and light artillery mounted on trucks as improvised tank destroyers.

He agreed to release two divisions for the Second BEF in early June, but was dubious about Churchill's decision to bring home troops from the Middle East and India; even after the fall of France and the potential collapse of the defences in Britain, he still held to his pre-war position that "[it] is essential to hold the East firmly, whatever happens here". By mid-June, he had begun to collect a scanty mobile reserve – the 8th Royal Tank Regiment, with infantry tanks, and six regiments of armoured cars beginning to form – and the pillboxes and coastal defences were being prepared, though he emphasised to the local commanders that the latter "are only meant as delaying lines, and are meant to give the mobile columns a chance of coming up to the threatened points."

The fall of France led to a brief interlude where the Cabinet debated sending Ironside on a diplomatic mission to meet Charles Noguès, the French commander in North Africa and a personal acquaintance of Ironside's, but decided to retain him in Britain and send Lord Gort instead. On 25 June, he was called to the War Cabinet to brief them on the plans for Home Defence; his system of defence in depth provided for:

1. A defensive "crust" along the coast, able to fight off small raids, give immediate warning of attack, and delay any landings.
2. Home Guard roadblocks at crossroads, valleys, and other choke points, to stop German armoured columns penetrating inland.
3. Static fortified stop lines sealing the Midlands and London off from the coast, and dividing the coastal area into defensible sectors
4. A central corps-sized reserve to deal with a major breakthrough
5. Local mobile columns to deal with local attacks and parachute landings

The plan was "on the whole" approved by the Cabinet, and by the Chiefs of Staff later in the week. He was clear in his diaries that he saw the static focus as an undesirable option – "[the] eternal preaching of the defensive and taking cover behind anti-tank articles has been the curse of our tactics" – but that it was the only practical way to make use of untrained and badly-equipped forces. By early July, he was optimistic that more troops could soon be pulled out of static positions and used in a mobile role, with the Home Guard taking over the local defences, but strongly resisted orders from Churchill to pull divisions out of the coastal areas before they could be effectively replaced.

However, criticism of the "Ironside plan" was soon manifest. On 26 June (only a day after the plan's approval) at a meeting of the Vice-Chiefs of Staff, Air Marshal Richard Peirse pointed out that many of the RAF's main operational airfields would be overrun by an invader before they reached Ironside's principal stop line, the "GHQ Line". The conclusion of the meeting was that the plan was "completely unsound". Although Ironside managed to placate the Chiefs of Staff, discontent amongst his subordinates was growing; one divisional commander wrote "We have become pill-box mad". There was widespread concern that troops were spending their time constructing defences rather than on the training which they desperately needed. Another critic was Major-General Bernard Montgomery, who later wrote that he found himself "in complete disagreement with the general approach to the defence of Britain and refused to apply it." When Churchill visited Montgomery's 3rd Infantry Division on 2 July, he described to the prime minister how his division, which was fully equipped except for transport, could be made into a mobile formation by the requisitioning of municipal buses, able to strike at the enemy beachheads rather than strung out along the coast as ordered. Finally, on 17 July, Churchill had a long drive with Lieutenant-General Sir Alan Brooke, the commander of Southern Command, whose views on creating mobile reserves held close to possible landing sites were in accordance with his own.

In addition, Ironside had been a friend and mentor of J.F.C. Fuller from his time at the Staff College in the 1920s, and was a strong supporter of his arguments for modernisation of the Army into a mobile force. Following his retirement from the Army in 1933, Fuller became associated with the British Union of Fascists, and was a strong opponent of war with Germany. After Ironside was appointed CIGS in 1939, he asked for Fuller to be re-appointed to a staff role, citing the role of German mechanised forces in the defeat of Poland, but this was vetoed by the Prime Minister Neville Chamberlain on political grounds. Fuller appears to have seen Ironside as sympathetic to his beliefs, and in late 1939, he told fellow fascist Barry Domvile that "Ironside is with us". Ironside's name was mentioned by both John Beckett and Leigh Vaughan-Henry in connection with plans for a fascist coup, though there is no indication Ironside himself was aware of this. Vaughan-Henry's accomplice Samuel Darwin-Fox went as far as to predict that Ironside would become the dictator of Britain if his coup were successful. This friendship with Fuller may nonetheless have become a liability towards the end of his career; one historian reports that "whispers" were circulating about his association with a known fascist as early as May 1940.

On 19 July, Ironside was summoned to the War Office and informed that he was to be replaced by Brooke as C-in-C Home Forces, effective immediately. The formal reason was that the Cabinet wished to have someone with recent combat experience in command, and Ironside accepted the dismissal gracefully – "I was quite prepared to be released. I had done my best ... I can't complain. Cabinets have to make decisions in times of stress. I don't suppose that Winston liked doing it, for he is always loyal to his friends." On his arrival at Home Forces HQ, Brooke was astonished that Ironside had not stayed to apprise him of the situation; neither had he left him any notes except for a brief memo to say that he had arranged for Brooke to use his staff car.

== Retirement and writing ==
At the end of August, a month and a half after his resignation as Commander-in-Chief of Home Forces, Ironside was appointed a field marshal. He was raised to the peerage in the New Year Honours, on 29 January 1941, as "Baron Ironside of Archangel and of Ironside in the County of Aberdeen", and retired to Morley Old Hall in Norfolk with his family. He never received another military posting and, ostracised by the Army establishment, rarely visited London, and never spoke in the House of Lords.

He turned to lecturing and writing books, including a study of the Archangel expedition, and farming his estates in Norfolk. After almost two decades in retirement, having survived a driving accident, he was injured in a fall at his home; he was taken to Queen Alexandra Military Hospital in London where he died on 22 September 1959, aged 79. His coffin was escorted to Westminster Abbey with full military honours, and he was buried near his home at Hingham, Norfolk. He is commemorated by a memorial plaque in the crypt of St Paul's Cathedral.

Ironside kept a diary throughout his life, starting as a subaltern at the turn of the century, with the goal of keeping a clear recollection of what had happened during the day and allowing him to reflect on the day's events. These were written directly into bound foolscap volumes, a page or more a day, each night; throughout his life, he totalled some twelve volumes and the best part of a million words. He did not ask for these to be destroyed on his death, though their content was sometimes quite contentious, but did write a will – in 1930 – asking that they not be published. In the late 1950s, however, a former colleague persuaded him to allow extracts to be published as part of an account of the run-up to the Second World War, although he died shortly before it saw print. This was published as The Ironside Diaries: 1937–1940, edited by Colonel Roderick Macleod and Denis Kelly, in 1962; the material was selected from May 1937 to his retirement in June 1940, and published as numbered daily entries with editorial notes.

A second volume, High Road to Command: the diaries of Major-General Sir Edmund Ironside, 1920–1922, was published in 1972, edited by his son; this covered the period from 1920 to 1922, during his service in the Middle East. The book was assembled by Ironside shortly before his death and, whilst it drew heavily on the diaries, it was written in a more conventional narrative form rather than as a strict day-by-day account, with editorial remarks kept to a minimum.

== Honours ==
Ribbon bar:

- Knight Grand Cross of the Order of the Bath (GCB) in the 1938 King's Birthday Honours (9 June 1938); (KCB: 1 August 1919)
- Companion of the Order of St Michael and St George (CMG) on 1 January 1918
- Companion of the Distinguished Service Order (DSO) in the 1915 King's Birthday Honours (23 June 1915)
- Knight of the Most Venerable Order of Saint John in June 1939
- Mentioned in despatches (10 September 1901, 4 December 1914, 22 June 1915, 15 June 1916, 15 May 1917, 11 December 1917, 20 December 1918, 21 May 1920)
- Queen's South Africa Medal (clasps: Cape Colony, Orange Free State, Transvaal)
- King's South Africa Medal (clasps: South Africa 1901, South Africa 1902)
- 1914 Star
- British War Medal
- Victory Medal
- General Service Medal (1918) North-West Persia Clasp
- Virtuti Militari (Poland)
- Cross of St. George (Russia)
- Knight of the Order of St Anna (Russia)
- Order of the Lion and the Sun (Persia, 1921)
- Order of the Rising Sun, 3rd Class (6 February 1922, Japan)
- Grand Croix de la Légion d'Honneur in 1946 (France), previously Officier
- Croix de Guerre avec Palme (France)
- Order of St. Vladimir (Russia)
- Baron Ironside of Archangel and of Ironside in the County of Aberdeen, in the 1941 New Year Honours (29 January 1941)

Coat of arms of Edmund Ironside, 1st Baron Ironside
Crest A dexter hand gauntletted grasping a sword paleways Argent hilted and pommelled Or. Escutcheon Per bend Sable and Gules on a bend Argent a bendlet wavy Azure in sinister chief a garb Or and in base a lion salient Or and in fess a dexter gauntletted hand grasping a sword paleways Argent hilted Or. Supporters Two bull terriers Proper. Motto Fear Not Hold Fast

== Bibliography ==
=== Articles ===
- Cairns, John C (September 2004). "Ironside, (William) Edmund, first Baron Ironside (1880–1959)". Oxford Dictionary of National Biography (online ed.). Oxford University Press. doi:10.1093/ref:odnb/34113. (Subscription, Wikipedia Library access or UK public library membership required.)
- Holden Reid, Brian (September 2009). "Fuller, John Frederick Charles (1878–1966)". Oxford Dictionary of National Biography (online ed.). Oxford University Press. doi:10.1093/ref:odnb/33290. (Subscription, Wikipedia Library access or UK public library membership required.)
- Nicolson, Harold (1940). "Ironside". Foreign Affairs. 18 (4): 671–679. doi:10.2307/20029035. JSTOR 20029035.
- Barclay, Glen (1979), "Diversion in the East: The Western Allies, Scandinavia, and Russia, November 1939-April 1940", The Historian, 41 (3): 483–498, doi:10.1111/j.1540-6563.1979.tb00556.x
- Imlay, Talbot Charles (2004), "A Reassessment of Anglo-French Strategy during the Phony War, 1939–1940", English Historical Review, 119 (481): 333–372, doi:10.1093/ehr/119.481.333

=== Primary and secondary sources ===
Official despatches

- Operations carried out by the Allied Forces under my Command during the period from 1 October 1918, to 11 August 1919

- in "No. 31850". The London Gazette (Supplement). 2 April 1920. pp. 4116–4118.

- Operations carried out by the Allied Forces under my Command during the period from 11 August 1919, to 27 September 1919.

- in "No. 31850". The London Gazette (Supplement). 2 April 1920. pp. 4130–4131.

Books

- Alanbrooke, Field Marshal Lord (2001). Danchev, Alex; Todman, Daniel (eds.). War Diaries 1939–1945. Phoenix Press. ISBN 1-84212-526-5.
- Bethell, Nicholas (1972). The War Hitler Won: The Fall of Poland, September 1939. New York: Holt, Rinehart and Winston. ISBN 978-0-03-001376-8.
- Bond, Brian (1999). "Ironside". Churchill's Generals. Abacus. ISBN 0-349-11317-3.
- Bond, Brian (1999). "Gort". Churchill's Generals. Abacus. ISBN 0-349-11317-3.
- Dorril, Stephen (2006). Blackshirt: Sir Oswald Mosley and British Fascism. London: Viking. ISBN 978-0-670-86999-2.
- Eastwood, James (1940). General Ironside. Pilot Press.
- Ghani, Cyrus (2001). Iran and the Rise of the Reza Shah: From Qajar Collapse to Pahlavi Power. London: I.B. Tauris. ISBN 978-1-86064-629-4.
- Heathcote, Tony (1999). The British Field Marshals 1736–1997. Pen & Sword. ISBN 0-85052-696-5.
- Ironside, Edmund (1962). The Ironside diaries, 1937–1940. Constable. ISBN 0-8371-7369-8.
- Ironside, Edmund (1972). High Road to Command: The Diaries of Major-Gen. Sir Edmund Ironside 1920–1922. Leo Cooper. ISBN 978-0750963794.
- Ironside, Edmund (2018). Ironside: The Authorised Biography of Field Marshal Lord Ironside. The History Press. ISBN 978-0850520774.
- Jackson, Julian (2003). The Fall of France. Oxford University Press. ISBN 0-19-280300-X.
- Kersaudy, François (1990). Norway 1940. London: Collins. ISBN 978-0-09-983420-5.
- McKinstry, Leo (2014). Operation Sealion. John Murray. ISBN 978-1-84854-704-9.
- Petrow, Richard (1974). The Bitter Years: The Invasion and Occupation of Denmark and Norway, April 1940–May 1945. New York: Morrow. ISBN 978-0-688-00275-6.
- Prażmowska, Anita J. (2004). Britain, Poland and the Eastern Front, 1939. Cambridge University Press. ISBN 0-521-52938-7.
- Quinlivian, Peter (2006). Forgotten Valour: The Story of Arthur Sullivan VC. Sydney: New Holland. ISBN 978-1-74110-486-8.
- Soutar, Andrew (1940). With Ironside in North Russia. Hutchinson.
- Wright, Damien (2017). Churchill's Secret War with Lenin: British and Commonwealth Military Intervention in the Russian Civil War, 1918–20. Solihull: Helion. ISBN 978-1911512103.

Other

- Newbold, David John. "BRITISH PLANNING AND PREPARATIONS TO RESIST INVASION ON LAND, SEPTEMBER 1939 – SEPTEMBER 1940". kclpure.kcl.ac.uk. King's College, University of London.
- Mead, Richard (2007). Churchill's Lions: A Biographical Guide to the Key British Generals of World War II. Stroud: Spellmount. ISBN 978-1-86227-431-0.
- Smart, Nick (2005). Biographical Dictionary of British Generals of the Second World War. Barnesley: Pen & Sword. ISBN 1844150496.

Military offices
Preceded by Hastings Anderson	Commandant of the Staff College, Camberley; 1922–1926	Succeeded by Charles Gwynn
Preceded by Peter Strickland	GOC 2nd Division; 1926–1928	Succeeded by Thomas Cubitt
Preceded by Sir Cyril Deverell	GOC-in-C Eastern Command; 1936–1938	Succeeded by Sir Guy Williams
Preceded by Sir Walter Kirke	C-in-C Home Forces; May–July 1940	Succeeded by Sir Alan Brooke
Preceded by The Viscount Gort	Chief of the Imperial General Staff; 1939–1940	Succeeded by Sir John Dill
Government offices
Preceded by Sir Charles Harington	Governor of Gibraltar; 1938–1939	Succeeded by Sir Clive Liddell
Peerage of the United Kingdom
New creation	Baron Ironside; 1941–1959	Succeeded by Edmund Ironside
