= Baron Ironside =

Barony in the Peerage of the United Kingdom

Baron Ironside, of Archangel and of Ironside in the County of Aberdeen, is a title in the Peerage of the United Kingdom. It was created in 1941 for Field Marshal Sir Edmund Ironside, previously Governor of Gibraltar and Chief of the Imperial General Staff. As of 2020 the title is held by his grandson, the third Baron, who succeeded in that year. The second baron was Deputy Chairman of the House of Lords from 1974 to 1977. However, he lost his seat in parliament after the passing of the House of Lords Act 1999.

The family seat is The Priory House, near Boxted, Essex.

== Barons Ironside (1941) ==
- (William) Edmund Ironside, 1st Baron Ironside (1880–1959)
- Edmund Oslac Ironside, 2nd Baron Ironside (1924–2020)
- Charles Edmund Grenville Ironside, 3rd Baron Ironside (b. 1956)

The heir apparent is the present holder's son, the Hon. Frederick Thomas Grenville Ironside (b. 1991).

== Arms ==
Coat of arms of Baron Ironside
Crest A dexter hand gauntletted grasping a sword paleways Argent hilted and pommelled Or. Escutcheon Per bend Sable and Gules on a bend Argent a bendlet wavy Azure in sinister chief a garb Or and in base a lion salient Or and in fess a dexter gauntletted hand grasping a sword paleways Argent hilted Or. Supporters Two bull terriers Proper. Motto Fear Not Hold Fast
