= Ralph Ironside =

Archdeacon of Dorset

Ralph Ironside was Archdeacon of Dorset from 1671 until 1683. He was the son of Ralph Ironside, rector of Long Bredy, Dorset, and the younger brother of Gilbert Ironside, Bishop of Bristol. He was educated at Wadham College, Oxford and later held incumbencies at Netherbury and Long Bredy. He died on 5 March 1683, being buried at Long Bredy.

Church of England titles
Preceded by Richard Meredith	Archdeacon of Dorset; 1671–1683	Succeeded by John Feilding
