= William Benn (Lord Mayor of London) =

British merchant and politician

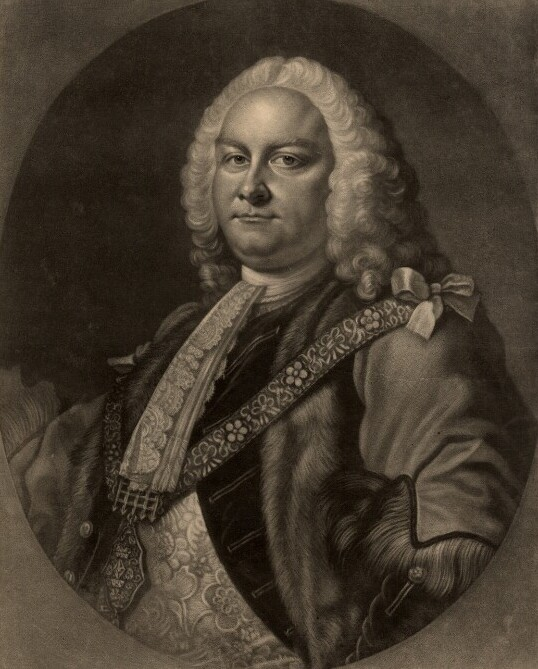
c. 1747 engraving of Benn by John Faber the Younger

William Benn (1682 – 10 August 1755) was a British merchant and politician who served as Lord Mayor of London in 1746.

Benn was a member of the Fletchers Company. He was a common councilor of the City of London for Bishopsgate from 1730 to 1740 and was Auditor from 1739 to 1741. He was elected Alderman of Aldersgate Ward on 12 November 1740. In 1742 he was Sheriff of London. He became Lord Mayor of London for the year 1746 to 1747.

Benn was a Jacobite, and he sent a message of support to Charles Stuart while Lord Mayor. He was President of Bridewell and Bethlehem Hospitals from 1746 to 1755. In 1749 he was involved in a drunken fight with another Alderman at a London City feast after proposing a toast to the health of the Young Pretender. He was the originator of the so-called 'Benn's Club', consisting of himself and five other aldermen who were all Tories with Jacobite sympathies. The other five were Sir Henry Marshall (Lord Mayor 1744–5) John Blachford (Lord Mayor 1750), Robert Alsop (Lord Mayor 1752), Edward Ironside (Lord Mayor 1753) and Sir Thomas Rawlinson (Lord Mayor 1753–4). In 1753 he stood in for Edmund Ironside who was indisposed on the day of his inauguration, and rode in the State Coach and performed the honours of the day in his place.

Benn died, aged 73 years, on 10 August 1755 and was buried at St Mary the Virgin Churchyard Braughing, Hertfordshire. His wife Mary died in 1773.

Civic offices
| Preceded by Sir Richard Hoare | Lord Mayor of London; 1746 | Succeeded by Sir Robert Ladbroke |
