= Edward Meetkerke =

Edward Meetkerke (1590 – August 1657) was an English clergyman and academic, Regius Professor of Hebrew at Oxford from 1620.

== Life ==
He was born in the parish of St Botolph, Aldersgate, London, and baptized in the Dutch Church, Austin Friars, on 29 September 1590. He was the only son of Sir Adolphus van Meetkerke, ambassador to England from the States-General of the Netherlands, by his second wife, Margaret (1549–1594), daughter of John Lichtervelde of Flanders. He was educated at Westminster School, was elected to Christ Church, Oxford, in 1606, and matriculated on 16 January 1607. He graduated B.A. in 1610, was chosen student, and became a tutor in his college. In 1613 he proceeded M.A., was incorporated M.A. at Cambridge in 1617, and received the B.D. degree at Oxford with a license to preach on 19 June 1620. He became D.D. on 26 May 1625.

Meetkerke was elected to the regius professorship of Hebrew at Oxford on 8 November 1620. He resigned it in 1626 on being presented to the rectory of Easton, Hampshire. On 9 January 1631, he installed the prebendary of Winchester Cathedral. Under the Commonwealth, he was deprived of his prebend and retired to his rectory, where he died in August 1657, and was buried in the middle of the chancel of the church. Having inherited his father's estate and bought a property in Hampshire, he died comparatively rich.

== Works ==
There are some poems by Meetkerke in the Oxford collections of 1619 on the death of Anne of Denmark, and of 1625 on the death of James I of England on the marriage of Charles I. The first of these poems is in Latin; the two latter are in Hebrew.

== Family ==
By his wife Barbara, daughter of the Rev. Dr. More, who survived him, he had a son, Adolf (1628–1664), M.A. of Christ Church, Oxford, and a daughter, Frances, married to Nathaniel Naper or Napier.
