= Old Ironsides (bar) =

Coordinates: 38°34′13″N 121°29′52″W

- Industry: Dive bar
- Founded: 1934
- Founder: William "Bill" Bordisso
- Headquarters: 901 10th St., Sacramento, California, 95811
- Owner: Bret Bair and Eric Rushing
- Website: theoldironsides.com

Old Ironsides is a historic dive bar located at 1901 10th St., Sacramento, California. It was established in 1934.

== History ==
William "Bill" Bordisso opened Old Ironsides, named for the warship USS Constitution, in 1934. It was the first establishment in Sacramento to obtain a liquor license after the end of Prohibition. In the 1950s, the location featured a game room and bottle shop and filled orders for Sacramento politicians and lobbyists. In the 1960s, the restaurant was a hotspot for its cocktail hour. It remained family-owned and operated by Bordisso's descendants, the Kanelos family, until 2024, when Bret Bair and Eric Rushing, founders of Ace of Spades in Sacramento, bought the business.

The bar is known for its live music, and acts such Sublime, Oleander, Death Cab for Cutie, Everclear, and Cake have performed there. Additionally, comedians such as Jay Mohr, Aisha Tyler, Johnny Steele, and Katt Williams have entertained at the bar.

Old Ironsides serves weekday Greek and Italian lunches, and plays host nightly to music acts.
