= Humber light reconnaissance car =

British armoured car

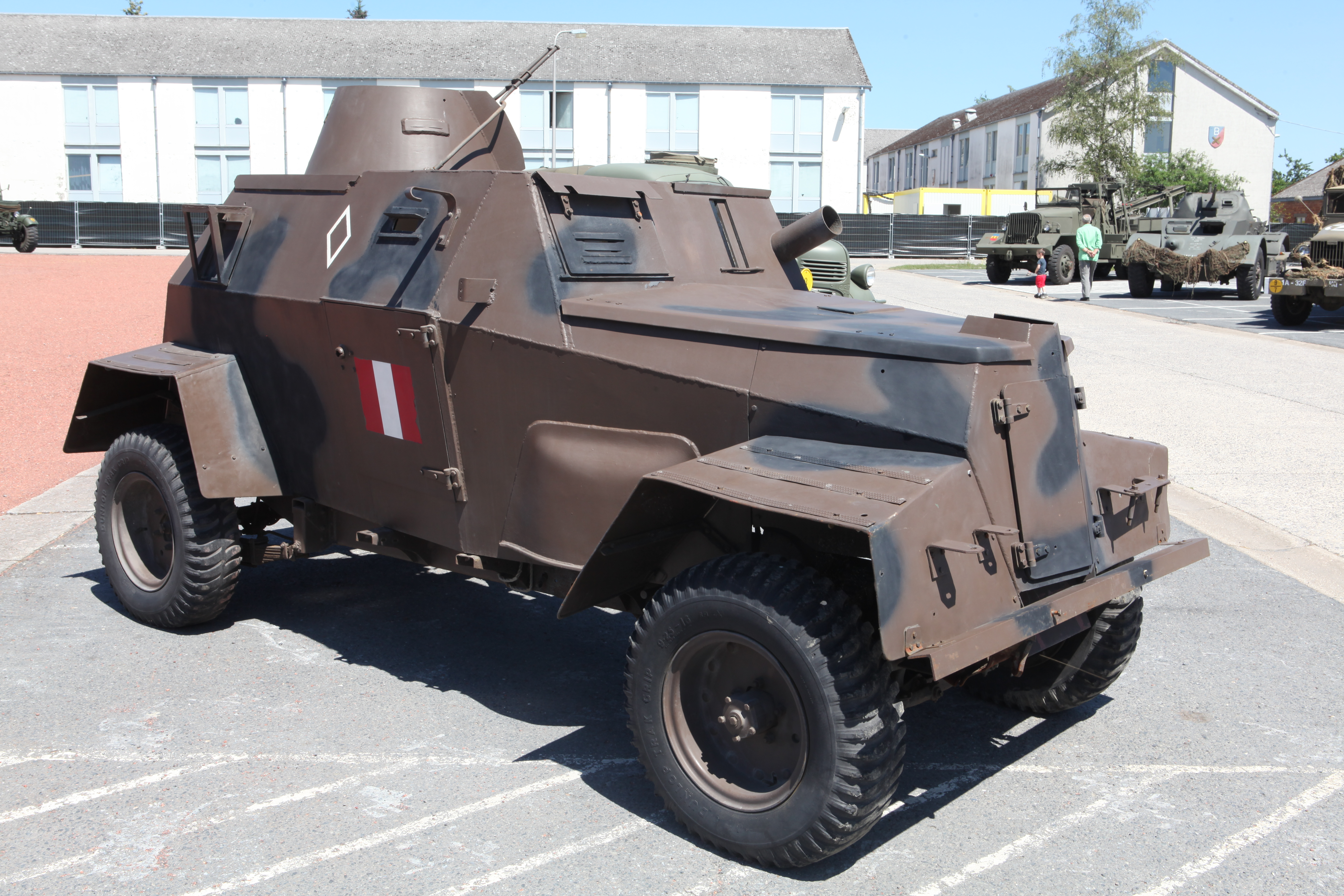
- Humber LRC Mk III
- Type: Light Armoured Car
- Place of origin: United Kingdom

Production history
- Manufacturer: Humber (Rootes Group)
- Produced: 1940–1943
- No. built: more than 2,400

Specifications (Mark II)
- Mass: 3.17 tons
- Length: 14 ft 4 in (4.37 m)
- Width: 6 ft 2 in (1.88 m)
- Height: 6 ft 11 in (2.11 m)
- Crew: 3
- Armour: up to 12 mm
- Main armament: Boys anti-tank rifle
- Secondary armament: 0.303 in (7.7 mm) Bren light machine gun; Smoke discharger
- Engine: 4.1 L 6-cylinder inline sidevalve petrol engine 80–87 hp (60–65 kW)
- Power/weight: 29 hp/tonne
- Drive: 4 x 2 wheel
- Operational range: 110 mi (180 km)
- Maximum speed: 75 mph (121 km/h) on road

The Humber light reconnaissance car, also known as Humberette or Ironside, was a British armoured car produced during the Second World War.

== Design ==
Produced by the Rootes Group, the Humber light reconnaissance car was an armoured car based on the Humber Super Snipe chassis (as was the Humber heavy utility car). It was equipped with a No. 19 radio set. From 1940 to 1943 over 3600 units were built.

== Operational history ==
The vehicle was used by infantry reconnaissance regiments and the RAF Regiment in Tunisia, Italy and Western Europe. After the war, some vehicles remained in service with the British units in India and in the Far East. The LRC was used widely by the Reconnaissance Corps and was also used by the Reconnaissance squadron of the 1st Czechoslovak Independent Armoured Brigade Group.

Three Mk I vehicles were modified for use by the British royal family and the cabinet ministers and were known as "Special Ironside Saloons".

== Variants ==
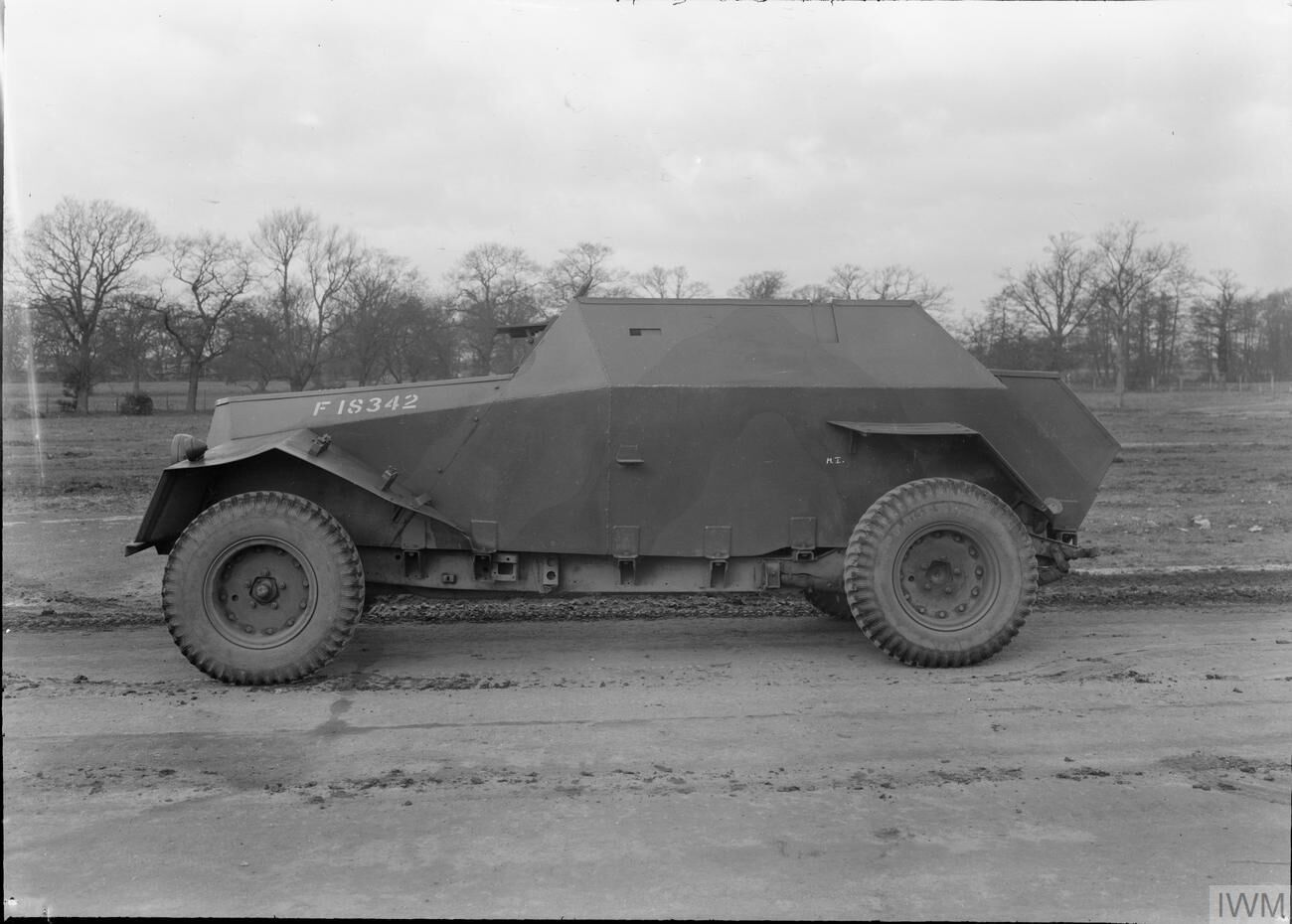
Mk I.

- Mk I

The original version with open-topped hull and 4×2 drive. Armoured to a maximum of 10 mm on the front and 7–9 mm on the sides. Armament was a Boys anti-tank rifle and a Bren light machine gun. Only a limited number were built before the Mk I was replaced by the Mk II.

- Mk II

The Mk II had an enclosed roof with a turret for the machine gun and retained the 4×2 drive of the Mk I. The Boys faced forward in the front of the hull. Otherwise armoured as the Mark I, the roof was 7 mm and the turret 6 mm.

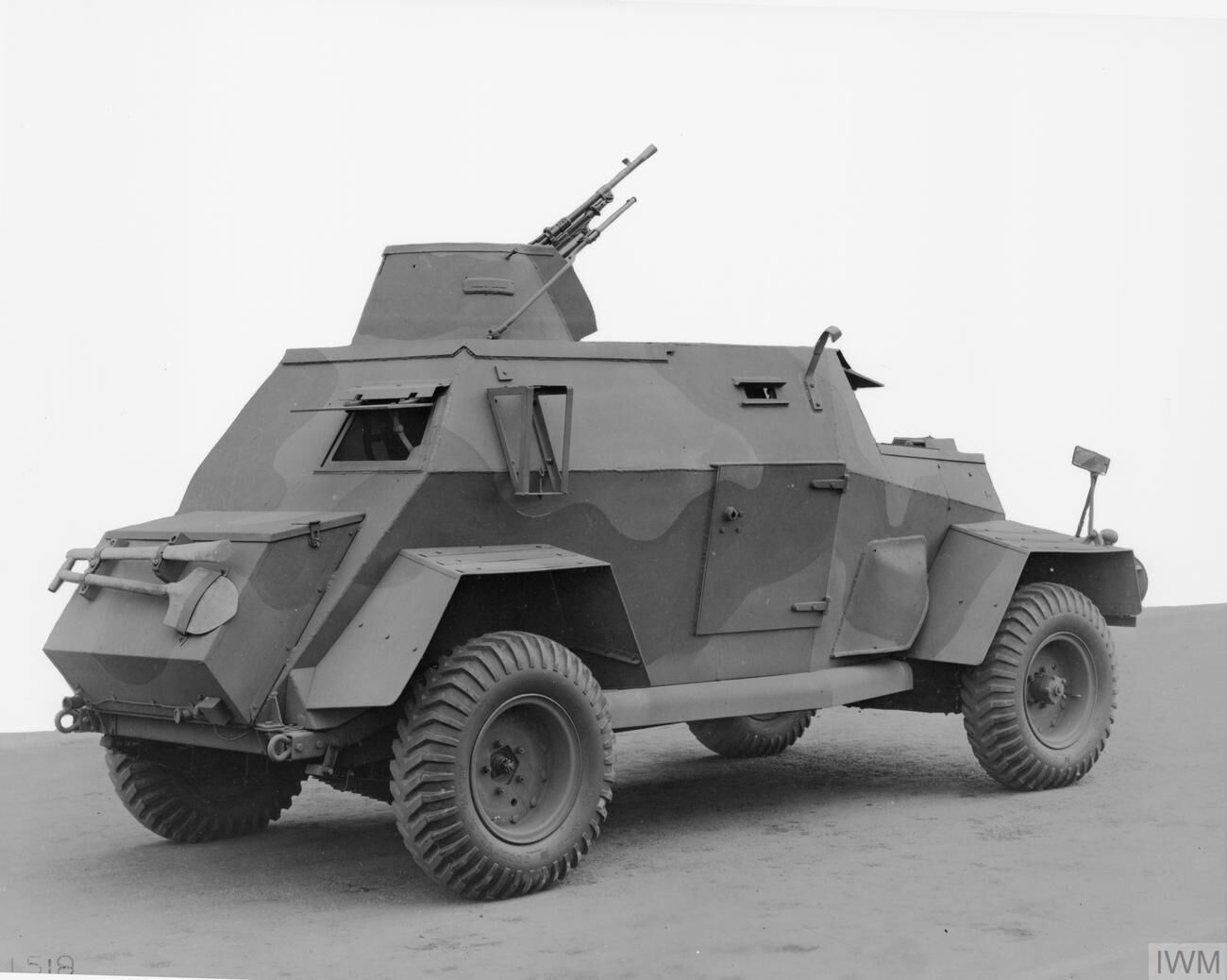
Mk III.

- Mk III (1941)

The Mk III was externally similar to the Mk II but had 4×4 drive. Production began in late 1941.

- Mk IIIA (1943)

The only difference from the Mk III was additional vision ports at the front angles of the hull. Armour was 12 mm to the front, 8 mm to the sides, 7 on the roof and rear, and 6 mm on the turret.

- Ironside Special Saloon

Built for VIP use, Thrupp & Maberly provided a relatively luxurious interior which was split by a Perspex screen to separate driver and passengers. A passenger side door was provided to make entrance and exit easier and the driver had a side hatch, the two-part screen running in tracks fitted to the front seats: sliding both portions to the driver's (right) side allowed the front passenger (left) seat back to be folded for an easier exit. Two Ironside 'specials' of this kind were used by cabinet ministers and members of the royal family, while six minus the privacy screen were used as armoured staff cars.

In all 3,600 Humber light reconnaissance cars were built (including the 200 Ironside Is) and the MkIII and MkIIIA were the cars most widely used by the Reconnaissance Corps in action, and many were also employed overseas by the RAF Regiment for airfield defence.

== Surviving vehicles ==
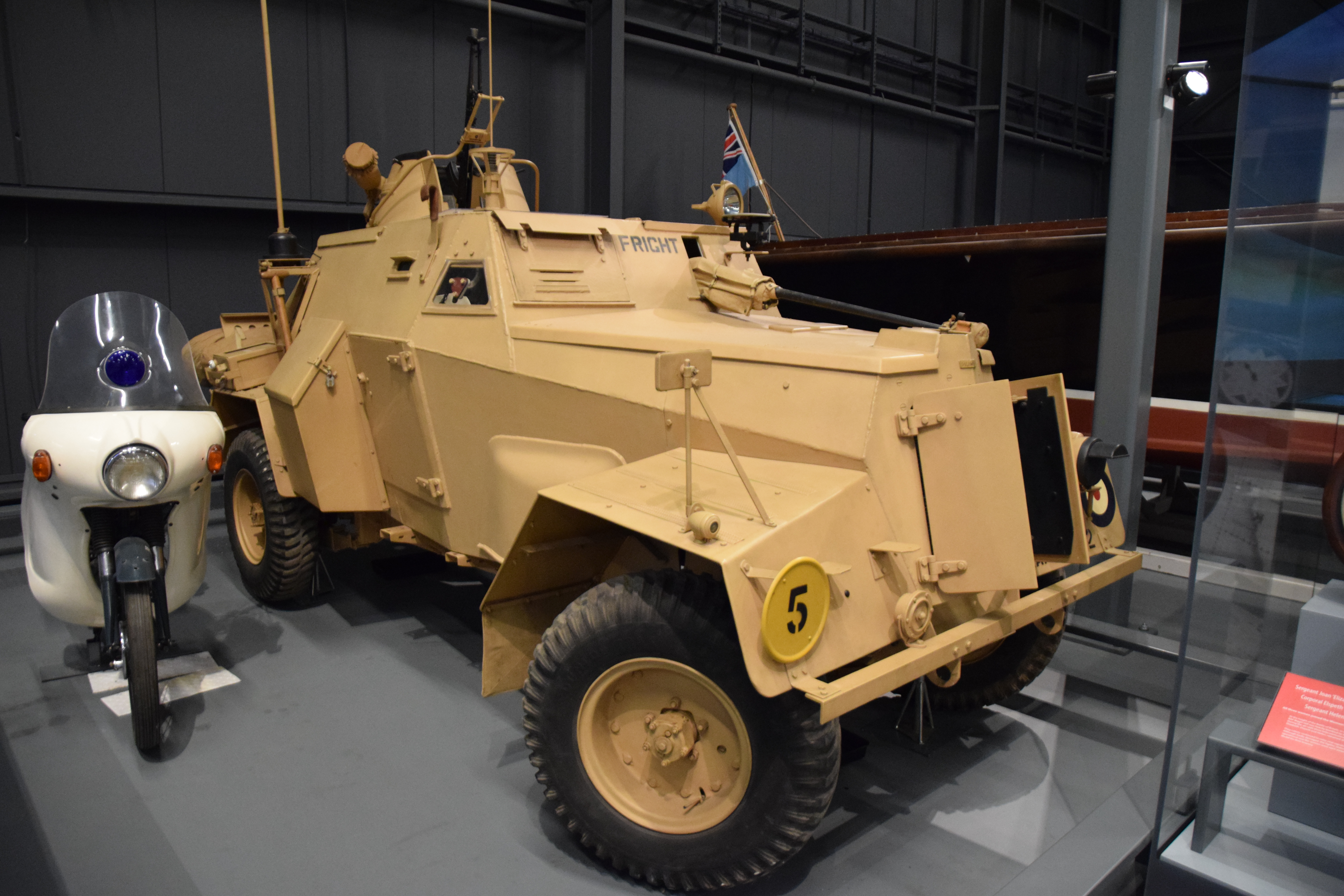
RAF Museum MkIIIA

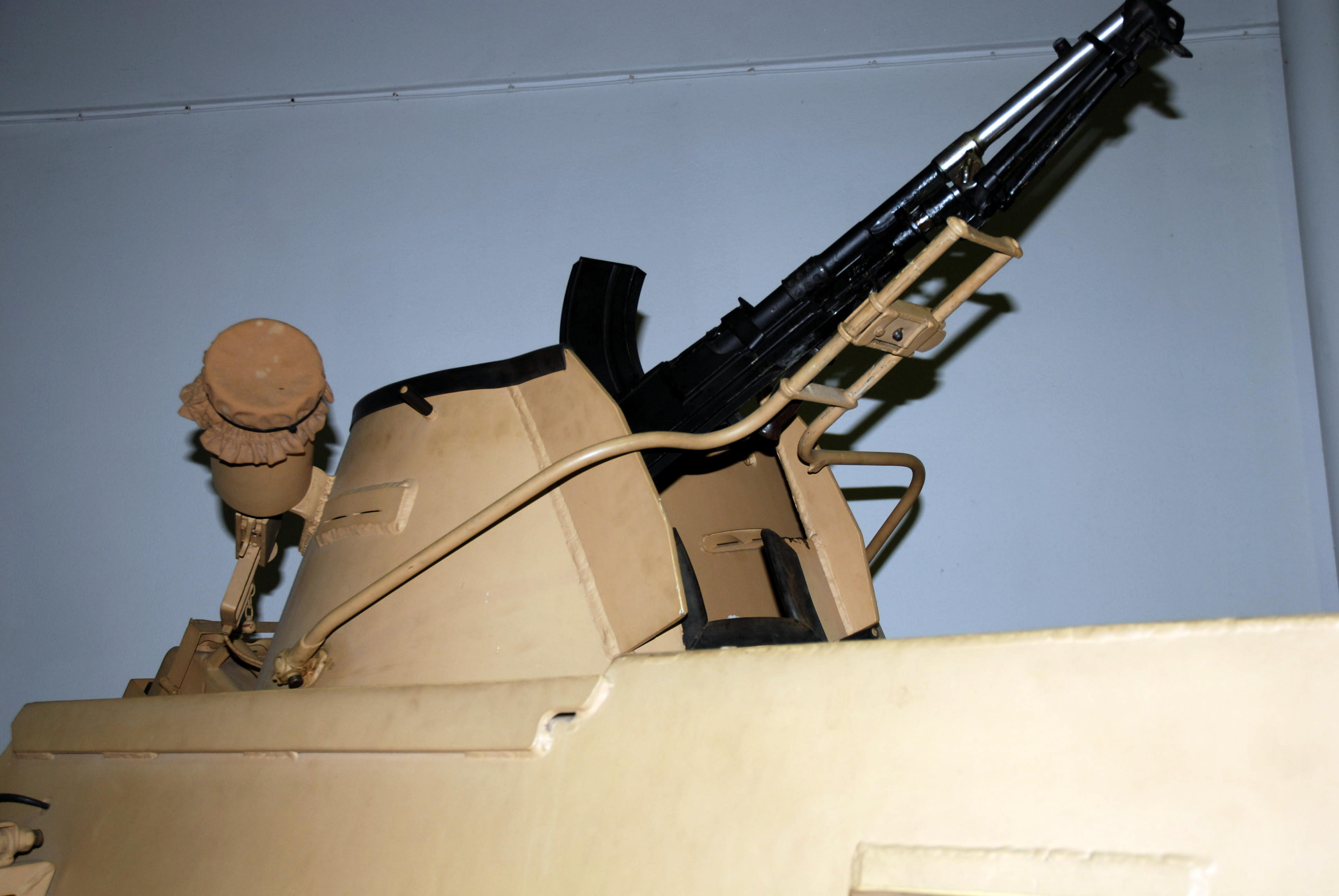
Turret detail RAF Museum MkIIIA

A number of vehicles are preserved in museums:

- Dutch Cavalry Museum
- Royal Museum of the Armed Forces and of Military History, Brussels, Belgium
- Royal Air Force Museum London has a Mk IIIA
- National War and Resistance Museum, Overloon has a restored Mk III.
- Military College of EME, Trimulgherry has an LRC as a gate guardian
- 43rd Reconnaissance Regiment Living History Group (UK) operate an LRC MK IIIa.

A reproduction also exists in private ownership in the Czech Republic.

A replica built on a postal jeep chassis and with wooden armour exists in Florida, where it is primarily used for re-enacting.

== See also ==
- Marmon-Herrington armoured car
- Leichter Panzerspähwagen
- Otter light reconnaissance car
