= Edward Ironside (Lord Mayor of London) =

British banker and Lord Mayor of London

Edward Ironside (25 February 1705 – 1753) was a British banker and Lord Mayor of London in 1753.

Ironside was born in the parish of St. Martin in the Fields, Westminster, the son of Edward Ironside and his wife Mary Gatton. He was apprenticed to his father on 8 November 1720 for seven years and was granted freedom of the city on 2 October 1728, and admitted to the Goldsmiths Company on 5 March 1729. He became a banker in business at the Black Lion, 65 Lombard Street. In 1730, he married Anne Newman.

Ironside became an alderman of Cordwainer ward on 18 October 1745. He was one of the members of the so-called 'Benn's Club', a group of Aldermen with Jacobite sympathies under the leadership of Alderman William Benn. He was Sheriff of London in the years 1748 to 1749. He became Lord Mayor of London on 9 November 1753. At his inauguration, he was so ill with gout that he had to be carried in a magnificent Sedan Chair. Alderman Benn rode in the State Coach and performed the honours of the day in his place.

Ironside's health did not improve, and he died on 27 November 1753, and was buried in the chancel of the church of St. Edmund, King and Martyr, Lombard Street. He had four sons and a daughter. His son, Edward, was a topographer, and his son Gilbert was a Colonel in the Bengal Army.

Civic offices
Preceded by Sir Crisp Gascoyne	Lord Mayor of London; 1753	Succeeded by Sir Thomas Rawlinson
