= Edmund Ironside, 2nd Baron Ironside =

British hereditary peer (1924–2020)

The Right Honourable The Lord Ironside
- 10-year-old Ironside, by Bassano

Member of the House of Lords
- In office 22 September 1959 – 11 November 1999; Hereditary Peerage
- Preceded by: 1st Baron Ironside

Personal details
- Born: Edmund Oslac Ironside; 21 September 1924
- Died: 13 January 2020 (aged 95) Boxted, Essex, England
- Occupation: Researcher

Edmund Oslac Ironside, 2nd Baron Ironside (21 September 1924 – 13 January 2020) was a British hereditary peer, who sat in the House of Lords from 1959 to 1999. Prior to entering the Lords, he served in the Royal Navy and worked for Marconi.

Upon the death of his father, Field Marshal Lord Ironside, in 1959, he succeeded to the title.

== Education and career ==
Ironside was the son of Mariot Ysobel (Cheyne) and William Edmund Ironside. Educated at Tonbridge School, Ironside joined the Royal Navy in 1943. He served until 1952, when he retired with the rank of Lieutenant, and joined Marconi Company. He left Marconi in 1959, joining English Electric Leo Computers, moving to Cryosystems Ltd. in 1964. In 1968 he joined the International Research and Development Company, where he spent sixteen years, before moving to manage defence sales at Northern Engineering Industries in 1984. When they were acquired by Rolls-Royce in 1989, he was kept on as a defence consultant, and finally retired from industrial work in 1995.

He was President of the Electric Vehicle Association and the European Electric Road Vehicle Association, the vice-president of the Institute of Patentees and Inventors, and the chairman of the advisory committee of the Science Reference Library. He also sat on the organising committee for the British Library at the time of its foundation in 1973, and was a member of the Court and the Council for City University and the University of Essex.

He edited the second volume of his father's diaries, High Road to Command, published in 1972.

== Marriage and children ==
Ironside married Audrey Marigold Morgan-Grenville (15 February 1931- 3 December 2015) on 29 April 1950. She was the daughter of Lt Col Hon Thomas George Breadalbane Morgan-Grenville, granddaughter of Mary Morgan-Grenville, 11th Lady Kinloss and great-granddaughter of Richard Temple-Nugent-Brydges-Chandos-Grenville, 3rd Duke of Buckingham and Chandos. The couple had two children:

- Hon Fiona Georgina Ironside (born 12 September 1954)
- Charles Edmund Grenville Ironside, 3rd Baron Ironside (born 1 July 1956)

The family lived at Priory House, Boxted, Essex.

== Politics ==
He inherited the peerage on his father's death in 1959, the day after his thirty-fifth birthday. However, he did not make his maiden speech until 1965, some six years later. From this point on, unlike his father, who had not spoken in the almost twenty years he held a peerage, Ironside took an increasingly active part in the House of Lords. During the 1970s and 1980s, he was a member of the European Community Select Committee, the Parliamentary and Scientific Committee, the All-Party Energy Studies Group, and, in the 1990s, the All-Party Defence Study Group. His contributions were mainly focused on scientific issues, though in later years he took an increased interest in defence procurement.

Under the House of Lords Act 1999, all but ninety-two hereditary peers lost their right to sit in the Lords. These ninety-two were selected by ballot, both from the whole House and by party groups; in the election of Conservative peers, Ironside received fifty-six votes, ranking him sixty-eighth out of 113 candidates. As only forty-two Conservatives were selected, Ironside ceased to have a seat in the Lords, and he declined to participate in any subsequent by-election to the Lords.

== Arms ==
Coat of arms of Edmund Ironside, 2nd Baron Ironside
Crest A dexter hand gauntletted grasping a sword paleways Argent hilted and pommelled Or. Escutcheon Per bend Sable and Gules on a bend Argent a bendlet wavy Azure in sinister chief a garb Or and in base a lion salient Or and in fess a dexter gauntletted hand grasping a sword paleways Argent hilted Or. Supporters Two bull terriers Proper. Motto Fear Not Hold Fast

== Notes ==
Peerage of the United Kingdom
Preceded by Edmund Ironside	Baron Ironside; 1959–2020	Succeeded by Charles Ironside
