= Gilbert Ironside the elder =

Bishop of Bristol

The Right Reverend Gilbert Ironside
- Bishop of Bristol
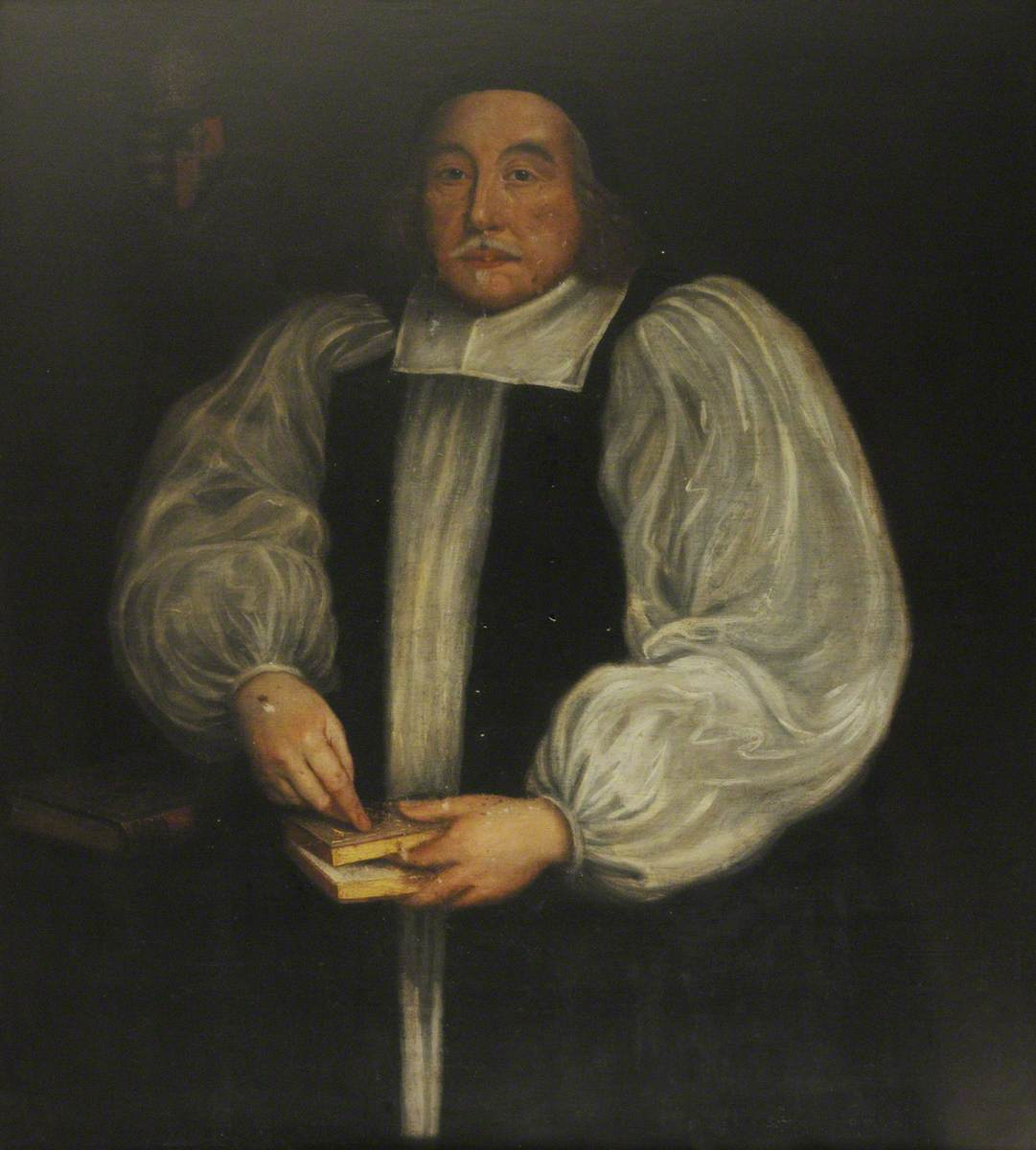
- Diocese: Diocese of Bristol
- In office: 1660–1671
- Predecessor: Thomas Howell (vacant since 1646)
- Successor: Guy Carleton

Orders
- Consecration: 6 January 1661 by Gilbert Sheldon

Personal details
- Born: 25 November 1588 Hawkesbury, Gloucestershire
- Died: 19 September 1671 (aged 82)
- Buried: Bristol Cathedral
- Denomination: Anglican
- Spouse: (1) Elizabeth Frenchman (2) Alice Glisson
- Education: Trinity College, Oxford

Gilbert Ironside the elder (1588–1671) was Bishop of Bristol.

== Life ==
He was elder son of Ralph Ironside, rector of Long Bredy and of Winterbourne Abbas and was born at Hawkesbury, near Sodbury, Gloucestershire, on 25 November 1588. The second son, Ralph Ironside (1590–1683) became rector of Long Bredy in succession to his father, who died in 1629, and was also Archdeacon of Dorset.

Gilbert Ironside matriculated at Trinity College, Oxford, 22 June 1604, and became scholar of his college 28 May 1605, B.A. 1608, M.A. 1612, B.D. 1619, and D.D. 1620, and Fellow of Trinity 1613. In 1618 he was presented to the rectory of Winterbourne Steepleton, Dorset, by Sir Robert Miller. In 1629 he succeeded his father in the benefice of Winterbourne Abbas. He was also rector of Yeovilton in Somerset. Anthony à Wood says that he kept his preferments during the protectorate, but this is doubtful.

Either by marriage or other means he amassed a large fortune before the Restoration. On 13 October 1660 he was appointed to a prebendal stall in York Minster, but resigned the post next year. In 1660/1 he was made Bishop of Bristol — he was elected to the See on 30 November (or 1 December) 1660, confirmed 24 December, and consecrated a bishop on 13 January 1661. As a man of wealth he was considered fitted to maintain the dignity of the episcopate with the reduced revenues of the see.

At Bristol, Ironside showed forbearance to nonconforming ministers. Edmund Calamy gives particulars of a long conference between him and John Westley, grandfather of John Wesley. Ironside died on 19 September 1671, and was buried in his cathedral without any memorial, near the steps of the bishop's throne.

== Works ==
He was the author of Seven Questions of the Sabbath briefly disputed, Oxford, 1637

== Family ==
He married (1) Elizabeth, daughter of Edward Frenchman of East Compton, Dorsetshire, and (2) Alice, daughter of William Glisson of Marnhull, Dorsetshire. By his first wife he was father of four sons, of whom Gilbert Ironside the younger was the third.

== Notes ==
Church of England titles
Preceded by Thomas Howell vacant since 1646	Bishop of Bristol; 1661–1671	Succeeded by Guy Carleton
