= Robert Ironside (businessman) =

Canadian businessman and politician

Robert Ironside, (b. 27 November 1854 – d. October 10, 1910) was a Canadian from Upper Canada whose parents had immigrated from Scotland. His pursuits, beyond businessman, involved cattle breeding and politics.

In 1883, Robert came to Manitou, Manitoba in the employ of John Elliott and Sons, a farm equipment manufacturer. By 1885, he and a partner had opened a lumber and coal business. During the North-West rebellion they supplied beef to the army. Although the partnership ended quickly, he and his partner maintained business connections with both expanding to surrounding communities. Ironside built a large grain warehouse in La Rivière, Manitoba where he competed successfully in the grain business. He also raised, bought and exported beef from the area which coincided with the arrival of access to a railroad.

The cattle business led to a large modern abattoir in Winnipeg and shipping meat in refrigerated railway cars. During this period he represented Manitou in the Legislative Assembly of Manitoba. His departure for Montreal in 1896 to manage the export business brought his promising political career to an end. He continued to reside in Quebec until his death.
