= List of alumni of Fitzwilliam College, Cambridge =

A list of alumni of Fitzwilliam College, Cambridge, one of the constituent colleges of the University of Cambridge in England. Its alumni include politicians, members of the judiciary, academics, industrialists, artists, athletes and journalists. This list also includes non-collegiate students affiliated to Cambridge University, known as students of Fitzwilliam House, prior to the granting of collegiate status in 1966.

The college has educated six winners of the Nobel Prize: Angus Deaton (2015, in Economics), Joseph Stiglitz (2001, in Economics), César Milstein (1981, in Medicine), Ernst Boris Chain (1945, in Medicine), Albert Szent-Györgyi (1937, in Medicine), Charles Sherrington (1932, in Medicine).

== Heads of state or government, or royal consorts ==
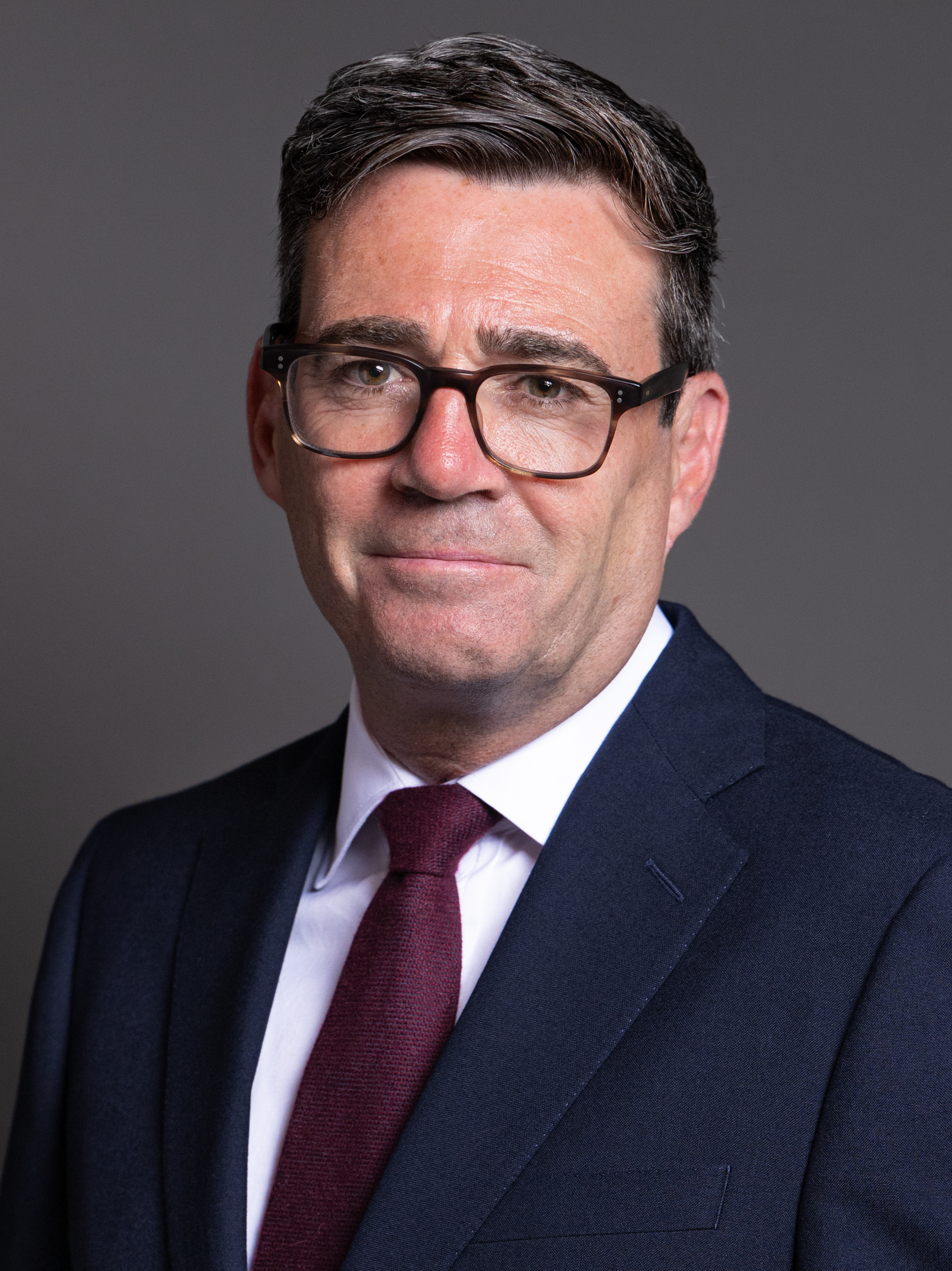
Andy Burnham

- Andy Burnham, Labour Party leader, UK prime minister and former mayor of Greater Manchester
- Queen Sofía of Spain – queen consort of Spain as wife of Juan Carlos I
- Shankar Dayal Sharma – ninth President of India
- Lee Kuan Yew – first prime minister of Singapore
- Subhas Chandra Bose – Indian nationalist and Head of the State and Prime Minister of the Provisional Government of Free India (1943-5)

== Politicians and civil servants ==
- Augustus Molade Akiwumi – judge and the second Speaker of the Parliament of Ghana
- Joseph Baptista – Indian politician and Mayor of Bombay
- Robert Battersby – Conservative MEP for Humberside (1979–89)
- Denys Bullard – Conservative politician
- Judith Bunting – Liberal Democrats MEP for South East England
- Sir Dennis Byron – President of the Caribbean Court of Justice
- Sir Vince Cable – Liberal Democrat MP, Secretary of State for Business, Innovation and Skills (2010–15)
- Sachindra Chaudhuri – Indian politician and Minister of Finance (1965-7)
- Tanmanjeet Singh Dhesi – Labour MP
- Dame Cressida Dick – police officer, Commissioner of Police of the Metropolis in London
- Timothy Duke – officer of arms at the College of Arms in London
- Sir Kenneth Eaton – Royal Navy officer serving as Controller of the Navy (1989–94)
- Mike Gapes – Labour MP
- Bernard Georges – member of the National Assembly of the Seychelles
- John Glen – Conservative MP, serving as Economic Secretary to the Treasury and City Minister
- Tim Godwin – Deputy Commissioner of Police of the Metropolis in London
- Julia Goldsworthy – Liberal Democrat MP
- Geoff Gollop – Conservative politician, Lord Mayor of Bristol
- J. E. Casely Hayford – Ghanaian politician
- Heng Chee How – Singaporean politician

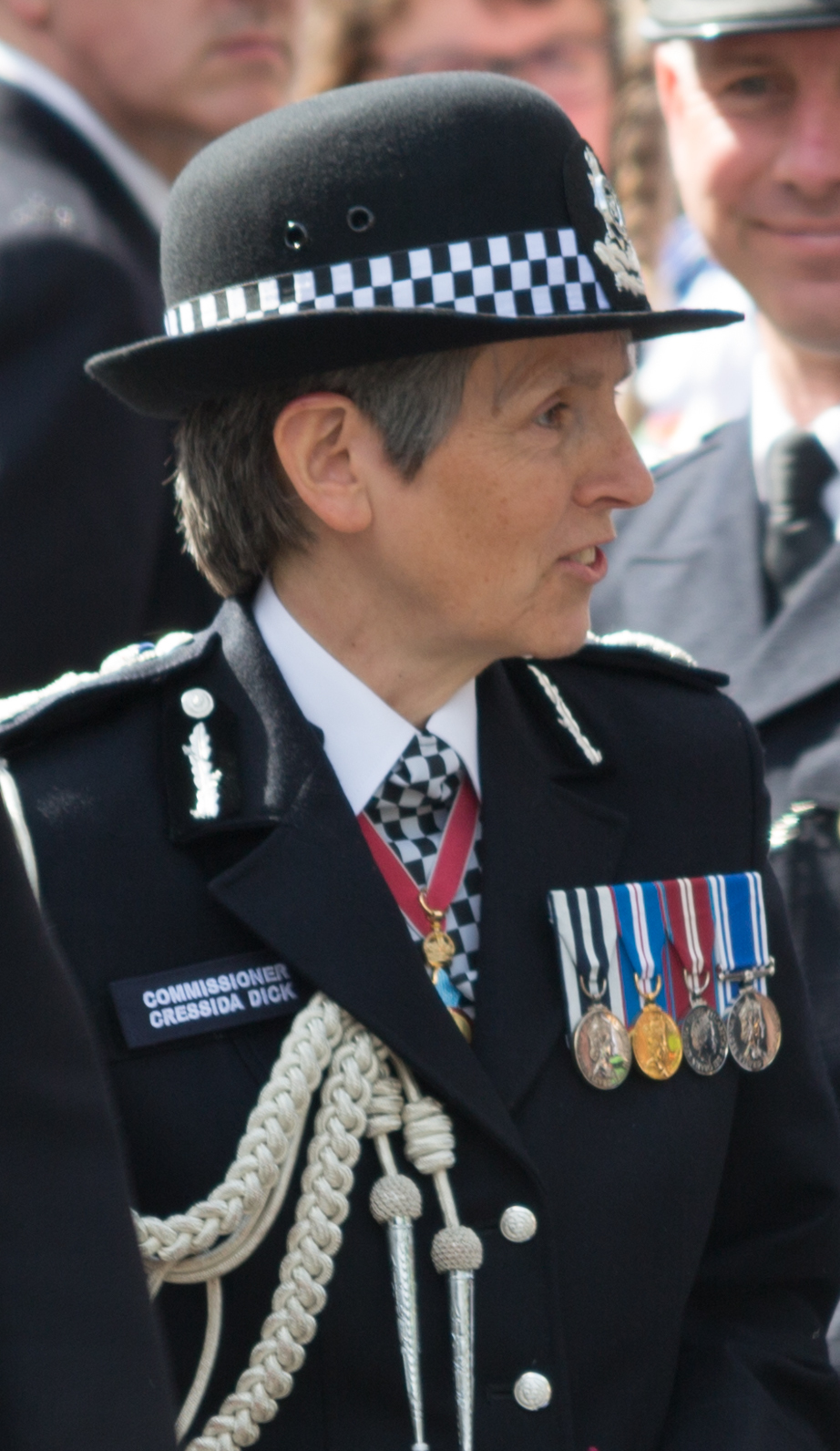
Cressida Dick

- Bernard Hogan-Howe – Commissioner of the Met (2011–17)
- Sara Ibrahim – barrister and Labour activist
- Dave Johnston – police officer
- Alicia Kearns – Conservative MP for Rutland and Melton
- Jim Knight – Labour MP
- Bashiru Kwaw-Swanzy – Attorney General of Ghana (1962–66)
- Norman Lamont – Conservative MP, Chancellor of the Exchequer
- David Leakey – general, Director of the European Union Military Staff
- Adrian Leppard – Commissioner of City of London Police
- Babar W. Malik – Pakistani diplomat
- Sir William Manning – colonial administrator
- David Martin – Conservative MP for Portsmouth South (1987-1997)
- Sir Jon Murphy – police officer
- Chris O'Connor – British diplomat, ambassador to Tunisia (2008–13)
- Declan O'Loan – SDLP politician
- Brian Paddick – Liberal Democrats politician and peer
- G. G. Ponnambalam – Sri Lankan politician and founder of the All Ceylon Tamil Congress
- Sir David Reddaway – British High Commissioner to Canada, British Ambassador to Ireland, British Ambassador to Turkey
- Paikiasothy Saravanamuttu – Sri Lankan civil servant
- Gilbert Granville Sharp – liberal politician and barrister
- Samir Shihabi – President of the United Nations General Assembly (1991-2)
- Mike Snelling – test pilot
- Norman St John-Stevas – Conservative politician and Leader of the House of Commons (1979–81)
- David Wilshire – Conservative politician

== Lawyers and judges ==
- Nasir Aslam Zahid – Chief Justice of the Supreme Court of Pakistan
- Dame Sarah Asplin – Court of Appeal Judge
- Anthony Gates – Chief Justice of Fiji
- David Kitchin – Justice of the Supreme Court of the United Kingdom
- Andrew Li – Chief Justice of the Court of Final Appeal, Hong Kong
- Sir Duncan Ouseley – High Court Judge
- Dean Spielmann – President of the European Court of Human Rights (2013-5)
- John Turner – lawyer and recorder player
- Marina Wheeler – barrister and a spouse of Boris Johnson

== Academics ==
=== Science ===
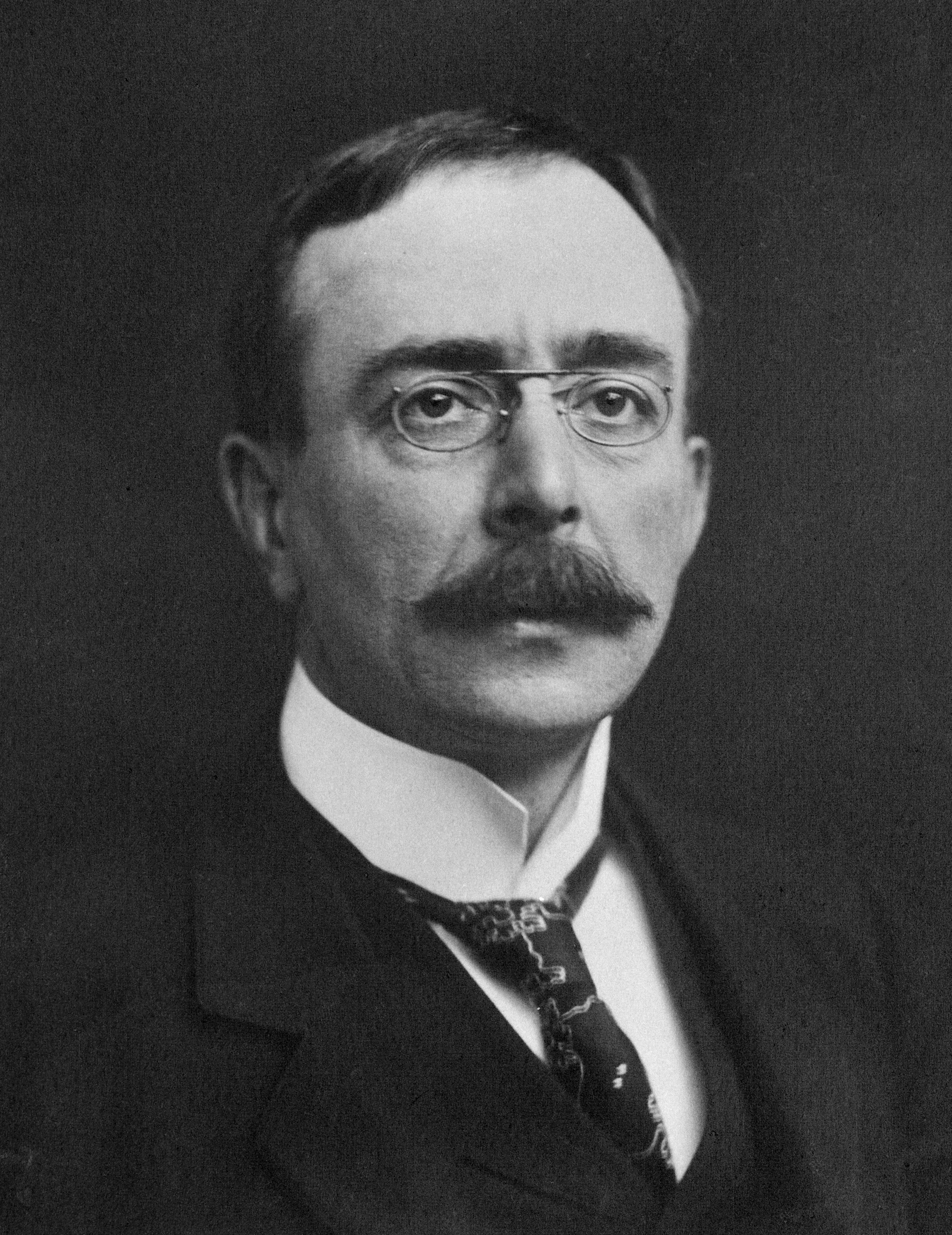
Charles Sherrington

- Sir Shankar Balasubramanian – chemist and Herchel Smith Professor of Medicinal Chemistry
- David Cardwell – engineer and head of the Department of Engineering, University of Cambridge
- Min Chueh Chang – reproductive biologist, co-developer of the birth control pill
- Sir Ernst Chain – biochemist and Nobel Prize winner
- Henry Gee – palaeontologist and evolutionary biologist
- David Glover (geneticist) - geneticist
- David Lagourie Gosling – nuclear physicist
- Vasant Gowarikar – physicist and scientific adviser to the Prime Minister of India (1991-3)
- Albert Szent-Györgyi – biochemist and Nobel Prize winner
- C. E. M. Hansel – psychologist
- Andy Harter – computer scientist
- Christopher John Lamb – plant biologist
- Harry Leitch – biologist
- Anthony Michell – engineer
- César Milstein – biochemist and Nobel Prize winner
- Jayant Narlikar – astrophysicist
- Mark Pallen – microbiologist
- Adam Scaife – physicist
- Sir Charles Scott Sherrington – neurologist and Nobel Prize winner
- M. S. Swaminathan – geneticist, winner of the first World Food Prize
- James Ward – psychologist and philosopher, President of the Aristotelian Society (1919–20)

=== Mathematics ===
- Arran Fernandez – mathematician and Senior Wrangler
- Richard Rado – mathematician

=== Social Sciences ===
- Nicholas Bloom – economist
- Sir Angus Deaton – economist and Nobel Prize winner (2015)
- Geoff Dench – sociologist
- Carlene Firmin – sociologist
- Hal Lister – geographer
- John Moore – economist
- Norman Pounds – geographer and historian
- Sigbert Prais – economist
- Rogelio Ramírez de la O – econonomist
- Gordon Redding – economist
- T. Somasekaram – geographer
- Joseph Stiglitz – economist and Nobel Prize winner

=== Humanities ===
- Paul Mellars – archaeologist
- Bernard Orchard – biblical scholar
- John Pickstone – historian of science
- Derek Pringle – literary critic
- M Harunur Rashid – literary critic and scholar of Sufism
- Sir J. Eric S. Thompson – translator of Mayan hieroglyphs
- Charles Feinstein – historian
- John Hedley Brooke – historian of science
- Catherine Barnard – legal scholar
- David W. Bebbington – historian
- Maurice Bloch – anthropologist

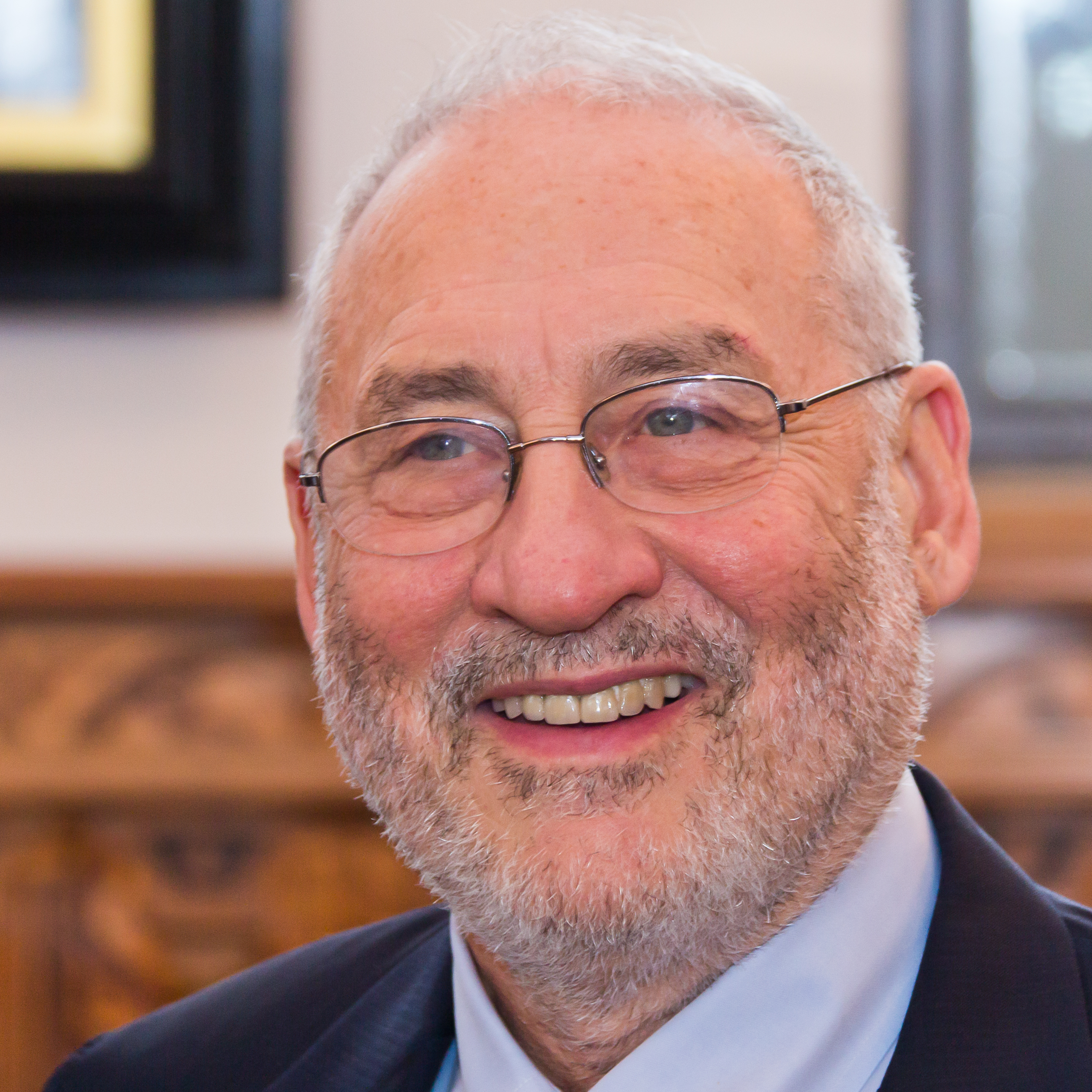
Joseph Stiglitz

- Louis Blom-Cooper – lawyer and legal scholar
- John Ingamells – art historian, director of the Wallace Collection
- Rhodri Jeffreys-Jones – historian
- Sebastian Kim – theologian
- Casimir Lewy – philosopher
- John M. Hull – theologist
- E. J. Lowe – philosopher
- I. Howard Marshall – New Testament scholar
- Moez Masoud – scholar of Islam
- David Starkey – historian and broadcaster

== Clergy ==
- John Alford – Archdeacon of Halifax (1972–84)
- John Allen – Provost of Wakefield (1982–97)
- Mark Ashcroft – Bishop of Bolton (2016-)

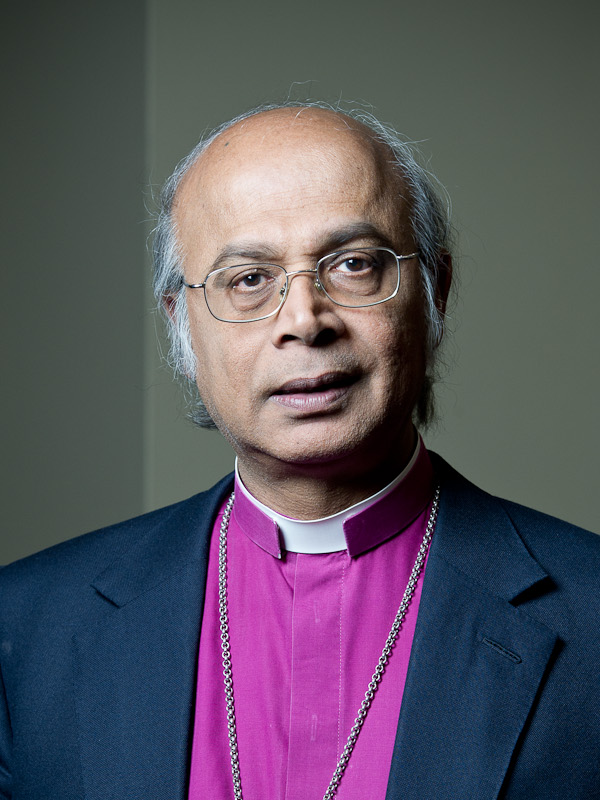
Michael Nazir-Ali

- Donald Baker – Bishop of Bendigo (1920–38)
- John C. A. Barrett – Methodist minister
- James Harvey Bloom – clergyman and antiquarian
- Frederick Bolton – Dean of Leighlin (1963–83)
- Leonard Cornwell – Archdeacon of Swindon (1947–63)
- John Cox – Archdeacon of Sudbury (1995-2006)
- Richard Fenwick – Bishop of St Helena (2011–18)
- Robert Freeman – Bishop of Penrith
- Richard Frith – Bishop of Hereford
- David Garnett – Archdeacon of Chesterfield (1996-2009)
- John Gathercole – Archdeacon of Dudley (1987-2001)
- David Goldie – Archdeacon of Buckingham (1998-2002)
- Leslie Griffiths – Methodist minister and life peer
- Frederick Hazell – Archdeacon of Croydon (1978–93)
- Simon Heathfield – Archdeacon of Aston (2014-)
- Vanessa Herrick – Archdeacon of Harlow
- Mike Hill – Bishop of Bristol (2003–17)
- Judy Hunt – Archdeacon of Suffolk (2009–12)
- Clifford Jarvis – clergyman
- Michael Langrish – Bishop of Exeter (2000–13)
- John Lawton – Archdeacon of Warrington (1970–81)
- Jane Leach – Methodist minister
- David Lee – Archdeacon of Bradford (2004–15)
- Norman Lesser – Archbishop of New Zealand (1961–71)
- Richard Lewis – Dean of Wells (1990-2003)
- Richard Llewellin – Anglican clergyman
- Clifford Martin – Bishop of Liverpool (1944–65)
- Gordon McPhate – Dean of Chester
- Michael Middleton – Archdeacon of Swindon (1992-7)
- Arthur Morris – Anglican bishop
- Michael Nazir-Ali – Bishop of Rochester (1994-2009), Prelate of Honour of His Holiness
- Peter Nott – Bishop of Norwich (1985–99)
- Catherine Ogle – Dean of Winchester (2017-)
- William Purcell – Archdeacon of Dorking (1968–82)
- Alwyn Rice Jones – Archbishop of Wales (1991-9)
- Harold Richards – priest
- Peter Sertin – Anglican cleric
- Brian Smith – Bishop of Edinburgh (2001–11)

== Business ==
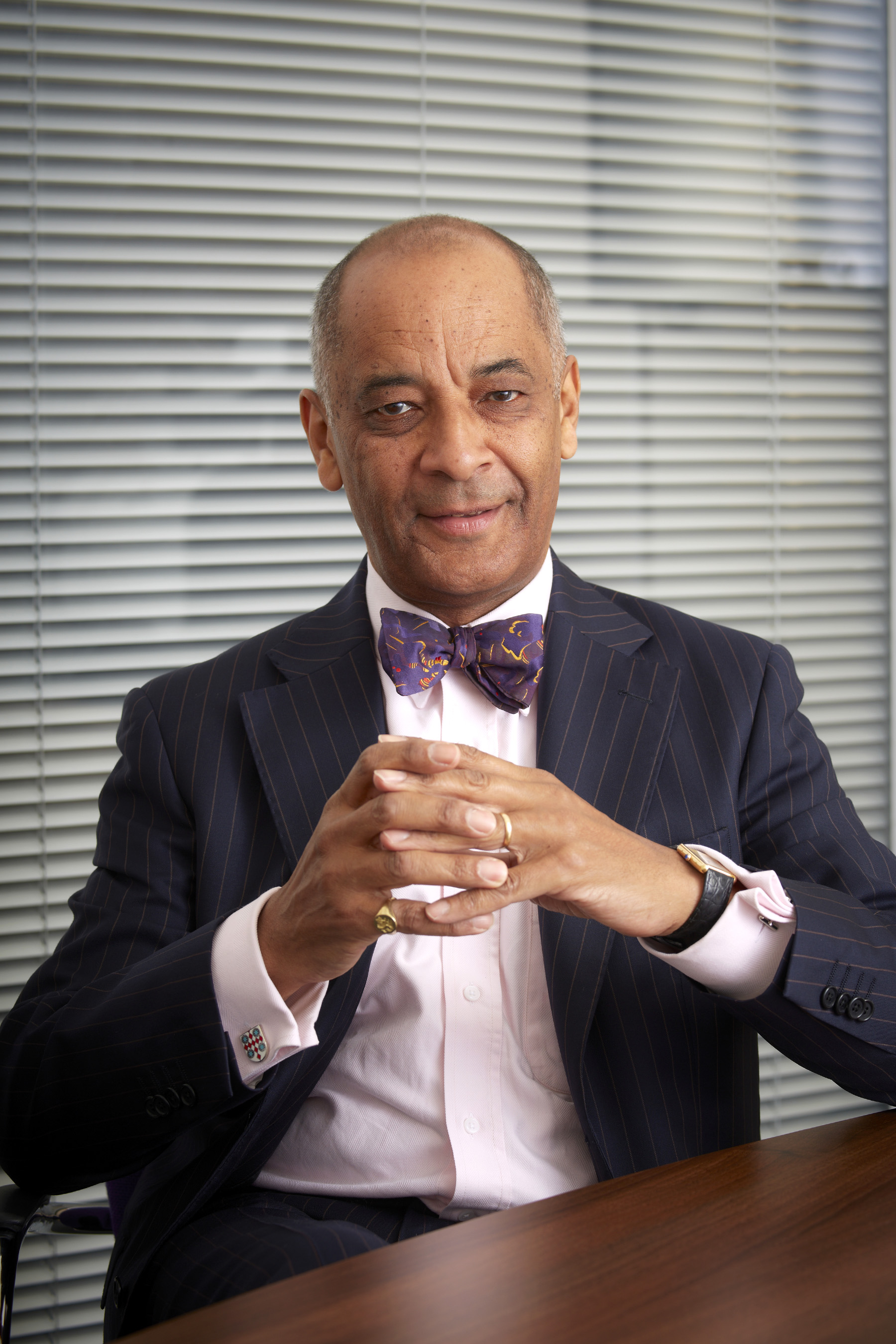
Ken Olisa

- Sonita Alleyne – co-founder and CEO of Somethin’ Else (media content agency) and Master of Jesus College, Cambridge
- Simon Arora – CEO of retail chain B&M
- Peter Cowley – entrepreneur, angel investor, author
- Dinesh Dhamija – founder of Orbitz travel metasearch engine and Liberal Democrat MEP
- Dermot Gleeson – executive chairman of M J Gleeson and member of the Board of Governors of the BBC
- Graham Love – businessman and CEO of Qinetiq
- Helena Morrissey – financier
- Sir Ken Olisa – businessman and Lord-Lieutenant of Greater London
- Christian Purslow – businessman, CEO of Aston Villa F.C.
- Dame Sharon White – chair of the John Lewis Partnership

== Artists, writers and musicians ==
- David Atherton – conductor
- Catherine Banner – novelist
- Pat Chapman – food writer
- James Charlton – poet
- Walford Davies – composer
- Christopher de Bellaigue – journalist in the Middle East
- Nick Drake – singer
- Simon H. Fell – bassist and composer
- Giles Foden – author of The Last King of Scotland
- Maurizio Giuliano – traveller and author
- Catherine Grosvenor – playwright
- Lee Hall – playwright
- Charlotte Hudson – actress
- Shiv K. Kumar – poet and novelist
- Bem Le Hunte – novelist
- Joseph McManners – singer
- John Noble – baritone
- James Norton – actor
- Lawrence Osborne – novelist
- Martin Outram – violist
- Francis Scarfe – poet

== Media ==
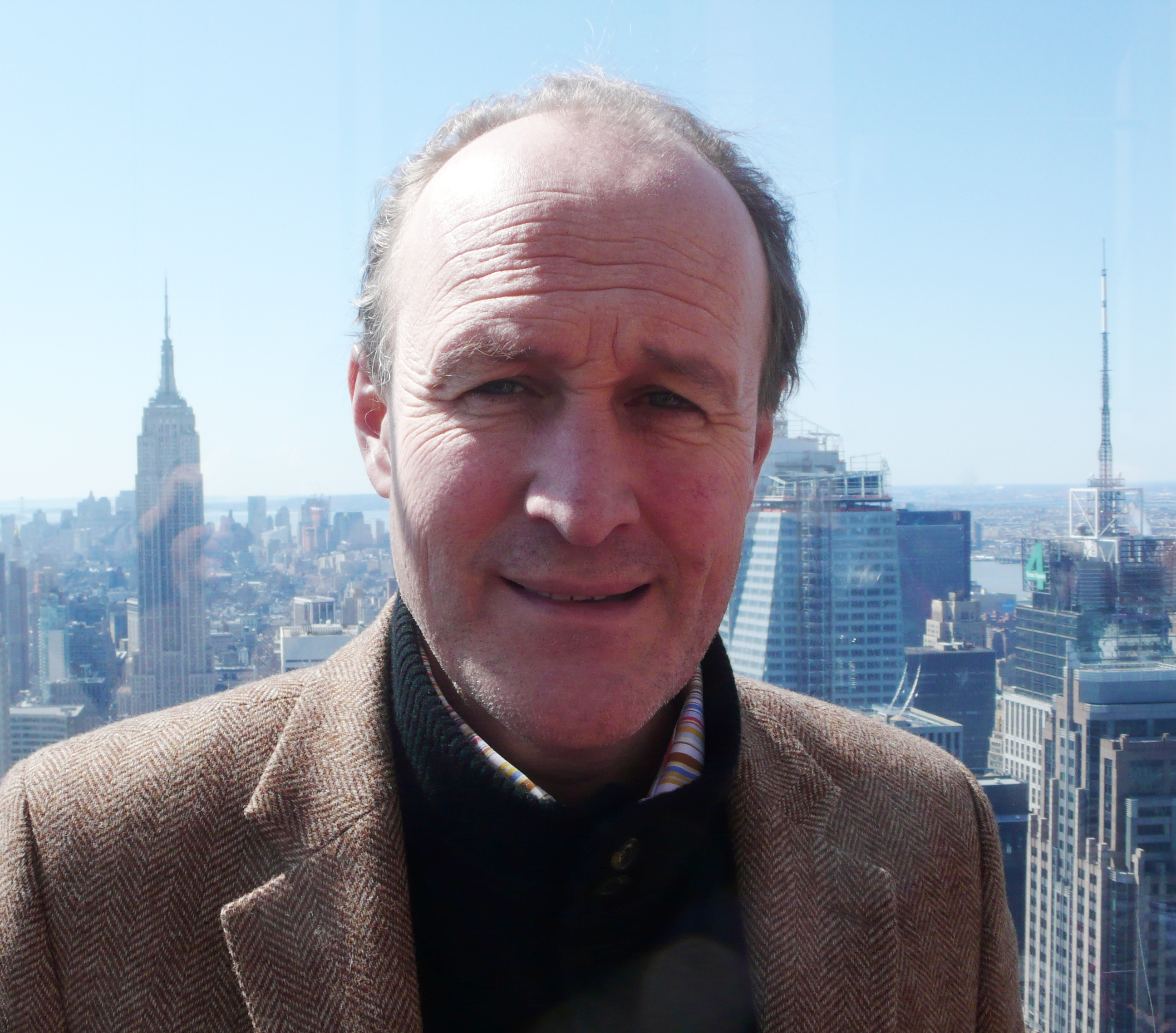
Peter Bazalgette

- Sir Peter Bazalgette – television executive
- Sir Humphrey Burton – music broadcaster
- Nick Clarke – radio host
- Tony Cornell – parapsychologist and TV personality
- Trevor Dann – writer and broadcaster
- Brian Dooley – TV writer
- Larry Elliott – journalist and economics editor at The Guardian
- Robin Ellis – actor
- Paul Henley – TV and radio journalist
- Ciaran Jenkins – reporter with Channel 4
- Ashley John-Baptiste – BBC broadcaster and presenter
- Nick Kochan – financial journalist
- Christopher Martin-Jenkins – cricket journalist
- Ahmed Rashid – journalist and author
- Beth Rigby – political editor of Sky News
- Dan Roan – Sports Editor for BBC News
- Tim Sullivan – Film and television director
- Ted Young – editor of Metro newspaper

== Sportspeople ==
- Eddie Butler – rugby player and sports commentator
- Raymond Calverley – canoeist
- Bernie Cotton – field hockey player
- Phil Edmonds – cricketer
- Alastair Hignell – rugby player, cricketer and sports commentator
- Michael Hutchinson – Northern Irish cyclist
- Tony Jorden – rugby player and cricketer
- Ed Kalman – rugby player
- Peter Mather – fencer
- Jamie McDowall – cricketer
- Fiona McIntosh – fencer
- Greg Nance – mountaineer and businessman
- Sir Daniel Pettit – footballer and industrialist
- Derek Pringle – cricketer
- Martin Purdy – rugby player
- Chris Saunders – cricketer and educator
- Paul Svehlik - Olympic hockey player
- Martin Winbolt-Lewis - Olympian
