= Christine Froude =

British Anglican priest

The Venerable Christine Froude
- Archdeacon of Malmesbury
- Church: Church of England
- Diocese: Diocese of Bristol
- In office: 2011–2018
- Predecessor: Alan Hawker
- Successor: Christopher Bryan
- Other post: Acting Archdeacon of Bristol (2013–2018)

Orders
- Ordination: 1995 (deacon); 1996 (priest)

Personal details
- Born: 6 June 1947 (age 78)
- Denomination: Anglicanism
- Spouse: David Froude (m. 1972)
- Children: Two

Christine Ann Froude (born 6 June 1947) is a British retired Anglican priest. She was Archdeacon of Malmesbury from 2011 and Acting Archdeacon of Bristol, 2013–2018.

== Early life and education ==
Froude was born on 6 June 1947 to Winifred Woolcock and Frederick Woolcock. She became an Associate of the Chartered Institute of Bankers (ACIB) in 1973. Before ordination, she worked for Midland Bank in a number of positions. From 1992 to 1995, she trained for ordination on the Southern Dioceses' Ministerial Training Scheme.

== Ordained ministry ==
Froude was ordained in the Church of England as a deacon in 1995 and as a priest in 1996. She has spent all her ministry in the Diocese of Bristol. She served her curacy as a non-stipendiary minister of the Church of St Mary Magdalene, Stoke Bishop, Bristol between 1995 and 1999.

She was Chaplain of the University Hospitals Bristol NHS Foundation Trust from 1999 to 2001; Dean of Women's Ministry for the Diocese of Bristol from 2000 to 2011; Priest in charge of St Mary, Shirehampton from 2001 to 2011; and an Honorary Canon of Bristol Cathedral from 2001 to 2011.

In December 2010, it was announced that she would be the next Archdeacon of Malmesbury. She was collated and installed as archdeacon during a service at Bristol Cathedral on 21 April 2011. In January 2012, she also became a director of the Church Pastoral Aid Society. From December 2012 until June 2018, she was the acting Archdeacon of Bristol in addition to being the Archdeacon of Malmesbury: this made her the only archdeacon then serving in the Diocese of Bristol.

=== Views ===
Froude belongs to the Evangelical Anglican tradition of the Church of England. She supports the ordination of women as priests and bishops.

== Personal life ==
In 1972, the then Christine Woolcock married David Froude. Together they have two children: one son and one daughter.
