= Percy Reddick =

British archdeacon

Percy George Reddick (9 November 1896 – 17 March 1978) was Archdeacon of Bristol from 1950 to 1967.

Reddick served with the King's Royal Rifles during World War I. He was at Oxford University from 1919 to 1923: three years at St Edmund Hall and one at Wycliffe Hall. After curacies in Southfields and Sydenham he held incumbencies, Herne Hill and Downend. He was Bristol Diocesan Secretary from 1943 until his Archdeacon’s appointment.

Church of England titles
Preceded by Ivor Stanley Watkins	Archdeacon of Bristol; 1950–1967	Succeeded by Leslie Arthur Williams
