= James Tetley =

James George Tetley (6 July 1843 – 10 March 1924) was an Anglican priest and author

Tetley was born in Torquay, educated at Magdalen College, Oxford, and ordained in 1868. After curacies in Caldicot, Badminton and Henley-on-Thames he was Vicar of Highnam from 1876 to 1892. He was Proctor in Convocation for the Chapter of Bristol and a Canon Residentiary at its cathedral from then until 1910 when he became Archdeacon of Bristol, a post he held until 1921.

Church of England titles
Preceded by Ravenscroft Stewart	Archdeacon of Bristol; 1910–1921	Succeeded by Charles Henry Dickinson
