= Authoritarian capitalism =

Economic system in which a market economy exists alongside an authoritarian government

Authoritarian capitalism, or illiberal capitalism, is an economic system in which a liberal capitalist market economy exists alongside an authoritarian government. It overlaps significantly with state capitalism, a system in which the state undertakes commercial activities. However, it is distinct in its combination of private property and the functioning of market forces with restrictions on dissent, a complete lack of freedom of speech or significant limits on it, and either an electoral system with a single dominant political party or a lack of elections.

Countries commonly referred to as being authoritarian capitalist states include China since the reform and opening up; Russia, under Vladimir Putin; Chile, under Augusto Pinochet; Indonesia, under Suharto; Peru under Alberto Fujimori and Singapore, under Lee Kuan Yew. Additionally, the term is often applied to military dictatorships that received support from the United States during the Cold War era.

Political scientists disagree on the long-run sustainability of authoritarian capitalism, with arguments both for and against the long-term viability of political repression alongside a capitalist free-market economic system.

== History ==
=== Early development ===
As a political economic model, authoritarian capitalism is not a recent phenomenon. Throughout history, examples of authoritarian capitalism include Manuel Estrada Cabrera's and Jorge Ubico's respective reigns in Guatemala, Augusto Pinochet's reign in Chile, Suharto's New Order in Indonesia and the People's Action Party's early administration in Singapore. During World War I, the ideological divide between authoritarian and liberal regimes was significantly less pronounced as both were aligned to capitalist economic models. Moreover, the Axis powers of World War II have been described as possessing totalitarian capitalist economic systems, acting as examples of the early developments of authoritarian capitalism.

From the end of World War II, various authoritarian capitalism regimes emerged, developed and transitioned into a liberal capitalist model through East Asia, Southern Europe and Latin America. It has been argued that the change of these early regimes was predominately due to the dominance of liberal capitalist countries such as the United States as opposed to a natural transition, suggesting that modern authoritarian capitalist regimes may further develop the system.

=== Recent prominence ===
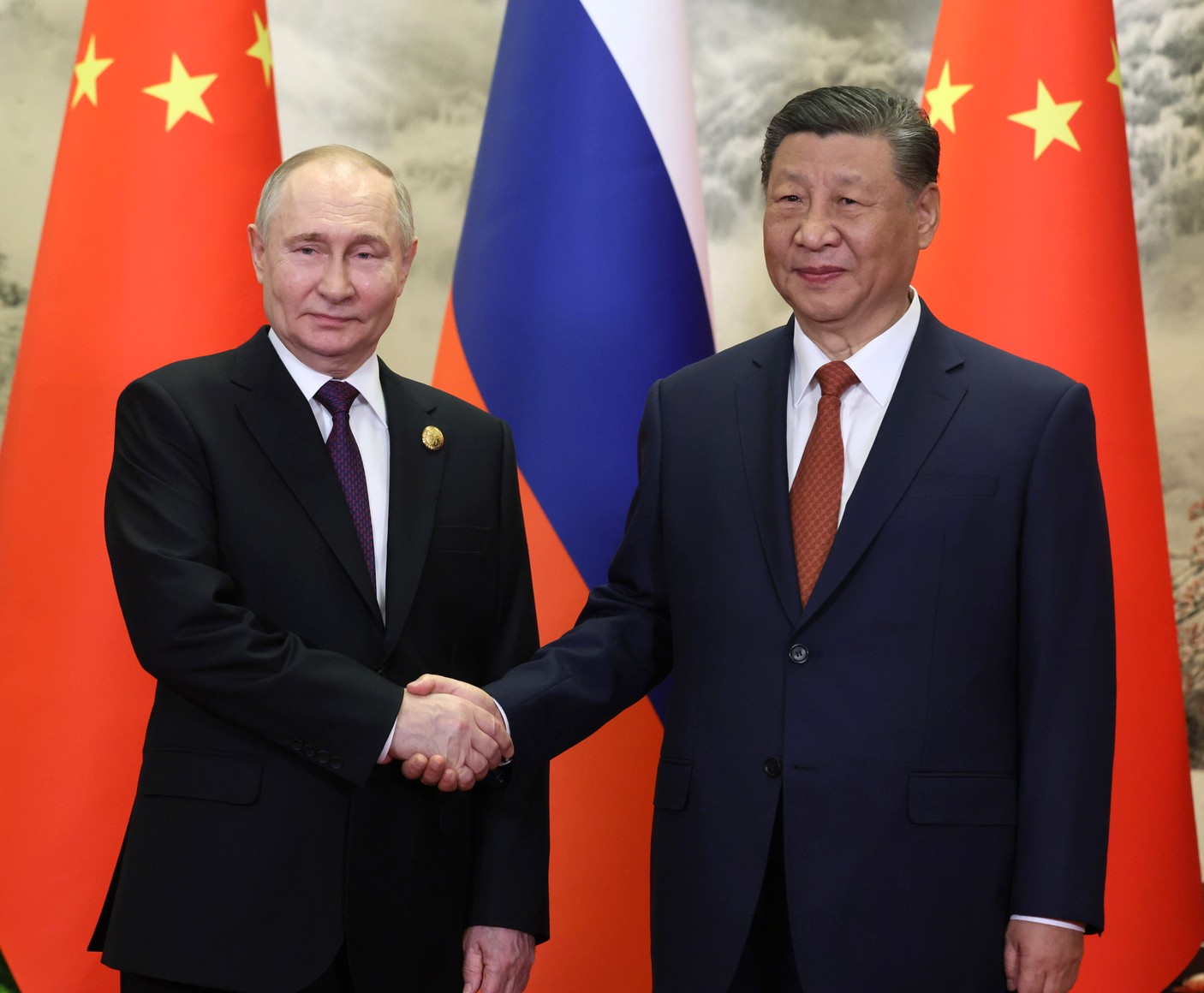
China's Xi Jinping and Russia's Vladimir Putin, both prominent recent figures for authoritarian capitalism

While having been a relatively unknown system due to the failure of authoritarianism within the First World during the Cold War, with the transition of authoritarian countries such as China and Russia to capitalist economic models, authoritarian capitalism has recently risen to prominence. While it was initially thought that changing to a capitalist model would lead to the formation of a liberal democracy within authoritarian countries, the continued persistence of an authoritarian capitalist models has led to this view decreasing in popularity. Furthermore, some have argued that by using capitalist economic models authoritarian governments have improved the stability of their regimes through improving the quality of life of their citizenship. Highlighting this appeal, Robert Kagan stated: "There's no question that China is an attractive model for autocrats who would like to be able to pursue economic growth without losing control of the levers of power".

Moreover, authoritarian capitalist regimes have experienced notable growth in their economic production, with the International Monetary Fund stating that authoritarian capitalist countries experienced an average 6.28% GDP growth rate compared to the 2.62% of liberal capitalist countries. In addition, many have argued the inability of liberal capitalism, with the 2008 financial crisis and the slow response of the United States government, to quickly respond to crisis compared to more authoritarian systems has been bought into prominence. In fact, many argue that authoritarian capitalism and liberal capitalism have or will compete on the global stage.

According to political economist Radhika Desai, a Marxist scholar, certain factions of the capitalist class in the West, especially those who support the politics of Donald Trump in the US and Boris Johnson in the UK, favor a more authoritarian capitalism, often embracing protectionism, xenophobia, racism and misogyny as being complementary to economic neoliberalism.

== State capitalism ==
Within countries that practice authoritarian capitalism, state capitalism is generally also present to some extent and vice versa. As such, there is a widespread confusion between the terms with them at times being treated as synonymous by individuals such as former Australian Prime Minister Kevin Rudd.

=== Overlap ===
Authoritarian governments often seek to establish control within their borders and, as such, will use state-owned corporations; therefore, state capitalism will emerge to some extent within countries that practice authoritarian capitalism, manifesting from the ruling authority's desire to exercise control. The prominent use of state-owned corporations and sovereign wealth funds within authoritarian capitalist regimes demonstrates such a tendency, with Russia decreasing its private ownership of oil from 90% to 50% while transitioning to a more authoritarian model under the leadership of Vladimir Putin.

It has also been noted by individuals such as Richard W. Carney that authoritarian regimes have a strong tendency to use their economies to increase their influence, heavily investing in their economies through state-owned enterprises. Carney describes the intervention of authoritarian states occurring through means he describes as extra-shareholder tactics, including regulations, government contracts, and protectionist policies alongside the state engaging in shareholder activism. Moreover, he focuses on the use of state-owned funds to engage in takeovers of key assets in other countries, such as Khazanah Nasional's takeover of Parkway Pantai in 2010.

=== Differences ===
There remains a fundamental difference with state capitalism being a system in which government owned entities engage in for-profit activities while authoritarian capitalism is a system where an authoritarian regime co-exists with, or at least attempts to adopt aspects of, a market economy, highlighted in countries such as Hungary by the Transnational Institute.

== Examples ==
=== China ===
It is generally agreed that China is an authoritarian regime, with the Fraser Institute ranking them 136th for personal freedom and the Human Right Watch's 2018 report describing a "broad and sustained offensive on human rights" within China due to the treatment of activists, restrictions to freedom of information, political expression, religious freedom and minority rights as their core reasons. Michael Witt argues that China broadly displays capitalist traits with a significant number of companies either being private or shared between private and public owners alongside a strong entrepreneurial presence despite a continued predominance of indirect state control.

Reporter Joseph Kurlantzick and political scientist Yuen Yuen Ang state that China is unable to fully use the entrepreneurial elements needed to drive future growth if it maintains authoritarian control. As Ang writes in Foreign Affairs, "[t]o achieve this kind of growth, the government must release and channel the immense creative potential of civil society, which would necessitate greater freedom of expression, more public participation, and less state intervention". As stated by Joseph Kurlantzick, "China's growth 'model' has shown impressive resilience in recent years", with an ability to rapidly respond to crises, confidence around economic success and growing soft power being used to explain it.

=== Russia ===
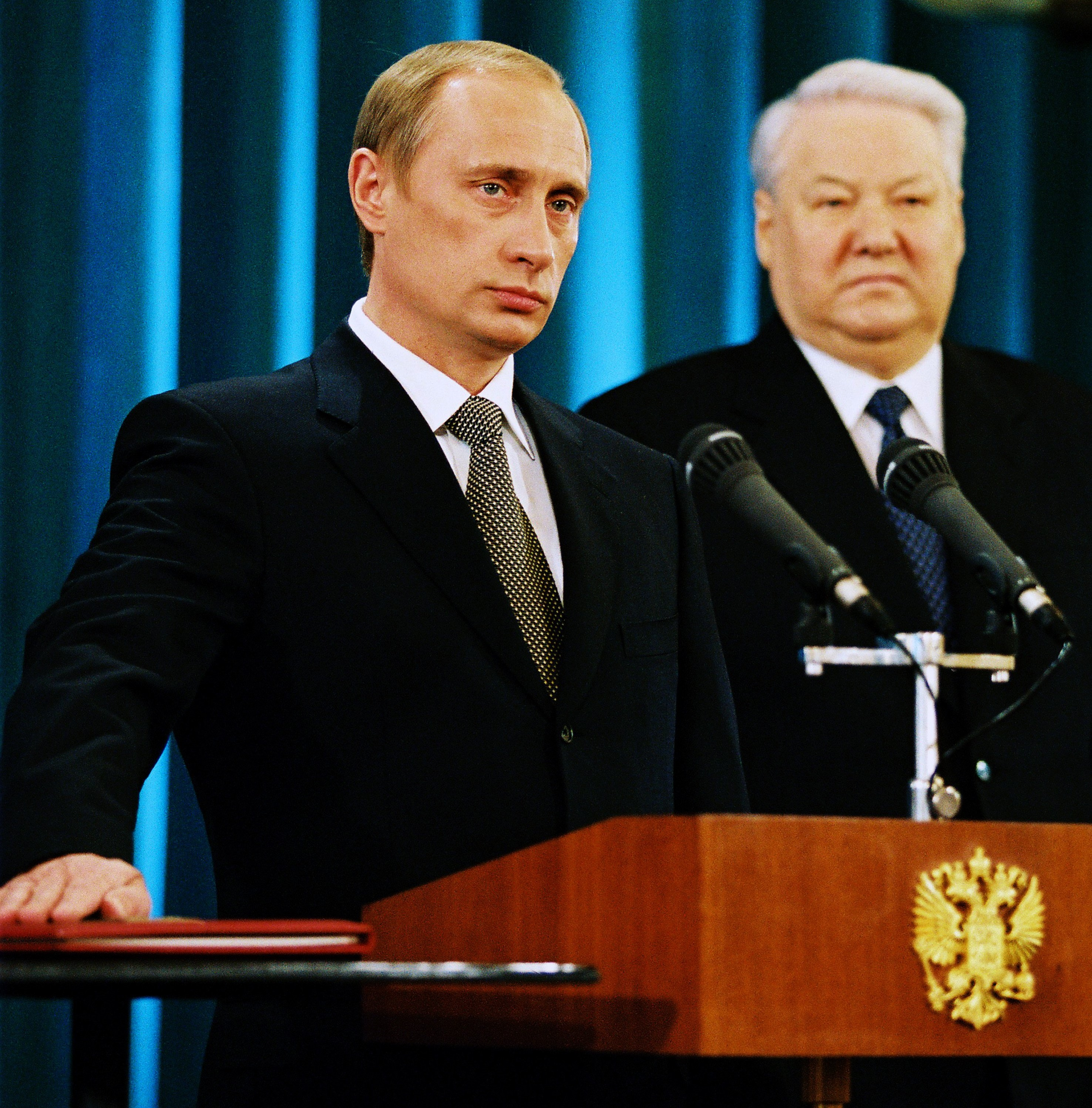
Putin and Boris Yeltsin, both prominent figures of the development of authoritarian capitalism in Russia

Azar Gat describes Russia, along with China, as a prominent example of a modern authoritarian capitalist nation, describing the country as becoming increasingly authoritarian while maintaining a predominately capitalist economic model. Aaron Friedberg simplifies the evolution of the Russian model in the following statement: "The Russian system has also evolved from communist totalitarianism to a form of nationalist authoritarian capitalism that appears for the moment at least to be relatively stable". Friedberg also describes the 1996 presidential election as the point where authoritarian capitalism began forming within Russia, depicting an increasingly powerful majority party backed by media controlled by oligarchies and led by Boris Yeltsin and later Vladimir Putin. From 1999 under Putin, Friedberg describes the Russian regime as solidifying its power through re-obtaining state control of natural resources, obtaining control of media, and limiting dissidence through measures such as restricting non-governmental organization operations.

=== Saudi Arabia ===
Saudi Arabia is considered by Freedom House as an authoritarian country, receiving a civil liberty score of 7/100; this is due to the fact that the Saudi absolute monarchy prevents any political rights, and the government extremely controls freedom of expression and religion. The Saudi economy has been opening the market regularly even though it has nationalized some state-owned companies.

=== Singapore ===
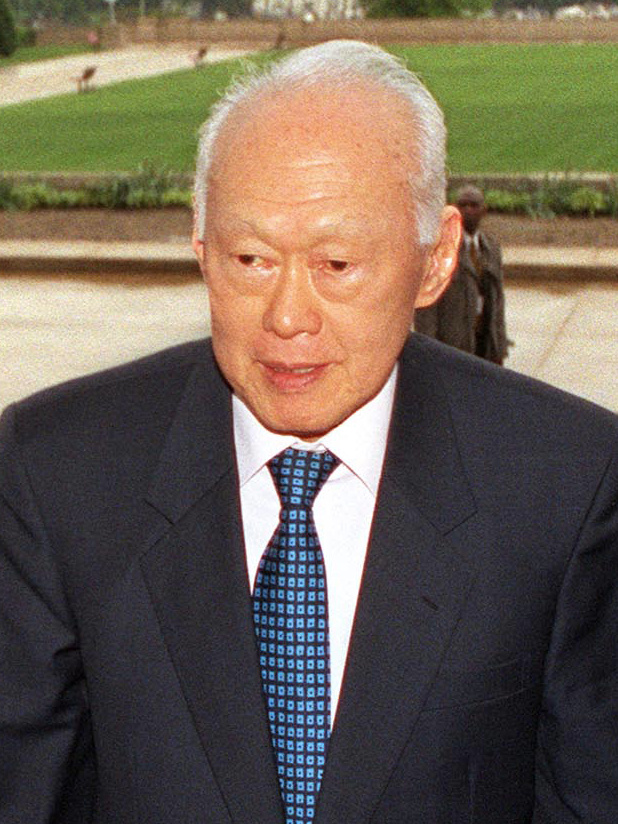
Lee Kuan Yew, a major figure in the development of Singapore's economic model

Singapore is considered by agencies such as the Human Rights Watch as a highly repressive regime. They describe a lack of freedom of speech, capital punishment, detention without trial, and sexual freedom as causing the country to run contrary to international human rights. Moreover, the country under the rule of Lee Kuan Yew has been described as embracing the core aspects of capitalism, with the Fraser Institute ranking it second for economic freedom in 2016, creating a state of authoritarian capitalism. However, there is contention around the continued viability of Singapore's economics success which has increased its GDP per capita from US$427.88 in 1960 to US$57,714.3 in 2017. Some economists argue that Singapore has severely restricted its ability to obtain future growth through the repression of individual freedom of expression and thought. Regardless of this, Singapore is considered as an exception in regards to its stability, with Daniel W. Drezner stating that "with the exception of Singapore, this model has never worked over the long run".

== Contention ==
Authoritarian capitalism is a political-economic model that has faced a variety of criticism. Some experts state that the authoritarian capitalist model is unstable and will eventually transition into that of liberal capitalism, with Daniel W. Drezner stating: "The conventional wisdom in comparative politics is that as societies get richer ... they also start demanding more political accountability." In opposition, others argue that the increased wealth of capitalist regimes allows authoritarian regimes to more adequately utilize technology to assist in maintaining their regimes.

=== Criticism ===
Daniel W. Drezner, writing for Foreign Policy magazine, argues that when societies get richer, their citizens start demanding more political accountability and democracy. Therefore, capitalist economic policies that successfully promote economic growth will be inherently detrimental to the continuation of an authoritarian regime. Individuals will increasingly seek to reduce restrictions upon their human rights as their quality of life and access to communication resources increase, so a successful economy will inevitably lead to citizens revolting against authoritarian governments. An appropriate example of this is the Imperial State of Iran during the reign of the Shah Mohammad Reza Pahlavi which was an authoritarian state capitalist system that enjoyed incredible growth but which nonetheless led to revolution.

Yuen Yuen Ang, writing in Foreign Affairs, argues that the restrictions to freedom of expression found in authoritarian regimes are harmful to the ability of citizens to innovate and engage in entrepreneurship, leading to a reduction in the economic growth of the country. John Lee, Michael Witt and Gordon Redding claim that authoritarian capitalist regimes primarily obtain their legitimacy through their ability to deliver economic growth, and therefore this inherent restriction upon economic growth would eventually lead to the collapse of the regime.

Authoritarian capitalist regimes are viewed as having to face civil disobedience towards their authoritarian characteristics, exhibited by countries such as China experiencing 87,000 instances of mass unrest in 2005. Some critical scholars have argued that "authoritarian capitalism" is a redundancy, as capitalism necessarily involves an authoritarian relationship at the micro-economic level (i.e., in the workplace).

=== Defense ===
John Lee and Brahma Chellaney have argued that authoritarian capitalism is a potential competitor with liberal capitalism, with the recent success of authoritarian capitalist regimes such as China being used as the core of their argument. Chellaney has further stated that through using elements of capitalism, regimes may more effectively employ modern technologies to suppress dissidence towards government such as the Great Firewall used within China. Niv Horesh also argues that authoritarian capitalist model offered by China is a viable alternative to liberal capitalism, with more effective decision-making processes.

In addition, Niv Horesh holds that capitalist free-market policies lead to an increase in authoritarian policies such as those pursued by Margaret Thatcher. The core of this argument lies in the view that citizens will support whichever regime provides material comforts which increasing economic inequality and automation in liberal capitalist nations undermine. Moreover, challenges to liberal capitalism from an inability to adequately cope with advances of technology have also been raised, summarised in the statement by former Australian Prime Minister Kevin Rudd: "Democracies, like corporations, can now be hacked." Alongside these technological challenges, Michael Witt and Gordon Redding have also pointed to a seeming failure to address structural issues such as gerrymandering. Anders Corr has described the expansion of China as a compelling argument for the success of its authoritarian capitalist regime.

Aaron Friedberg of the Sasakawa Peace Foundation has argued that authoritarian capitalist nations have used an exploitation of the Western world, the reshaping of the international order and exclusion of international actors in an attempt to establish their systems of governance. He has also stated that unlike in the Cold War contemporary authoritarian powers are likely to be driven towards cooperation in their attempts to consolidate their regimes.

=== Impact on business ===
In recent years, the Ease of Doing Business index for the authoritarian capitalist states of Hungary and Poland has remained relatively stable, while Singapore continues to lead globally and China has risen sharply. This evidence suggests that authoritarian capitalism can be very business-friendly and attractive for business.

== See also ==
- Authoritarian socialism
- Dark Enlightenment
- Illiberal democracy
- Liberal autocracy
- Neoauthoritarianism (China)
- Right-wing dictatorship
