= Lee Rayfield =

Anglican bishop

The Right Reverend Lee Rayfield
- Bishop of Swindon
- Church: Church of England
- Diocese: Diocese of Bristol
- In office: 2005–2023
- Predecessor: Michael Doe
- Successor: Neil Warwick
- Other post: Acting Bishop of Bristol (2017–2018)

Orders
- Ordination: 1993 (deacon); 1994 (priest) by John Waine
- Consecration: 8 June 2005 by Rowan Williams

Personal details
- Born: 30 September 1955 (age 71)
- Denomination: Anglican
- Spouse: (m. 1978)
- Children: three
- Profession: formerly immunology lecturer
- Education: University of Southampton

Lee Stephen Rayfield (born 30 September 1955) is a retired Anglican bishop who served as Bishop of Swindon.

== Education and medical career ==
Rayfield was educated at the University of Southampton, where he gained a Bachelor of Science (BSc) honours degree in Biology in 1978. He then studied for his Doctor of Philosophy (PhD) degree from St Mary's Hospital Medical School (Paddington, Greater London), being awarded his doctorate in 1981, after which he remained as a post-doctoral researcher until 1984. His final medical post was as a lecturer in immunology at UMDS (Borough & Waterloo, Greater London). As an immunologist, he has contributed to a number of journals and textbooks. A keen amateur runner and cyclist, he has been married since 1978, with three children.

== Ministry ==
In 1991, Rayfield went to Ridley Hall, Cambridge to study for the ministry, after which he was made a deacon at Petertide (4 July) 1993 at Chelmsford Cathedral and ordained a priest the Petertide following (26 June 1994), at Waltham Abbey, both times by John Waine, Bishop of Chelmsford. His ministerial career began with a curacy at Woodford, London (1993–1997) after which he held his only incumbency, as Priest in Charge (1997–2004, and later Vicar, 2004–2005) of St Peter's Furze Platt (Maidenhead, Berkshire). While at Furze Platt, he was additionally a part-time chaplain at St Mark's Hospital, Maidenhead (from 1997), and Area Dean of Maidenhead (from 2000; the deanery changed to Maidenhead and Windsor from 2003). He has also been a member of the Society of Ordained Scientists (SOSc) since 1995, and served on the Gene Therapy Advisory Committee (2000–2009) and on the Human Fertilisation and Embryology Authority since 2012.

He became the Bishop of Swindon, the sole suffragan bishop of the Diocese of Bristol, in 2005: he was ordained and consecrated a bishop on 8 June by Rowan Williams, Archbishop of Canterbury, and installed at Bristol Cathedral on 18 June. Rayfield was Acting Bishop of Bristol after the retirement of Mike Hill in September 2017, until the election of Vivienne Faull in July 2018. On 13 February 2023, he announced his retirement, effective 30 April.

== Styles ==
- Doctor Lee Rayfield (1981–1993)
- The Reverend Doctor Lee Rayfield (1993–2005)
- The Right Reverend Doctor Lee Rayfield (2005–present)

Church of England titles
Preceded by Michael Doe	Bishop of Swindon; 2005–2023	TBA
