= Neil Warwick =

British Anglican bishop

The Right Reverend Neil Warwick
- Bishop of Swindon
- Church: Church of England
- Diocese: Diocese of Bristol
- Predecessor: Lee Rayfield
- Other posts: Acting Bishop of Bristol (September 2025–present)
- Previous post: Archdeacon of Bristol

Orders
- Ordination: 2005 (deacon); 2006 (priest)
- Consecration: 30 November 2023 by Justin Welby

Personal details
- Born: 1964 (age 61–62)
- Denomination: Anglican
- Education: University of Nottingham; Ridley Hall, Cambridge

Neil Michael Warwick (born 1964) is a British Anglican bishop. Since 2023, he has served as Bishop of Swindon, the suffragan bishop of the Church of England's Diocese of Bristol. He was previously Archdeacon of Bristol from September 2019 to 2023.

== Biography ==
Warwick studied geography at the University of Nottingham, graduating with a Bachelor of Arts (BA) degree in 1986. He then worked in the transport industry and in overseas development. During a trip to Zambia in 2000, he felt a call to the priesthood. From 2003 to 2005, he trained for ordained ministry at Ridley Hall, Cambridge.

Warwick was ordained in the Church of England as a deacon in 2005 and as a priest in 2006. After a curacy at Towcester (Northamptonshire) he was the incumbent at Earley (Berkshire) from 2009 until his appointment as archdeacon.

On 24 August 2023, he was announced as the next Bishop of Swindon, a suffragan bishop in the Diocese of Bristol. On 30 November 2023, he was consecrated as a bishop by Justin Welby, the Archbishop of Canterbury, during a service at Canterbury Cathedral.

In the vacancy following the retirement of Vivienne Faull as Bishop of Bristol, Warwick has been acting Bishop of Bristol, effective from 2 September 2025.

Church of England titles
Preceded by Christine Froude	Archdeacon of Bristol; 2019 to 2023	Succeeded by Becky Waring
Preceded by Lee Rayfield	Bishop of Swindon; 2023 to present	Incumbent
