= Kenneth Clark (priest) =

English priest

Kenneth James Clark, DSC (31 May 1922 – 29 January 2013) was Archdeacon of Swindon from 1982 to 1992.

He was educated at Watford Grammar School. After Wartime service as a Submariner with the Royal Navy he completed his education at St Catherine's College, Oxford and Ripon College Cuddesdon. After curacies in Brinkworth and Cricklade he was the Incumbent (ecclesiastical) of Holy Cross, Bristol from 1956 to 1961. He was Vicar of Westbury-on-Trym from 1961 to 72; and of St Mary Redcliffe, Bristol from 1972 until his appointment as Archdeacon. He was a Member of the General Synod of the Church of England from 1980 to 1992.

Church of England titles
Preceded by Jeffrey Maples	Archdeacon of Swindon; 1982–1992	Succeeded by Michael John Middleton
