= Henry Randall (priest) =

English Anglican priest

The window depicting the entry into Jerusalem, installed in 1881 as a memorial to Henry Goldney Randall. It was produced by Clayton & Bell and forms part of the chronological Passion sequence along the south choir aisle of St Mary Redcliffe.

Henry Goldney Randall (8 August 1808, in Little Bedwyn, Wiltshire – 8 August 1881) was Archdeacon of Bristol from 1873 until his death at his residence at Christian Malford.

Randall was the second son of Richard Randall of Old Jewry, London. He was educated at St John's College, Oxford, The Queen's College, Oxford and the London College of Divinity. He was ordained deacon in 1834 and priest in 1836. He was vicar of St Mary Redcliffe from 1865 until 1877, and an Honorary Canon of Bristol Cathedral from 1868. From 1877 until his death he was rector of Christian Malford, Wiltshire.

His daughter Mary married in 1867 Charles Cornish (1842–1936), who was in turn vicar of St Mary Redcliffe, and then from 1899 to 1915 Bishop of Grahamstown, South Africa. His only son, Richard (born 1844), trained in law.

Church of England titles
Preceded by Thomas Thorp	Archdeacon of Bristol; 1873–1881	Succeeded by John Norris
