= Michael Doe (bishop) =

The Right Reverend Michael Doe
- Bishop of Swindon
- Diocese: Diocese of Bristol
- In office: 1994–2004
- Predecessor: Peter Firth as Bishop of Malmesbury
- Successor: Lee Rayfield
- Other posts: Preacher to Gray's Inn (8 June 2011–2023); General Secretary, USPG (2004–2011); Honorary assistant bishop in Southwark (2004–present)

Orders
- Ordination: 1972 (deacon); 1973 (priest)
- Consecration: 1994

Personal details
- Born: 24 December 1947 (age 78) Lymington, Hampshire
- Denomination: Anglican
- Parents: Albert & Violet Curtis
- Profession: Bishop
- Education: Durham University

Michael David Doe (born 24 December 1947) former Preacher of Gray's Inn and a former Bishop of Swindon.

Doe was born in Lymington, Hants, and grew up on the Highfield Council Estate there. He attended Brockenhurst Grammar School and went on to Durham University (Bachelor of Arts {BA(Hons)}). After studying at Ripon Hall, Oxford, he was ordained priest in 1973 in Southwark Cathedral. He was a curate on the St Helier Estate in South London, after which he was National Youth Secretary at the British Council of Churches. He moved to Oxford in 1981 to be Priest Missioner in the Blackbird Leys Ecumenical Partnership, and also served as Rural Dean of Cowley from 1987-1989. During this time he co-presented the weekly religious affairs programme on BBC Radio Oxford: "Spirit Level". He was then Social Responsibility Advisor to the Diocese of Portsmouth and a canon residentiary (later, Acting Provost) at Portsmouth Cathedral, before his ordination to the episcopate in 1994 when he became the first Bishop of Swindon, in the Diocese of Bristol. After ten years in this post he was appointed, in 2004, the General Secretary of the mission agency United Society for the Propagation of the Gospel On retirement in 2011 he became Preacher to Gray's Inn, one of the four Inns of Court in London. and retired in Summer 2023. He is an Assistant Bishop in the Diocese of Southwark, and an Honorary Minor Canon of Southwark Cathedral. He chaired the Ecumenical Council for Corporate Responsibility from 2012 to 2015, and served as a trustee of the Balfour Project, later the Britain Palestine Project, 2020 - 2025. In 2002 he was awarded an honorary doctorate from the University of Bath. His publications include "Seeking the Truth in Love - the Church and Homosexuality" (DLT 2000), "Today!" (USPG 2009), and "Saving Power - the Mission of God and the Anglican Communion" (SPCK 2011).

Church of England titles
| Preceded by Peter Firth as Bishop of Malmesbury | Bishop of Swindon; 1994–2004 | Succeeded by Lee Rayfield |
