= John Norris (priest) =

English archdeacon

John Pilkington Norris DD (10 June 1823 in Chester – 29 December 1891 in Bristol) was Archdeacon of Bristol from 1881 until his death.

== Biography ==
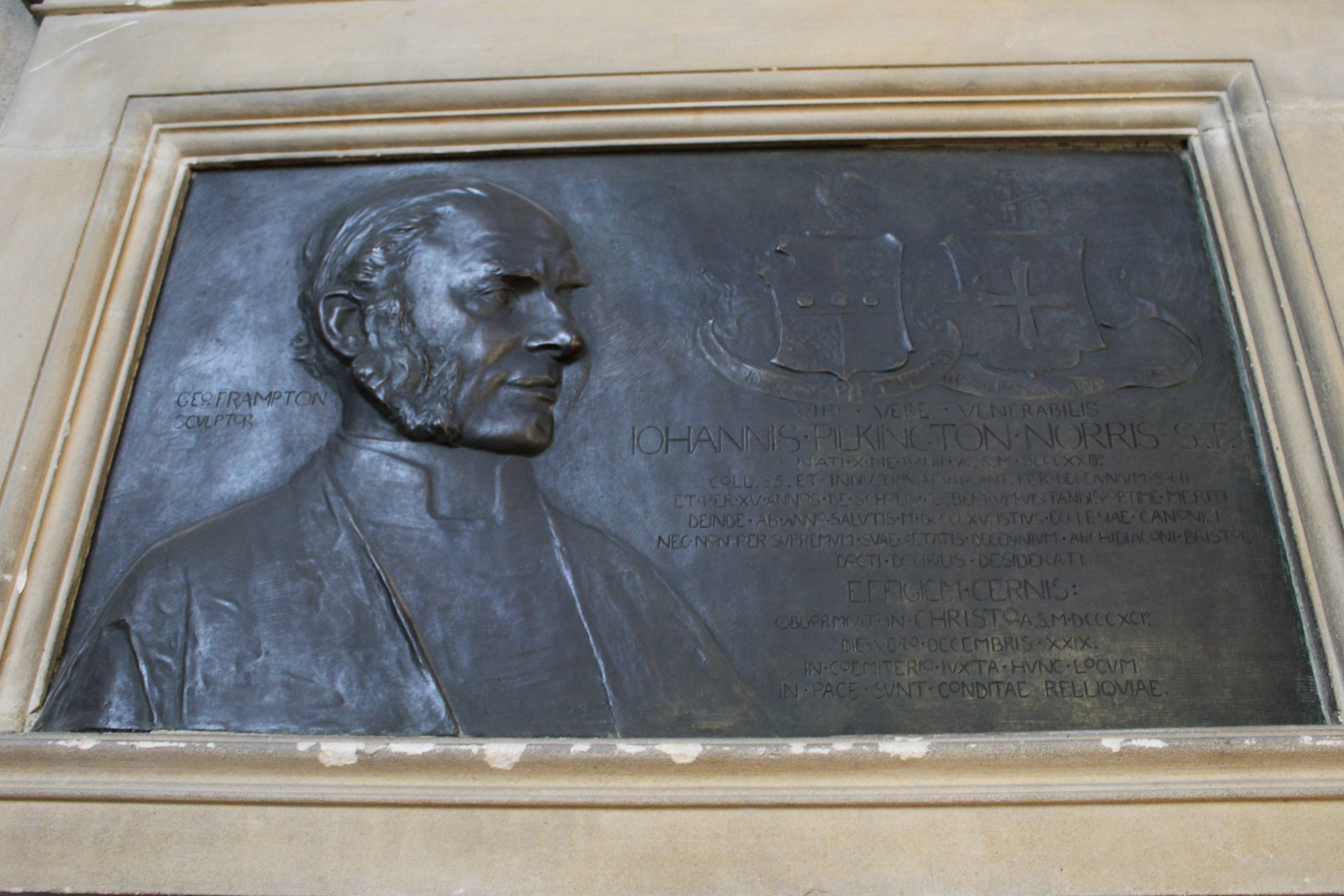
Memorial plaque by George Frampton in Bristol Cathedral

Norris was educated at Trinity College, Cambridge. He was ordained deacon in 1849; and priest in 1850. After a curacy in Trumpington, he was a Schools Inspector until 1864 when he began another curacy at Lewknor. He was Vicar of Hatchford from 1864 to 1870; of Brandon Hill from 1870 to 1877; and of Redcliffe from 1877 to 1882. He was appointed Dean of Chichester just four days before his death. The man appointed in his stead was Richard Randall.

Church of England titles
Preceded by Henry Randall	Archdeacon of Bristol; 1881–1891	Succeeded by Hemming Robeson
