= All Saints Church, Leigh =

All Saints Church
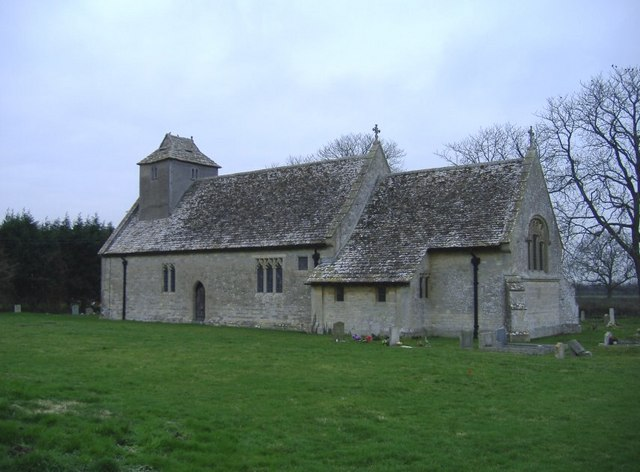

- Location within Wiltshire
- 51°37′42″N 1°54′41″W
- Location: Leigh, Wiltshire, England

History
- Built: 14th century

Listed Building – Grade II*
- Official name: Church of All Saints
- Designated: 17 January 1955
- Reference no.: 1356042

All Saints Church was built around 1250 at Leigh, north Wiltshire, England, and was originally on a site half a mile to the north of its current location. In 1896, the nave, porch and bell tower were moved from their original location and a new church was built, which is now Grade II* listed. The chancel and the east gable of the old nave remain in the old churchyard as All Saints Chancel.

== Moving the church, 1896 ==
By the early 1890s, the church had fallen into significant disrepair and the path leading to it was so wet that during winter it was practically inaccessible. The architect C.E. Ponting urged that the church should be restored and the approach improved. However, the Archdeacon of Bristol, Hemming Robeson, reported that it was "quite impossible to repair the church on its present site and at the same time secure its practical utility. I myself suggested...to rebuild the nave as far as possible, stone for stone, in a more convenient position". This bold course was adopted. Mr. Charles T. Stevens offered to give a site on Swan Lane, about half a mile to the south-east, closer to the scattered settlements of Leigh village.

== The rebuilt church ==
Authorisation was obtained to take down and re-erect the nave, porch and tower at a cost not to exceed £1,300. This was accomplished by carefully marking each stone and each piece of timber to correspond with drawings which had been made to ensure their correct positions, and transporting them to be rebuilt at the current site.

=== Porch ===
The porch was built in the late fourteenth century and the original roof, the door with its handmade nails and a niche with a pedestal for a figure can all still be seen. Also, probably a stoup for holy water.

=== Nave ===
The walls of the nave are thirteenth century but the massive wooden beams of the roof were unique to a parish church with a gothic character. The principal trusses of the roof are of collar form with the moulded braces pierced with openings of quatrefoil shape. Everywhere on the beams and bosses in the main part of the nave are carved heads and figures of Jacobean detail.

At the east end of the nave, the roof has an oak boarded and panelled ceiling which probably dates back to the fifteenth century and was re-fixed in 1638 when the roof was rebuilt. The bosses are extremely rich and delicate in detail.

Standing beneath this ceiling and looking west down the nave, the text that can be seen on the lower part of the bell tower reads:

Colossians Chap III, Vers 16;
Let the word of Christ dwell in you richly in all wisdom; teaching and admonishing one another in psalms and hymns, singing with grace in your hearts to the Lord.

=== Inscriptions ===
Moving the church to a more accessible site is commemorated by inscriptions carved on the south wood moulding:

Rebuilt here 1896 M.J. Milling Vicar.

E. Manners R. Bolton Ch. Wardens.
C.E. Ponting Architect.

W. Light and J. Smith Builders.

On one of the south purlins:

I.T. I.L. C.W. 1783

On the collar of the east truss is carved the commemoration:

John Waldron and John Painter Chappel Wardens 1717 and 18. John Flux Painter.

The present roof was built in 1638 and this is recorded by a carving in the north side wood moulding:

W.T. T.W. H.N. Carpenters

(with a fleur de lys between each initial), continuing:

Blanchadin Wake: John Waldron Church Wardens 1638.

=== Other features ===
There is an 18th-century pulpit and sounding board. The windows are 14th and 15th century and in one window in the north side of the nave a fragment of the original glass can be seen.

Some of the pews near the pulpit are thought to be seventeenth century. Near the door is the font, with its history recorded on a brass plate at the base of the stem. The Rev. M.J. Milling discovered the font being used as a cheese press at an inn in Ashton Keynes and was told that it had previously been used as a cattle trough. Presumably it had been removed from the church and deliberately desecrated at the time of the Parliamentary Commonwealth when infant baptism was forbidden. In 1897, the stem was discovered forming the base of the north-east post of the tower and the whole font was restored to its proper use. The font ewer was given in memory of D.A. Bird, G. Price, V. Ody, and R. Godwin, who gave their lives in World War II.

The chalice is dated 1596, in the reign of Elizabeth I, and the George I silver paten by Thomas Teasle was made in 1723. There was also a pewter flagon and plate for bringing the wine and bread to the altar. The flagon is inscribed "Richard Selby and John Tucker / Chapel Wardens 1776".

=== The bells ===
There are three bells. The largest is inscribed "Henry Neale Made Mee: 1627 GH:ESQVYER:EH:". The middle bell is inscribed "Ave Maria: Gracia Plena" and although no date is inscribed it is thought to have been made in Bristol about 1450. The third bell was cast by Abraham II Rudhall in 1729. At present the bells are said to be unringable.

== Parish ==
Leigh was anciently a chapelry of Ashton Keynes church. Baptisms and marriages took place at Leigh but there was no right of burial until 1865. Although Leigh became a separate civil parish in 1884, for church purposes the benefice continued as 'Ashton Keynes with Leigh'; in 1978 Leigh was still described as a chapelry.

== The church today ==
Leigh parish is part of the Upper Thames group, alongside the churches at Ashton Keynes and Latton, and centred on St Sampson's, Cricklade. Since the congregation is small, services are mainly held at the festivals (Easter, Christmas, and harvest).

== The earlier church ==
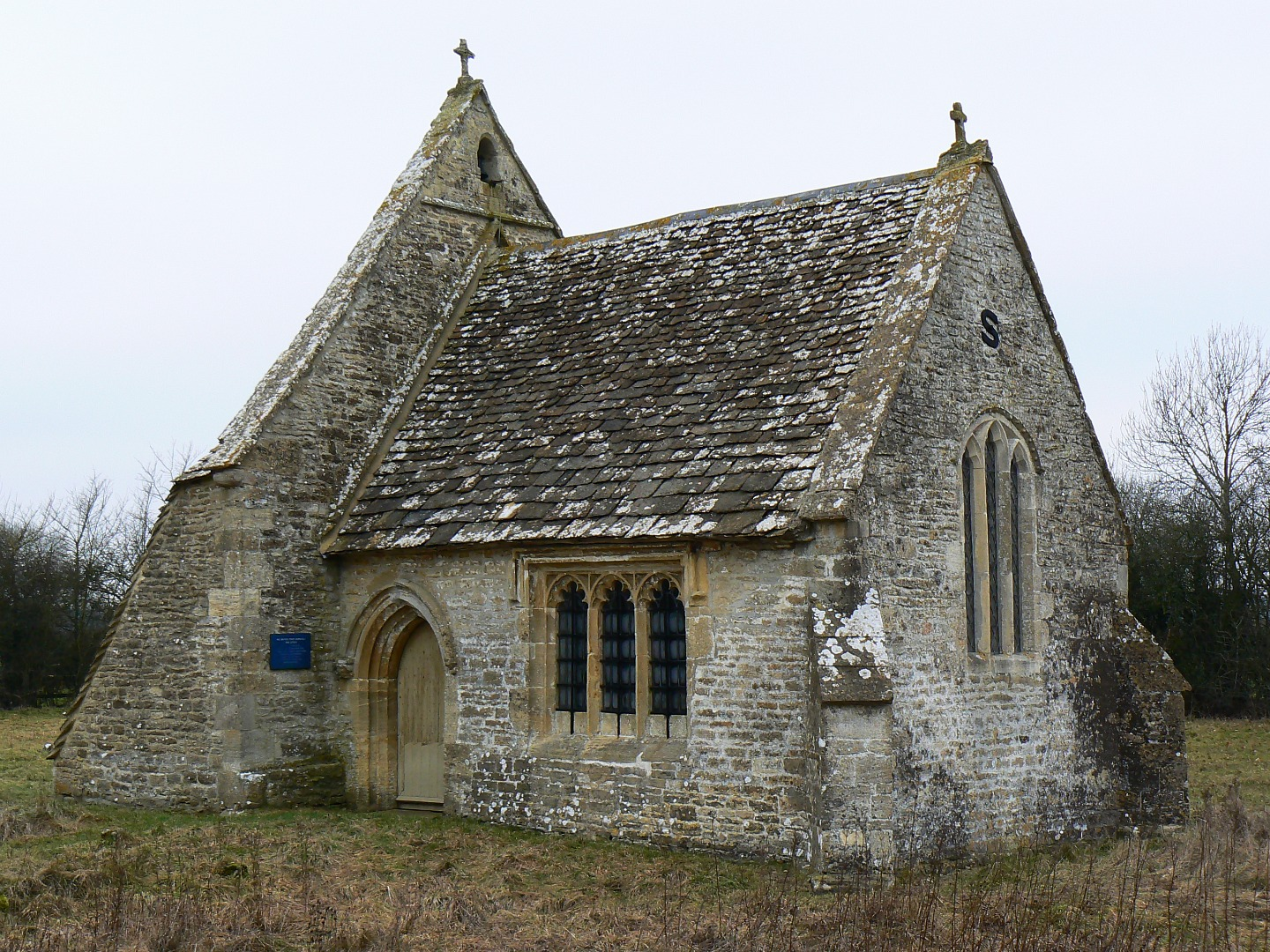
All Saints Chancel, Waterhay, now under the care of the Churches Conservation Trust

All Saints Chancel (the original church) is recorded in the National Heritage List for England as a designated Grade II* listed building, and is a redundant church in the care of the Churches Conservation Trust. It was declared redundant in 1977, and vested in the Trust on 24 October 1978.

The chancel is entered through a finely moulded thirteenth century doorway which has a hood-mould resting on a human head and a beast's head. Inside, on the South wall there is a late thirteenth century window having three stepped lancet lights under one arch. On the wall of the chancel are 17th-century texts painted on the walls and framed in designs of clouds and scrolls. The inside sill is carried down a sedilia and in the east jamb there is a piscina for washing communion vessels. In 1983 the texts were re-lettered in their original style.

Genesis CXVII Ver 1. I am the Almighty God. Walk before me and be thou perfect.

== See also ==
- List of churches preserved by the Churches Conservation Trust in Southwest England
