= Welshman (disambiguation) =

A Welshman is a man from the country of Wales.

Welshman or The Welshman may also refer to:

- The Welshman, one of two named passenger railway trains
- The Welshman (newspaper), defunct weekly (1832–1984)
- Adam the Welshman (c. 1130 – c. 1181), bishop of St. Asaph
- Emery Welshman (born 1991), Canadian-Guyanese footballer
- Welshman Ncube (born 1961), Zimbabwean politician and lawyer

== See also ==
- Welchman, an English surname
- Welshmen Act 1402, repealed English law
