= Charles Alford (priest) =

Charles Symes Leslie Alford (7 February 1885 – 16 May 1963) was Archdeacon of Bristol from 1938 to 1941.

Alford was born in Bristol and educated at Marlborough College and Corpus Christi College, Cambridge, during which time he was a member of its OTC. He was ordained deacon in 1908 and priest in 1909 . After a curacy in Barnard Castle he was with the Royal Army Chaplains' Department from 1910 to 1927. He was then Vicar of Marshfield until his Archdeacon’s appointment. In later years he was Rector of Staple Fitzpaine and then Rowberrow. He died in Wincombe.

Church of England titles
Preceded by William Welchman	Archdeacon of Bristol; 1938–1941	Succeeded by Ivor Stanley Watkins
