= David Banfield (priest) =

David John Banfield (25 June 1933 – 2 October 2014) was Archdeacon of Bristol from 1990 until 1998.

Banfield was educated at Yeovil School and the London College of Divinity. He was ordained deacon in 1957 and priest in 1958 . After a curacy in Middleton, Greater Manchester he was the Chaplain of Scargill House from 1962 to 1967. He was Vicar of Addiscombe; then Luton before his Archdeacon’s appointment.

Church of England titles
Preceded by Anthony James Balmforth	Archdeacon of Bristol; 1990–1998	Succeeded by Timothy Elston McClure
