= Archdeacon of Malmesbury =

Church of England ecclesiastical office

The Archdeacon of Malmesbury is a senior ecclesiastical officer within the English Diocese of Bristol. This officer holds responsibility for disciplinary supervision of the clergy within its four rural deaneries: Chippenham, Kingswood and South Gloucestershire, North Wiltshire and Swindon. Christopher Bryan has been the incumbent since 2019.

== History ==
The Archdeaconry of North Wilts was created from the Archdeaconry of Bristol in the Diocese of Bristol by Order-in-Council on 12 August 1904 and renamed the Archdeaconry of Swindon on 30 May 1919, due to the bishop's concern over confusion with the similarly named Archdeaconry of Wilts in Salisbury diocese. In 1999, Alan Hawker, the last recorded Archdeacon of Swindon, became the first recorded Archdeacon of Malmesbury; the current Malmesbury archdeaconry covers a very similar area to the 1904 North Wilts archdeaconry.

John Sherman (d. 1671) was said (once, in 1814) to have succeeded Joshua Childrey as "Archdeacon of North Wiltshire" while serving as chaplain to Seth Ward, Bishop of Salisbury; it is well-recorded that Sharman succeeded Childrey as Archdeacon of Salisbury in 1670.

== List of archdeacons ==
At its creation, the archdeaconry was called North Wilts.

- 1904–1909 (res.): Hemming Robeson
- 1910–1919 (ret.): Ravenscroft Stewart

From 30 May 1919, the archdeaconry was renamed Swindon.

- 1919–1928 (res.): Reginald Talbot
- 1928–1947 (ret.): Ronald Ramsay (also Bishop suffragan of Malmesbury, 1927–1946)
- 1947–1963 (ret.): Leonard Cornwell (afterwards archdeacon emeritus)
- 1963–1969 (res.): Cyril Bowles
- 1970–1973 (res.): Freddy Temple
- 1974–1982 (ret.): Jeffrey Maples (afterwards archdeacon emeritus)
- 1982–1992 (ret.): Kenneth Clark
- 1992–1997 (res.): Michael Middleton
- 1998–1999: Alan Hawker (became Archdeacon of Malmesbury)

Since 1999, the archdeaconry has been called Malmesbury.

- 1999 – 1 November 2010 (ret.): Alan Hawker (previously Archdeacon of Swindon; afterwards archdeacon emeritus)
- 1 November 2010 – 2011 (Acting): Hedley Ringrose
- 2011 – 30 September 2018 (ret.): Christine Froude (also Acting Archdeacon of Bristol from December 2012)
  - from January 2013 until 1 April 2015, Derek Chedzey was part-time Assistant Archdeacon for the diocese
- 4 October 2018 – 2019: Graham Archer (Acting)
- 7 May 2019 – present: Christopher Bryan
