= Peter Firth (bishop) =

English Anglican clergyman (1929–2024)

The Rt Revd Peter Firth MA(Cantab) DipEd
- Bishop of Malmesbury
- Diocese: Diocese of Bristol
- In office: 1983–1994
- Predecessor: Freddy Temple
- Successor: Michael Doe as Bishop of Swindon
- Other post: Honorary assistant bishop in Gloucester (2003–2024)

Orders
- Ordination: 1955 (deacon); 1956 (priest)
- Consecration: 30 November 1983 by Robert Runcie

Personal details
- Born: 12 July 1929
- Died: 16 February 2024 (aged 94)
- Denomination: Anglican
- Parents: Atkinson and Edith Pepper
- Spouse: Felicity Wilding (m. 1955)
- Children: Two sons, three daughters
- Education: Emmanuel College, Cambridge

Peter James Firth (12 July 1929 – 16 February 2024) was an English Anglican clergyman who was the Bishop suffragan of Malmesbury from 1983 until 1994.

== Biography ==
Born on 12 July 1929, Firth was educated at Stockport Grammar School and Emmanuel College, Cambridge. He trained for ordination at St Stephen's House, Oxford, and was ordained deacon in 1955 and priest in 1956. He was a curate at St Stephen's Barbourne. Following this he was priest in charge at the Church of the Ascension, Malvern and then Rector of St George's Gorton and in the early 1960's was a regular contributor to religious broadcasts at BBC Manchester. From 1967 to 1983 he worked in various capacities for the Religious Broadcasting Unit at BBC South West. He was ordained to the episcopate by Robert Runcie, Archbishop of Canterbury, on 30 November 1983 at Southwark Cathedral. He retired in 1994 and was an honorary assistant bishop in the Diocese of Gloucester, where he settled at Winchcombe, as well as the Diocese of Bristol.

Firth died on 16 February 2024, at the age of 94.

Church of England titles
Preceded by Freddy Temple	Bishop of Malmesbury; 1983–1994	Succeeded by Michael Doe as Bishop of Swindon
