= Leslie Williams (archdeacon of Bristol) =

Leslie Arthur Williams (14 May 1909 – 2 July 1996) was Archdeacon of Bristol from 1967 to 1979.

Williams was educated at Downing College, Cambridge and ordained in 1935. He was Vicar of Corsham from 1947 to 1953; of Bishopston from 1953 to 1960; and of Stoke Bishop until his Archdeacon’s appointment.

Church of England titles
Preceded by Percy George Reddick	Archdeacon of Bristol; 1967–1979	Succeeded by Anthony Balmforth
