= Jim Bishop (bishop) =

British bishop (1908–1994)

Clifford Leofric Purdy "Jim" Bishop was the Suffragan Bishop of Malmesbury from 1962 until 1973 in the Church of England.

== Life ==
He was born on 11 June 1908 and educated at St. John's School, Leatherhead and Christ's College, Cambridge. Ordained in 1933 and later Vicar of St George's, Camberwell, he was also Rural Dean of Walsingham and then Wearmouth until his ordination to the episcopate. He died on 1 September 1994.

Church of England titles
Preceded by Edward Roberts	Bishop of Malmesbury; 1962 –1973	Succeeded by Freddy Temple
