= Archdeacon of Bristol =

Church of England ecclesiastical office

The Archdeacon of Bristol is a senior ecclesiastical officer within the Diocese of Bristol. The archdeaconry was created – within the Diocese of Gloucester and Bristol – by Order in Council on 7 October 1836 and became part of the re-erected Diocese of Bristol on 8 February 1898.

As archdeacon she or he is responsible for the disciplinary supervision of the clergy within three area deaneries: Bristol City, Bristol South and Bristol West.

== List of archdeacons ==
- 1836–1873: Thomas Thorp
- 1873–1881: Henry Randall
- 1881–1891: John Norris
- 1891–1904: Hemming Robeson

In 1898, the archdeaconry was transferred from Gloucester & Bristol diocese to the new Diocese of Bristol.

- 1904–1910: Ravenscroft Stewart
- 1910–1921: James Tetley
- 1921–1927: Charles Dickinson
- 1927–1938: William Welchman (afterwards archdeacon emeritus)
- 1938–1941 (res.): Charles Alford
- 1941–1950: Ivor Watkins (Bishop suffragan of Malmesbury from 1946)
- 1950–1967: Percy Reddick (afterwards archdeacon emeritus)
- 1967–1979: Leslie Williams (afterwards archdeacon emeritus)
- 1979–1990: Anthony Balmforth (afterwards archdeacon emeritus)
- 1990–1998: David Banfield
- 1999–July 2012: Tim McClure
- December 2012 – 1 June 2018: Christine Froude, Archdeacon of Malmesbury (Acting)
  - from January 2013 until 1 April 2015, Derek Chedzey was part-time Assistant Archdeacon for the diocese.
- July 2018 – July 2019: Michael Johnson (Acting; for a one-year term)
- 4 September 2019 – 30 November 2023: Neil Warwick (became Bishop of Swindon)
- 1 September 2024 – present: Becky Waring
