= Charles Dickinson (priest) =

Charles Henry Dickinson (1871–1930) was Archdeacon of Bristol from 1921 until 1927.

Dickinson educated at Haileybury and Keble College, Oxford. He was ordained deacon in 1895 and priest in 1896. After curacies in Cricklade and Brandon Hill he was Vicar of All Saints, Bristol from 1905 until his Archdeacon’s appointment.

He died on 10 January 1930. Thorold Dickinson, his son, was a filmmaker.

Church of England titles
Preceded by James George Tetley	Archdeacon of Bristol; 1921–1927	Succeeded by William Welchman
