= Leonard Cornwell =

Archdeacon of Swindon (1893–1971)

Leonard Cyril Cornwell (28 March 1893 – 16 March 1971) was Archdeacon of Swindon from 1947 to 1963.

He was educated at Fitzwilliam College, Cambridge and Ridley Hall, Cambridge and ordained in 1916. He first posts were as a Curate in Plymouth and then, from 1918 to 1921, as a Chaplain to the Forces. After further curacies in Chippenham and Bristol he held incumbencies in Chippenham and Brinkworth.

Church of England titles
Preceded by Ronald Erskine Ramsay	Archdeacon of Swindon; 1947–1963	Succeeded by Cyril William Johnston Bowles
