= Edward Roberts (bishop) =

Edward James Keymer Roberts (18 April 1908 – 29 July 2001) was an Anglican bishop who held three separate episcopal appointments between 1956 and 1977.

Roberts was educated at Marlborough and Corpus Christi College, Cambridge and ordained priest in 1932. After a curacy at All Saints Church, Margaret Street in central London and four years as Vice Principal of Cuddesdon, he was to spend a long period in the Diocese of Portsmouth as successively examining chaplain to the bishop, vicar of St Matthew's Southsea, Archdeacon of the Isle of Wight (1948–52) and Archdeacon of Portsmouth before being ordained to the episcopate in 1956. After six years in Wiltshire, he was translated to be the Bishop of Kensington in 1962 and again, two years later, to be the Bishop of Ely. In 1977 he retired to his former Isle of Wight parish where he died on 29 June 2001, aged 93.

Church of England titles
Preceded by Ivor Watkins	Bishop of Malmesbury; 1956–1962	Succeeded by Jim Bishop
Preceded by Cyril Easthaugh	Bishop of Kensington; 1962–1964	Succeeded by Ronald Goodchild
Preceded by Noel Hudson	Bishop of Ely; 1964–1977	Succeeded by Peter Walker
