= Welchman =

Welchman is an English surname. Notable people with the surname include:

- Edward Welchman (1665–1739), English theologian and Archdeacon of Cardigan
- Gordon Welchman (1906–1985), English mathematician, academic, codebreaker and writer
- Harry Welchman (1886–1966), English actor
- Hugh Welchman (born 1975), British filmmaker, screenwriter and producer
- Marion Welchman (1915-1997), British charity administrator
- William Welchman (1866–1954), Archdeacon of Bristol
