= Anthony Balmforth =

Archdeacon of Bristol

Anthony James Balmforth (3 September 1926 – 20 February 2009) was Archdeacon of Bristol from 1979 until 1990.

Balmforth educated at Sebright School and Brasenose College, Oxford. He was ordained Deacon in 1952 and Priest in 1953. After a curacy in Mansfield he held incumbencies in Skegby, Kidderminster and Kings Norton until his Archdeacon’s appointment.

Church of England titles
Preceded by Leslie Williams	Archdeacon of Bristol; 1979–1990	Succeeded by David Banfield
