= Jeffrey Maples =

Jeffrey Stanley Maples (8 August 1916 – 14 September 2001) was Archdeacon of Swindon from 1974 to 1982.

After curacies in Portsmouth and Watlington he was Vicar of Swinderby from 1948 to 1950. He was Vicar of Vicar of St Michael-on-the-Mount, Lincoln, 1from 1950 to 1956. He was Director of Religious Education for the Diocese of Salisbury from 1956 to 1963; and a Canon Residentiary of Salisbury Cathedral from 1960 to 1967. He was Vicar of St James, Milton, Portsmouth from 1967 to 1974; and Rural Dean of Portsmouth from 1968 to 1973.

Church of England titles
Preceded by Frederick Stephen Temple	Archdeacon of Swindon; 1974–1982	Succeeded by Kenneth James Clark
