= Henry Stewart (footballer, born 1847) =

Scottish footballer and clergyman

Rev. Henry Holmes Stewart (8 November 1847 – 20 March 1937) was a Scottish clergyman who was a member of the Wanderers team which won the FA Cup in 1873. He also played for the Scottish team in 1872 in the last of the series of representative football matches against England.

== Family and education ==
Stewart was born in Cairnsmuir, near Newton Stewart, Kirkcudbrightshire, the son of James Stewart and Elizabeth MacLeod. His brothers included James (1840–1938) and Ravenscroft (1845–1921), both of whom also attended Trinity College.

He attended Repton School and Loretto College, Edinburgh before going up to Trinity College, Cambridge in 1867. He graduated in 1871 with a BA and was awarded his MA in 1874.

On 28 July 1874, he married Lady Beatrice Diana Cecilia Carnegie, daughter of James Carnegie, 9th Earl of Southesk and Lady Catherine Hamilton Noel.

== Cricket career ==
At Repton School, he was an outstanding cricketer and was in the school team from 1865 to 1867; in his final season, he was the school's best batsman. He also played cricket for Cambridge University although he did not play any first class matches. He also played for MCC and I Zingari.

Following his move to Glamorgan, he played village cricket, continuing well into the twentieth century.

== Football career ==
After leaving university, he joined the Wanderers club. He made his debut for them on 4 March 1872 at Kennington Oval in the semi-final of the FA Cup against the Scottish team, Queens Park; this was the first time that a Scottish side had visited London and the Scots' travelling expenses were met by public subscription in Glasgow. The match ended in a 0–0 draw; as Queens Park were unable to raise the cost of a second trip to London, they scratched from the competition, leaving Wanderers a walkover to the final.

Two weeks before the FA Cup semi-final, Stewart was a member of the Scottish team that played England in what was to be the last of the series of representative matches between the two countries. The match ended with a 1–0 victory for the English. In a match report, Stewart was praised for his "untiring forward play throughout".

In the next season, Stewart played frequently for the Wanderers making eight appearances. He was variously described as "keeps well on the ball and never flags" and "sticks close to the ball and follows up hard; a very useful forward". As holders, Wanderers were given a "bye" to the Cup Final in which Stewart was selected as one of the eight forwards. The final, played against Oxford University at Lillie Bridge on 29 March 1873 ended in a 2–0 victory for the Wanderers.

Stewart played three more matches for the Wanderers in 1873–74 before his clerical career took him away from London.

== Clerical career ==
Stewart was ordained as a deacon in London in 1872 and as a priest in 1873. He was curate at St. John's, Holborn from 1872 to 1874 and then vicar at East Witton, North Riding of Yorkshire from 1874 to 1878. He was then rector at Brington, Northamptonshire (1878–1898), vicar at Porthkerry with Barry, Glamorgan (1898–1914), vicar at St. Lythan's, Glamorgan (1914–1925) and, finally, rector at Michaelston-le-Pit, Glamorgan from 1925 to 1935.

He died on 20 March 1937, aged 89 years, at his home at Dinas Powys, Glamorgan.
