= Charles Cornish =

The Right Reverend Dr Charles Cornish DD
- Bishop of Grahamstown
- Church: Anglican
- Diocese: Grahamstown
- In office: 1899–1915

Orders
- Ordination: 1870
- Consecration: 1899

Personal details
- Born: 9 October 1842
- Died: 14 July 1936 (aged 93)

Charles Edward Cornish (9 October 1842 – 14 July 1936) was an Anglican bishop in the late 19th and early 20th centuries.

== Early life ==
Cornish was born to Charles Lewis Cornish (then Dean of Exeter College, Oxford) and Eleanor Monro in London, England on 9 October 1842. He was educated at Uppingham and Exeter College, Oxford, where he graduated with an MA and DD He also earned an MA from the University of Cape Town.

He married Mary Randall, daughter of Henry Randall (later Archdeacon of Bristol) in Bristol in 1867.

== Church career ==
Cornish was ordained in 1870. After a curacy at St George's, Bristol, he held incumbencies at St Peter and St Paul, South Petherton and St Mary Redcliffe, Bristol; his wife's father had earlier also been vicar of St Mary Redcliffe. In 1899, he was appointed Bishop of Grahamstown, Cape Colony, a post he held for 16 years.

He died on 14 July 1936.

== Publications ==
- Quiet Days. By the Author of "Præparatio," Etc. With a Preface by the Right Rev. the Lord Bishop of Grahamstown [i.e. Charles E. Cornish]. London, Oxford. 1909.
- Charge Delivered to the Clergy of the Diocese of Grahamstown ... July 3rd, 1902, and Charge Delivered to the Synod ... July 5th, 1902, Etc. Grahamstown: Grocott & Sherry. 1902.

Anglican Church of Southern Africa titles
Preceded by Allan Webb	Bishop of Grahamstown; 1899 –1915	Succeeded by Francis Phelps
