= Michael Middleton (priest) =

Michael John Middleton (born 21 July 1940) was Archdeacon of Swindon from 1992 to 1997

He was educated at Fitzwilliam College, Cambridge and Westcott House, Cambridge. He was ordained deacon in 1966; and priest in 1967. After a curacy at St George, Jesmond he was Chaplain at St George's Grammar School, Cape Town from 1969 to 1972. Returning to England he was at King's School Tynemouth from 1972 to 1977; Vicar of St George, Jesmond from 1977 to 1985; and Rector of Hexham from 1985 to 1992.

== Notes ==
Church of England titles
Preceded by Jeffrey Maples	Archdeacon of Swindon; 1982–192	Succeeded by Alan Hawker
