= Alan Hawker =

Alan Fort Hawker (born 23 March 1944) was Archdeacon of Swindon from 1998 to 1999; and Archdeacon of Malmesbury from 1999 to 2010.

He was educated at Buckhurst Hill County High School and the University of Hull. After curacies in Bootle and Fazakerley he was Vicar, St Paul, Goose Green, Greater Manchester from 1973 until 1981. He was Team Rector of St Mary, Southgate from 1981 to 1998.
