= Ravenscroft Stewart =

Ravenscroft Stewart was an eminent Anglican priest in the late nineteenth and early twentieth centuries.

Stewart was born in Newton Stewart on 23 June 1845, educated at Loretto; Uppingham and Trinity College, Cambridge and ordained in 1870. After a curacy in Bakewell he was Rector of Pleasley from 1871 to 1883; Vicar of All Saints Ennismore Gardens from 1884 to 1909; Archdeacon of Bristol from 1904 to 1910; and Archdeacon of North Wilts from 1910 to 1919.

He died at home in Burnham-on-Sea on 16 August 1921. His brother Henry, also a priest, was a member of the Wanderers team which won the FA Cup in 1873; and his son Weston was Bishop in Jerusalem from 1943 to 1957.
