= Yuen Yuen Ang =

Singaporean political scientist

- 洪源远
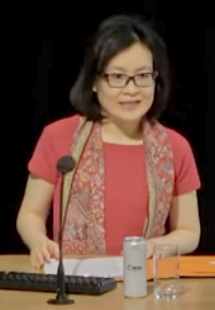
- Ang in 2024
- Born: Singapore
- Occupation: Professor of political economy
- Title: Alfred Chandler Chair Professor of Political Economy at Johns Hopkins University
- Awards: Theda Skocpol Prize (APSA), 2020

Academic background
- Education: Colorado College; Stanford University (PhD)
- Thesis: State, market, and bureau-contracting in reform China (2010)
- Doctoral advisor: Jean C. Oi

Academic work
- Institutions: Columbia University; University of Michigan; Johns Hopkins University
- Website: yuenyuenang.org

Yuen Yuen Ang
- Simplified Chinese: 洪源远
- Traditional Chinese: 洪源遠
Transcriptions
Standard Mandarin
- Hanyu Pinyin: Hóng Yuányuǎn
Yue: Cantonese
- Jyutping: Hung^{4} Jyun^{4}-jyun^{5}
Southern Min
- Hokkien POJ: Âng Guân-hn̄g
- Teochew Peng'im: Ang5 Nguêng5-iêng2

Yuen Yuen Ang (Note: In this Chinese name, the family name is Ang.) is a Singaporean professor of political science who is currently the Alfred Chandler Chair of Political Economy at Johns Hopkins University. She is the author of two books: How China Escaped the Poverty Trap (2016), named one of the "Best Books of 2017" by Foreign Affairs, and China's Gilded Age (2020).

== Early life and education ==
Ang was born in Singapore. She studied at Colorado College and received a Ph.D. in political science from Stanford University in 2010.

== Career ==
Ang was an assistant professor at the School of International and Public Affairs, Columbia University in 2010–2011, and in 2011 became an associate professor of political science at the University of Michigan. On 12 January 2023, she became the first newly named professor at the Center for Economy and Society (CES) and the Department of Political Science at Johns Hopkins University's Krieger School of Arts and Sciences.

She is also active in public policy debates, and her opinion columns have been published in Foreign Affairs and Project Syndicate, among others. She has been interviewed on Freakonomics Radio and the Ezra Klein Show, among other outlets.

In 2023, Ang was appointed Alfred Chandler Chair of Political Economy at Johns Hopkins University.

=== Writing ===
Ang's first book, How China Escaped the Poverty Trap, won the Peter Katzenstein and Viviana Zelizer book prizes and was named among the "Best of Books" by Foreign Affairs. In a review published by the London School of Economics, Duncan Green wrote that "its lessons apply far beyond China's borders".

In China's Gilded Age (2020), Ang compares present-day China with 19th-century America, challenging assumptions of Chinese exceptionalism. The book received the Douglass North and Alice Amsden book prizes in 2022.

== Publications ==
=== Books ===
- How China Escaped the Poverty Trap, Cornell University Press: Cornell Studies in Political Economy, 2016
- China's Gilded Age: The Paradox of Economic Boom and Vast Corruption, Cambridge University Press, 2020

=== Articles ===
- "Adaptive Political Economy," World Politics, Vol 77, 2024.
- "AIM: Adaptive, Inclusive & Moral Political Economy", Oxford Development Studies, 2026.

=== Essays ===
- "Autocracy with Chinese Characteristics", Foreign Affairs, 16 April 2018
- "The Real China Model", Foreign Affairs, 29 June 2018
- "Demystifying Belt and Road", Foreign Affairs, 22 May 2019
- "Decoding Xi Jinping", Foreign Affairs, 8 December 2021
- "How Resilient Is the CCP?" Journal of Democracy, July 2022
- "The Problem with Zero", Foreign Affairs, 2 December 2022
- "Is China Back?" The Wire China, 22 January 2023
- "The Global Polytunity", Project Syndicate, 29 October 2025.

== Awards ==
- 2017 Peter Katzenstein Book Prize
- 2017 Foreign Affairs "Best of Books" for How China Escaped the Poverty Trap
- 2018 Andrew Carnegie Fellow for "high-caliber scholarship that applies fresh perspectives to the most pressing issues of our times"
- 2018 Viviana Zelizer Best Book in Economic Sociology, awarded by the American Sociological Association
- 2020 Theda Skocpol Prize, awarded by the American Political Science Association for "impactful contributions to the study of comparative politics"
- 2022 Douglass North Best Book Prize, awarded by the Society for Institutional and Organizational Economics
- 2022 Alice Amsden Book Award, awarded by the Society for the Advancement of Socio-Economics
