= Goose Green, Greater Manchester =

Area of Wigan, England

Coordinates: 53.525°N 2.655°W

Goose Green is a mainly residential area of Wigan, Greater Manchester, England. Historically, it forms part of Lancashire.
