= William Welchman =

William Welchman (1866–1954) was Archdeacon of Bristol from 1927 to 1937.

Welchman was born in Cullompton and educated at Queens' College, Cambridge. He was ordained after a period of study at Ridley Hall, Cambridge in 1891. After a curacy at St Paul's, Leamington Spa he was a missionary in Ceylon from 1892 to 1899. He was the Vicar of Fishponds, Bristol from 1901 to 1907; and of Temple Church in the same city until 1941.

He died on 7 March 1954.

Church of England titles
Preceded by Charles Henry Dickinson	Archdeacon of Bristol; 1927–1937	Succeeded by Charles Symes Leslie Alford
