= Ronald Ramsay =

British bishop

Ronald Erskine Ramsay was the first Suffragan Bishop of Malmesbury, with the additional title of Archdeacon of Swindon, from 1927 until 1946.

He was born on 4 November 1882 and educated at St Edmund Hall, Oxford. Ordained in 1909 his first post was a curacy in Lozells. Later Warden of the Clifton College Mission, he served during the First World War as a chaplain to the Forces. He had been interviewed in May 1916, and his experience of extempore preaching at open-air meetings made him a suitable candidate for the Chaplaincy. He served for one year in France with the Glosters including when they were active during the Battle of the Somme Following this he was Clerical Secretary to the Bristol Board of Finance until his ordination to the episcopate. A man of deep compassion, he retired in 1946 and died on 26 March 1954.

An obituary on one of his sons referred to his father, Ronald, being a notable cricketer and the only bishop known to have been captain of his golf club.

Church of England titles
New office	Bishop of Malmesbury; 1927–1946	Succeeded by Ivor Watkins
