= Tim McClure =

English priest (born 1946)

Timothy Elston McClure (born 20 October 1946) is a Church of England priest. He was Archdeacon of Bristol from 1999 until 2012.

McClure was educated at Kingston Grammar School, Durham University, and Ridley Hall, Cambridge.

He was ordained Deacon in 1970, and Priest in 1971. After a curacy in Kirkheaton he was Chaplain at Manchester Polytechnic from 1974 to 1982 then General Secretary of the SCM until 1992. He was director of the Churches’ Council for Industry and Social Responsibility in Bristol from 1992 until his appointment as Archdeacon.
