= Thomas Thorp (priest) =

19th Century priest

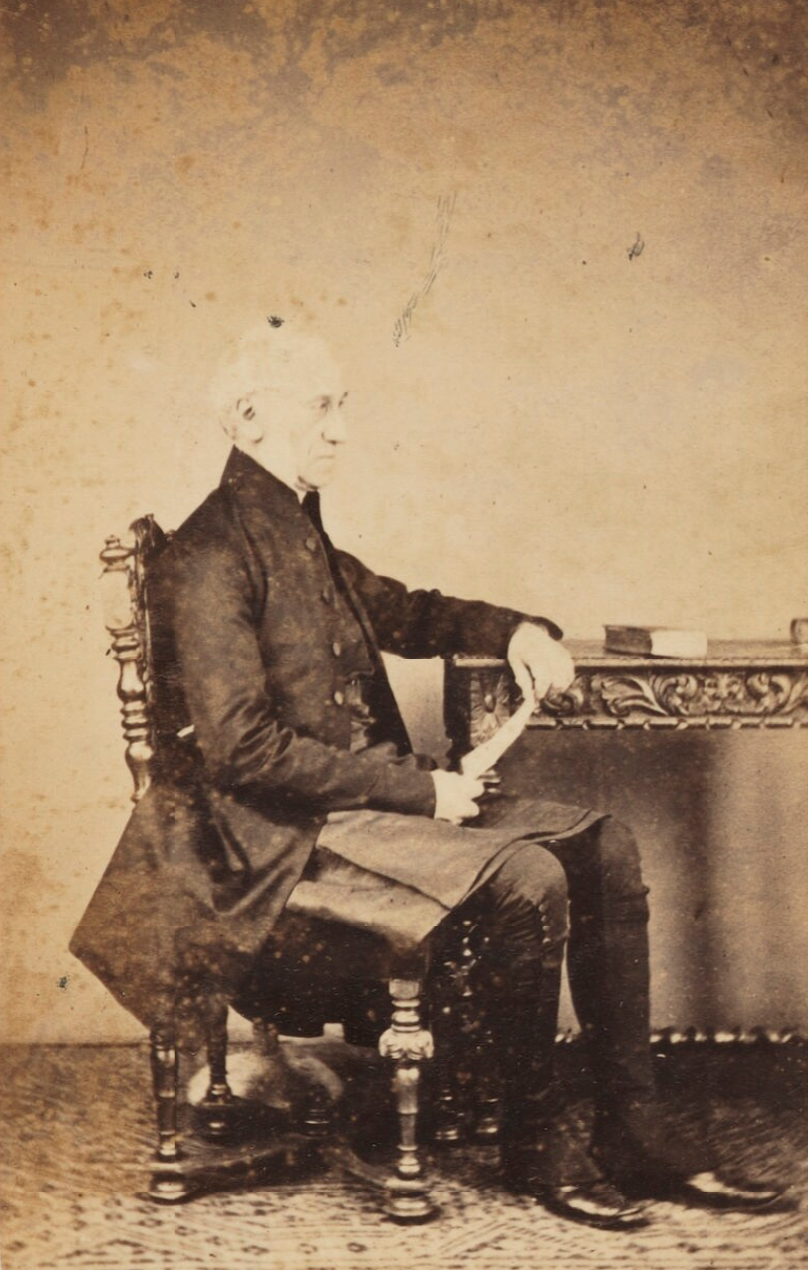
- 1863 photograph
- Born: 4 March 1797
- Died: 24 February 1877 (aged 79)
- Education: King's School, Pontefract and Trinity College, Cambridge
- Occupation: priest
- Known for: Archdeacon of Bristol

Thomas Thorp (4 March 1797 – 24 February 1877) was Archdeacon of Bristol from 1836 until 1873.

Thorp was educated at King's School, Pontefract and Trinity College, Cambridge. He was ordained deacon and priest in 1829. He was Rector of Kemerton from 1839 to 1877.
