= Christopher Bryan (priest) =

British priest (born 1975)

Christopher Paul Bryan (born 1975) has been Archdeacon of Malmesbury since 2019.

Bryan was educated at RGS High Wycombe and University College, Oxford, and was ordained in 2001. After a curacy in Old Swinford, Dudley he was priest in charge of St Lawrence, Lechlade, Gloucestershire. He has also held posts in Fairford (Gloucestershire) and the Gauzebrook Benefice (Wiltshire). He was Area Dean of North Wiltshire before his appointment as Archdeacon.

Church of England titles
Preceded by Christine Froude	Archdeacon of Malmesbury; 2019–present	Succeeded by Incumbent
