= Freddy Temple =

Frederick Stephen "Freddy" Temple (24 November 1916 – 26 November 2000) was the Suffragan Bishop of Malmesbury in the Diocese of Bristol from 1973 until 1983.

Temple was the grandson of Frederick Temple and the nephew of William Temple, both Archbishops of Canterbury. He was educated at Rugby School and Balliol College, Oxford. He was ordained in 1948 and was a curate in Newark and later Rector of St Agnes' Longsight and Dean of Hong Kong. He returned to England to be senior chaplain to Geoffrey Fisher, then Archbishop of Canterbury. He was then Vicar of St Mary’s Portsea, Portsmouth, the largest parish in the city, and then Archdeacon of Malmesbury until his ordination to the episcopate. He retired in 1983 and died on 26 November 2000.

Church of England titles
Preceded by Alaric Rose	Dean of Hong Kong; 1953 –1959	Succeeded by Barry Till
Preceded by Jim Bishop	Bishop of Malmesbury; 1973 –1983	Succeeded by Peter Firth
