= Collation (disambiguation) =

In library, information and computer science, collation is the process of assembling written information into a standard order.

Collation may also have the following meanings:

- Collation (meal), a light meal
- In succession law, collation is an act of estimating the value of the intestate property
- In ecclesiastical law, collation is the legal process and ritual act by which a parish priest is appointed to their living, especially in Anglicanism
- In textual criticism and bibliography, collation is the process of determining the differences between two or more texts found in the detailed bibliography of a book or the comparison of the physical makeup of two copies of a book
- In printing and photocopying, bookbinding, also called collation, is ordering pages when several copies of a document are bound after printing or copying
