= Hemming Robeson =

Hemming Robeson was an eminent Anglican priest in the late nineteenth and early twentieth centuries.

Robeson was born in Bromsgrove, Worcestershire, the only son of William Henry Robeson. He was educated at Cheltenham College and Balliol College, Oxford, where he matriculated in November 1850, aged 17. He was ordained deacon in 1857 and priest in 1858. After a curacy at Bray, Berkshire from 1857 to 1862, he was vicar of Forthampton, Gloucestershire until 1874, then vicar of Mildenhall, Suffolk until 1877. Later in his career, he was vicar of Tewkesbury from 1877 to 1892, then Archdeacon of Bristol from 1892 to 1904, and finally Archdeacon of North Wilts from 1904 to 1909.

His children included at least three sons: Arthur (the eldest), and Herbert (third son), both born during his incumbency at Forthampton, also went up to Oxford.

He died on 16 June 1912.
