= Bishop of Swindon =

Church of England suffragan bishophood

The Bishop of Swindon is an episcopal title used by a suffragan bishop of the Church of England Diocese of Bristol, in the Province of Canterbury, England. The title takes its name after the town of Swindon in Wiltshire. The title of Bishop of Malmesbury was the precursor title, named after Malmesbury in Wiltshire; the See was erected under the Suffragans Nomination Act 1888 by Order in Council dated 25 July 1927. The name was changed from Malmesbury to Swindon at the same time as the archdeaconry was renamed from Swindon to Malmesbury. The suffragan bishop assists the Bishop of Bristol in overseeing the diocese.

== List of bishops of Swindon ==
Bishops of Malmesbury
From	Until	Incumbent	Notes
1927	1946	Ronald Ramsay	
1946	1956	Ivor Watkins	Translated to Guildford
1956	1962	Edward Roberts	Translated to Kensington
1962	1973	Jim Bishop	
1973	1983	Freddy Temple	
1983	1994	Peter Firth	
Bishops of Swindon
1994	2004	Michael Doe	
2005	2023	Lee Rayfield	Also Acting Bishop of Bristol, 2017–18. Retired 30 April 2023.
2023	present	Neil Warwick	Consecrated 30 November 2023.
