= Ivor Watkins =

Anglican bishop

Ivor Stanley Watkins (10 November 1896 – 24 October 1960) was an Anglican bishop who served in two posts between 1946 and his death.

Watkins was born in 1896 and educated at Hereford Cathedral School. During the First World War, he served in the Royal Army Medical Corps as a stretcher-bearer and was gassed. He spent considerable time in hospital where he learnt the 3-card trick which he used to entertain children. After the war he briefly attended the emergency ordination school at Knutsford before gaining a place at Trinity Hall, Cambridge where he was awarded a degree in history and theology. He was made deacon on Trinity Sunday 1924 (15 June) at St John's Bedminster (his title parish) and ordained a priest that Advent (21 December 1924) at Bristol Cathedral, both times by George Nickson, Bishop of Bristol. Following a curacy in Bedminster, he rose steadily in the Church hierarchy, being successively Vicar of St Gregory’s Horfield, rural dean, then Archdeacon of Bristol before elevation to that diocese's suffragan bishopric as Bishop of Malmesbury. He was consecrated a bishop on All Saints' Day 1946 (1 November) at Westminster Abbey. Watkins was considered for promotion to several diocesan bishoprics over the next ten years. He was regarded as a 'somewhat advanced' Anglo-Catholic. When the vacancy at Wakefield arose in 1948, Clement Attlee, the prime minister at that time responsible for recommending nominations to bishoprics, wrote:

I do not consider this man suitable for appointment to a See. I think he is narrow-minded.

Watkins' name was prominent to fill vacancies at Portsmouth in 1949, Gloucester in 1953 and Durham, Lincoln and Peterborough in 1955–1956. Archbishop Michael Ramsey, newly translated from Durham to York, wanted Watkins to succeed him at Durham but the Archbishop of Canterbury opposed the nomination. Instead Watkins was appointed to Guildford. In his short time at Guildford, Watkins proved very successful. He 'won the hearts and minds of both clergy and laity by his active and diligent pastoral ministry. He died in office in 1960 aged 63.

Church of England titles
Preceded by Ronald Ramsay	Bishop of Malmesbury; 1946 – 1956	Succeeded by Edward Roberts
Preceded by Henry Montgomery Campbell	Bishop of Guildford; 1956 – 1960	Succeeded by George Reindorp
