= Gordon Redding =

British professor (1937–2024)

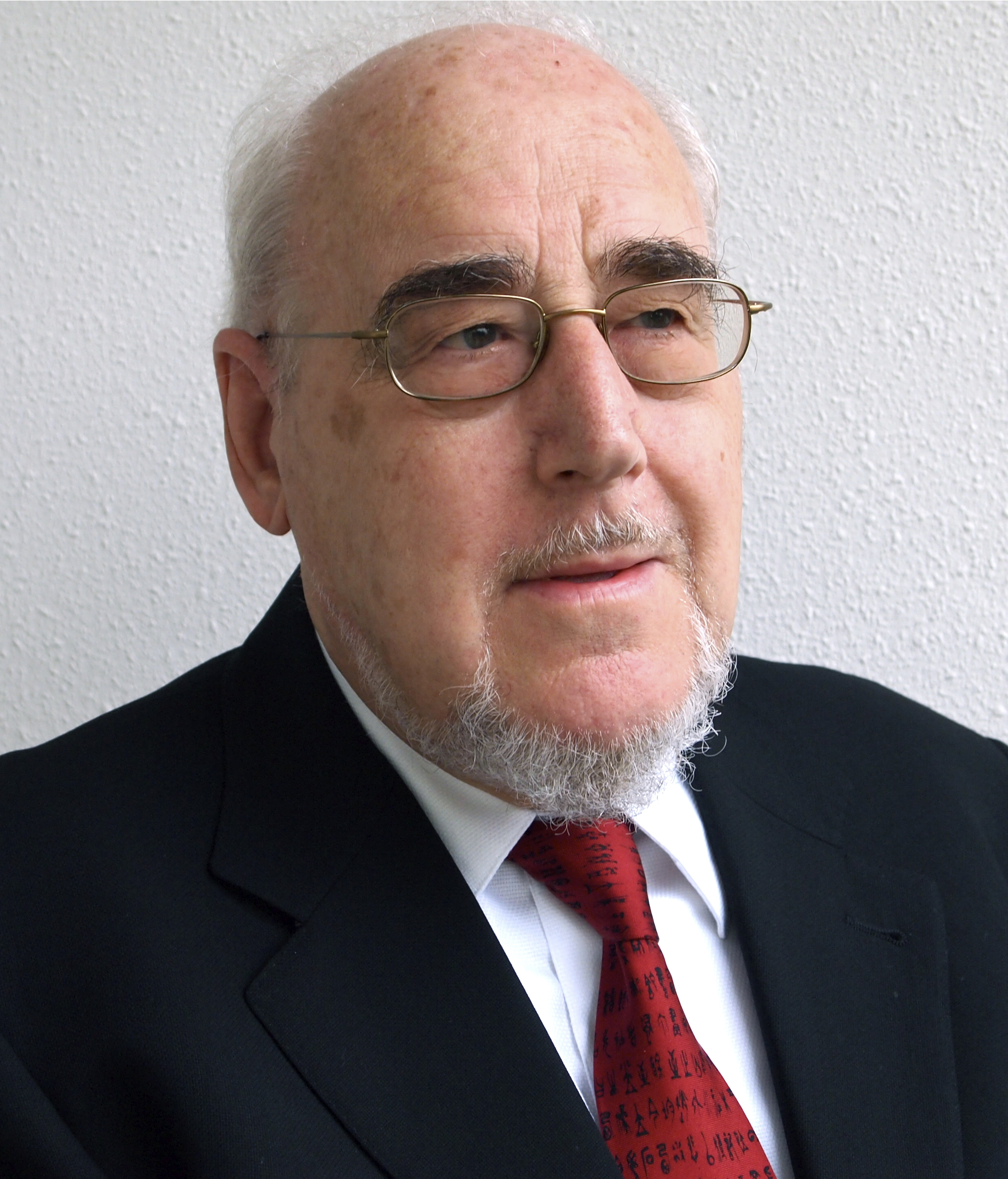
Stanley Gordon Redding

Gordon Redding (20 May 1937 – 17 February 2024) was a British professor, academic, author, editor and consultant. He was a specialist on China and the regional ethnic Chinese, and also worked on the comparison of different systems of capitalism, and on the role of education in societal development. His core interest was in the role of culture in the shaping of societal progress. He has published 15 books and 150 articles related to these subjects. He held a number of professorships, and worked as a Senior Fellow of the HEAD Foundation (Human Capital and Education for Asian Development), based in Singapore. This is a non-profit foundation which he was invited by regional philanthropists to establish in 2010, and initially directed to 2014. He also spent 24 years at the University of Hong Kong, where he founded and directed the HKU Business School (now the Faculty of Business and Economics). For seven years from 1997, he was Director of the Euro-Asia Centre at INSEAD in France. He was also for ten years a Director of the Wharton International Forum, working globally in executive education. From 2013 to 2015, he held a Visiting Professorial Fellowship at the UCL Institute of Education.

== Early life ==
Gordon Redding was born in Bootle, Lancashire, England, the son of Leslie Redding and Georgina Redding (née Mitchell). He also had a sister, Lesley. He was educated at Bootle Grammar School, and attended the University of Cambridge, where he read Economic Geography at Fitzwilliam College. He also held a doctorate from Manchester Business School and an honorary doctorate from the Stockholm School of Economics.

== Career ==
=== Professional career ===
After university and national service, Redding started work in the retail industry in the UK, as an executive for the department store group Owen Owen Ltd. After a decade of managerial experience, mostly in general management of stores, he took three years to do doctoral research in organisation theory at Manchester Business School, under the supervision of Prof Richard Whitley. He then relocated to Hong Kong, allowing him to research extensively in Asia. He spent 24 years at the University of Hong Kong, where he founded and directed the Business School, now the Faculty of Business and Economics. He also founded and directed the Poon Kam Kai Institute of Management at HKU in the field of executive education.

He also served as a consultant on executive development, strategy and organisation for large organisations, including HSBC, Cathay Pacific, Hutchison Whampoa, Mandarin Oriental Hotel Group, Bank Mandiri, BHP, Daimler Chrysler, Christie's and a number of Asian regional conglomerates such as Hutchison Whampoa.

His consultancy also included work on university governance for the University of Hong Kong, Australian National University, and Monash University.

While serving as Director of the Euro-Asia Centre of INSEAD in France, he developed its research into China with his book The Spirit of Chinese Capitalism. For two decades earlier, he had been honorary Secretary of the Association of Deans of Southeast Asian Graduate Schools of Management. His work has also included membership on the editorial boards of ten research journals. He was also a regular guest lecturer for several universities on programmes for both MBA and MEd degrees, and for executives. He addresses conferences regularly and collaborates in research with colleagues in Europe, Asia, and North America. His career included guest faculty membership at the Wharton School, Duke University, Columbia University, University of Southern California, Australian National University, Stockholm School of Economics, University of Hawaii, University of Zurich, Xiamen University and Zhejiang University.

In 1987, he spent a sabbatical year in Boston, based at the Institute for the Study of Economic Culture at Boston University, working with Prof Peter Berger, and writing The Spirit of Chinese Capitalism, enjoying also a visiting fellowship at the Harvard Fairbank Centre.

He addressed conferences at the John F. Kennedy School of Government at Harvard, Manchester Business School, University of Stockholm, Institut d'Études Politiques de Paris (also known as Science-Po), the University of Oxford, among others. He was an Emeritus Professor at the University of Hong Kong, and was awarded an honorary doctorate from the Stockholm School of Economics for services to the school in the teaching and research of Asian business. He has held a Conjoint Professorship at University of Newcastle, Australia, and a Visiting Professorial Fellowship at the Institute of Education, UCL, London.

In 2006, he received the biennial Award for Distinguished Scholarship of the International Association for Chinese Management Research.

=== Academic career ===
Following his doctorate at the Manchester Business School and spending 10 years working in the retail industry, he moved to Hong Kong where he furthered his specialisation in the field of comparative management, and conducted research on societal systems of capitalism, with a focus on the role of culture, religion and social capital on the economy.

His main theory work was on Chinese management, notably in The Spirit of Chinese Capitalism (1990. de Gruyter), and (with Michael Witt) The Future of Chinese Capitalism (2007, Oxford University Press). His later work was on the comparison of different systems of capitalism, and in the societal processes such as education that affect success and failure in supporting a country's progress, and included a book, The Orchestration of Societal Progress (Oxford University Press). He has published ten more books and approximately 150 academic articles. His most recent books include The Hidden Form of Capital (edited with Peter Berger) Anthem Press, The Oxford Handbook of Asian Business Systems (edited with Michael Witt) 2014, and The Oxford Handbook of Higher Education Systems and University Management (edited with Anthony Drew and Steven Crump). His most significant theory papers have been "The thick description and comparison of societal systems of capitalism" (Journal of International Business Studies, 2005), and "Impact of China's invisible societal forces on its intended evolution" in A Lewin, M.Kenney and J P Murmann (eds) China's Innovation Challenge, Cambridge University Press, 2016. Other representative works are "Separating culture from institutions: the use of semantic spaces as a conceptual domain and the case of China" (Management and Organization Review, 4,2, 2008), and, with Max Boisot and John Child "Working the system: toward a theory of cultural and institutional competence" (International Studies in Management and Organization 41,1, 2011).

== Personal life ==
Redding had two sons from his first marriage – Philip (born 1965), and Peter (born 1967) – and six grandchildren. His wife of 33 years is author and journalist Laura Lam, and they had a son, Thurstan (born August 1992). At Redding's death, the family was based in London.

Redding died on 17 February 2024, at the age of 86.

== Selected publications ==
- Redding, G., A. Drew, and S. Crump (eds) (2019) The Oxford Handbook of Higher Education Systems and University Management, Oxford, Oxford University Press.
- Redding G (2017) 'Critical thinking, university autonomy, and societal progress: thoughts on a research agenda', Working paper No.11, January, Centre for Global Higher Education, Institute of Higher Education, UCL. (in press Higher Education Quarterly).
- Witt, M.A. and G. Redding (eds) (2014) The Oxford Handbook of Asian Business Systems, Oxford, Oxford University Press.
- Redding, G. and Peter Ping Li (2013) "Social Capital in Asia: Its Dual Nature and Function" in The Oxford Handbook of Asian Business Systems, Oxford, Oxford University Press.
- Boisot M., J. Child and G. Redding (2011) 'Working the system: towards a theory of cultural and institutional competence', International Studies in Management and Organization, 41:1, 63–96.
- Redding, G. (2010) 'The business systems of Asia', in H. Hasegawa and C. Noronha (eds) Asian Business and Management, London, Palgrave Macmillan. 7–30.
- Berger Peter L. and G. Redding (eds) (2010) The Hidden Form of Capital: the Spiritual Contribution to Prosperity, London, Anthem Press.
- Redding, G. (2008) 'Separating culture from institutions: the use of semantic spaces as a conceptual domain and the case of China'. Management and Organization Review, 4:2, 257–289.
- Redding, G. and M.A. Witt (2007) The Future of Chinese Capitalism, Oxford University Press
- Redding, G, (2005) 'The thick description and comparison of societal systems of capitalism', Journal of International Business Studies, 36, 123–155.
- Redding, G. (1993) The Spirit of Chinese Capitalism, New York, de Gruyter.
