= Diocese of Bristol =

Diocese of the Church of England

Coordinates: 51°27′06″N 2°36′03″W

Diocese of Bristol Dioecesis Bristoliensis
- Coat of arms

- Flag

Location
- Ecclesiastical province: Canterbury
- Archdeaconries: Bristol, Malmesbury

Statistics
- Parishes: 167
- Churches: 207

Information
- Denomination: Church of England
- Established: 1897
- Cathedral: Bristol Cathedral
- Language: English

Current leadership
- Bishop: Bishop of Bristol (vacant; acting: the Bishop of Swindon)
- Suffragan: Neil Warwick, Bishop of Swindon
- Archdeacons: Christopher Bryan, Archdeacon of Malmesbury; Becky Waring, Archdeacon of Bristol

Website
- www.bristol.anglican.org

The Diocese of Bristol is an ecclesiastical jurisdiction or diocese of the Church of England in the Province of Canterbury, England. It is based in the city of Bristol and covers parts of South Gloucestershire and parts of north Wiltshire, as far east as Swindon. The diocese is headed by the Bishop of Bristol and the Episcopal seat is located at the Cathedral Church of the Holy and Undivided Trinity, commonly known as Bristol Cathedral.

== History ==
Until the Reformation, Bristol, along with the rest of Gloucestershire, was part of the medieval Diocese of Worcester. Under the Suffragan Bishops Act 1534, Henry Holbeach was appointed the only suffragan bishop of Bristol in 1538 and assisted the Bishop of Worcester in overseeing the medieval diocese. Nearly two years later, Bristol became part of the newly formed Diocese of Gloucester in 1541. The following year, the Diocese of Bristol was established on 4 June 1542 and consisted of the city of Bristol together with the county of Dorset (two areas not at all contiguous).

Coat of arms of the Diocese of Gloucester and Bristol, consisting of the diocesan arms of Bristol impaling the diocesan arms of Gloucester

The Diocese of Bristol continued until 5 October 1836 when Dorset was annexed to the Diocese of Salisbury and the remainder, the city of Bristol, formed part of the Diocese of Gloucester and Bristol. After sixty years, the Diocese of Bristol was "reconstituted" on 9 July 1897, but with different boundaries. Most of the historic records of the diocese are held by Bristol Archives.

== Organisation ==
=== Bishops ===
Viv Faull was the most recent diocesan Bishop of Bristol from the confirmation of her election on 25 June 2018 until her retirement on 1 September 2025. In the vacancy, the Bishop of Swindon is acting diocesan bishop.

The diocesan bishop is assisted by a Bishop suffragan of Swindon (Neil Warwick). The provincial episcopal visitors (for parishes in the diocese who reject the ministry of priests who are women) are the Bishop of Ebbsfleet and the Bishop of Oswestry, who are licensed as honorary assistant bishop of the diocese in order to facilitate their work there.

=== Archdeaconries and deaneries ===
The diocese is divided into two archdeaconries, each of which is further divided into deaneries (groups of parishes).

Diocese	Archdeaconries	Rural Deaneries
Diocese of Bristol	Archdeaconry of Bristol	Deanery of Bristol South
Diocese of Bristol	Archdeaconry of Bristol	Deanery of Bristol West
Diocese of Bristol	Archdeaconry of Bristol	City Deanery
Diocese of Bristol	Archdeaconry of Malmesbury	Deanery of Chippenham
Diocese of Bristol	Archdeaconry of Malmesbury	Deanery of Kingswood and South Gloucestershire
Diocese of Bristol	Archdeaconry of Malmesbury	Deanery of North Wiltshire
Diocese of Bristol	Archdeaconry of Malmesbury	Deanery of Swindon

== Churches ==
Bristol Cathedral falls outside the following deanery structure.

=== Archdeaconry of Bristol ===
Deanery of Bristol South: Ashton Gate (St Francis), Bedminster (St Aldhelm), Bedminster Down (St Oswald), Bishopsworth (St Peter), Brislington (St Anne), Brislington (St Christopher), Brislington (St Cuthbert), Brislington (St Luke), Hartcliffe (St Andrew), Hengrove (Christ Church), Knowle (Holy Nativity), Knowle (St Martin), Knowle West (St Barnabas), Redcliffe (St Mary the Virgin), Southville (St Paul's), Stockwood (Christ the Servant), Whitchurch (St Augustine), Whitchurch (St Nicholas), Windmill Hill (St Michael & All Angels), Withywood Church

Deanery of Bristol West: Abbots Leigh (Holy Trinity), Almondsbury (St Mary the Virgin), Alveston (St Helen), Aust (St John), Avonmouth (St Andrew), Clifton (All Saints), Clifton (Christ Church), Compton Greenfield (All Saints), Elberton (St John), Henbury (St Mary the Virgin), Henleaze (St Peter), Lawrence Weston (St Peter), Leigh Woods (St Mary the Virgin), Littleton-on-Severn (St Mary of Malmesbury), Olveston (St Mary the Virgin), Pilning (St Peter), Sea Mills (St Edyth), Shirehampton (St Mary), Southmead (St Stephen), Stoke Bishop (St Mary Magdalene), Westbury-on-Trym (Holy Trinity), Westbury Park (St Alban)

City Deanery: Barton Hill (St Luke), Bishopston (Good Shepherd), Bishopston St Michael & All Angels, Bristol St Aidan, Bristol St Bartholomew with St Andrew, Bristol Christ Church, Bristol St Matthew, Bristol St Nicholas, Bristol SS Philip & Jacob, Bristol St Stephen, Clifton St Paul, Cotham (St Saviour with St Mary), Easton All Hallows, Easton Holy Trinity, Eastville (St Anne), Fishponds All Saints, Fishponds St John, Fishponds St Mary, Horfield Holy Trinity, Horfield St Gregory the Great, Hotwells (Holy Trinity), Lockleaze (St Mary Magdalene), Redland Parish Church, St Paul's (St Agnes), Two Mile Hill (St Michael the Archangel), Whitehall (St Ambrose)

=== Archdeaconry of Malmesbury ===
Deanery of Chippenham: Biddestone (St Nicholas), Bowden Hill (St Anne), Box (St Thomas a Becket), Castle Combe (St Andrew), Chapel Plaister (Pilgrims' Chapel), Chippenham St Andrew, Chippenham St Paul, Chippenham St Peter, Cold Ashton (Holy Trinity), Colerne (St John the Baptist), Corsham (St Bartholomew), Ditteridge (St Christopher), Gastard (St John the Baptist), Grittleton (St Mary the Virgin), Hardenhuish (St Nicholas), Kington St Michael (St Michael), Lacock (St Cyriac), Langley Burrell (St Peter), Littleton Drew (All Saints), Marshfield (St Mary the Virgin), Neston (SS Phillip & James), Nettleton (St Mary the Virgin), North Wraxall (St James), Slaughterford (St Nicholas), Tormarton (St Mary Magdalene), Tytherton Lucas (St Nicholas), West Kington (St Mary the Virgin), West Littleton (St James), Yatton Keynell (St Margaret)

Deanery of Kingswood and South Gloucestershire: Abson (St James the Great), Bitton (St Mary), Bradley Stoke Christ the King, Bradley Stoke Holy Trinity, Coalpit Heath (St Saviour), Downend (Christ Church), Doynton (Holy Trinity), Dyrham (St Peter), Filton (St Peter), Frampton Cotterell (St Peter), Frenchay (St John the Baptist), Hanham (Christ Church), Hanham Abbots (St George), Iron Acton (St James the Less), Kingswood All Souls, Kingswood Ascension, Kingswood Holy Trinity, Longwell Green (All Saints), Mangotsfield (St James), Oldland (St Anne), Patchway (St Chad), Pucklechurch (St Thomas a Becket), Soundwell (St Stephen), Stapleton (Holy Trinity), Stoke Gifford (St Michael), Syston (St Anne), Wapley (St Peter), Warmley (St Barnabas), Westerleigh (St James the Great), Wick (St Bartholomew), Winterbourne (St Michael the Archangel), Winterbourne Down (All Saints), Yate St Mary, Yate St Nicholas

Deanery of North Wiltshire: Alderton (St Giles), Ashley (St James), Ashton Keynes (Holy Cross), Brokenborough (St John the Baptist), Brinkworth (St Michael & All Angels), Charlton (St John the Baptist), Christian Malford (All Saints), Corston (All Saints), Cricklade (St Sampson), Crudwell (All Saints), Dauntsey (St James the Great), Easton Grey Parish Church, Foxley Parish Church, Garsdon (All Saints), Great Somerford (SS Peter & Paul), Hankerton (Holy Cross), Hullavington (St Mary Magdalene), Kington Langley (St Peter), Latton (St John the Baptist), Lea (St Giles), Leigh (All Saints), Little Somerford (St John the Baptist), Luckington (SS Mary & Ethelbert), Malmesbury (SS Peter & Paul), Minety (St Leonard), Norton (All Saints), Oaksey (All Saints), Rodbourne (Holy Rood), Seagry (St Mary the Virgin), Sherston Magna (Holy Cross), Stanton St Quintin (St Giles), Sutton Benger (All Saints), Tytherton Kellaways (St Giles)

Deanery of Swindon: Bishopstone (St Mary the Virgin), Blunsdon (St Andrew), Broad Blunsdon (St Leonard), Hannington (St John the Baptist), Haydon Wick (St John), Highworth (St Michael), Hinton Parva (St Swithun), Lyddington (All Saints), Lydiard Millicent (All Saints), Lydiard Tregoze (St Mary), Purton (St Mary), Rodbourne Cheney (St Mary), Sevenhampton (St James), Shaw (Holy Trinity), South Marston (St Mary Magdalene), Stanton Fitzwarren (St Leonard), Stratton (St Margaret), Swindon All Saints, Swindon St Aldhelm, Swindon St Andrew, Swindon St Augustine of Canterbury, Swindon St Barnabas, Swindon Christ Church, Swindon St John the Baptist, Swindon St Luke, Swindon St Mark, Swindon St Mary, Swindon St Paul, Swindon St Peter, Swindon St Saviour, Swindon St Timothy, Toothill Church, Upper Stratton (St Philip the Deacon), Wanborough (St Andrew), Westlea Church, Wroughton (SS John the Baptist & Helen)
