= Cockbill =

Cockbill is a surname. Notable people with the surname include:

- Charles Cockbill (1888–1965), English cleric
- Jack Cockbill (1880–1944), Australian rules footballer
- John Cockbill (1940–2023), Australian rower
- Ryan Cockbill (born 1990), British sport shooter
