= Harmar =

Harmar may refer to:

== People ==
=== Surname ===
- Fairlie Harmar, Viscountess Harberton
- John Harmar (c. 1555 – 1613), Greek scholar and translator of the 1611 Bible
- John Harmar (philologist) (also Harmer) (c. 1594–1670), English cleric and academic, Regius Professor of Greek at Oxford
- Josiah Harmar (1753–1813), American Army officer of the Revolutionary War

=== Given name ===
- Harmar D. Denny, Jr. (1886–1966), Pilot and US Congressman from Pennsylvania
- Harmar Denny (1794–1852), US Congressman from Pennsylvania

== Places ==
- Fort Harmar
- Harmar, Marietta, Ohio, which includes the fort
- Harmar Township, Pennsylvania

== See also ==
- Harmer, a surname
