= John Harmer =

John Harmer may refer to:

- John Harmer (mayor), mayor of Williamsburg, Virginia, 1737–1738
- John L. Harmer (born 1934), former California politician
- John Harmer (bishop) (1884–1944), Anglican bishop

== See also ==
- John Harmar (c. 1555–1613), English classical scholar
- John Harmar (philologist) (1594?–1670), English cleric and academic
