= Charles Burney (archdeacon of Colchester) =

Anglican archdeacon (1786–1864)

Charles Parr Burney (1786–1864) was an Anglican archdeacon in the middle of the nineteenth century.

The son of Charles Burney (schoolmaster), and grandson of Charles Burney, music historian, Burney was born in Chiswick, educated at Merton College, Oxford. He obtained his BA in 1808, MA 1811, BD and DD in 1822. From 1813 to 1833 he was headmaster of the school his father once ran, at Greenwich.

In 1838 he became the incumbent at Sible Hedingham, and in 1848 at Wickham Bishops. All these Essex parishes are near to each other.

He was Archdeacon of St Albans from 1840 to 1845; and then of Colchester until his death. As Archdeacon of Colchester, he attended the inaugural meeting of the Essex Archaeological Society at Colchester Town Hall in 1852.

He died on 1 November 1864: His son, also called Charles, was Archdeacon of Kingston-upon-Thames from 1879 to 1904.

Church of England titles
Preceded by William Hale	Archdeacon of St Albans; 1840 – 1845	Succeeded by Anthony Grant
Preceded by Herbert Oakeley	Archdeacon of Colchester; 1845 – 1864	Succeeded by William Ady
