= Regius Professor of Greek (Oxford) =

Professorship at the University of Oxford

The Regius Professorship of Greek is a professorship at the University of Oxford in England.

Henry VIII founded the chair by 1541. He established five Regius Professorships in the university (and five corresponding chairs in Cambridge University), the others being the Regius chairs of Divinity, Medicine, Civil Law and Hebrew.

The duties of a professor include:

1. The Regius Professor of Greek shall lecture and give instruction in the history and criticism of the Greek Language and Literature and on the works of classical Greek authors.

2. The professor shall be subject to the General Provisions of the decree concerning the duties of professors and to those Particular Provisions of the same decree which are applicable to this chair.

== List of Regius Professors of Greek ==
- John Harpsfield, ca. 1541–1545
- George Etheridge (or Etherege), 1547–1550
- Giles Lawrence, 1551–1553
- George Etheridge, reinstated, 1553–1559
- Giles Lawrence, reinstated, 1559–1584 or 1585
- John Harmar (or Harmer), 1585–1590
- Henry Cuffe, 1590–1597
- John Perrin, 1597–1615
- John Hales, 1615–1619
- John Harrys, 1619–1622
- John South, 1622–1625
- Henry Stringer, 1625–1650
- John Harmar (or Harmer), 1650–1660
- Joseph Crowther, 1660–1665
- William Levinz, 1665–1698
- Humphrey Hody, 1698–1705
- Thomas Milles, 1705–1707
- Edward Thwaytes, 1707–1711
- Thomas Terry, 1712–1735
- John Fanshawe, 1735–1741
- Thomas Shaw, 1741–1751
- Samuel Dickens, 1751–1763
- William Sharp, 1763–1782
- John Randolph, 1782–1783
- William Jackson, 1783–1811
- Thomas Gaisford, 1811–1855
- Benjamin Jowett, 1855–1893
- Ingram Bywater, 1893–1908
- Gilbert Murray, 1908–1936
- E. R. Dodds, 1936–1960
- Hugh Lloyd-Jones, 1960–1989
- Peter J. Parsons, 1989–2003
- Christopher Pelling, 2003–2015
- Gregory Hutchinson, 2015–2023
- Laura Swift, from 2027

== See also ==
- Regius Professor of Greek (Cambridge)
- Regius Professor of Greek (Dublin)
- List of Professorships at the University of Oxford

== Sources ==
- Oxford Dictionary of National Biography, Oxford University Press, 2004.
- R. W. Chambers, "Life and Works of Nicholas Harpsfield", in The life and death of Sr Thomas Moore, knight, sometymes Lord high Chancellor of England, written in the tyme of Queene Marie by Nicholas Harpsfield, L.D., Oxford: EETS O.S. no. 186, 1932, pp. clxxv–ccxiv, esp. pp. clxxviii–clxxx. Important archival information correcting widely repeated mistaken information about the history of the chair in the 1540s.
- The historical register of the University of Oxford: being a supplement to the Oxford University calendar, with an alphabetical record of University honours and distinctions completed to the end of Trinity term 1888, Oxford: Clarendon Press, 1888, p. 49.
