= William Jackson (bishop) =

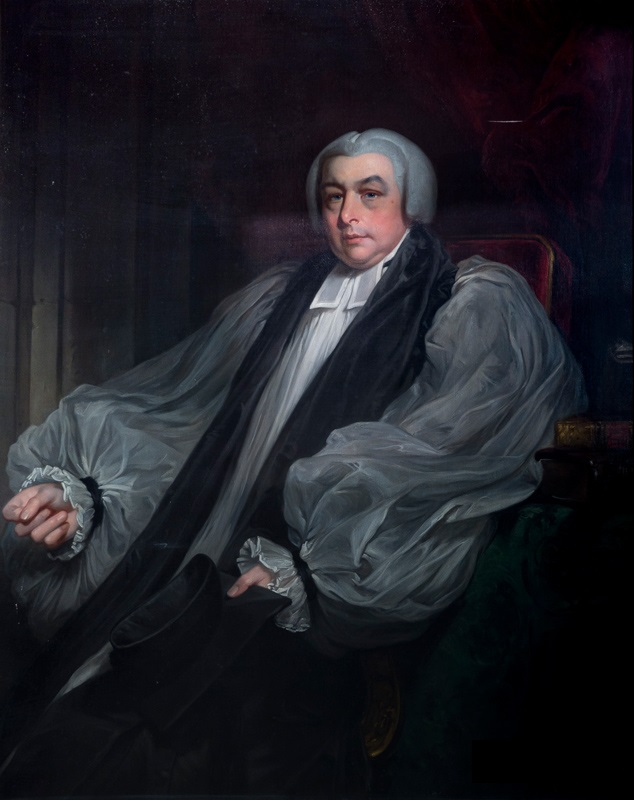
William Jackson, Bishop of Oxford

William Jackson (1751 – 2 December 1815, Cuddesdon) was an Anglican bishop, serving as Bishop of Oxford (as second choice after his elder brother Cyril Jackson refused the post) and Clerk of the Closet.

Jackson was educated at Manchester Grammar School, Westminster School and Christ Church, Oxford (where his tutors included Francis Atterbury). He served as Regius Professor of Greek from 1783 to 1811.

He was a popular, convivial and hospitable man with something of a reputation for hard drinking. Spencer Perceval, the Prime Minister, questioned his suitability on that ground; but the Prince Regent, who was a friend of Jackson's replied that he could see no objection to a Bishop eating well and drinking port.

Academic offices
Preceded by John Randolph	Regius Professor of Greek; 1783–1811	Succeeded by Thomas Gaisford
Church of England titles
Preceded by Charles Moss	Bishop of Oxford; 1812–1815	Succeeded by Edward Legge
Court offices
Preceded by George Pelham	Clerk of the Closet; 1813–1815	Succeeded by Richard Hurd
