= Cyril Jackson (priest) =

Dean of Christ Church, Oxford

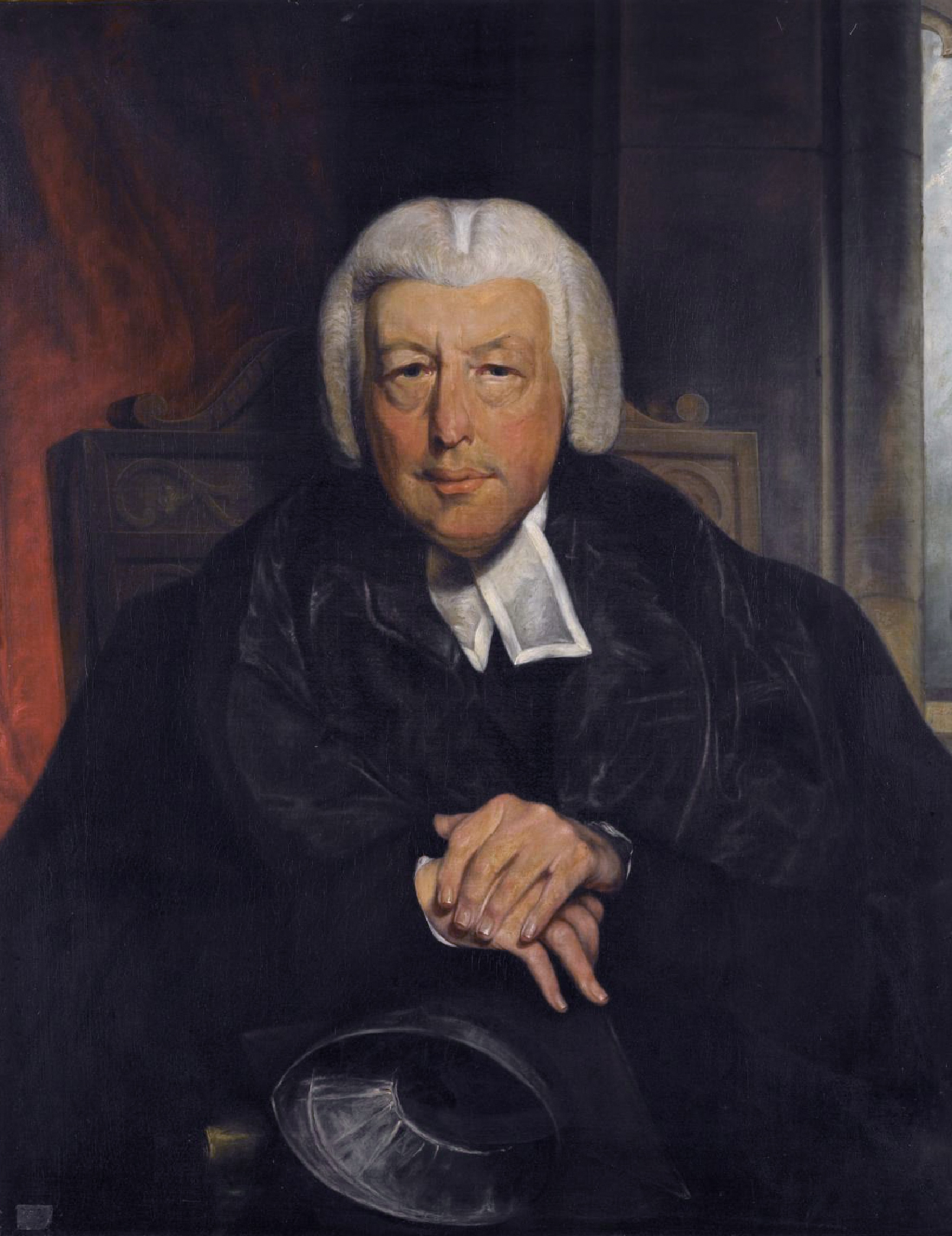
Cyril Jackson

Cyril Jackson (1746–1819) was Dean of Christ Church, Oxford 1783–1809.

Jackson was born in Yorkshire, and educated at Manchester Grammar School, Westminster School and the University of Oxford. In 1771 he was chosen to be sub-preceptor to the two eldest sons of King George III, but in 1776 he was dismissed, probably through some household intrigues. He then took orders, and was appointed in 1779 to the preachership at Lincoln's Inn and to a canonry at Christ Church, Oxford. In 1783 he was elected dean of Christ Church. His devotion to the college led him to decline the Bishopric of Oxford in 1799 (which was instead taken by his younger brother William) and the Primacy of All Ireland in 1800. He took a leading part in framing the statute which, in 1802, launched the system of public examinations at the University of Oxford, but otherwise he was not prominent in university affairs.

On his resignation in 1809 he settled at Felpham, in Sussex, where he remained till his death. He was buried in Felpham churchyard.
