= Philip Davies (disambiguation) =

Philip Davies (born 1972) is a British politician.

Philip Davies may also refer to:

- Philip Davies (cricketer) (1893–1930), English cricketer
- Philip Davies (British Army officer) (born 1932), British general
- Philip R. Davies (1945–2018), biblical scholar
- Philip Davies (priest) (1933–2005), Archdeacon of St Albans
- Philip Davies (architectural historian) (born 1950), heritage and planning consultant
- Phil Davies (politician) (born 1959), British politician
- Phil Davies (rugby union) (born 1963), Welsh rugby union footballer
- Phil Davies (tennis), tennis player from Australia
- Philippe Davies (born 1990), Canadian soccer player
- Phill Davies (born 1981), English rugby union footballer
- W. P. C. Davies (1928–2018), English rugby union player known as Phil Davies

== See also ==
- Philip Davis (disambiguation)
