= Girling =

Girling is a surname. Notable people with the surname include:

- Arthur Girling (1807–1849), English cricketer and umpire
- Barry Girling (1858–1948), Welsh rugby player
- Brian Girling (born 1938), British sports shooter
- Frank Aldous Girling (1898–1966), English farmer, photographer and amateur archaeologist
- Julie Girling (born 1956), British politician
- Mary Girling (1827–1886), English religious leader
- Richard Girling, British journalist
- Sheila Girling (1924–2015), British artist
- William Girling (1882–1973), New Zealand politician

== See also ==
- A car component factory, Girling, named after Albert H. Girling.
