= Harmes =

Harmes is a surname. Notable people with the surname include:

- James Harmes (born 1995), Australian rules footballer
- Suzanne Harmes (born 1986), Dutch gymnast
- Wayne Harmes (born 1960), Australian rules footballer

== See also ==
- Harmer
- Harms
