= Helen Cunliffe =

British Anglican priest

Helen Margaret Cunliffe (born 1954) is a British Anglican priest who was Archdeacon of St Albans from 2003 to 2007.

== Early life and education ==
Cunliffe was born in Derbyshire, educated at Homelands School, Derby and St Hilda's College, Oxford and trained for ordained ministry at Westcott House, Cambridge.

== Ordained ministry ==
Cunliffe was ordained deaconess in 1983, deacon in 1987 and priest in 1994. She worked at the Church of St Mary and All Saints, Chesterfield and the University Church of St Mary the Virgin, Oxford before becoming Chaplain of Nuffield College, Oxford. She was deacon-in-charge of St Paul's Church, Clapham from 1989 and became its first woman vicar in 1994; Cunliffe was a Residentiary Canon (Canon Pastor) of Southwark Cathedral from 1997 to 2002.

== Personal life ==
Her husband, Christopher Cunliffe, was Archdeacon of Derby from 2006 to 2020.

Church of England titles
Preceded by Richard Cheetham	Archdeacon of St Albans; 2003–2007	Succeeded by Jonathan Smith
