= Giles Lawrence =

English Anglican priest

Giles Lawrence, DCL was a scholar and English Anglican priest in the 16th century.

Lawrence was born in Gloucestershire and educated at Corpus Christi College, Oxford. He was admitted to a fellowship at All Souls in 1542. He was appointed Regius Professor of Greek at Oxford in 1548, replacing George Etherege. On the accession of Mary I in 1553, Etherge was restored. During at least part of Mary's reign he was tutor to the children of Sir Arthur Darcy, during which time he assisted in the flight of John Jewel to Germany. He resumed the Regius chair in 1559. He was appointed to the livings of Minety, Wilts. in 1564 and Chalgrove, Oxon. in 1573. Lawrence was Archdeacon of Wilts from 1564 to 1577, Rickmansworth in 1581 and Archdeacon of St Albans from 1581 to 1582. He presumably owed his Wiltshire livings to the good offices of Jewel, who had been consecrated as Bishop of Salisbury in 1560 and whose funeral sermon he preached in 1571.

The date of his death is unknown, but his successor as Regius professor was appointed in March 1585. His only known surviving manuscript is in the collection of Matthew Parker at Corpus Christi College, Cambridge, although he is also known to have been involved in the 1572 revision of the Bishops' Bible. He also contributed couplets in Greek to Thomas Wilson's The Three Orations of Demosthenes (1570).
