= Henry Bagshaw =

Henry Bagshaw may refer to:

- Harry Bagshaw (1859–1927), English cricketer
- Henry Bagshaw (divine) (1632–1709), English divine
