= John Perrin (translator) =

John Perrin (c. 1558 – 1615) was an English churchman and academic, Regius Professor of Greek at Oxford and one of the translators of the Authorised King James Version of the Bible.

== Life ==
From London, he was educated at Merchant Taylors' School and matriculated at St John's College in 1575, aged 17, becoming a fellow of the college in the same year. He graduated with a B.A. in 1579 and with an M.A. in 1583. He proceeded B.D. 1589 and D.D. 1596.

He was Regius Professor of Greek from 1597 to 1615. Nominated to the Second Oxford Company of translators by King James, he found it onerous to continue as Regius Professor, and did not fulfill the duties of the post for a period from January 1605. He became a canon of Christ Church Cathedral in 1604, and vicar of Worthing, Sussex from 1605 to 1611. He died on 9 May 1615.
