= William Este =

English priest

- Archdeacon of St Albans
- Church: Church of England
- Diocese: St Albans
- In office: 1550–1556
- Previous posts: Canon of Windsor; Rector of St Albans living at St Mary Magdalen, Milk Street in the City of London

Personal details
- Born: England
- Education: University of Oxford

William Este was an English priest in the 16th century.

Este was educated at the University of Oxford. A Benedictine, he held the living at St Mary Magdalen, Milk Street in the City of London; was a Canon of Windsor and Rector and Archdeacon of St Albans from 1550 until 1556.
