= Joseph Pott =

English churchman

Joseph Holden Pott (1759–1847) was an English churchman, archdeacon of London from 1813.

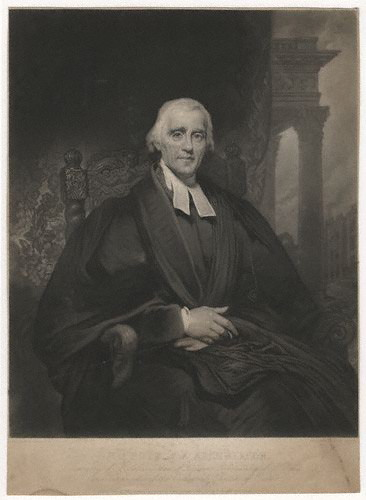
Joseph Holden Pott, 1843 mezzotint by John Porter, after William Owen.

== Life ==
He was one of the nine children of Percivall Pott, the eminent surgeon, and Sarah Cruttenden, and was born in his father's house near St. Bartholomew's Hospital. He was educated at Eton College, and sent at an early age to St John's College, Cambridge. He graduated B.A. in 1780, and proceeded M.A. in 1783. Taking holy orders, he was collated by Bishop Thomas Thurlow to the prebend of Welton-Brinkhall in Lincoln Cathedral, 17 March 1785. In 1787 he became rector of St Olave, Old Jewry with St Martin, Ironmonger Lane. He was appointed archdeacon of St Albans on 8 January 1789.

In 1797 he exchanged his London rectory for the living of Little Burstead, Essex, which he left for the vicarage of Northolt, Middlesex, on 24 February 1806. He next became vicar of St Martin-in-the-Fields, London, 12 December 1812, and exchanged the archdeaconry of St Albans for that of London, 31 December 1813. In 1822 (4 October) he received a canonry in St Paul's Cathedral, and on 13 July 1824 exchanged the vicarage of St. Martin's for that of Kensington. Finally, he became canon and chancellor of Exeter Cathedral, 2 May 1826.

Resigning his archdeaconry and his vicarage in 1842, he held both canonries until his death, which took place on 16 February 1847, at his residence in Woburn Place, Bloomsbury, London. He died unmarried, leaving considerable personal effects and a valuable library, which was sold by auction in May 1847.

== Works ==
At Eton, he dabbled in verse, and up to 1786 four separate works, in verse and prose, appeared from his pen.

Pott assisted John Nichols to some extent in the production of the Literary Anecdotes, and he is mentioned with approval by Mathias in the Pursuits of Literature in the phrase as Gisborne serious, and as Pott devout.

His principal works, besides sermons, controversial tracts, and archidiaconal charges, of which he delivered twenty-six, were:

- Poems, 1779
- Elegies, and Seimane, a Tragedy, 1782
- Essay on Landscape-painting, with Remarks on the different Schools, 1783
- The Tour of Valentine, 1786
- Testimonies of St. Paul concerning Justification, 1846.

== External link ==
- Works by or about Joseph Pott at the Internet Archive
