= Archdeacon of St Albans =

Church of England ecclesiastical office

The Archdeacon of St Albans is an ecclesiastical post in the Church of England Diocese of St Albans in the Province of Canterbury.

== History ==
Before the Dissolution of the Monasteries and Henrican reforms of the 16th century, there were Archdeacons of St Albans from within the Abbey. Registers list archdeacons starting in 1420, but this old "abbey archdeaconry" is supposed to have been created in the reign of Henry III (13th century).

The "diocesan archdeaconry" was newly constituted from St Albans Abbey's parishes in Hertfordshire and Bedfordshire in 1550; it remained a part of the Diocese of London until 1845, when it and was transferred to the diocese of Rochester, at which point its boundaries were made to coincide with those of Hertfordshire. Thirty years later, the archdeaconries of Essex, of Colchester, and of St Albans were taken from the Rochester diocese to create the Diocese of St Albans in 1878. Shortly after the two Essex archdeaconries were erected into the Diocese of Chelmsford in 1914, the St Albans diocese received the ancient county archdeaconry of Bedford from the Diocese of Ely; there has once again been a third archdeaconry since the split on 1 January 1997 of the Hertford archdeaconry from the Archdeaconry of St Albans.

== List of archdeacons ==
=== Medieval ===
From the 13th century, there was an archdeaconry within the Abbey's jurisdiction. These "abbey archdeacons" were monks from the abbey monastery:

- 1415–bef. 1420: John Blebury
- 1420–bef. 1425: John Hatfield
- 1425–bef. 1435: William Alnwick/Alnewyke (possibly the Bishop of Norwich and of Lincoln)
- 1435–bef. 1437: John Peyton
- 1437–bef. 1441: John Hatfield
- 1441–bef. 1446: Stephen London
- 1446–bef. 1450: William Albon
- 1450–bef. 1476: William of Wallingford
- 1476–bef. 1478: Nicholas Boston
- 1478–bef. 1490: John Rothebury
- 1490–bef. 1494: John Thornton
- 1494–bef. 1495: Thomas Newland/Newlonde
- 1495–bef. 1505: Richard Runham
- 1505–bef. 1506: John Stonewell/Stonywell
- 1506: John Killingworth
- 1506–bef. 1509: John Albon
- 1509–bef. 1512: John Mainard/Maynard
- 1512–bef. 1514: Richard Runham
- 1514–bef. 1517: Thomas Marshall
- 1517–bef. 1531: Thomas Kyngesbury
- 1531: Egidius Ferrers
- 1531–bef. 1539: Thomas Kyngesbury
- 1539–1550: William East/Este

=== Early modern ===
On 1 April 1550, letters patent annexed the abbey's parishes to the Diocese of London. Not long after, the diocesan archdeaconry was erected and East (re-)appointed:

- 1550–bef. 1557 (res.): William Este
- 26 February 1557–bef. 1560 (deprived): James Dugdale (deprived)
- 17 July 1560–bef. 1581 (res.): David Kempe
- 3 January 1581–bef. July 1581 (res.): Giles Lawrence
- 5 July 1581–aft. 1602: William Hutchinson
- bef. 1626–bef. 1631 (d.): Thomas Raymond
- 14 November 1631 – 25 June 1644 (d.): Thomas Westfield (in commendam as Bishop of Bristol from 1642)
- 19 December 1660–bef. 1664 (d.): Mark Frank
- 30 June 1664 – 24 April 1671 (d.): Christopher Shute
- 28 April 1671 – 19 July 1683 (d.): William Bell
- 9 August 1683–bef. 1688 (d.): Edward Carter
- 4 June 1688–bef. 1713 (d.): John Cole
- 21 April 1713–September 1715 (d.): Lionel Gatford
- 6 October 1715 – 13 September 1738 (d.): Philip Stubbs
- 14 October 1738 – 1741 (res.): Fifield Allen (afterwards Archdeacon of Middlesex)
- 14 June 1741 – 29 August 1754 (d.): John Cole
- 13 September 1754 – 12 August 1781 (d.): James Ibbetson
- 5 September 1781 – 1788 (res.): Samuel Horsley (afterwards Bishop of St David's)
- 8 January 1789 – 1813 (res.): Joseph Pott (afterwards Archdeacon of London)
- 4 January 1814–bef. 1816 (res.): Robert Hodgson
- 23 January 1816 – 9 June 1839 (d.): John Watson
- 17 June 1839 – 1840 (res.): William Hale (afterwards Archdeacon of Middlesex)
- 16 October 1840 – 28 August 1845 (res.): Charles Burney (afterwards Archdeacon of Colchester)

The archdeaconry, by this point covering all Hertfordshire, was transferred to Rochester diocese by Order in Council on 8 August 1845

- 13 January 1846 – 25 November 1883 (d.): Anthony Grant (also Archdeacon of Rochester, 1863–1882)

=== Late modern ===
- 1884–1909 (res.): Walter Lawrance (also the first Dean of St Albans from 1900)
- 1909–1933 (ret.): Kenneth Gibbs (afterwards archdeacon emeritus)
- 1933–31 December 1935 (d.): Arthur Parnell
- 1936–1942 (res.): Aylmer Skelton (also suffragan Bishop of Bedford from 1939; afterwards Bishop of Lincoln)
- 1942–1951 (res.): Thomas Wood (also suffragan Bishop of Bedford from 1948)
- 1951–1962 (ret.): Charles Cockbill (afterwards archdeacon emeritus)
- 1962–1973 (ret.): Basil Snell (afterwards archdeacon emeritus)
- 1973–1974 (res.): Peter Mumford (afterwards suffragan Bishop of Hertford)
- 1974–1981 (res.): David Farmbrough (afterwards suffragan Bishop of Bedford)
- 1982–1987 (ret.): Edward Norfolk (afterwards archdeacon emeritus)
- 1987–1998 (ret.): Philip Davies (afterwards archdeacon emeritus)
- 1999–2002 (res.): Richard Cheetham (afterwards area Bishop of Kingston)
- 2003–2007 (ret.): Helen Cunliffe (afterwards archdeacon emeritus)
- 2008–2020 (ret.): Jonathan Smith (afterwards archdeacon emeritus)
- 14 March 2020 – 2 February 2023 (res.): Jane Mainwaring (became Bishop of Hertford)
- 20 May 2023 – present: Charles Hudson

== Sources ==
- Madden, Bandinel et al. (1st ed.) & Nichols (2nd ed.). Collectanea Topographica & Genealogica, Vol. VII p. 302
- Hardy & Le Neve: Fasti Ecclesiae Anglicanae: or a calendar of the principal..., Volume 2. pp. 344–345
- Horn, Joyce M. (1969), Fasti Ecclesiae Anglicanae 1541–1857, vol. 1, pp. 14–16
- Horn, Joyce M. (1974), Fasti Ecclesiae Anglicanae 1541–1857, vol. 3, p. 59
