= William Ady =

English Anglican clergyman

The Venerable William Brice Ady (1816 – 21 April 1882) was an English Anglican clergyman who was Archdeacon of Colchester from 1864 until his death.

Ady was born in Stoke Damerel, Devon, to William and Sophia Ady. He was educated at Exeter College, Oxford, earning his B.A. in 1838 with a second class in Classical honours. He was ordained in 1840. From 1857, he was also the Rector at Little Baddow, where he died in 1882.

Church of England titles
Preceded by Charles Burney	Archdeacon of Colchester; 1864–1882	Succeeded by Alfred Blomfield
