= Philip Davis =

Philip Davis or Phil Davis may refer to:

- Phil Davis (fighter) (born 1984), American mixed martial artist and former collegiate wrestler
- Phil Davis (actor) (born 1953), English actor
- Phil Davis (cartoonist) (1906–1964), American illustrator
- Phil Davis (Australian footballer) (born 1990), Australian rules footballer for the Greater Western Sydney Giants
- Philip Davis (Bahamian politician) (born 1951), Prime Minister of the Bahamas since 2021
- Philip Davis (Australian politician) (born 1952)
- Philip J. Davis (1923–2018), American mathematician
- Phil Davis (footballer, born 1944) (1944–1997), retired English professional footballer
- Philip Davis, Library of America editor for Bernard Malamud volumes
- Percy Davis (Kent cricketer) (1922–2018), who was known as Philip Davis in later life
- Philip A. Davis, astronomer and planetary geologist with the U.S. Geological Survey. Minor planet 4448 Phildavis named after him.
- Phil Davis, fictional musical showman played by actor Danny Kaye in the 1954 film White Christmas

== See also ==
- Philip Davies (disambiguation)
