= Charles Lloyd (bishop) =

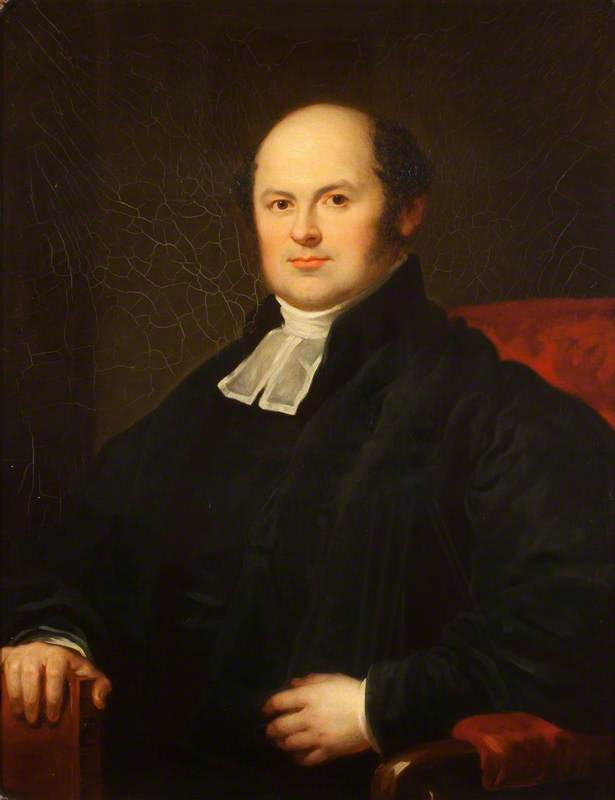
Bishop Lloyd by Benjamin Rawlinson Faulkner.

Charles Lloyd (26 September 1784 – 31 May 1829), Regius Professor of Divinity and Bishop of Oxford from 1827 to 1829, was born in West Wycombe, Buckinghamshire on 26 September 1784, the second son of Thomas Lloyd and grandson of Nathaniel Ryder, 1st Baron Harrowby. Thomas, a 'clergyman and schoolmaster', was Rector of Aston-sub-Edge in Gloucestershire and ran a school at Great Missenden. Charles went to Eton, his education being paid for by scholarships. He was evidently a considerable scholar, achieving a first at Christ Church, Oxford in 1806 (proceeding to MA in 1809), a BD in 1818 and a DD in 1821. Eventually, he had to leave and took a job as a tutor to Lord Elgin's children at Dunfermline. This did not last long as he was asked to return to Oxford to teach mathematics. One of his first jobs was to prepare Robert Peel for his exams. Peel later became prime minister, and remained a lifelong friend of Lloyd. Charles Lloyd soon gained a reputation as an effective teacher.

Ordained in 1808, Lloyd held the curacies of Drayton (1810) and Binsey (1818), both near Oxford. In June 1819 he was appointed under Peel's influence to the preachership of Lincoln's Inn, which he held until February 1822 when, on the nomination of Lord Liverpool, he was appointed to the Regius Professorship of Divinity at Oxford, to which was attached a canonry at Christ Church and the rectory of Ewelme. On 15 August 1822, he married Mary Harriet (died 1857), and within four years they had a family of one son and three daughters.

As Regius Professor, Lloyd revived theological studies in the university. He supplemented his statutory public lectures with private classes attended by graduates, who included Richard Hurrell Froude, John Henry Newman, Frederick Oakeley, and Edward Bouverie Pusey (it was on Lloyd's suggestion that Pusey went to Germany to study its theology). These are figures who became prominent in what was known as the Oxford Movement, which did so much to revitalise the worship and witness of the Church. Lloyd is noted for an 1827 pocket edition of the Greek New Testament incorporating the Eusebian canons.

Lloyd's studies of the ancient roots and historical development of the Anglican liturgy and dogma influenced a generation of Oxford theologians. Short, stocky, and prematurely bald, Lloyd was remembered for informally bantering with, and occasionally bullying, the attendees at his private lectures. For a wider clerical readership he published a collection of Formularies of Faith Put Forth by Authority during the Reign of Henry VIII (1825).

On 4 March 1827, he was consecrated as the Bishop of Oxford, a position he longed for and lobbied hard for, imploring his former pupil Robert Peel, now Home Secretary, to use his influence with Lord Liverpool. Lloyd remained a professor at the university and set about reforming the diocese. There was a particular problem with pluralism and non-residence at the time. It was common for clergy to hold several posts and to 'subcontract' their duties to a poorly paid curate. He was also involved in the contentious legislation for Catholic emancipation, finally passed in 1829. During the Lords' debates on emancipation he delivered an important speech in favour of reform (2 April 1829), a stand which made him a favourite scapegoat of defeated conservatives. Shortly afterwards George IV snubbed him at a public function.

His hard work inevitably took its toll on his health. Mentally distressed and physically fatigued, Lloyd attended an anniversary dinner at the Royal Academy at Somerset House, where he caught a cold that lingered and worsened. He died of pneumonia on 31 May 1829 at the house in Whitehall Place, London, which he had rented for the summer season. Two days later he was given a private funeral in Lincoln's Inn chapel, and was interred in the Benchers' vault.

John Henry Newman wrote warmly of his friend and former tutor when he said, 'He brought me forward, made me known, spoke well of me, and gave me confidence in myself'.

A monument to his memory in Oxford Cathedral was sculpted by Joseph Theakston.

Academic offices
Preceded by Frodsham Hodson	Regius Professor of Divinity at Oxford; 1822—1829	Succeeded by Edward Burton
Church of England titles
Preceded by Edward Legge	Bishop of Oxford; 1827–1829	Succeeded by Richard Bagot
