= Edward Norfolk =

The Ven. Edward Matheson Norfolk, BA (29 September 1921 – 22 July 2017) was the Archdeacon of St Albans in the Church of England from 1982 until 1987.

Although of service age, Norfolk did not serve in World War II. Norfolk was educated at Latymer Upper School and the University of Leeds. He was ordained in 1947 and began his career with curacies at Holy Cross, Greenford, King Charles the Martyr, South Mymms and St James and St Paul, Bushey. He held incumbencies at Waltham Cross, Welwyn Garden City, Great Berkhamsted and King's Langley before his years as an Archdeacon.

Church of England titles
Preceded by David Farmbrough	Archdeacon of St Albans; 1982–1987	Succeeded by Philip Davies
