= Edward Legge (bishop) =

English churchman and academic

The Right Reverend and Honourable Edward Legge
- Bishop of Oxford
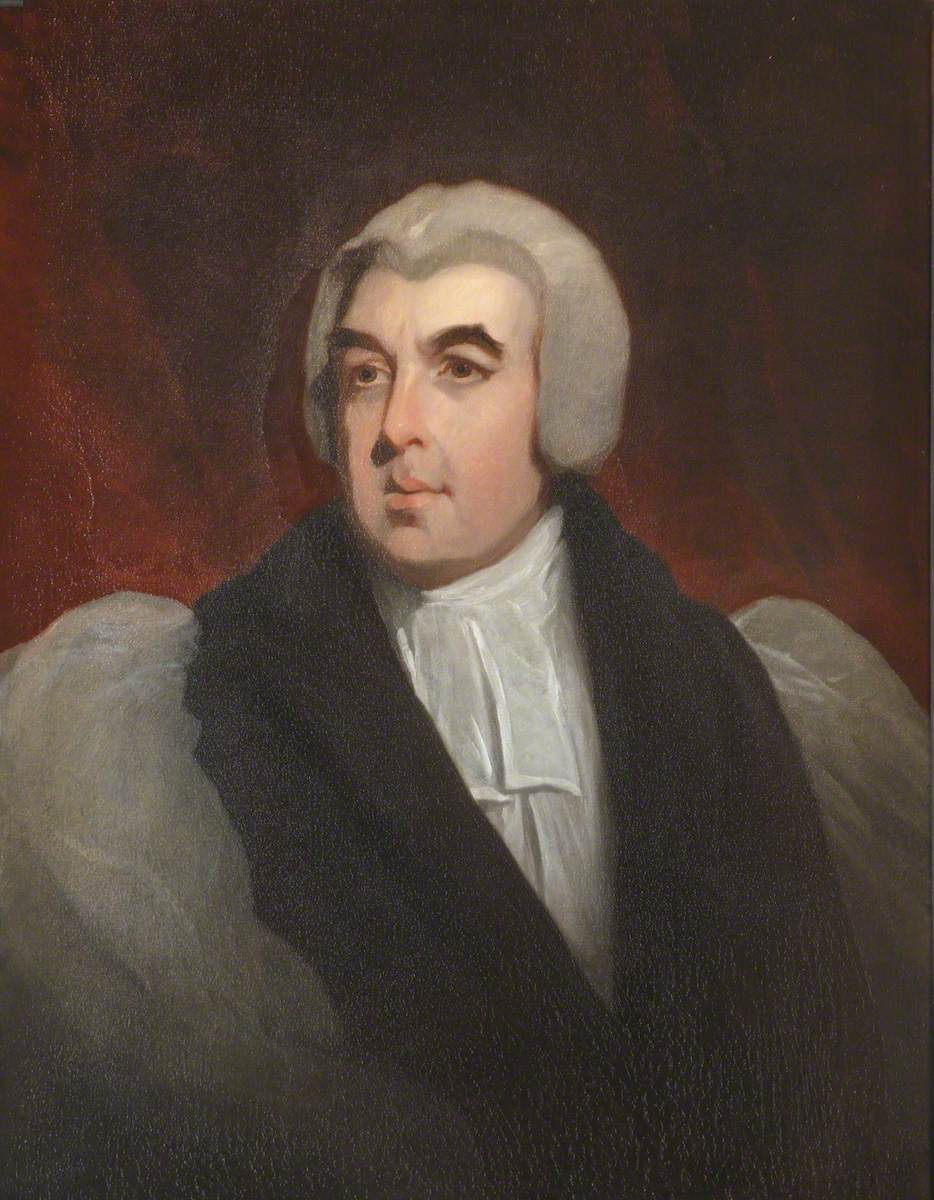
- Portrait by John Partridge
- Church: Church of England
- See: Oxford
- In office: 1816–1827 (death)
- Predecessor: William Jackson
- Successor: Charles Lloyd
- Other post: Dean of Windsor (1805–1816)

Personal details
- Born: 18 December 1767
- Died: 27 January 1827 (aged 59)
- Education: Rugby School
- Alma mater: Christ Church, Oxford

Edward Legge (18 December 1767 – 27 January 1827) was an English churchman and academic. He was the Bishop of Oxford from 1816 and Warden of All Souls College, Oxford, from 1817.

== Life ==
He was the seventh son of William Legge, 2nd Earl of Dartmouth and Frances Catherine Nicoll. Educated at Rugby School, he matriculated at Christ Church, Oxford in 1784, and became a Fellow of All Souls College, Oxford in 1789.

He was vicar of Lewisham from 1797, and a canon of Stall XI at Canterbury Cathedral from 1797 to 1802 following which he served as a Canon of the Twelfth Stall in St George's Chapel, Windsor from 1802 to 1805. He was a royal chaplain from 1797 and Deputy Clerk of the Closet from 1803, resigning the position when made Dean of Windsor in 1805.

He was Dean of Windsor until 1816, when he was raised to the episcopacy as Bishop of Oxford. He was also appointed Warden of All Souls College in 1817, holding both positions until his death in 1827.

Church of England titles
| Preceded by Charles Manners-Sutton | Dean of Windsor & Dean of Wolverhampton; 1805–1816 | Succeeded by Henry Hobart |
| Preceded by William Jackson | Bishop of Oxford; 1816–1827 | Succeeded by Charles Lloyd |
