= Essex Society for Archaeology and History =

UK learned society (1852-)

- Founded: 14 December 1852; 172 years ago
- Headquarters: Essex, U.K.

The Essex Society for Archaeology and History is an organization that collects, studies and publishes information on the archaeology and history of the English county of Essex, including areas that since 1965 have belonged to the London boroughs of Barking and Dagenham, Havering, Newham, Redbridge and Waltham Forest.

It was founded in 1852 as the Essex Archaeological Society and adopted its present name in 1985.

== History and activities ==
The Essex Archaeological Society was founded ‘’for the purposes of reading papers, exhibiting antiquities, discussions, etc.’’, on 14 December 1852. The meeting took place at Colchester Town Hall and was attended by local dignitaries such as John Gurdon Rebow (later M.P. for Colchester) and Archdeacon Charles Burney.

In 1860 the Society established a museum, which is still open to the public, at Colchester Castle to display collections of artefacts donated by its members.

The Society publishes its findings in the Transactions of the Essex Society for Archaeology and History, as well as in occasional papers, an annual journal and regular newsletters. It also organises excursions, lectures and other events for members.

== Notable members ==
- Rev. Charles Parr Burney, clergyman
- Rev. Edward Lewes Cutts, clergyman and writer
- Rev. Francis William Galpin, clergyman and musicologist
- Frank Aldous Girling, farmer and photographer
- John Gurdon Rebow, politician
- Charles Gray Round, politician and magistrate
- J. Horace Round, historian and genealogist
- Rev. Frederick Spurrell, clergyman and archaeologist
