= Stephen Gosson =

16th/17th-century English satirist

Stephen Gosson (April 1554 – 13 February 1624) was an English satirist.

== Biography ==
Gosson was baptized at St George's Church, Canterbury, on 17 April 1554. He entered Corpus Christi College, Oxford in 1572, and on leaving the university in 1576 he went to London. In 1598, Francis Meres in his Palladis Tamia mentions him with Sir Philip Sidney, Edmund Spenser, Abraham Fraunce, and others as the "best for pastorall", but no pastorals of Gosson's are extant. He is said to have been an actor.

After the publication of the Schoole of Abuse, Gosson retired to the country, where he acted as tutor to the sons of a gentleman (Plays Confuted. "To the Reader," 1582). Anthony à Wood places this earlier and assigns the termination of his tutorship indirectly to his animosity against the stage, which apparently wearied his patron of his company. Gosson took holy orders, was made lecturer of the parish church at Stepney (1585), and was presented by Queen Elizabeth I to the rectory of Great Wigborough, Essex, which he exchanged in 1600 for St Botolph's, Bishopsgate.

== Works ==
An anti-theatrical writer, Gosson by his own confession wrote plays, for he speaks of Catiline's Conspiracies as a "Pig of mine own Sowe." Because of their moral standpoint, he excludes such plays as these from the general condemnation of stage plays in his Schoole of Abuse, containing a pleasant invective against Poets, Pipers, Plaiers, Jesters and such like Caterpillars of the Commonwealth (1579).

The euphuistic style of this pamphlet and its ostentatious display of learning were in the taste of the time, and do not necessarily imply insincerity. Gosson justified his attack on the grounds of the disorder which the love of melodrama and of vulgar comedy was introducing into the social life of London. Edmund Spenser, in his Teares of the Muses (1591), laments the same evils, if only in general terms. The tract was dedicated to Sir Philip Sidney, who seems to have resented being connected with it. Edmund Spenser wrote to Gabriel Harvey (16 October 1579) of the dedication that the author "was for hys labor scorned." Gosson dedicated, however, a second tract, The Ephemerides of Phialo ... and A Short Apologie of the Schoole of Abuse, to Sidney on 28 October 1579.

Gosson's attack on poets seems to have had a large share in inducing Sidney to write his Apologie for Poetrie, which probably dates from 1581. The publication of his polemic provoked many retorts, the most formidable of which was Thomas Lodge's Defence of Playes (1580). The players themselves retaliated by reviving Gosson's own plays. Gosson replied to his various opponents in 1582 by his Playes Confuted in Five Actions, dedicated to Sir Francis Walsingham. Pleasant Quippes for Upstart New-fangled Gentlewomen (1595), a coarse satiric poem, is also ascribed to Gosson.

The Schoole of Abuse and Apologie were edited (1868) by Edward Arber in his English Reprints. Two poems of Gosson's are included.
