= Arthur Parnell =

Arthur Henry Parnell (20 March 1861 – 31 December 1935) was an Anglican priest.

Parnell was born in Bow, London to Rev. Richard Chamberlain Parnell and Mary Ann Parnell. He was educated at Merton College, Oxford, and ordained in 1886. He was Vicar of Abbots Langley from 1893 to 1924; and Rector of Aspley Guise from then until 1928. He was Archdeacon of Bedford from 1924 to 1933, and Archdeacon of St Albans from 1933 until his death. Parnell Road in Bow is named after him.

Church of England titles
Preceded by Noel Hodges	Archdeacon of Bedford; 1924–1933	Succeeded by Gerard Lander
Preceded by Kenneth Gibbs	Archdeacon of St Albans; 1933–1935	Succeeded by Lumsden Barkway
