= Charles Moss (bishop of Oxford) =

Church of England bishop

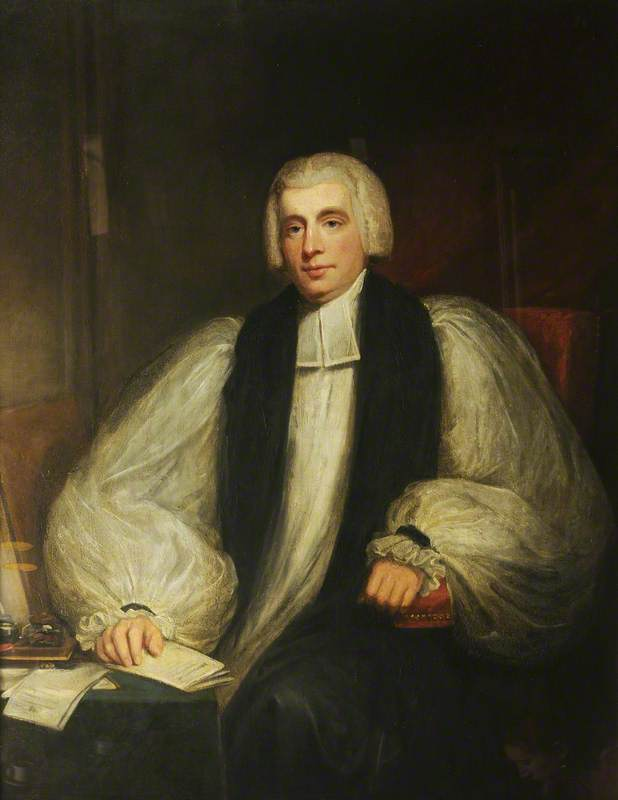
Charles Moss, Bishop of Oxford

Charles Moss (1763 – 16 December 1811) was a Church of England bishop, not to be confused with his father Charles Moss (bishop of Bath and Wells). He served as Bishop of Oxford from 1807 to 1811.

== Life ==
He was educated at Sherborne and graduated from Christ Church, Oxford with a BA in 1783 (where he had got to know Lord Grenville), he was appointed to be a prebend, and precentor in the diocese of Bath and Wells by his father (then its bishop) along with the livings of Wookey and Castle Cary. He then won the chaplaincy of the House of Commons in 1789 via Grenville, who also gained him the nomination to be Bishop of Oxford in 1807. He was also a Canon of Westminster (1792–1797) and Canon of St. Paul's (from 1797). He returned the favor by backing Grenville's campaign to become Chancellor of Oxford University.

Church of England titles
Preceded by John Randolph	Bishop of Oxford; 1807–1811	Succeeded by William Jackson
