= William Hale (priest) =

Archdeacon of London and Master of Charterhouse School (1795–1870)

William Hale Hale (12 September 1795 – 27 November 1870) was an English churchman and author, Archdeacon of London in the Church of England, and Master of Charterhouse.

"In memory of William Hale Hale, late Master of the Charterhouse & Archdeacon of London, who died Advent Sunday, 1870." -Fly-leaf of a Prayer book of a pupil at Charterhouse School.

== Life ==
He was son of John Hale, a surgeon, of Lynn, Norfolk; his father died when he was about four years old. He became a ward of James Palmer, treasurer of Christ's Hospital, and from 1807 to 1811 went to Charterhouse School. On 9 June 1813 he matriculated at Oriel College, Oxford, and graduated B.A. in 1817, and M.A. in 1820, being placed in the second class in classics and mathematics. He was ordained deacon in December 1818, and served his first curacy under George Gaskin at St Benet Gracechurch in London. In 1821 he was appointed assistant curate to Charles Blomfield at the church of St Botolph Bishopsgate, and when Blomfield became in 1824 the bishop of Chester Hale became his domestic chaplain, a position which he retained on the bishop's translation to London in 1828.

Hale was preacher at Charterhouse from 1823 until his appointment to the mastership in February 1842. He was prebendary of St. Paul's Cathedral from 1829 to 1840, was archdeacon of St Albans from 17 June 1839 till his appointment to the archdeaconry of Middlesex in August 1840, and was then installed on 12 November 1842 archdeacon of London. In 1842 he also became Master of Charterhouse, and from 1847 to 1857 held the vicarage of St Giles Cripplegate.

Hale was a Tory and an opponent of reform. He resisted the passage of the Union of Benefices Bill, under which some of the ancient city churches were pulled down, and the proceeds of the sales of the sites applied to the erection of churches in more populous districts, and the proposed abolition of burials within towns. Bishop Blomfield used to say that ‘he had two archdeacons with different tastes, one (Sinclair) addicted to composition, the other (Hale) to decomposition.’

Hale died at the Master's Lodge, Charterhouse, on 27 November 1870, and was buried in St Paul's Cathedral on 3 December. He had married at Croydon, 13 February 1821, Ann Caroline, only daughter of William Coles, and had issue five sons and three daughters. His wife died 18 January 1866 at Charterhouse, and was buried in St Paul's Cathedral.

== Writings ==
For the Camden Society he edited:

- The Domesday of St. Paul's of the Year 1222; Or, Registrum de Visitatione Maneriorum Per Robertum Desarum, and Other Original Documents (etc.). London: Nichols. 1858. hdl:2027/coo.31924072708260.
- Hale, William Hale (1865). Registrum sive liber irrotularius et consuetudinarius prioratus beatae Mariae Wigorniensis. Camden, o.s. (in Latin). Vol. 91. London: Camden Society. hdl:2027/mdp.39015011264580.
- Account of the executors of Richard bishop of London 1303, and of the executors of Thomas bishop of Exeter 1310. Camden Society. 1874. (with Henry Thomas Ellacombe).

Some Account of the Early History and Foundation of the Hospital of King James, founded at the sole costs and charges of Thomas Sutton, anonymous and privately printed, 1854, was by him, and he also wrote Some Account of the Hospital of King Edward VI, called Christ's Hospital, which went through two editions in 1855. He edited and arranged the Epistles of Joseph Hall, D.D., Bishop of Norwich, 1840, and the volume of Institutiones piæ originally published by H. I., and afterwards ascribed to Bishop Andrewes, 1839.

Together with John Lonsdale he published in 1849 the Four Gospels, with Annotations. His translation of the Pontifical Law on the Subject of the Utensils and Repairs of Churches as set forth by Fabius Alberti was privately printed in 1838. For Edward Smedley's Encyclopædia Metropolitana, 1850, 3rd division, vol. vii., he wrote The History of the Jews from the time of Alexander the Great to the Destruction of Jerusalem by Titus, with other articles.

Hale also published sermons of all kinds, besides charges and addresses on church rates, the offertory, intramural burial, the proceedings of the Liberation Society, and many other topics:

- Proposals for the Extension of the Ministry;
- The Case of Obedience to Rulers in Things Indifferent; and the Power of the Offertory as a Means of Church Extension, briefly considered in a Charge delivered to the Clergy of the Archdeaconry of London, on May 18, 1843.
- Intramural Burial in England not Injurious to the Public Health, its Abolition Injurious to Religion and Morals. A Charge, Addressed to the Clergy of the Archdeaconry of London, May 16, 1855
