= Church of Holy Trinity, Eltham =

- Holy Trinity, Eltham
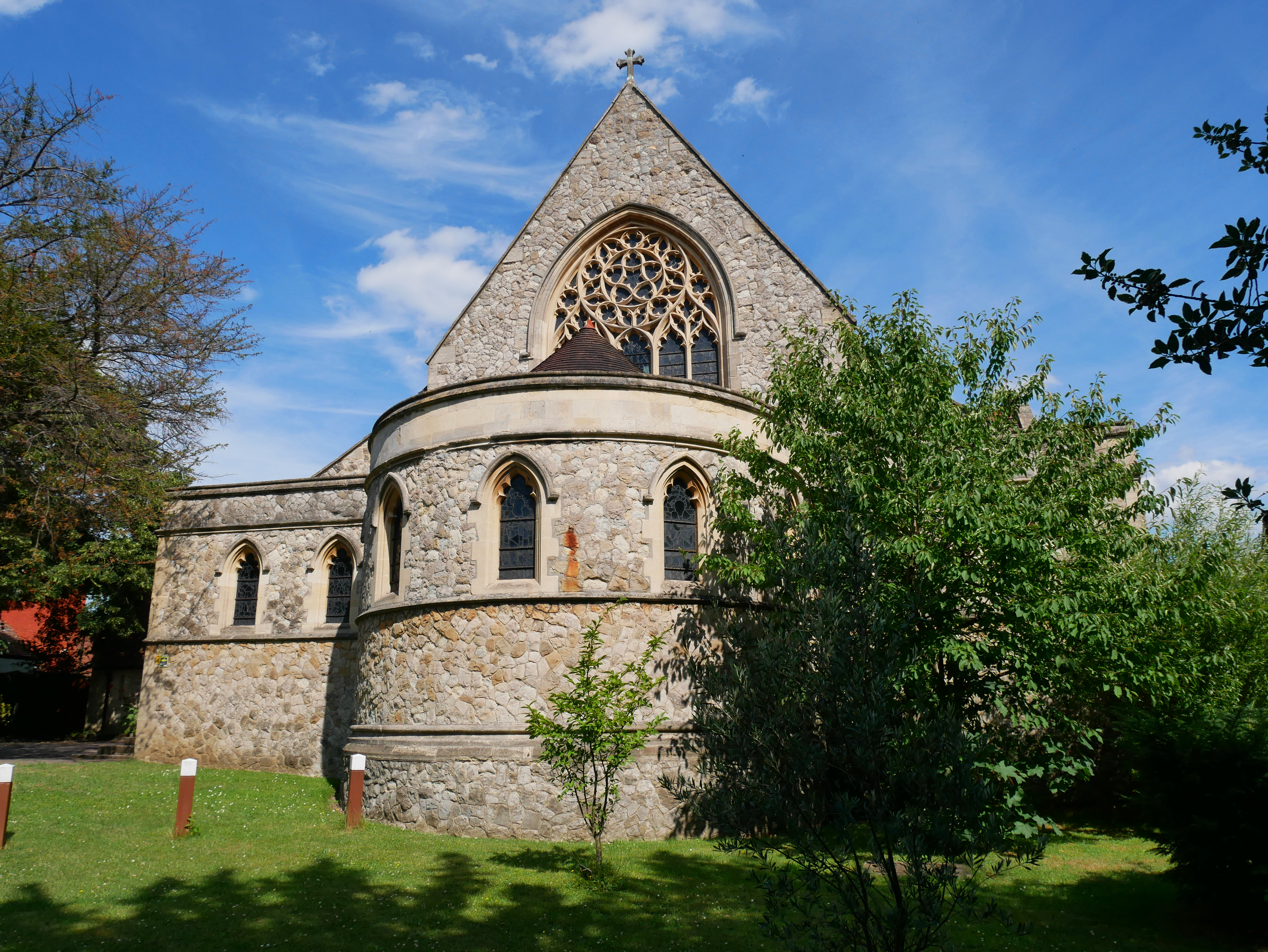
- Church of Holy Trinity, Eltham
- 51°26′54″N 0°03′52″E
- Location: Southend Crescent, Eltham, Greater London, SE9 2SD
- Country: England
- Denomination: Church of England
- Churchmanship: Inclusive Catholic

History
- Status: Active

Architecture
- Functional status: Parish church
- Heritage designation: Grade II listed
- Style: Gothic Revival

Administration
- Diocese: Diocese of Southwark
- Archdeaconry: Archdeaconry of Lewisham & Greenwich
- Deanery: Eltham and Mottingham Deanery
- Parish: Holy Trinity, Eltham

Clergy
- Vicar: Vacancy

The Church of Holy Trinity is a Church of England parish church in Eltham, Royal Borough of Greenwich, London. The church is a grade II listed building. It is the location of the Gallipoli Memorial Chapel, which was dedicated in 1917 to those who had died in the Gallipoli Campaign.

== History ==
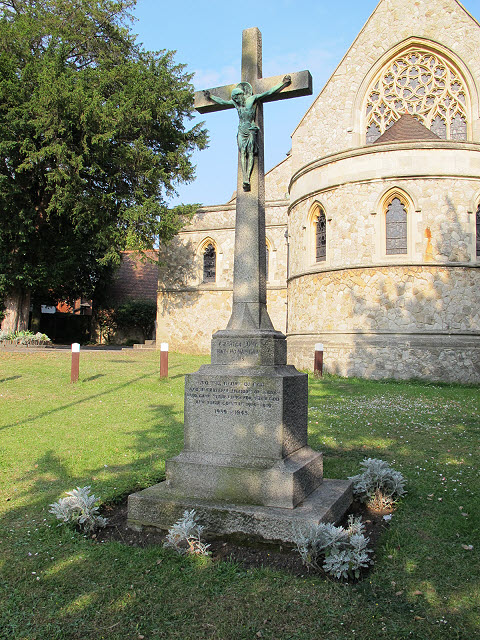
War memorial outside the Church

From 1868 to 1869, the chancel, transepts, and the East bays of the nave were built, having been designed by G. E. Street. In 1908, a vestry, baptistery, and the Western part of the nave were added by Sir Arthur Blomfield and Sons. The church is Gothic Revival in style.

In 1909, Edith Gertrude Latter funded the building of the St Agnes Chapel. It was designed by Sir Arthur Blomfield and Sons, and was decorated by C. E. Kempe and Co. During the First World War, the vicar, Henry Hall, served as a military chaplain with the 29th Division, British Army. They fought in the Gallipoli Campaign, during which Hall was injured and invalided out of the army. Having returned to his parish, the vicar wanted to commemorate those who has lost their lives during the campaign. He converted the St Agnes Chapel into the Gallipoli Memorial Chapel; it was unveiled by General Sir Ian Hamilton on 25 April 1917.

On 8 June 1973, the church was designated a grade II listed building.

== Present day ==
The parish of Holy Trinity, Eltham is located in the Archdeaconry of Lewisham & Greenwich in the Diocese of Southwark.

The parish stands in the Inclusive Catholic tradition of the Church of England. It is a member of Inclusive Church.

== Notable people ==
- Charles Cockbill, assistant curate, later Archdeacon of St Albans
- T. J. Crawford, organist from 1898 to 1899
- Mike Harrison, vicar from 1998 to 2006, later Bishop of Dunwich
- Jeffrey John, vicar from 1991 to 1997, later Dean of St Albans
- Christopher Lowson, vicar from 1983 to 1991, later Bishop of Lincoln
