= William Bell (priest) =

Church of England clergyman, born 1625

William Bell (February 1625 – July 1683) was the Archdeacon of St Albans, a short distance to the north of London, between 1671 and 1683.

== Life ==
Bell was born in February 1625 in central London. He attended Merchant Taylors' School before progressing, in 1643, to St John's College, Oxford. Here he graduated in 1647 and became a fellow of the college. However, Oxford was a bastion of Royalism during the English Civil War which had ravaged the country since 1642, and after they had captured the king in 1647, an increasingly assertive parliament appointed a team of "Visitors" who descended on Oxford and expelled large numbers of academics, including Bell, from their positions.

He is believed to have traveled to the European mainland in 1649, but was back in England by 1655 which was the year in which he was disqualified from a benefice in Norfolk. The Restoration of a (new) king in 1660 ushered in an improvement in the fortunes of William Bell who found himself appointed Chaplain to the Lieutenant of the Tower, a well connected politician called Sir John Robinson. He received a degree in Divinity in 1661 and in 1662 received the incumbency of the important west London parish of St Sepulchre's. This benefice was in the gift of his Oxford college, and his time as priest in charge of the parish was evidently a success. Further promotion followed in 1665 when he was appointed, in addition, a prebendary at nearby St Paul's Cathedral. Two years after that he was made a chaplain to the king. In 1671 he was appointed Archdeacon of St Albans, a post he held for twelve years till his death in July 1683.
