= Anstice Gibbs =

English Girl Guide leader

Dame Anstice Gibbs DCVO CBE
- Dame Anstice Gibbs, 1956
- Born: 2 January 1905; Aldenham, England
- Died: 7 February 1978 (aged 73); Brimpton Common, Berkshire, England
- Occupation: Girl Guide leader
- Father: Kenneth Gibbs

Dame Anstice Gibbs, DCVO, CBE (2 January 1905 – 7 February 1978) was the chief commissioner of the Girl Guides Association in the UK for ten years, and vice-chair of the World Association of Girl Guides and Girl Scouts (WAGGGS) from 1957 to 1960.

== Family and personal life ==
Anstice Rosa Gibbs and her twin brother, Bernard, were born on 2 January 1905 in Aldenham to the Venerable Hon. Kenneth Francis Gibbs, Canon of St. Albans, and Mabel Alice Gibbs née Barnett. Anstice was the youngest of six siblings. The family moved to the Old Rectory, Hatfield, then after her father's death in 1935, to Leicester, briefly, then to Redbourn, Hatfield. By the 1950s Gibbs was living in Oakham, Rutland. From the 1960s until her death, she lived in Brimpton Common, Berkshire. After her death, a service of thanksgiving was held at St Martin-in-the-Fields, London.

== Girl Guides ==
Gibbs spent more than 70 years as part of the Girl Guide movement.

In 1922 she started Guiding in Paris, aged 17. She had one regret: "I was never a Brownie". By 1923 she had been made Lieutenant of 1st Hatfield Guide Company, Hertfordshire, becoming Guider in Charge in 1925. She became district commissioner for Hatfield in 1937, leading local Guiding throughout the Second World War. During the war, she started a Guide Company for evacuated girls, and assisted Rosa Ward, OBE, in raising money to train and equip relief workers who would travel to continental Europe the moment hostilities ceased. In 1943 she was Hertfordshire County's camp advisor, running Guide and Ranger camps.

In 1945 she become the vice-chairman of the Imperial executive committee and in 1947 was one of ten people selected to represent the Girl Guide movement at the wedding of the future Queen Elizabeth II and Prince Philip, Duke of Edinburgh. Others included Lady Cooper (commissioner for overseas Guides), Heather Kay (chief commissioner for Wales), Mrs. Moughton (chief commissioner for Ulster), Winnifred Kydd (director of the World Bureau, from Canada) and Lady Cochrane of Maidstone (chief commissioner for England).

In 1948 she attended the Girl Scout World Conference at the Edith Macy Training School in Mount Pleasant, New York.

She spent 1948 to 1950 in Canada as Lady-in-waiting to the Margaret Alexander, Countess Alexander of Tunis, all the while remaining active within Guiding in Ottawa. She delivered a talk to Guides in which she spoke of the war work that had been done by Guides in the UK. She told listeners how Guides in rural areas had been responsible for meeting and entertaining evacuated children while they were waiting to be collected by their host families, as well as for obtaining childhood necessities such as cots and clothes for the new arrivals. She spoke of England's first air ambulance, which had been purchased with donations collected from Guides throughout the Commonwealth. She spoke also of the Guide International Service, set up in 1942, which was "invaluable as a builder of international friendship among the children of different nationalities" after the war.

Between 1952 and 1960 Gibbs was a member of the committee of WAGGGS and became deputy chief commissioner for international Guiding for the Girl Guide Association in 1954.

She was elected both chief commissioner and chairwoman of the British Commonwealth Girl Guides Association in 1956, holding both roles for a decade. She was elected vice-chair of WAGGGS from 1957 to 1960.

She visited Girl Guides in Sri Lanka, Pakistan and Australia in 1956. The following year she visited the Bharat Scouts and Guides in India and Brazil to attend WAGGGS' 16th World Conference.

In 1959 she was involved in establishing a new Buckingham Palace Brownie pack specifically for Princess Anne to join. The following year Gibbs travelled to Greece for WAGGGS' 17th World Conference.

In 1963 she was elected chair of WAGGGS World Conference. The following year she visited Girl Guides in Australia, New Zealand, Fiji, Papua New Guinea, Malaysia, Singapore, India and Pakistan.

From 1965 onwards Gibbs made regular visits to meet Princess Margaret, the President of the Girl Guide Association.

In 1972 Gibbs was elected chair of the Guide Club. Founded by Dame Joan Marsham, the Guide Club provided residential accommodation for 25 past and present members of the Girl Guide Association.

Gibb's final role in Guiding was as chair of the UK's planning committee for WAGGGS' 22nd World Conference held in Sussex in 1975.

== Other ==
Gibbs was a member of the council of The Victoria League, which promotes friendship education and understanding among the people of the Commonwealth, for ten years, becoming deputy president.

She was Lady-In-Waiting to her friend, Viscountess Alexander of Tunis, wife of the Governor General of Canada. She spent August 1948 – October 1949 and May 1950-51 as her travelling companion around Canada.

== Honours and awards ==
- 1945 – Awarded the Silver Fish, Girl Guiding's highest adult honour, for exceptional service to the Guide movement
- 1960 – Appointed Commander of the Order of the British Empire (CBE) in the 1960 New Year Honours
- 1967 – Appointed Dame Commander of the Royal Victorian Order (DCVO), an award given personally by the Queen, in the 1967 New Year Honours
