= Edward Carter (priest) =

English Anglican clergyman (d. 1688)

Edward Carter (died 1688) was a Church of England priest in the 17th century.

Carter was born in St Albans and educated at Magdalen College, Oxford. He held livings at Ayot St Lawrence and King's Langley He was Archdeacon of St Albans from 1683 until his death in 1688.
