= Brimpton Common =

Coordinates: 51°22′N 1°11′W

- Hamlet
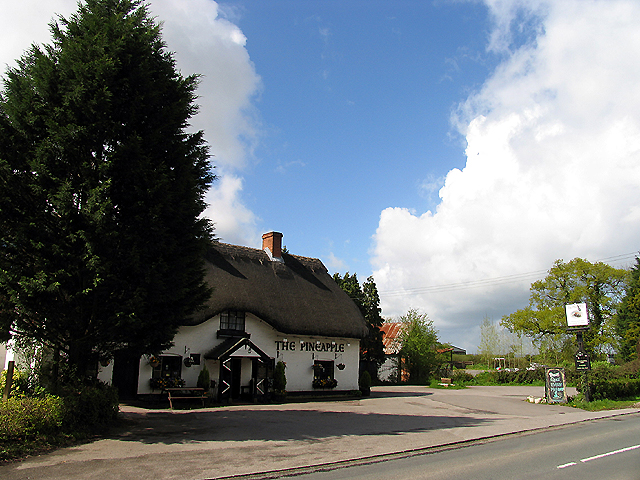
- Brimpton Common Road

- Location within Berkshire
- OS grid reference: SU5663
- Unitary authority: West Berkshire
- Ceremonial county: Berkshire
- Region: South East
- Country: England
- Sovereign state: United Kingdom
- Post town: Reading
- Postcode district: RG7
- Dialling code: 0118
- Police: Thames Valley
- Fire: Royal Berkshire
- Ambulance: South Central
- UK Parliament: Newbury

Brimpton Common is a hamlet in Berkshire, England. It is part of Brimpton Parish, and part of the Benefice of Aldermaston and Woolhampton in the Diocese of Oxford. It is in the Aldermaston Ward of West Berkshire Council.

== Housing ==
It has a population of just under 150. The majority of the housing stock is detached with generous-sized plots. There is a mixture of late 19th century estate and farm-workers' homes (some terraced or semi-detached), plus a post-war ribbon development of larger homes along Brimpton Lane, The Byway and Kingsclere Road.

== History ==
Brimpton Common is the most westerly of a series of former medieval “commons” to the south of three rivers between Newbury and Reading: River Enborne, River Kennet and River Thames, the other commons being Tadley Common, Silchester Common, Mortimer Common, Wokefield Common and Burghfield Common.

== Geology ==
The commons are flat land about 100 metres above sea level and the highest land between the watercourses to north and south. They are the remains of a marine sedimentation laid down in Tertiary times, subsequently raised by the uplift of the land in later geological times. A layer of clay between 0.5 and 1.0 metres thick provided an acidic topsoil on which the native vegetation was pine, heather and associated species. Below this was a bed of gravel, up to 3 metres deep. All of the exploitable gravel in Brimpton Common has now been extracted and the land has been restored to a mixture of agricultural land and fishing lake.

== Business ==
The main local employer is AWE Blacknest, a major centre for international seismological research;

== Amenities ==
There are no shops in Brimpton Common, there is the Lakeside Garden Centre, and The Pineapple public house plus a few small businesses surrounding AWE Blacknest. It was frequently used by shepherds and drovers as an overnight stop. The name is derived from the pine forest that once surrounded the area, a pine apple being a local name for a pine cone. The furniture inside the pub is noteworthy. It was made by a local craftsman using only a chainsaw and chisel and carved from the last of the English elm. For many years up to the 1990s its local worthies included “Cowboy Roy” (who lived in a wild-west mock-up in nearby Haughurst Hill) and Gerry the Poacher, and their portraits once hung on either side of the fireplace in the public bar.

== Notable people ==
There have been notable residents in Brimpton Common:

- Ruth Ellis: the last woman to be hanged in England. Although born in Wales, she grew up in Brimpton Common, just along the road from The Pineapple, and attended Brimpton Primary School. Her family moved to London when she was 15 years old.
- Victor Gollancz, the left-wing publisher owned Lane End in the 1940s and for a number of years it subsequently became the weekend retreat of the then Minister of Health Aneurin Bevan and his wife Jennie Lee.
- Ron Goodwin, British composer and conductor, lived at Blacknest Cottage, Brimpton Common, Berkshire, where he died on 8 January 2003, aged 77. He is buried at St Paul's Churchyard, Ashford Hill, Hampshire.
- Dame Anstice Gibbs DVCO, CBE, the Chief Commissioner of the Girl Guides Association and Vice-Chair of the World Association of the Girl Guides and Girl Scouts lived in Brimpton Common from the 1960s until her death in 1978.
