= Basil Snell =

The Ven. Basil Clark Snell (2 February 1907 – 12 June 1986) was an eminent Anglican priest in the mid twentieth century.

Snell was educated at The King's School, Canterbury and Queens' College, Cambridge. He was ordained in 1933 and began his career with a curacy at St Kentigern's, Crosthwaite. After this he was Chaplain of Aldenham School and then Loretto School. During the war he was a Chaplain to the British Armed Forces. He was Rector of Tattingstone from 1947 to 1955 when he became a Residentiary Canon of St Edmundsbury Cathedral. He was Archdeacon of Bedford from 1958 until 1962 and of St Albans from then to 1973.

Church of England titles
Preceded by Basil Tudor Guy	Archdeacon of Bedford; 1958–1962	Succeeded by John Tyrell Holmes Hare
Preceded by Charles Shipley Cockbill	Archdeacon of St Albans; 1962–1973	Succeeded by Peter Mumford
