= Kenneth Gibbs =

British cleric (1856–1935); Archdeacon of St Albans

The Venerable and Honourable Kenneth Gibbs
- Born: Kenneth Francis Gibbs; 2 April 1856
- Died: 1 February 1935 (aged 78)
- Education: Winchester College and Christ Church, Oxford
- Spouse: Mabel Alice Barnett
- Children: Alan, Leonard, Dorothea, Raymond, Bernard, Anstice, and Andrew
- Parent(s): Hucks Gibbs, 1st Baron Aldenham, and Louisa Anne Adams
- Church: Church of England
- Offices held: Vicar of Aldenham (1884–1913); Archdeacon of St Albans (1909–1935)

Kenneth Francis Gibbs, M.A., D.D. (2 April 1856 – 1 February 1935), was a Church of England clergyman who served as the Archdeacon of St Albans from 1909 until his death in 1935.

He was born on 2 April 1856, the son of Hucks Gibbs, 1st Baron Aldenham, and Louisa Anne Adams. He was educated at Winchester College, Winchester, and followed by graduating from Christ Church, Oxford with Master of Arts (M.A.).

He was appointed vicar of Aldenham, Hertfordshire, in 1884.

On 5 June 1894, he married Mabel Alice Barnett, daughter of Charles Edward Barnett and Augusta Rose Walsh. They had seven children: five sons and two daughters, including Dame Anstice Gibbs, DBE.

He was appointed the Archdeacon of St. Albans in 1909, but continued as Vicar of Aldenham until 1913. He was chaplain to King George V in 1921. He was awarded the honorary degree of Doctor of Divinity (D.D.) by Lambeth degree in 1929.

He died on 1 February 1935 aged 78.

Church of England titles
Preceded by Walter Lawrance	Archdeacon of St Albans; 1909–1933	Succeeded by Arthur Parnell
