= William Hutchinson (archdeacon of Cornwall) =

English clergyman

William Hutchinson was an English priest in the late 16th and early 17th centuries.

Hutchinson was educated at St John's College, Oxford. He held livings at St Mary, Rickmansworth; St Christopher le Stocks, City of London; St. Botolph, Bishopsgate, City of London; All Saints', Hutton; St Michael Bassishaw, City of London; All Saints', Castle Camps; St Mary, Cheriton Bishop; and St Andrew, Kenn. He was Archdeacon of St Albans from 1581 until 1602 and Archdeacon of Cornwall from 1603 until his resignation in 1616. Hutchinson was also appointed a prebendary of St Paul's Cathedral in 1589; and a Canon of Exeter in 1608.
