= John Randolph (bishop of London) =

Church of England bishop (1749–1813)

The Right Reverend and Right Honourable John Randolph
- Bishop of London
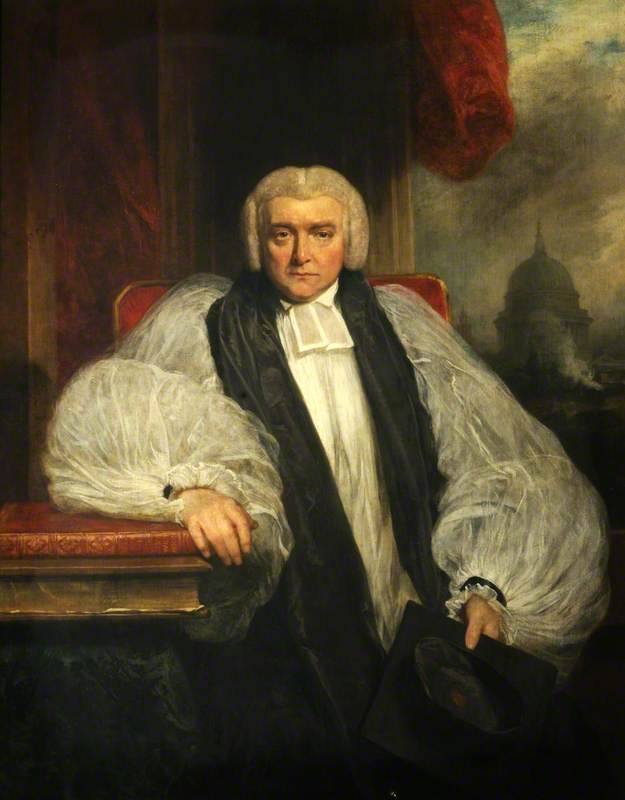
- Portrait by William Owen, 1811
- Church: Church of England
- Diocese: London
- Elected: 1809
- Term ended: 1813 (death)
- Predecessor: Beilby Porteus
- Successor: William Howley
- Other posts: Bishop of Bangor; 1807–1809; Bishop of Oxford; 1799–1807; Regius Professor of Divinity; 1783–1807; Regius Professor of Greek; 1782–1783; Oxford Professor of Poetry; 1776–1782

Orders
- Consecration: c. 1799

Personal details
- Born: 6 July 1749 Much Hadham, Hertfordshire
- Died: 28 July 1813 (aged 64)
- Buried: All Saints Church, Fulham
- Denomination: Anglican
- Residence: Fulham Palace, London
- Parents: Thomas Randolph
- Spouse: Jane Lambard (m. 1785)
- Profession: Scholar & teacher
- Education: Christ Church, Oxford

John Randolph (6 July 1749 – 28 July 1813) was a British scholar, teacher, and cleric who rose to become Bishop of London.

== Early life and academic career ==
He was born in Much Hadham, Hertfordshire, the son of Thomas Randolph, President of Corpus Christi College, Oxford and educated at Westminster School and Christ Church, Oxford. He was awarded BA in 1771, MA in 1774 and BD in 1782.

He was associated with Oxford University as a resident and instructor from 1779 to 1783. In 1776 he was made Professor of Poetry, in 1782 Regius Professor of Greek and in 1783 Regius Professor of Divinity.

== Episcopal career ==
In 1799, Randolph was named the Bishop of Oxford, and in 1807 was translated to the see of the Bishop of Bangor. He retained the post of Regius professor until his move to Bangor. Randolph was not particularly liberal. In debating the expansion of free schools, he noted that educating the poor would "...puff up their tender minds or entice them into a way of life of no benefit to the publick and ensnaring to themselves."

On 12 June 1809, he was made the Bishop of London, and ex officio a member of the Privy Council of the United Kingdom. In December 1811, he was elected a Fellow of the Royal Society.

He died in office in 1813 and was buried in Fulham churchyard. He had married Jane, daughter of Thomas Lambard of Sevenoaks, Kent in 1785; they had six children.

Academic offices
Preceded by Benjamin Wheeler	Regius Professor of Divinity; 1783–1807	Succeeded by Charles Henry Hall
Church of England titles
Preceded by Edward Smallwell	Bishop of Oxford; 1799–1807	Succeeded by Charles Moss
Preceded by William Cleaver	Bishop of Bangor; 1806–1809	Succeeded by Henry Majendie
Preceded by Beilby Porteus	Bishop of London; 1809–1813	Succeeded by William Howley
