= Henry Bagshaw (divine) =

English divine

Henry Bagshaw D.D. (1632–1709), was an English divine.

Bagshaw was the younger son of Edward Bagshaw, treasurer of the Middle Temple. He was born in Broughton, Northamptonshire, in 1632. After attending Westminster School, he was, in 1651, elected student of Christ Church, Oxford, of which he became M.A. in 1657. In 1663 he was appointed chaplain to Sir Richard Fanshaw, ambassador to Spain and Portugal. After Fanshaw's death in 1666, he returned to England, and became chaplain to the Archbishop of York, who made him prebendary of Southwell and rector of Castleton in Synderick.

In August 1667, he was collated to the prebend of Barnaby in York Cathedral, and in 1668 to that of Fridaythorpe. He became B.D. in the same year, and D.D. in 1671. In 1672 he was made chaplain to the Lord Treasurer Danby, and rector of St Botolph-without-Bishopsgate London, which he exchanged for Houghton-le-Spring, Durham. In 1681 he was appointed prebendary of Durham.

He died at Houghton 30 December 1709, and was buried in the chancel of the church there.

== Writings ==
Bagshaw enjoyed a high reputation as a pulpit orator, and he also published:

- Sermon preached in Madrid on the occasion of the Death of Sir R. Fanshaw (1667)
- The Excellency of Primitive Government, in a Sermon(1673)
- A Sermon preached before the King at Whitehall (1676)
- Diatribe, or Discourses upon Select Texts against Papists and Socinians (1680)
