= Frank Aldous Girling =

East Anglian farmer, photographer and expert amateur archaeologist

Frank Aldous Girling, FSA (1898- 1966). was an East Anglian farmer, photographer and expert amateur archaeologist. He provided photographs for several books about East Anglia, including Nikolaus Pevsner's Suffolk, and his photography led to an important discovery of Bronze Age barrows in Essex. He was elected a Fellow of the Society of Antiquaries of London in 1942.

== Personal and early life ==
Frank Girling was born in 1898 at Moverons Farm, Brightlingsea, which was run by his father, Frank Disney Girling, who served as deputy mayor of Brightlingsea in 1897.

In 1917, during the First World War, Girling was drafted into the Territorial Force as an infantryman and served in France.

In 1949 he married Minnie How.

== Farming career ==
When Girling was demobilised in 1920, he returned to farming at Holly Lodge and New House Farm, Little Bromley, Essex, starting as a foreman for his father. He was passionate about farming, which was his life-long occupation, breeding Suffolk black-faced rams and winning prizes for his barley exhibits at the Brewer's Exhibition in London in 1949.

During the Second World War, he was in command of the Bromleys Home Guard and served on the Tendring Hundred War Agricultural Executive Committee.

== Photography and archaeology ==
Girling was extremely interested in the culture, history and archaeology of East Anglia. He was a council member of the Essex Archaeological Society, and both he and his wife Minnie were members of the Suffolk Institute of Archaeology, and in 1942 he became a fellow of the Society of Antiquaries.

Girling had a particular interest in merchants' marks and published a book on them, entitled English Merchants' Marks. His interpretation of Suffolk merchants' marks is mentioned in The Arma Christi in Medieval and Early Modern Material Culture, edited by Andrea Denny Brown and Lisa Cooper. Girling also wrote articles for local archaeological societies on a variety of subjects (see bibliography below).

He photographed the architecture and archaeological artefacts of East Anglia, and his photography led to important archaeological discoveries. In 1957, through his photography, he found a circle in a field of sugar beet in Dedham. This led to the discovery of the existence of Bronze Age barrows, previously thought not to exist in north-east Essex. Bryan Blake excavated the site for Colchester Museum and found Bronze Age collared funerary urns, which were photographed by Girling in 1960.

In his book Suffolk, Nikolaus Pevsner credits Girling for providing his photographic collection of Suffolk for Pevsner's research and for identifying architectural details on various buildings. Girling also provided images for Humphrey Pakington's book, English Villages and Hamlets.

Girling also documented farming through his photography.

== Collections and archives ==
When he died, Girling's Essex photographs were donated to the Essex Society for Archaeology and History and to Colchester Museum, while his photos of Suffolk went to Ipswich Library.

The Conway Library at the Courtauld Institute of Art holds a collection of Girling's photographs. These are currently being digitised as part of a larger digitisation project of the Conway Library.

== Bibliography ==
Girling, F.A., 1939. Pargetting in Suffolk. Suffolk Institute.

Girling, F.A., 1928. Suffolk Timber Framed Houses. Journal of the British Archaeological Association.

Girling, F.A., 1955. Wall Painting in Boxford Church. The Suffolk Institute of Archaeology and History.

Girling, F.A., 1960. Essex Merchants' Marks. Colchester Archaeological Group Annual Bulletin.

Girling, F.A., 1962. English Merchants' Marks: A Field Survey of Marks Made by Merchants and Tradesmen in England Between 1400 and 1700. Lion and Unicorn Press.

Girling, F.A., 1963. Early Sixteenth Century Decorated Bricks at Aspall Hall. The Suffolk Institute of Archaeology and History.

Girling, F.A., 1965 Masons' Marks. The Suffolk Institute of Archaeology and History

Pevsner, N, 1974, 2nd edition. Suffolk. London: Penguin.

Brown, A.D. & Cooper, L. (editors), 2014. The Arma Christi in Medieval and Early Modern Material Culture. Burlington, VT: Ashgate Publishing Company.
