= John Harmar (philologist) =

English cleric and academic

John Harmar (also Harmer) (1594?–1670) was an English cleric and academic, Regius Professor of Greek at Oxford from 1650.

== Life ==
A nephew of John Harmar the scholar, he was born at Churchdown, near Gloucester, about 1594, and was educated at Winchester College. He obtained a demyship at Magdalen College, Oxford, in 1610, at the age of 16; graduated B.A. 15 December 1614, and M. A. 18 June 1617, and took holy orders.

In 1617 Harmar was appointed usher at Magdalen College School; disputes seem to have arisen between him and the head-master, and Peter Heylyn, who was then at the college, notes in his diary that Harmar was a subject of mockery. In 1626 he obtained the mastership of the free school at St. Albans. While he was there the king visited the school, and his pupils recited three orations on the occasion. He held other scholastic offices, among them the under-mastership at Westminster School, and supplicated for the degree of M.B. on 4 July 1632.

In 1650 Harmar was appointed Regius Professor of Greek at Oxford: though his learning was esteemed, he was unpopular as a seeker of patronage. In September 1659 he appears to have been one of the victims of a practical joke; a mock Greek Orthodox patriarch visited the university, and he delivered a solemn Greek oration before him. This imposter was a London merchant named Kynaston, in a prank set up by William Lloyd which also took in Gilbert Ironside the Younger. In 1659, also, through the intervention of Richard Cromwell, he was presented by the university to the donative rectory of Ewhurst, Hampshire. On the Restoration of 1660 he lost both his professorship and his rectory, and retired to Steventon in Berkshire, supported mainly by his wife's jointure.

Harmar died at Steventon on 1 November 1670, and was buried in the churchyard there, partly, at least, at the expense of Nicholas Lloyd the dictionary-maker.

== Works ==
Harmar wrote:

- A translation of the Mirrour of Humility, by Daniel Heinsius, 1618.
- Praxis Grammatica, 1622.
- Eclogae sententiarum e Chrysostomo decerptae, 1622.
- Janua Linguarum, 1626.
- Protomartyr Britannus, 1627, one sheet.
- Lexicon Etymologicon Graecum, junctim cum Scapula, 1637.
- De lue Venerea, doubtful (Anthony Wood).
- Epistola ad D. Lambertum Osbaldestonum, an apology for John Williams, 1649.
- Oratio Oxoniae habita, 1650.
- Latin Orations in praise of the Protector Oliver and of the Peace with the Dutch, 1653–4.
- Oratio gratulatoria Inaugurationi D. Richardi Cromwelli.
- Oratio steliteutica Oxoniae habita, 14 October 1657, flattering the heads of houses of the university, and directed against the speeches of the terra filii and other wits from whom he himself suffered, 1658.
- Xριστολογία Mετρική, hymnus in usum Scholae Westmonasteriensis, 1658.
- Catechesis, a translation of the shorter catechism into Greek and Latin, 1659.
- Oratio panegyrica in honorem Caroli II, and with it and separately poems in Greek and Latin in praise of the king and queen.
- M. T. Ciceronis Vita, 1662.
- Προεδρία βασιλική, with a translation into Latin of James Howell's Treatise on Ambassadors, 1664.
- Latin verses in Luctus Posthumus Magdalensis, 1624, and elsewhere.

He also translated one or more of the plays of Margaret Cavendish, Duchess of Newcastle, according to Anthony Wood; he may only in fact have translated, anonymously, her biography of her husband William Cavendish, 1st Duke of Newcastle.
