= Philip Davies (priest) =

The Ven. Philip Bertram Davies (13 July 1933 – 1 February 2005) was the Archdeacon of St Albans in the Church of England from 1987 until 1998.

Davies was born into an ecclesiastical family and was educated at Lancing College. After an earlier career as a tea planter, he entered Ripon College Cuddesdon to study for the priesthood. He was ordained in 1964 and began his career with a curacy at St John the Baptist, Atherton. He was Vicar at St Mary Magdalene, Eccles from 1966 to 1971; and Rector of St Philip with St Stephen, Salford from then until 1976. After this, he was vicar of Christchurch, Radlett and Rural Dean of Aldenham before his years as an Archdeacon.

Church of England titles
Preceded by Edward Norfolk	Archdeacon of St Albans; 1987–1998	Succeeded by Richard Cheetham
