= Bishop of Oxford =

Diocesan bishop in the Church of England

- Bishopric

anglican
- Incumbent; Vacant

Location
- Ecclesiastical province: Canterbury

Information
- First holder: Robert King
- Established: 1542
- Diocese: Oxford
- Cathedral: Christ Church Cathedral

The Bishop of Oxford is the diocesan bishop of the Church of England Diocese of Oxford in the Province of Canterbury; his seat is at Christ Church Cathedral, Oxford. The See is currently in vacancy following the retirement of Steven Croft on 4 July 2026. The diocese is led by the Acting Bishop of Oxford, the Rt Revd Gavin Collins.

The Bishop of Oxford has authority throughout the diocese, but also has primary responsibility for the city and suburbs of Oxford, which form the Archdeaconry of Oxford. From 1636 the Bishop was housed in the purpose-built Cuddesdon Palace.

== History ==
The origins of Christianity in this part of England go back at least to the 7th century, when Saint Birinus brought his mission to the West Saxons in 634. The West Saxon King Cynegils was baptised in the River Thames near the present site of Dorchester Abbey, where the original See was established.

The see was transferred in 1092 to Winchester, before being absorbed into the Diocese of Lincoln, the vast extent of which covered much of central and eastern England from the River Thames to the Humber.

King Henry VIII, acting now as head of the Church in England, established by Act of Parliament in 1542 six new dioceses, mostly out of the spoils of the suppressed monasteries. These six were Bristol, Chester, Gloucester, Oxford, Peterborough and Westminster. This intervention by Henry VIII saw a new see located at Osney in Oxfordshire in 1542 before finally being moved to its present location in the City of Oxford in 1546.

While the city gained prosperity from the accession of thousands of students, it was never, apart from the university, again prominent in history until the seventeenth century, when it became the headquarters of the Royalist party, and again the meeting-place of Parliament. The city of Oxford showed its Hanoverian sympathies long before the university, and feeling between them ran high in consequence. The area and population of the city remained almost stationary until about 1830, but since then it has grown rapidly.

== Modern bishopric ==
The modern diocese covers the counties of Oxfordshire, Berkshire, and Buckinghamshire, with parishes also in Bedfordshire, Gloucestershire, Hampshire, Hertfordshire, and Warwickshire. The see is in the City of Oxford where the seat is located at the Cathedral Church of Christ which was elevated to cathedral status in 1546, and which (uniquely among English dioceses) is also the chapel of Christ Church, Oxford. The Oxford diocese at the present day contains the greatest number of parishes of any diocese on England (621) and also the most church buildings (815), of which 475 are grade 1 or 2* listed buildings.

Croft is the first to reside at the new Bishop's Lodge, Kidlington; "for decades" previously, bishops had resided at Linton Road in North Oxford. Each bishop signs + Christian name Oxon:; e.g. + Steven Oxon:.

== List of bishops ==
List of the Bishops of Oxford, and its precursor offices.

(Dates in italics indicate de facto continuation of office)

Bishops of Oxford
From	Until	Incumbent	Notes
See at Osney
1542	1546	Robert King	previously suffragan bishop to the Bishop of Lincoln (as titular Bishop of Rheon, Greece)
See at Oxford
1546	1558	Robert King	previously Bishop of Rheon (above)
1558	1559	Thomas Goldwell	Translated from St Asaph: his nomination had however been left unsigned at the death of the Queen; deprived, fled to Milan, Naples and Rome
1559	1567	See vacant	
1567	1568	Hugh Curwen	Translated from Dublin
1568	1589	See vacant	
1589	1592	John Underhill	Rector of Lincoln College, Oxford
1592	1604	See vacant	
1604	1618	John Bridges	Dean of Salisbury
1619	1628	John Howson	Student of Christ Church, Oxford; translated to Durham
1628	1632	Richard Corbet	Dean of Christ Church, Oxford; translated to Norwich
1632	1641	John Bancroft	Master of University College, Oxford
1641	1646	Robert Skinner	Translated from Bristol; deprived of the see when the English episcopacy was abolished by Parliament on 9 October 1646.
1646	1660	The see was abolished during the Commonwealth and the Protectorate.	
1660	1663	Robert Skinner	Restored; translated to Worcester
1663	1665	William Paul	Dean of Lichfield
1665	1671	Walter Blandford	Warden of Wadham College, Oxford; translated to Worcester
1671	1674	Nathaniel Crew	Rector of Lincoln College, Oxford, and Dean of Chichester; translated to Durham
1674	1676	Henry Compton	Canon of Christ Church, Oxford; translated to London
1676	1686	John Fell	Dean of Christ Church, Oxford
1686	1687	Samuel Parker	Archdeacon of Canterbury; died in office
1688	1690	Timothy Hall	Denied installation by the Chapter of Christ Church
1690	1699	John Hough	President of Magdalen College, Oxford; translated to Lichfield
1699	1715	William Talbot	Dean of Worcester; translated to Salisbury
1715	1737	John Potter	Regius Professor of Divinity, Oxford; translated to Canterbury
1737	1758	Thomas Secker	Translated from Bristol; translated to Canterbury
1758	1766	John Hume	Translated from Bristol; translated to Salisbury
1766	1777	Robert Lowth	Translated from St David's; translated to London
1777	1788	John Butler	Prebendary of Winchester; translated to Hereford
1788	1799	Edward Smallwell	Translated from St David's
1799	1807	John Randolph	Regius Professor of Divinity, Oxford; translated to Bangor
1807	1811	Charles Moss	
1812	1815	William Jackson	Regius Professor of Greek, Oxford
1816	1827	Edward Legge	Dean of Windsor
1827	1829	Charles Lloyd	Regius Professor of Divinity, Oxford
1829	1845	Richard Bagot	Dean of Canterbury; translated to Bath & Wells
1845	1869	Samuel Wilberforce	Dean of Westminster; translated to Winchester
1870	1889	John Mackarness	Prebendary of Exeter
1889	1901	William Stubbs	Translated from Chester
1901	1911	Francis Paget	Dean of Christ Church, Oxford
1911	1919	Charles Gore	Translated from Birmingham; resigned
1919	1925	Hubert Burge	Translated from Southwark
1925	1937	Thomas Strong	Translated from Ripon; resigned
1937	1954	Kenneth Kirk	Regius Professor of Moral and Pastoral Theology, Oxford
1955	1970	Harry Carpenter	Warden of Keble College, Oxford; resigned
1971	1978	Kenneth Woollcombe	Principal of Edinburgh Theological College; resigned
1978	1986	Patrick Rodger	Translated from Manchester; resigned
1987	2006	Richard Harries	Dean of King's College, London; ennobled on retirement
2006	2014	John Pritchard	Translated from Jarrow
2014	2016	Colin Fletcher; Bishop of Dorchester	Acting Bishop. The unusually long vacancy was due to the Crown Nominations Commission failing to appoint in May 2015, and having to rejoin the back of the 'queue' for a second chance in March 2016.
6 July 2016	4 July 2026	Steven Croft	Translated from Sheffield; resigned (on retirement)
4 July 2026	incumbent (acting)	Gavin Collins, Bishop of Dorchester	Acting Bishop.

== Assistant bishops ==
Among those who have served the diocese as stipendiary (i.e. not retired) Assistant Bishops have been:

- 1921 – 1936 (ret.): Edward Shaw, Archdeacon of Oxford and canon residentiary of Christ Church; former Bishop suffragan of Buckingham
- 1936 – 1939: Gerald Allen, Archdeacon of Oxford and Canon of Christ Church, former Bishop of Sherborne (became first Bishop suffragan of Dorchester)
- 1947 – 1952 (ret.): Roscow Shedden, Vicar of Wantage and former Bishop of Nassau
- late 1951 – 1963 (d.): Vibert Jackson, Vicar of South Ascot (since 1940) and former Bishop of the Windward Islands
- c. 1952 – 1959: Geoffrey Allen, Principal of Ripon Hall and former Bishop in Egypt (became Bishop of Derby)
- 1986–1988: Patrick Harris, Secretary of the Partnership for World Mission and former Bishop of Northern Argentina (later Bishop of Southwell)

Those who have served in (or into) retirement have included:

- 1952 (ret.) – 1956 (d.): Roscow Shedden, former Bishop of Nassau
- 1952 (ret.) – 1956 (d.): Gerald Allen, retired Bishop suffragan of Dorchester
- 1954 (ret.) – 1961 (d.): Arthur Parham, retired Bishop suffragan of Reading

== See also ==
- Cuddesdon Palace
