= Jack Cockbill =

Australian rules footballer

Personal information
- Full name: John Cockbill
- Born: 7 March 1880; Melbourne, Victoria
- Died: 6 April 1944 (aged 64); East Melbourne, Victoria
- Original team: Melbourne Grammar
- Height: 178 cm (5 ft 10 in)
- Weight: 68 kg (150 lb)

Playing career^{1}
| Years | Club | Games (Goals) |
| 1899 | South Melbourne | 3 (0) |
- ^{1} Playing statistics correct to the end of 1899.

Jack Cockbill (7 March 1880 – 6 April 1944) was an Australian rules footballer who played with South Melbourne in the Victorian Football League (VFL).
