= Anthony Grant (priest) =

English clergyman and divine (1806–1883)

Anthony Grant, D.C.L. (31 January 1806 – 25 November 1883 in Ramsgate) was an English clergyman and divine.

== Life ==
Grant was youngest son of Thomas Grant of Portsea, Portsmouth. He was born 31 January 1806, was sent to Winchester College in 1815, and on 17 February 1825 matriculated as a scholar of New College, Oxford, becoming fellow in 1827. He was also president of the Oxford Union. As a member of this college Grant did not go out in the university class lists, but he obtained the chancellor's Latin essay in 1830, and the Ellerton theological prize essay in 1832. He proceeded B.C.L. in 1832, and D.C.L. 1842. In 1834 he was ordained, and two years later became curate of Chelmsford; from 1838 to 1862 he was vicar of Romford (St Edward the Confessor), Essex, and from 1862 to 1877 vicar of Aylesford, Kent. In 1843 he was Bampton lecturer at Oxford University, and delivered a course entitled The Past and Prospective Extension of the Gospel by Missions to the Heathen, London, 1844. These lectures created a powerful impression, and their publication marks an epoch in the history of mission work. In 1845 Grant was made Prebendary of Reculversland in St Paul's Cathedral which he resigned in 1846 on being appointed archdeacon of St. Albans, the archdeaconry of Rochester being annexed to it in 1863; in 1852 and 1861 he was select preacher at Oxford; in 1860 he became canon of Rochester Cathedral, and in 1877 chaplain to the bishop of St. Albans. In 1882 he resigned his archdeaconry of Rochester, but retained that of St. Albans and his canonry till his death, which took place at Ramsgate 25 Nov. 1883. He married in 1838 Julia, daughter of General Peter Carey.

Grant was remarkable for his administrative capacity, and was a good preacher.

== Works ==
Besides his Bampton lectures and a few separate sermons, Grant published:

- The Extension of the Church in the Colonies and Dependencies of the British Empire, Ramsden sermon for 1852.
- An Historical Sketch of the Crimea, 1855.
- The Church in China and Japan, a sermon with introductory preface, 1858.
- Within the Veil, and other Sermons, edited after his death in 1884 by his son, the Rev. Cyril Fletcher Grant.
