= Charles Cockbill =

English Archdeacon

Charles Shipley Cockbill , MA (27 January 1888 – 13 March 1965) was the Archdeacon of St Albans in the Church of England from 1951 until 1962.

Cockbill was educated at Bristol Grammar School and St John's College, Oxford. He was ordained in 1911 and began his career with curacies at St John's, Bridgwater and Holy Trinity, Eltham. He held incumbencies at All Saints, Oakhill, Holy Trinity, Bath and St John the Evangelist, Digswell. He was diocesan director of religious education for the Diocese of St Albans from 1935 to 1948; and a canon residentiary of its cathedral from 1942 to 1958.

Church of England titles
Preceded by Thomas Wood	Archdeacon of St Albans; 1951–1962	Succeeded by Basil Snell
