= Harmer =

Harmer is a surname. Notable people with the surname include:

- Alfred C. Harmer (1825–1900), American politician
- Ambrose Harmer (died c.1647), Virginia colonial politician
- Barbara Harmer (1953–2011), English Concorde pilot
- Dani Harmer (born 1989), British actress
- Florence Harmer (1890–1976), English historian
- Frederic William Harmer (1835–1923), English geologist
- Frederick Harmer (1884–1919), English athlete
- James Harmer (1777–1853), English lawyer and alderman
- John Harmer (bishop) (1857–1944), Anglican bishop of Adelaide, then of Rochester
- John Harmer (mayor) (fl. 1737–47), Virginia colonial politician
- John L. Harmer (1934–2019), American politician
- Juliet Harmer (born 1943), British actress
- Lillian Harmer (1883–1946), American character actress
- Nick Harmer (born 1975), American rock musician
- Russell Harmer (1896–1940), British sailor
- Sarah Harmer (born 1970), Canadian singer-songwriter
- Shirley Harmer (born 1933), Canadian singer and actress
- Sidney Frederic Harmer (1862–1950), British zoologist
- Simon Harmer (born 1989), South African cricketer
- Thomas Harmer (1715–1788), English church minister and writer
- Wendy Harmer (born 1955), Australian writer and comedian

== See also ==
- Harmer Hill, village in Shropshire, England
- Harmer E. Davis Transportation Library at the University of California at Berkeley

== See also ==
- Harmar (disambiguation)
