= Jonathan Smith (priest) =

The Venerable Jonathan Smith
- Archdeacon of St Albans
- Church: Church of England
- Province: Province of Canterbury
- Diocese: Diocese of St Albans
- In office: 2008 to present

Orders
- Ordination: 1980 (deacon); 1981 (priest)

Personal details
- Born: Jonathan Peter Smith; 10 November 1955 (age 70)
- Denomination: Anglicanism
- Education: King's College London; University of Cambridge; Westcott House, Cambridge

Jonathan Peter Smith (born 10 November 1955) is an Anglican priest: he was Archdeacon of St Albans from 2008 to 2020. Before becoming archdeacon in 2008, he served as a chaplain and a vicar.

== Early life and education ==
Smith was born on 10 November 1955. He grew up in East Suffolk. He studied theology at King's College London. He graduated from the university in 1977 with a Bachelor of Divinity (BD) degree and the Associateship of King's College (AKC) qualification. He then undertook teacher training at the University of Cambridge, graduating with a Postgraduate Certificate in Education (PGCE) in 1978. In 1979, he matriculated into Westcott House, Cambridge to undertake training for the priesthood.

== Ordained ministry ==
Smith was ordained in the Church of England as a deacon in 1980 and as a priest in 1981. From 1980 to 1982, he served as an assistant curate at All Saints’ Church, Gosforth, an area of Newcastle upon Tyne. He then served as an assistant curate at Waltham Abbey Church, Waltham Abbey, Essex, from 1982 to 1985.

From 1985 to 1997, he served as a chaplain. First, from 1985 to 1988, he was Chaplain of City University London. Then, from 1990 to 1997, he was a chaplain to Bedfordshire Police. In addition, from 1988 to 1997, he was Rector of St Peter and All Saints Church, Harrold, Bedfordshire. From 1997 to 2008, he was Vicar of St John the Baptist Church, Harpenden, Hertfordshire. He was also rural dean of Wheathampstead from 1999 to 2004.

Having spent twenty years as a priest in the Diocese of St Albans, he was appointed Archdeacon of St Albans in July 2008. He retired in 2020, and has since held permission to officiate in the Diocese of St Albans.

== Personal life ==
Smith is a youth football referee and is also interested in amateur acting.
