= George Etherege (scholar) =

English classical scholar and physician

George Etherege or Ethrygg (Latin: Edrycus) (fl. 1588), was an English classical scholar and physician.

== Biography ==
Etherege, born at Thame, Oxfordshire, was admitted a scholar of Corpus Christi College, Oxford, on 11 November 1534, being placed under the tuition of John Shepreve. He was admitted B.A. on 15 February 1538–9; was elected a probationer fellow of his college six days afterwards; commenced M.A. in July 1543; and was admitted bachelor of medicine and licensed to practise in 1545.

According to the books of Christ Church, Oxford, he was Regius professor of Greek from 25 March 1547 till 1 October 1550; and afterwards, in the same books, his name again appears from November 1554 till 21 April 1559. In 1556 he was recommended by Lord Williams of Thame to Sir Thomas Pope to be admitted fellow of Trinity College, then first founded; but as Etherege chose to pursue the medical line, that scheme did not take effect. As he had been a zealous Catholic in Mary's reign, he was deprived of his professorship soon after Elizabeth's accession. Subsequently, he practised medicine with considerable success in Oxford and its vicinity.

He lived with his family in 'an ancient decayed palace of literature called George-hall,’ nearly opposite the south end of Cat Street in St. Mary's parish, and took in the sons of Catholic gentlemen as boarders. Among his pupils was Gabriel Gifford, afterwards archbishop of Rheims. On account of his firm adherence to the old form of religion he suffered frequent imprisonments both at Oxford and London during the space of about thirty years. This seriously impaired his health and fortune.

He was living, 'an ancient man,’ in 1588, but the date of his death is unrecorded. His friend John Leland celebrated his memory in verse; and Wood says 'he was esteemed by most persons, mostly by those of his opinion, a noted mathematician, well skill'd in vocal and instrumental music, an eminent Hebritian, Grecian, and poet, and above all an excellent physician.'

== Works ==
1. 'Ἐγκώμιον τῶν πράξεῶν κὰι τῶν στατηγημάτῶν τοῦ Ἑνρικοῦ ὀγδόου εὐφανεστάτοῦ βασιλέως.' Royal MS. in Brit. Mus. 16 C. x ff. 1–38. The poem is in Greek hexameters and pentameters, with a dedication to Queen Elizabeth in Greek, and a summary in Latin of the contents of the work, which was presented to Her Majesty when she visited Oxford in 1566. 2. Musical compositions, in manuscript. 3. 'Diversa carmina,’ manuscript. 4. The Psalms of David turned into a short form of Hebrew verse and set to music. 5. A Latin translation of most, if not all, of the works of Justin Martyr. 6. 'In libros pauli Aeginetæ, hypomnemata quædam, seu obseruationes medicamentorum, quæ hac ætate in vsu sunt, per Georgium Edrychum medicum pro iuuenum studijs ad praxim medicam, collecta,’ London, 1588, 8vo, dedicated to Walter Mildmay. 7. 'Martyrium S. Demetrii,’ a translation into Latin preserved in manuscript at Caius College, Cambridge (E. 4). It is dedicated to Thomas Robertson, archdeacon of Leicester.

It is said that he brought out the edition of Shepreve's 'Hippolytus,’ published at Oxford in 1584, but another account states that this edition was prepared by Joseph Barnes.
