= John Harmar =

English classical scholar

John Harmar (ca. 1555–1613) was an English classical scholar and Warden of Winchester College.

== Life ==
Harmar was educated at Winchester College and New College, Oxford, (BA 1577, MA 1582) under the patronage of Robert Dudley, 1st Earl of Leicester. He travelled to Geneva, where he heard the lectures and sermons of Theodore Beza and "found him no lesse than a father unto me in curtesie & good will." From 1585 until 1590, he was the Regius Professor of Greek (Oxford) (a chair later held by his nephew, also named John Harmar), and his 1586 edition of six of John Chrysostom's sermons was the first Greek text printed at Oxford. Harmar was Winchester's Headmaster from 1588 to 1595 and Warden from 1596 until his death. In 1605, he received the degrees of BD and DD, in recognition of his role as one of the translators of the 1611 Authorized Version of the Bible. He was part of the Second Oxford Company, assigned to work on the Gospels, the Acts of the Apostles, and the Book of Revelation. He died on 11 October 1613, and was buried in the chapel of New College, Oxford.

== Works ==
- Sermons of M. Iohn Caluine, vpon the.X.Commandementes of the Lawe, geuen of God by Moses, otherwise called the Decalogue. Gathered word for word, presently at his sermons, when he preached on Deuteronomie, without adding vnto, or diminishing from them any thing afterward. Translated out of Frenche into English, by I.H. (London, 1579)
- D. Ioannis Chrysostomi Archiepiscopi Constantinopolitani, Homiliæ sex, Ex manuscriptis Codicibus Noui Collegij; Ioannis Harmari, eiusdem Collegij socij, & Græcarum literarum in inclyta Oxoniensi Academia Professoris Regij, opera & industria nunc primùm græcè in lucem editæ. (Oxford, Joseph Barnes, 1586, the first Greek book printed at Oxford)
- Master Bezaes sermons vpon the three chapters of the canticle of canticles wherein are handled the chiefest points of religion controversed and debated betweene vs and the aduersarie at this day, especially touching the true Iesus Christ and the true Church, and the certaine & infallible marks both of the one and of the other. Translated out of French into English by Iohn Harmar (Oxford, Joseph Barnes, 1587)
- D. Ioannis Chrysostomi Archiepiscopi Constantinopolitani homiliae ad populum Antiochenum, cum presbyter esset Antiochiæ, habitæ, duæ & viginti. Omnes, excepta prima, nunc primùm in lucem editæ, ex manuscriptis Noui Collegij Oxoniensis codicibus. Opera & studio Ioannis Harmari Collegij prope Winton Magistri Informatoris. Cum Latina versione eiusdem, homiliæ decimæ nonæ, quæ in Latinis etiam exemplaribus hactenus desiderata est. (London, 1590)
