= Community school (England and Wales) =

Type of state-funded school

A community school in England and Wales is a type of state-funded school in which the local education authority employs the school's staff, is responsible for the school's admissions and owns the school's estate. The formal use of this name to describe a school derives from the School Standards and Framework Act 1998.

== Board school ==
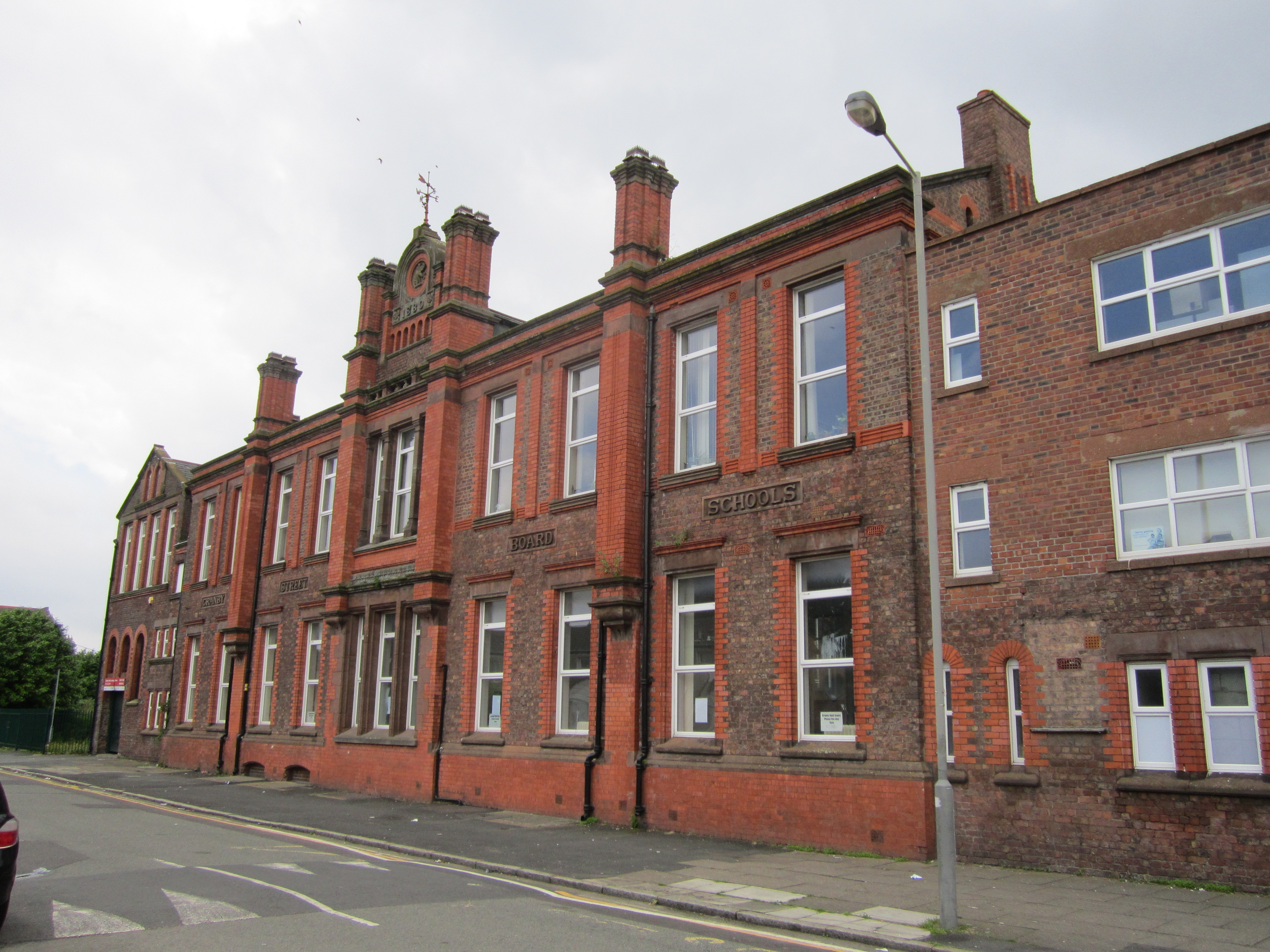
Granby Street Board School, Toxteth, Liverpool

In the mid-19th century, government involvement in schooling consisted of annual grants to the National Society for Promoting Religious Education and the British and Foreign School Society (BFSS) to support the "voluntary schools" that they ran, and monitoring inspections of these schools. The Elementary Education Act 1870 (33 & 34 Vict. c. 75) imposed stricter standards on schools, and provided for the setting up of locally elected school boards in boroughs and parishes across England and Wales, empowered to set up elementary-level board schools where voluntary provision was insufficient to meet local education need.

A number of voluntary schools, especially those of the BFSS, chose to become board schools. Parents were still required to pay fees, though the fees of the poorest were paid by the board.

== County School ==
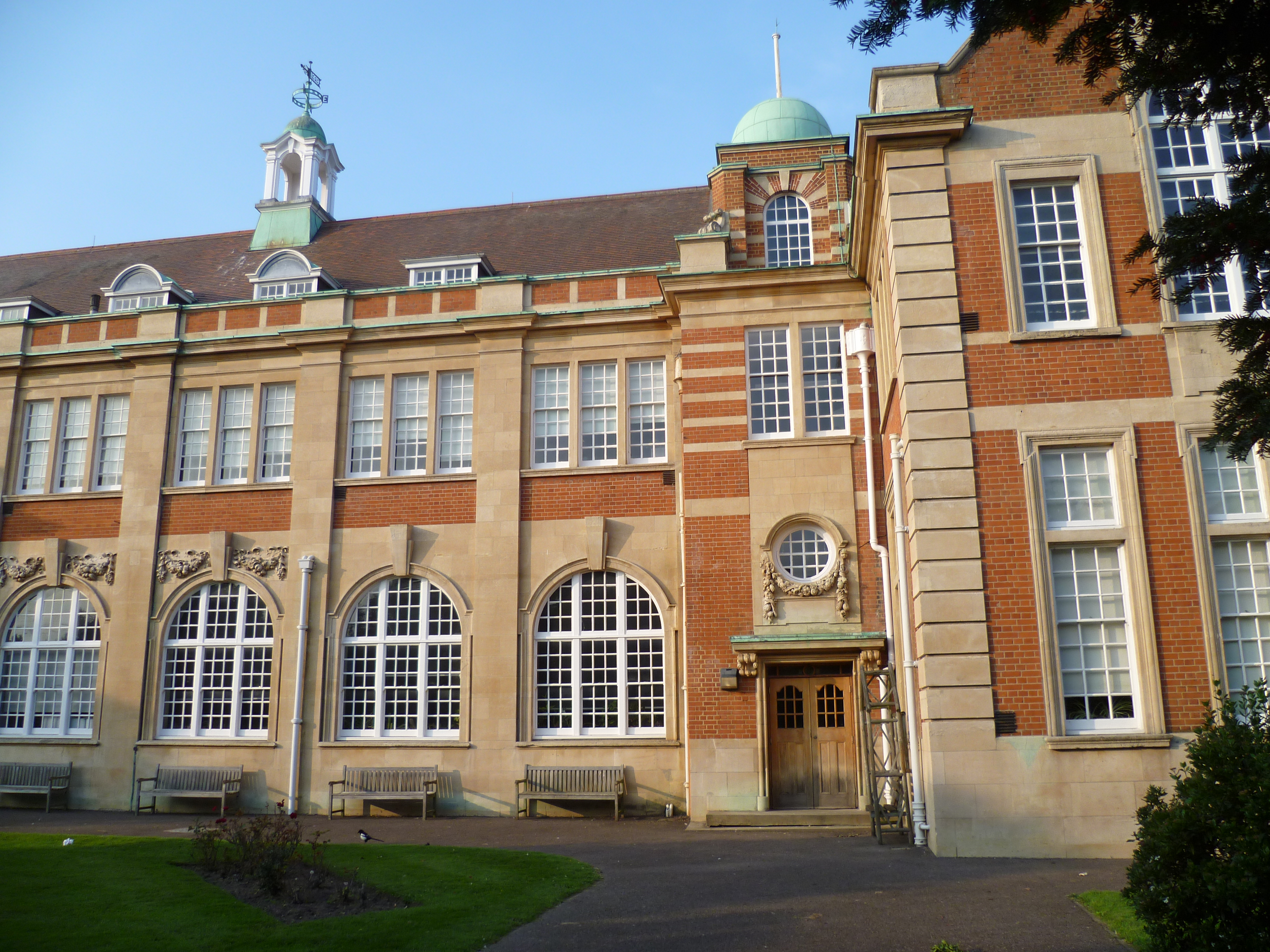
Enfield County School, Greater London

The Education Act 1902 abolished school boards, transferring their functions to counties and boroughs acting as local education authorities. The board schools were thus renamed county schools. The act also introduced county secondary schools, which were greatly expanded during the early 20th century. Prior to the changes introduced in the Education Act 1944 the county secondary schools provided a grammar school type education to a small sector of the school age population. Most children were educated in an elementary school until the then school leaving age of 14. The name 'county school' was prestigious and remained in common usage to describe local grammar schools after 1944. Some schools retain the word 'county' in their name whether still under local authority control or moved to academy status viz. Chelmsford County High School for Girls, Colchester County High School for Girls, Enfield County School, Ilford County High School, Guildford County School, Wallington County Grammar School.

== School Standards and Framework Act 1998 ==
Local authority maintained schools were renamed community schools in the School Standards and Framework Act 1998. In 2008 approximately 61% of the state-funded primary and secondary schools in England were community schools.

== See also ==
- Foundation school
- Voluntary aided school
- Voluntary controlled school
- Academy
- State-funded schools (England)
- History of education in England
- Education in Wales
- Free school (England)
