= Christopher Foster (bishop) =

British Anglican bishop

The Right Reverend Christopher Foster
- Bishop of Portsmouth
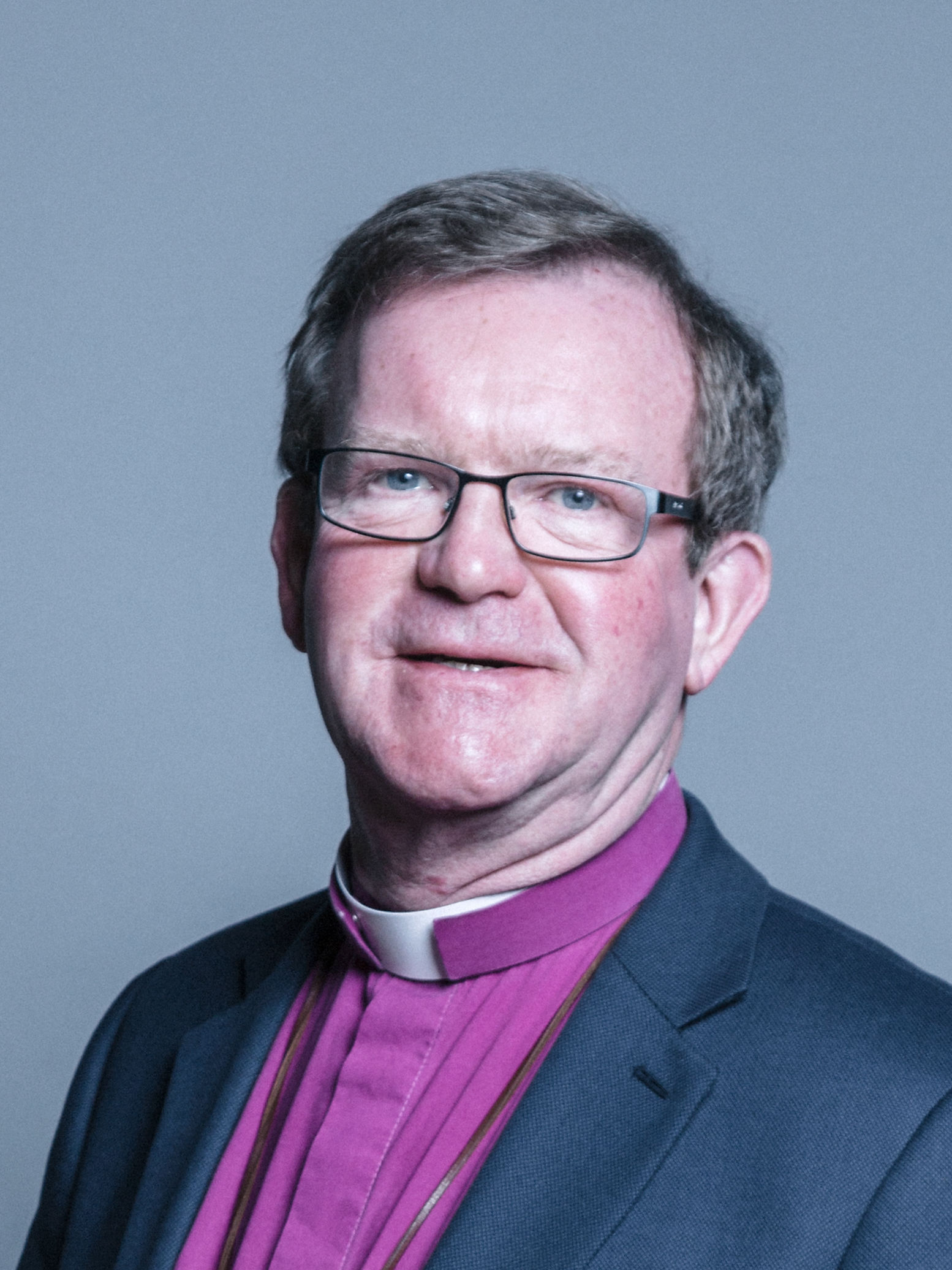
- Church: Church of England
- Diocese: Diocese of Portsmouth
- In office: 2010–2021
- Predecessor: Kenneth Stevenson
- Other post: Bishop of Hertford (2001–2010)

Orders
- Ordination: 1981
- Consecration: 21 October 2001 by George Carey

Personal details
- Born: 7 November 1953 (age 72)
- Denomination: Anglican
- Residence: Bishopsgrove, Fareham
- Spouse: Julia Marie née Jones (m. 1982; died 2001) Sally Elizabeth née Davenport (m. 2006)
- Children: two (with Julia)
- Education: Durham University

Member of the House of Lords
- Lord Spiritual
- Bishop of Portsmouth; 6 February 2014 – 31 May 2021

Christopher Richard James Foster (born 7 November 1953) is a retired Anglican bishop who served as Bishop of Portsmouth in the Church of England from 2010 to 2021.

== Early life ==
Foster was born on 7 November 1953. He was educated at Durham University, studying Economics and Politics, where he held the position of Chapel Clerk at University College. He completed a Masters degree in Econometrics at the University of Manchester. He studied for ordination at Westcott House, Cambridge, obtaining a Theology degree at Trinity Hall.

== Career ==
Foster was a lecturer in Economics at Durham University, 1976/7, and a part-time Economics supervisor at St John’s College, Cambridge 1977-1980.

He was made a deacon on St Peter's Day (29 June) 1980 and ordained a priest the following Petertide (28 June 1981) – both times by Kenneth Skelton, Bishop of Lichfield, at Lichfield Cathedral – and began his ordained ministry with a curacy in Tettenhall Regis in Wolverhampton, after which he became chaplain of Wadham College, Oxford. Following this he was vicar of Christ Church Southgate and finally a canon residentiary and sub-dean at St Albans Cathedral.

On 21 October 2001, he was consecrated a bishop by George Carey, Archbishop of Canterbury, at Southwark Cathedral, to serve the Diocese of St Albans as suffragan Bishop of Hertford. In February 2010, it was announced that Foster would be the new Bishop of Portsmouth. He was enthroned on 18 September 2010.

In 2011 he was awarded an honorary degree, DLitt, by the University of Hertfordshire.

On 13 December 2020, he announced that he would be retiring as Bishop of Portsmouth from April 2021. He retired on 24 April 2021.

Foster was appointed as a Trustee on the board the Royal Hospital for Neurodisability in 2021 chairing the Ethics Committee and the People and Culture Committee.

in 2022 he was appointed as a Council member of the Cremation Society.

From 2022 to 2026 he was a non-executive member of NHS Somerset Integrated Care Board (ICB), chairing the Finance Committee, Remuneration Committee and the People Board.

Since 2026 he has been a non-executive member of the boards of NHS Bath & North-east Somerset, Swindon and Wiltshire ICB, NHS Dorset ICB, and NHS Somerset ICB, as chair of the Population Health and Commissioning Committee.

== Views ==
=== Welfare reform ===
Foster has spoken out against the Conservative government's changes to the welfare state and austerity measures. In October 2015, he called proposed cuts to tax credits "morally indefensible":

It's clear to me and many others that these proposals blatantly threaten damage to the lives of millions of our fellow citizens. This must not be the way to achieve the Government's goal at a cost to those, who if we believe the rhetoric, the Government intends to encourage and support. To many in my diocese and beyond this seems punishing rather than encouragement.

== Personal life ==
Foster's first wife died in 2001; they have two adult children. He married his second wife, Sally, in 2006.

== Styles ==
- The Reverend Christopher Foster (1981–1994)
- The Reverend Canon Christopher Foster (1994–2001)
- The Right Reverend Christopher Foster (2001–present)

Church of England titles
Preceded by Robin Smith	Bishop of Hertford; 2001–2010	Succeeded by Paul Bayes
Preceded by Kenneth Stevenson	Bishop of Portsmouth; 2010–2021	Succeeded by Jonathan Frost
