= Paul Bayes =

Anglican bishop

The Right Reverend Paul Bayes
- Bishop of Liverpool
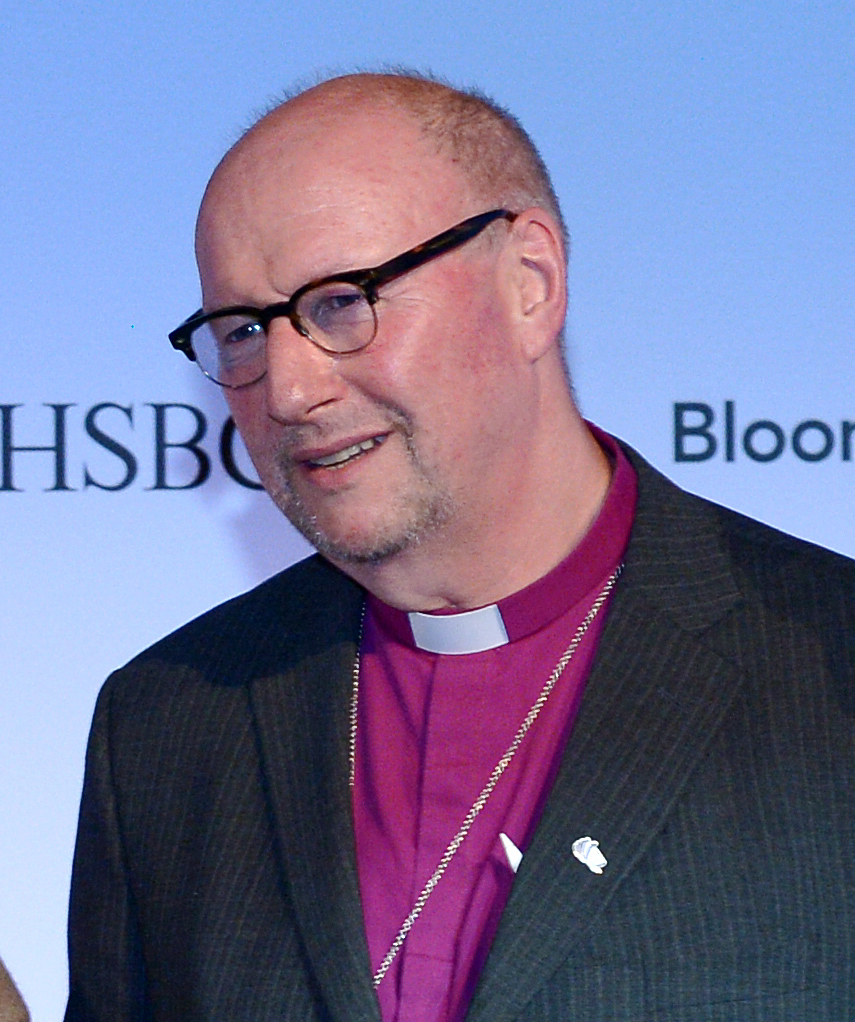
- Bayes in 2016
- Church: Church of England
- Diocese: Liverpool
- In office: 2014–2022
- Predecessor: James Jones
- Successor: John Perumbalath
- Other post: Bishop of Hertford (2010–2014)

Orders
- Ordination: 1979 (deacon); 1980 (priest) by Ronnie Bowlby
- Consecration: 21 September 2010

Personal details
- Born: 2 November 1953 (age 73) Bradford, West Riding of Yorkshire, England
- Denomination: Anglican
- Spouse: Kate (m. 1976)
- Children: 3
- Education: University of Birmingham; Queen's College, Birmingham

Member of the House of Lords
- Lord Spiritual
- Bishop of Liverpool; 15 November 2021 – 2 March 2022

Paul Bayes (born 1953) is an English Anglican retired bishop. He served as Bishop of Hertford, a suffragan bishop in the Church of England's Diocese of St Albans from 2010 to 2014, and then as Bishop of Liverpool from 2014 to 2022.

== Early life ==
Bayes was born in Bradford, West Riding of Yorkshire, on 2 November 1953, and attended Belle Vue Boys School in the city, He studied drama at the University of Birmingham before studying for ordination at Queen's College, Edgbaston.

== Ordained ministry ==
Bayes was ordained in the Church of England, made a deacon at Petertide 1979 (1 July) and as a priest the Petertide following (29 June 1980), both times by Ronnie Bowlby, Bishop of Newcastle, at Newcastle Cathedral. He was an assistant curate at St Paul's Church, Whitley Bay for three years (1979–1982). He then became a university chaplain in west London from 1982 to 1987.

Bayes moved to High Wycombe for seven years where he initially was Team Vicar (1987–1990) and then Team Rector (1990–1994) before becoming Team Rector of Totton for nine years (1995–2004). While he was at Totton, Bayes was also the Area Dean of Lyndhurst from 2000. Upon leaving Totton, he joined the Archbishops' Council staff team as National Mission and Evangelism Adviser until his ordination to the episcopacy. He was also an honorary canon at Worcester Cathedral from 2007 until his consecration.

=== Episcopal ministry ===
On 7 July 2010 it was announced that Bayes would succeed Christopher Foster as Bishop of Hertford upon Foster's translation to Portsmouth. Bayes was duly consecrated a Church of England bishop on 21 September 2010 at St Paul's Cathedral and installed at St Albans Cathedral on 25 September 2010.

On 7 May 2014 it was announced that Bayes was to become the next (8th) Bishop of Liverpool; his canonical election was confirmed on 23 July 2014. Bayes was installed at Liverpool Cathedral on 15 November 2014.

Bayes is the Visitor of St Peter's College, Oxford; he was chosen from among the Church's diocesan bishops, and may serve until he ceases to be one.

He was for a short time a member of House of Lords from 15 November 2021 until his retirement. He retired and resigned the See of Liverpool effective 1 March 2022. He was succeeded as Bishop of Liverpool by John Perumbalath.

=== Views ===
In June 2016 Bayes "called for far-reaching change in the church's attitudes to lesbian and gay people and a meaningful welcome to Christians in same-sex relationships". He supports dropping the requirement for gay Christians to be celibate, saying "I've learned to respect the experiences of people who want to celebrate and express their sexuality, and be within the church". He contributed a chapter to the book Journeys in Grace and Truth: Revisiting Scripture and Sexuality (2016), which aims to show how it is "possible to hold a positive view of same-sex relationships while being a biblically rooted evangelical".

Since 2020, Bayes has been a patron of the Open Table Network, an ecumenical Christian charity for LGBT people and their allies. In a speech at the MOSAIC (Movement of Supporting Anglicans for an Inclusive Church) national conference, he called for the Church of England to adopt a "gender-neutral marriage canon" and "to honour, recognise and, yes indeed, bless same-sex unions". Bayes said, “I want to see a church where, if a congregation and its ministers want to bless and marry same-sex people or trans people, then they should be free to do so without stigma. And those who don’t want to do so should be given freedom of conscience not to do so. I want to see gender-neutral marriage canons, that simply say marriage is between two people.”

Bayes maintains there is too much divisiveness in UK society and in the west generally. Bayes said there is a, “struggle between those in whose interest it is to fragment society and those who want to sustain the common good. (...) It’s not about individual bad apples. It’s about the culture. [the political culture was] adversarial, scratchy, exhausted (...) You see clear illiberalism in eastern Europe, you see the rise of the extreme right in France, and you see what you see in the United States … Basic decencies have been lost.”

In the Diocese of Liverpool, Bayes has sought to galvanise all members of the churches, younger and older, around a vision named "Bigger Church, Bigger Difference", with the stated theme "Making a Bigger Difference — More people knowing Jesus, more justice in the world" This has been further embedded through the call to a Rule of Life within the diocese.

== Personal life ==
Bayes married Katherine (Kate) Soley in 1976; she died in March 2024. He and his wife have three adult children.

== Styles ==
- The Reverend Paul Bayes (1979–2007)
- The Reverend Canon Paul Bayes (2007–2010)
- The Right Reverend Paul Bayes (2010–present)

Church of England titles
Preceded by Christopher Foster	Bishop of Hertford; 2010–2014	Succeeded by Michael Beasley
Preceded by James Jones	Bishop of Liverpool; 2014–2022	Succeeded by John Perumbalath
