= Janet Mackenzie =

British Anglican priest and former teacher

The Venerable Janet Mackenzie
- Archdeacon of Hertford
- Church: Church of England
- Diocese: Diocese of St Albans
- In office: September 2016 to present
- Predecessor: Trevor Jones

Orders
- Ordination: 2006 (deacon); 2007 (priest)

Personal details
- Born: 1962 (age 63–64)
- Denomination: Anglicanism
- Education: Westminster College, Oxford; Westcott House, Cambridge; Anglia Ruskin University

Janet Mackenzie (born 1962) is a British Anglican priest and former teacher. Since September 2016, she has been the Archdeacon of Hertford in the Diocese of St Albans.

== Early life and education ==
Mackenzie was born in 1962. She studied at Westminster College, Oxford, a teacher training college, and graduated with a Bachelor of Education (BEd) degree in 1986. She then worked in education. In 2004, she entered Westcott House, Cambridge, an Anglican theological college in the Liberal Catholic tradition, to train for Holy Orders. During this time, she also studied theology at Anglia Ruskin University, graduating with a Bachelor of Arts (BA) degree in 2008.

== Ordained ministry ==
Mackenzie was ordained in the Church of England as a deacon in 2006 and as a priest in 2007. From 2006 to 2010, she served her curacy at St Swithun's Church, Sandy in the Diocese of St Albans. In 2010, she joined the Church of St Augustine of Canterbury, Luton as priest-in-charge. She was additionally Area Dean of Luton between 2012 and 2016. She was made Vicar of St Augustine's in 2014.

On 6 September 2016, Mackenzie was collated as Archdeacon of Hertford during a service at St Andrew and St George's Church, Stevenage. On 19 November 2016, she was installed as a Canon of St Albans Cathedral; all archdeacons of the diocese are made canons of the cathedral.
