= John Trillo =

British Anglican bishop (1915-1992)

The Right Reverend John Trillo
- Bishop of Chelmsford
- Church: Church of England
- Diocese: Diocese of Chelmsford
- In office: 1971 to 1985
- Predecessor: John Tiarks
- Successor: John Waine
- Previous posts: Bishop of Hertford (1968–1971); Bishop of Bedford (1963–1968)

Orders
- Ordination: 1938 (deacon); 1939 (priest)
- Consecration: 1963

Personal details
- Born: Albert John Trillo; 4 July 1915 London, England
- Died: 2 August 1992 (aged 77) Wenhaston, Suffolk, England
- Denomination: Anglicanism
- Education: King's College, London

Albert John Trillo (4 July 1915 – 2 August 1992) was a British Anglican bishop. He was involved in parish ministry, worked with the Student Christian Movement, and was a lecturer in theology. He was twice a suffragan bishop in the Church of England, Bishop of Bedford (1963–1968) and Bishop of Hertford (1968–1971), before serving as Bishop of Chelmsford from 1971 until his retirement in 1985.

== Biography ==
John Trillo (as he was generally known) grew up in Cricklewood, North London. He was educated at the Quintin School, an all-boys state school in St John's Wood, North London. On leaving school he worked in the film industry, for British Lion. He obtained his degree as a part-time student at King's College, London, graduating with a first class honours Bachelor of Divinity (BD) degree and the Associateship of King's College London (AKC) in 1938.

Trillo was ordained in the Church of England as a deacon in 1938 and as a priest in 1939. He was a curate at Christ Church, Fulham before becoming the priest in charge of St Michael's, Cricklewood. From 1945 he worked for the Student Christian Movement, pioneering its work in Yorkshire grammar schools and becoming its secretary. From 1950-1955 he was rector of Friern Barnet and a lecturer in divinity at King's College, London. In 1955, he was appointed the principal of Bishop's College, Cheshunt, and remained there until his consecration to the episcopate.

In 1963, Trillo was consecrated a bishop and appointed the Bishop of Bedford, a suffragan bishop in the Diocese of St Albans. He became the Bishop of Hertford in 1968 and the Bishop of Chelmsford in 1971. In retirement he continued to serve as an assistant bishop for a further seven years.

Trillo died on 2 August 1992, in Wenhaston, Suffolk.

Church of England titles
Preceded by Basil Tudor Guy	Bishop of Bedford; 1963–1968	Succeeded by John Tyrrell Holmes Hare
Preceded by Inaugural appointment	Bishop of Hertford; 1968–1971	Succeeded by Hubert Victor Whitsey
Preceded by John Gerhard Tiarks	Bishop of Chelmsford; 1971–1985	Succeeded by John Waine
