= Peter Mumford =

Peter Mumford may refer to:

- Peter Mumford (bishop) (1922–1992)
- Peter Mumford (lighting designer)
