= Lord Pearson =

Lord Pearson or Baron Pearson may refer to:

- Sir Charles Pearson, Lord Pearson (1843–1910), Scottish politician and judge, Senator of the College of Justice 1896–1909
- Colin Pearson, Baron Pearson (1899–1980), Canadian-born British barrister and judge
- Malcolm Pearson, Baron Pearson of Rannoch (born 1942), British insurance executive and former leader of the UK Independence Party
