= St John the Baptist Church, Chipping Barnet =

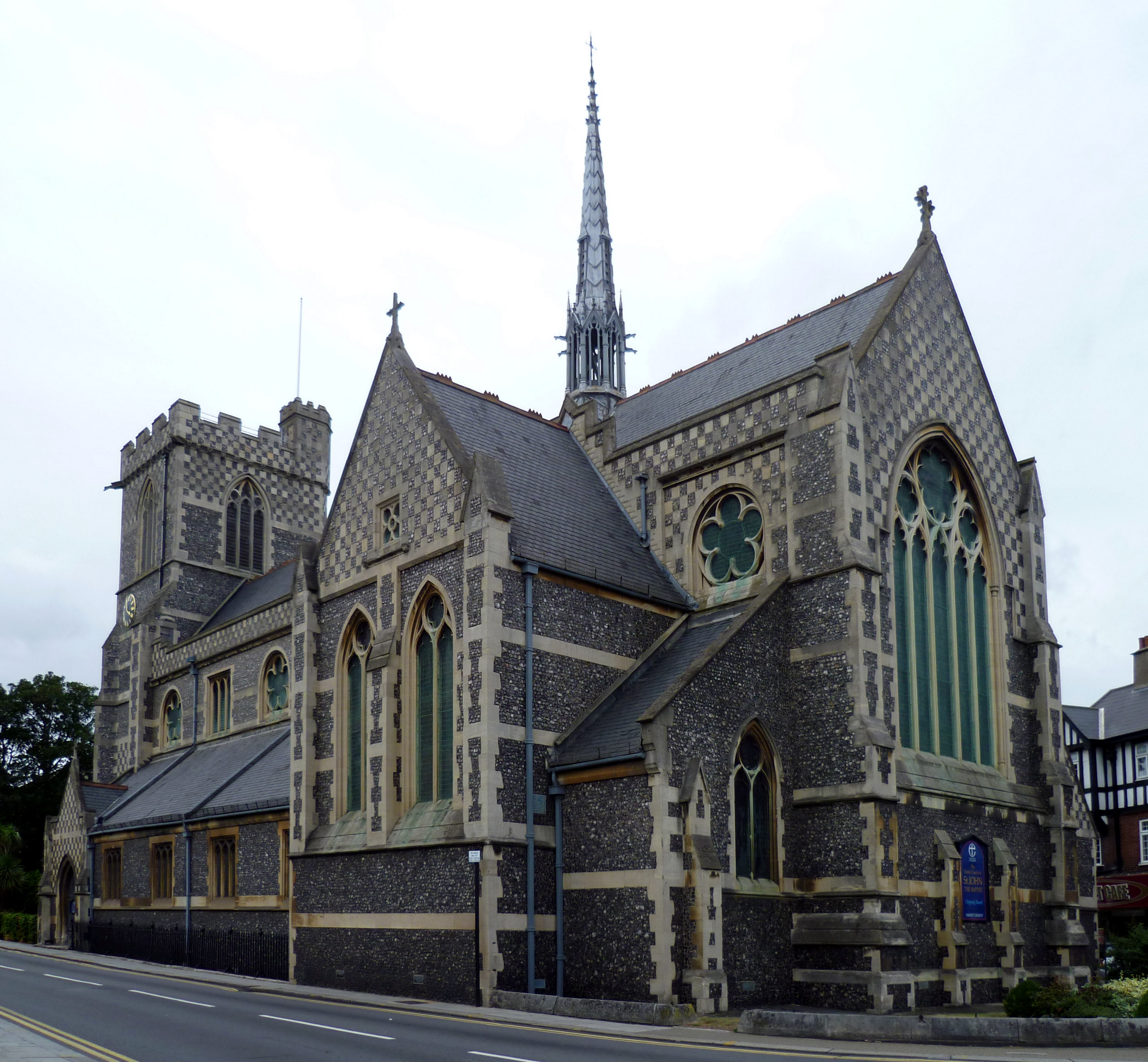
- St John the Baptist Church, Chipping Barnet
- 51°39′12″N 0°12′04″W
- OS grid reference: TQ 24557 96463
- Location: 2 Wood Street, Chipping Barnet, Greater London, EN5 4BW
- Country: England
- Denomination: Church of England
- Churchmanship: Anglican
- Website: Church website

History
- Status: Active

Architecture
- Functional status: Parish church
- Heritage designation: Grade II* listed

Administration
- Province: Canterbury
- Diocese: Diocese of St Albans
- Archdeaconry: Archdeaconry of Hertford
- Deanery: Barnet

Clergy
- Bishop: Right Revd Dr Jane Mainwaring
- Rector: Fr Tristan Chapman
- Vicar: Fr Sam Rossiter

St John the Baptist Church is the Church of England parish church of Chipping Barnet, Greater London. It forms part of the Chipping Barnet Team Ministry, comprising St Mark's, Barnet Vale, St Peter's, Arkley and St Stephen's, Bell's Hill. It crowns the ascent up Barnet Hill, and stands at the junction of Wood Street and High Street. It is one of the few Anglican churches in Greater London to belong to the Diocese of St Albans.

== History ==
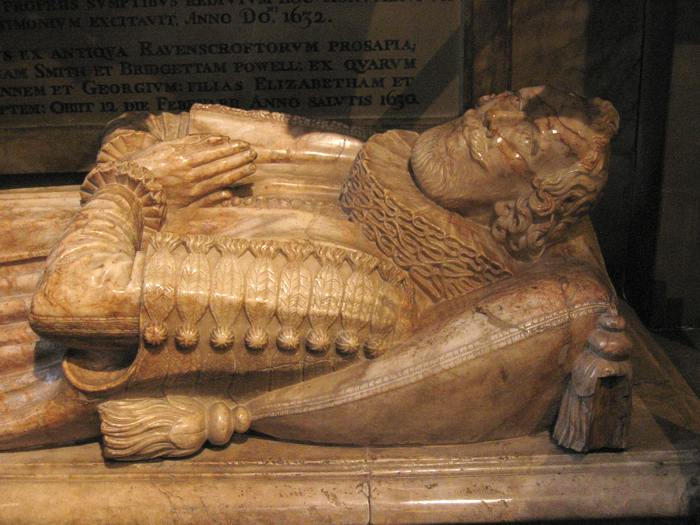
Tomb of Thomas Ravenscroft in Chipping Barnet Church

The evidence for a church comes from the Manor Court records which show that a chapel was in existence in 1272, built to serve the needs of the people of the village, the market and those who passed through. It is assumed that the building had been built around 1250. The first mention of a priest was in 1258, when it was noted that the 'Parson of Barnet' owned a copy of the works of the Latin poet, Ovid. At the time Chipping Barnet was chapel-of-ease to the much older parish church of St Mary the Virgin in East Barnet. It was only in 1866 that the livings were separated by an Order in Council.

The church stands in what was the centre of the town. It was rebuilt by John de la Moote, abbot of St Albans, about 1400, the architect being Beauchamp. Playing on its antiquity, it continues to call itself "Barnet Church", although this is not an official title. It is in fact the parish church of Chipping Barnet only, whilst Christ Church is the parish church of High Barnet.

The church was extensively renovated by William Butterfield in 1871–1872, at which time the tomb of Thomas Ravenscroft, a local benefactor who died in 1630, was moved from the chancel to a newly built chapel. The wooden flèche, together with the pulpit and pew ends were designed by John Charles Traylen.

During the mid-twentieth century, the roof of St John the Baptist was repaired, and Church House was restored. A fire in 1974 severely damaged the choir vestry, then under the tower, and threatened to destroy the whole building. It was put out just in time, and in the aftermath, ideas came forward for some of the changes which were put into effect in 1984. These included new glass doors as the main entrance under the tower, the creation of a new choir vestry and alterations to the organ.

Fr Sam Rossiter-Peters was licensed as vicar on 9 November 2021. He followed on from Fr Chris Ferris, who was installed on 1 September 2014. Bishop Hall Speers, Fr Chris Ferris' predecessor final service took place on 17 November 2013.

== Building ==
St John the Baptist, the ancient parish church of Chipping Barnet, consists of a nave and aisles separated by clustered columns which support four pointed arches; a chancel with an east window of good Perpendicular tracery; a vestry, built in the reign of James I by Thomas Ravenscroft; and at the west end, a low, square embattled tower. In 1679, James Ravenscroft (son of Thomas) established a charity, which provides funds for the repair and maintenance of the tomb of Thomas Ravenscroft and his wife Thomasina.

Since 1950, the church has been a Grade II* listed building.

== Music ==
The church has also played host to the High Barnet Chamber Music Festival.

== Status ==
The benefice of Barnet is a curacy, held with the rectory of East Barnet till the death of the last incumbent in 1866, when the livings were separated. The parish of Chipping Barnet, served by St John's Church, was provided with a chapel-of-ease in Victorian times; subsequently Chipping Barnet parish was split in two, and the chapel-of-ease (on Bells Hill, Barnet) raised to the status of a parish church, dedicated to St Stephen.
