= Jane Mainwaring =

British Anglican priest (born 1970)

The Right Reverend Dr Jane Mainwaring
- Bishop of Hertford
- Church: Church of England
- Diocese: Diocese of St Albans
- In office: 2023 present
- Previous post: Archdeacon of St Albans (2000–2003)

Orders
- Ordination: 2000 (deacon); 2001 (priest)
- Consecration: 2 February 2023 by Justin Welby

Personal details
- Born: Jane Frances Mainwaring; 1970 (age 55–56)
- Denomination: Anglicanism
- Education: University of Leeds; Trinity College, Carmarthen

Jane Frances Mainwaring (born 1970) is a British Anglican bishop, who has served as Bishop of Hertford, a suffragan bishop in the Diocese of St Albans, since February 2023. She had previously been Archdeacon of St Albans from March 2020 to 2023.

== Early life and education ==
Mainwaring was born in 1970. She studied theology and religious studies at Leeds University, graduating with a Bachelor of Arts (BA) degree in 1992. She later studied at Trinity College, Carmarthen, graduating with a Master of Philosophy (MPhil) degree in 1997 and a Doctor of Philosophy (PhD) degree in 1999. Her doctoral thesis was titled "Quality and diversity in Anglican primary schools: a study of denominational inspection". From 1998 to 2000, she also trained for ordination on the East Anglian Ministerial Training Course.

== Ordained ministry ==
She was ordained deacon in 2000 and priest in 2001. From 2000 to 2003, she served her a curacy in Sudbury, Suffolk in the Diocese of St Edmundsbury and Ipswich. She was then team vicar of the Parish of Hitchin, Hertfordshire, in the Diocese of St Albans from 2003 to 2020, and additionally rural dean of Hitchin from 2015 to 2020. In 2020, she became an archdeacon, having been collated as Archdeacon of St Albans on 14 March 2020 during a service as St Mary's Church, Hemel Hempstead.

In November 2022, it was announced that Mainwaring would be the next Bishop of Hertford, a suffragan bishop in the Diocese of St Albans. She was consecrated a bishop on 2 February 2023 (the Feast of Candlemas) by Justin Welby, Archbishop of Canterbury, at Canterbury Cathedral.

== Personal life ==
Mainwaring is married to James, a professional woodwind musician. Together, they have two children.

Church of England titles
Preceded by Michael Beasley	Bishop of Hertford; 2023–present	Incumbent
