= Colin Pearson, Baron Pearson =

Canadian-born English barrister and judge

The Right Honourable The Lord Pearson CBE, PC

Lord of Appeal in Ordinary
- In office 1965–1974
- Preceded by: The Lord Evershed

Lord Justice of Appeal
- In office 1961–1965

Justice of the High Court

Personal details
- Born: Colin Hargreaves Pearson Minnedosa, Manitoba, Canada
- Education: Balliol College, Oxford

Colin Hargreaves Pearson, Baron Pearson, CBE, PC (28 July 1899 – 31 January 1980) was a Canadian-born English barrister and judge. Rising to sit as a judge in the House of Lords, he is best remembered for his unspectacular but efficient and courteous chairmanship of industrial inquiries and royal commissions. His 1978 report into civil liability and compensation for personal injury made proposals for state pensions for accident victims that were largely rejected by government at the time.

== Early life and legal career ==
Born in Minnedosa, Manitoba, Canada, Colin Pearson was the youngest child of Ernest William Pearson (1861–1936), a lawyer, and Jessie Pearson, née Borland (died 1948). He had one brother, who was killed during World War I, and a sister, who died during childbirth. The family moved to London when Pearson was 7, where he was educated at St. Paul's School. He served with the 5th Battalion, Guards Machine Gun Regiment, at the end of the First World War in 1918, before going up to Balliol College, Oxford as a classical scholar and a Jenkyns exhibitioner. He obtained first-class honours in classical honour moderations (1920) and second-class honours in literae humaniores (1922).

Taking up the law, Pearson joined the Inner Temple and was called to the Bar in 1924, where he was a Yarborough Anderson exhibitioner. He was a pupil of Walter Monckton (later the Viscount Monckton of Brenchley) in the chambers of Frederick Temple Barrington-Ward KC. He later joined the chambers of Sir William Jowitt KC where he began to build up a substantial common law practice. When Jowitt became Attorney-General, Pearson was briefed as his junior in many "derating cases" arising from the Rating and Valuation (Apportionment) Act 1928.

Pearson became Junior Counsel (Common Law) to the Ministry of Works in 1930 and Recorder of Hythe in 1937. During World War II, from 1939 to 1945, he worked in the Treasury Solicitor's office. Returning to the Bar after the war, he took silk in 1949. Despite only a modest reputation as an advocate, he was appointed a Justice of the High Court (King's Bench Division) in 1951, receiving the customary knighthood.

== Commission chairman and senior judge ==
In 1958 Pearson chaired a committee to consider the rules for investment of funds paid into court to provide for, among others, widows and children who were awarded compensation. The committee reported in 1959, firmly recommending a less risk averse approach to investment, suggesting investment in equities but with risk sharing between funds. The recommendations led to the Administration of Justice Act, 1965. The only recommendation not implemented was that, where there were no children, funds for widows should continue to be managed by the courts.

In 1960, Pearson was appointed President of the Restrictive Practices Court but in 1961 he was made a Lord Justice of Appeal and sworn to the Privy Council. In 1963 he became Chairman of the Law Reform Committee and was involved in many of the radical law reforms of the 1960s. He was a member of the Supreme Court Rules Committee and led the adoption and assimilation of the recommendations of the Evershed Committee on Practice and Procedure.

In April 1964, Minister of Labour Joseph Godber appointed Pearson chairman of the court of inquiry into the power dispute of 1964. Winning increasing respect, on 18 February 1965, he was made a Lord of Appeal in Ordinary, being created a life peer with the title Baron Pearson, of Minnedosa in Canada and of the Royal Borough of Kensington and Chelsea.

In 1966 he again chaired an inquiry following the seamen's strike of 1966. Pearson's findings were sympathetic to, and supportive of, the seamen's claims for improved conditions and were welcomed by the National Union of Seamen and employers alike. He reprised his role with the civil air transport industry dispute of 1967–1968, the British Steel dispute of 1968 and the docks strike of 1970. From 1971 to 1972 he chaired the Arbitral Body on Teachers' Remuneration.

== Pearson commission on civil liability and compensation ==
In 1973, Pearson was chosen to chair the Royal Commission on Civil Liability and Personal Injury. The commission reported in 1978. Pearson believed that tort's traditional role of compensation had become outdated with the rise of the welfare state since the end of World War II.

He saw the benefits system as having the primary role of providing compensation and security following an accident, and litigation as being secondary. As a result, the commission recommended a no-fault insurance scheme for road traffic and industrial accidents, similar to the subsequent New Zealand Accident Compensation Corporation, and a scheme of strict liability for consumer protection. However, the government's response was cool and the recommendations were not followed up.

== Leading cases as judge ==
- Anisminic v Foreign Compensation Commission (1968);
- Baker v. Willoughby (1969);
- Home Office v. Dorset Yacht Co. (1970).

== Family and other interests ==
On 30 July 1931, he married Sophie Grace Thomas with whom he had a son and a daughter (Lois Jean, later The Hon Mrs Smith as wife of Bishop Robin Smith, suffragan Bishop of Hertford). He was vice-chairman of the council of Bedford College (1959–1962), in succession to his former pupilmaster Lord Monkton, and he did much to help his old school St. Paul's. Pearson became a bencher of the Inner Temple in 1951 and Treasurer in 1974. He retired as a judge in 1974 but occasionally spoke in debates in the House of Lords thereafter. He died in London.

== Bibliography ==
Leigh Rayment's Peerage Pages

- Allen, P (2004) Pearson, Colin Hargreaves, Baron Pearson (1899–1980), Oxford Dictionary of National Biography, Oxford University Press, retrieved 9 April 2008 (Subscription Required)
- Royal Commission on Civil Liability and Compensation for Personal Injury, Stationery Office (1978), Command paper #7054
