= Robin Smith (bishop) =

The Rt Revd Robin Smith MA(Oxon)
- Bishop of Hertford
- Diocese: Diocese of St Albans
- In office: 1990–2001
- Predecessor: Kenneth Pillar
- Successor: Christopher Foster
- Other post: Honorary assistant bishop in St Albans (2001–present)

Orders
- Ordination: c. 1962 (deacon); c. 1963 (priest)
- Consecration: 1990

Personal details
- Born: 14 August 1936 (age 90)
- Denomination: Anglican
- Parents: Richard and Blanche
- Spouse: Lois Pearson (m. 1961)
- Children: 3 sons, 1 daughter
- Profession: Airman
- Education: Worcester College, Oxford

Robin Jonathan Norman Smith (born 14 August 1936) was the Bishop of Hertford from 1990 to 2001.

Smith was educated at Bedford School and Worcester College, Oxford, before beginning his ordained ministry as a curate at St Margaret's Barking, after which he was chaplain of Lee Abbey, then vicar of St. Mary's Church, Chesham, rector of Great Chesham before becoming a bishop. In retirement he is an honorary assistant bishop in the Diocese of St Albans.

Church of England titles
Preceded by Kenneth Pillar	Bishop of Hertford; 1990–2001	Succeeded by Christopher Foster
