= Victor Whitsey =

Anglican bishop (1916–1987)

Hubert Victor Whitsey
- Bishop of Chester
- Diocese: Diocese of Chester
- In office: 1974–1981
- Predecessor: Gerald Ellison
- Successor: Michael Baughen
- Other post: Bishop of Hertford 1971–1974

Personal details
- Born: 21 November 1916
- Died: 25 December 1987 (aged 71)
- Denomination: Church of England
- Occupation: Bishop
- Education: St Edmund Hall, Oxford

Hubert Victor Whitsey (21 November 1916 – 25 December 1987) was a British Church of England bishop. He was Bishop of Hertford 1971–1974 and Bishop of Chester 1974–1981.

== Biography ==
He was born on 21 November 1916 in Blackburn. He was educated at Queen Elizabeth’s Grammar School in Blackburn and, after war service (in the Royal Artillery, rising to the rank of lieutenant colonel), at St Edmund Hall, Oxford University. After Oxford, he attended Westcott House, Cambridge for theological studies. He was ordained as a deacon on 18 December 1949 and appointed a curate in Chorley (St Laurence) in the Diocese of Blackburn. He was ordained as a priest on 1 January 1950, and was appointed as a perpetual curate in Farrington St Paul, in the Diocese of Blackburn a year later on 1 January 1951.

He remained in that post for four years, and on 1 January 1955, he was appointed to the position of a vicar at Halliwell (St Paul) in the Diocese of Manchester. Five years later, on 1 January 1960, he became the curate in charge at Langley St Aidan, again in the Diocese of Manchester, and he remained in this post until 19 October 1964. He was also an honorary canon of Manchester Cathedral appointed on 1 January 1963 and remained in this post until 1 January 1968.

On leaving Langley St Aidan he was appointed as Vicar of Langley All Saints and Martyrs, and then on 1 January 1968 he left Manchester Diocese and returned to Blackburn to become the Vicar of Downham St Leonard. His obituary in the Daily Telegraph stated that he suffered a breakdown in his health in 1968, and that was why he moved to the rural parish of Downham, "where he spent the next three years recuperating."

He was then consecrated as a bishop on 1 November 1971. His first bishopric was as suffragan bishop of Hertford within the Diocese of St Albans (1971–1974). On 22 January 1974 he was appointed as Bishop of Chester, and he remained as bishop until his resignation on 31 December 1981.

The Diocese of Chester is one of the larger dioceses in the country, both in terms of area and the number of parishes (about 270).

The Diocese of Manchester, where Whitsey officiated from 1955 to 1968 is to its north, as is Blackburn, where he officiated from 1950 to the end of 1954, and then again from 1968 to November 1971.

He died in 1987, aged 71.

== Allegations of sexual abuse ==
In 2016–17 Cheshire Constabulary conducted a 13-month investigation called Operation Coverage to investigate allegations that Victor Whitsey had sexually abused persons who were under the age of consent. In October 2017 the force announced that five male and eight female witnesses had alleged they were victims, and that were Whitsey still alive he would have been interviewed in connection with 10 of those 13 allegations.

Slater and Gordon Lawyers represented four of Whitsey's alleged victims. Through Slater and Gordon, one alleged victim stated:

I longed for [Whitsey]'s blessing to achieve my wish of a future as a vicar, serving God and the community. He told me he agreed I had a calling from God. He also told me he had the power to give me everything I wanted in life and the power to take it all away. He then proceeded to abuse me sexually and psychologically. I was powerless to stop him.

The alleged victim, who was a teenage boy at the time, added that as a result he lost his religious faith, started self-harming, and later had a mental breakdown and as a result had attempted suicide.

The ex-Bishop of Chester (retired 2019), Peter Forster, and the ex-Archbishop of the Province of York (retired 2020), John Sentamu, accepted the allegations and issued an apology.

A report into the conduct of Whitsey was published in 2021.

== See also ==
- Anglican Communion sexual abuse cases
- Peter Ball (bishop) – who was convicted in 2015 for sexually abusing boys when he was Bishop of Gloucester in the 1970s and 80s

Church of England titles
Preceded by John Trillo	Bishop of Hertford; 1971–1974	Succeeded by Peter Mumford
Preceded by Gerald Ellison	Bishop of Chester; 1974–1981	Succeeded by Michael Baughen
