= Borehamwood =

Town in southern Hertfordshire, England

Coordinates: 51°39′28″N 0°16′20″W

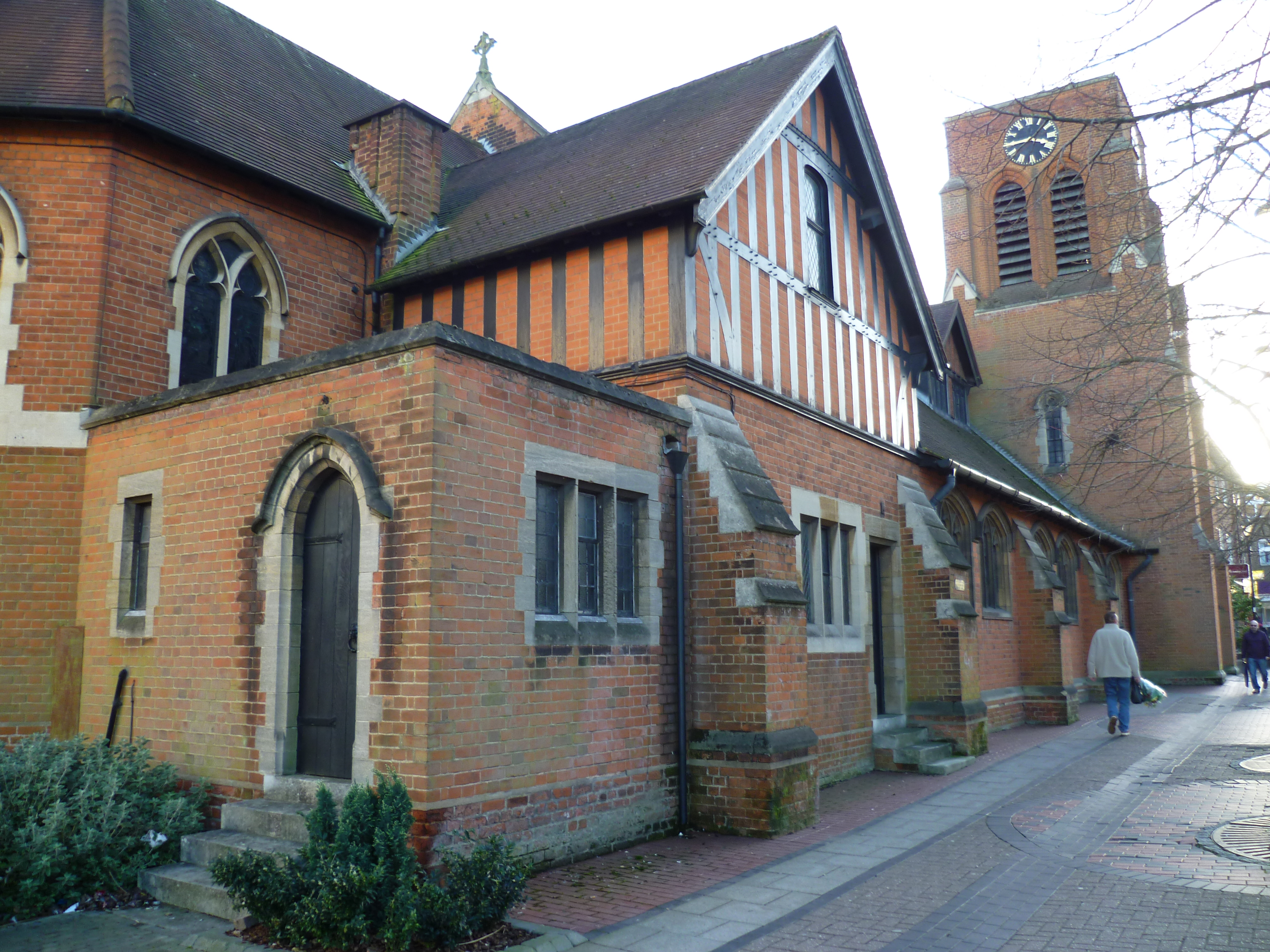
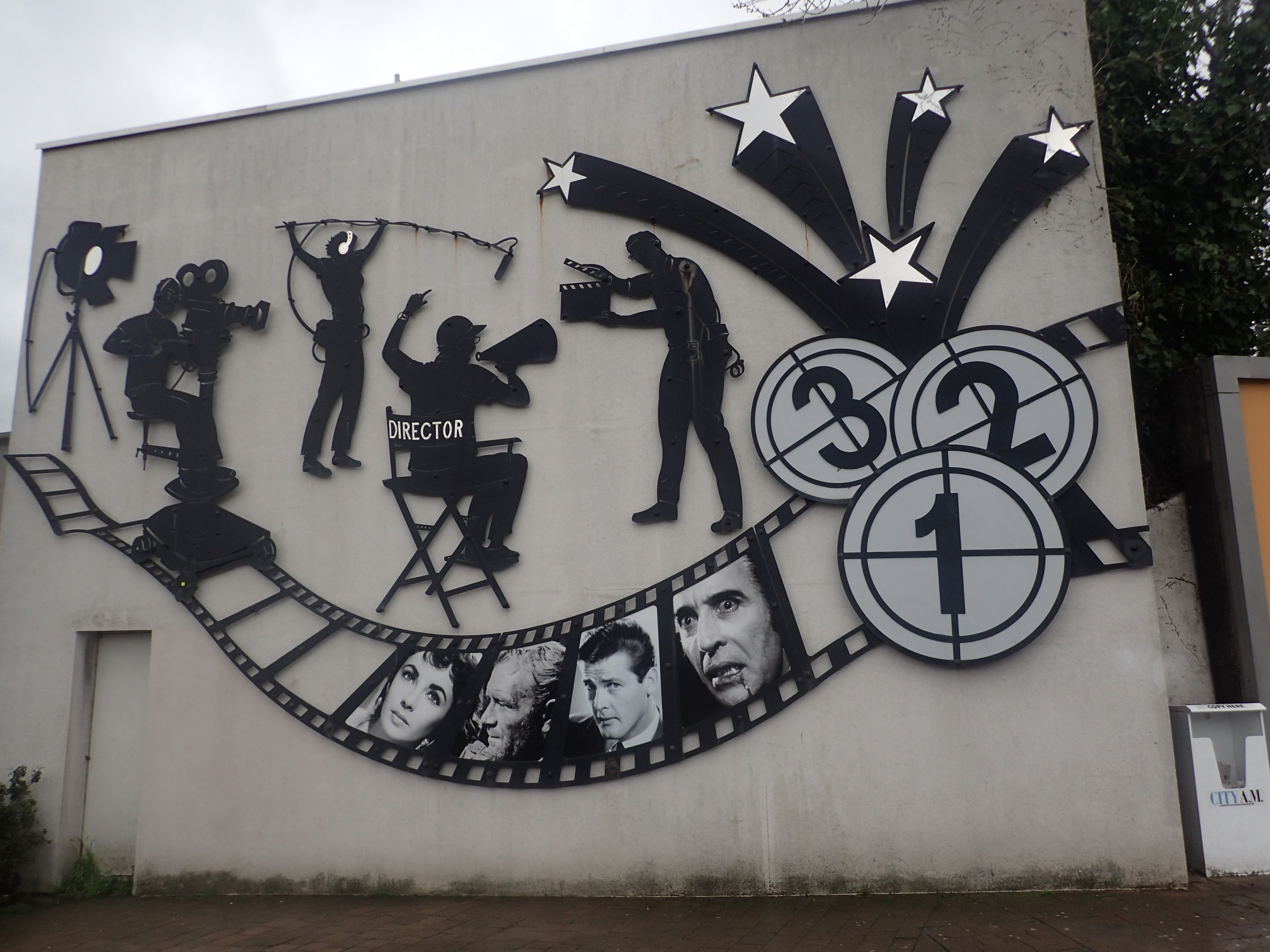
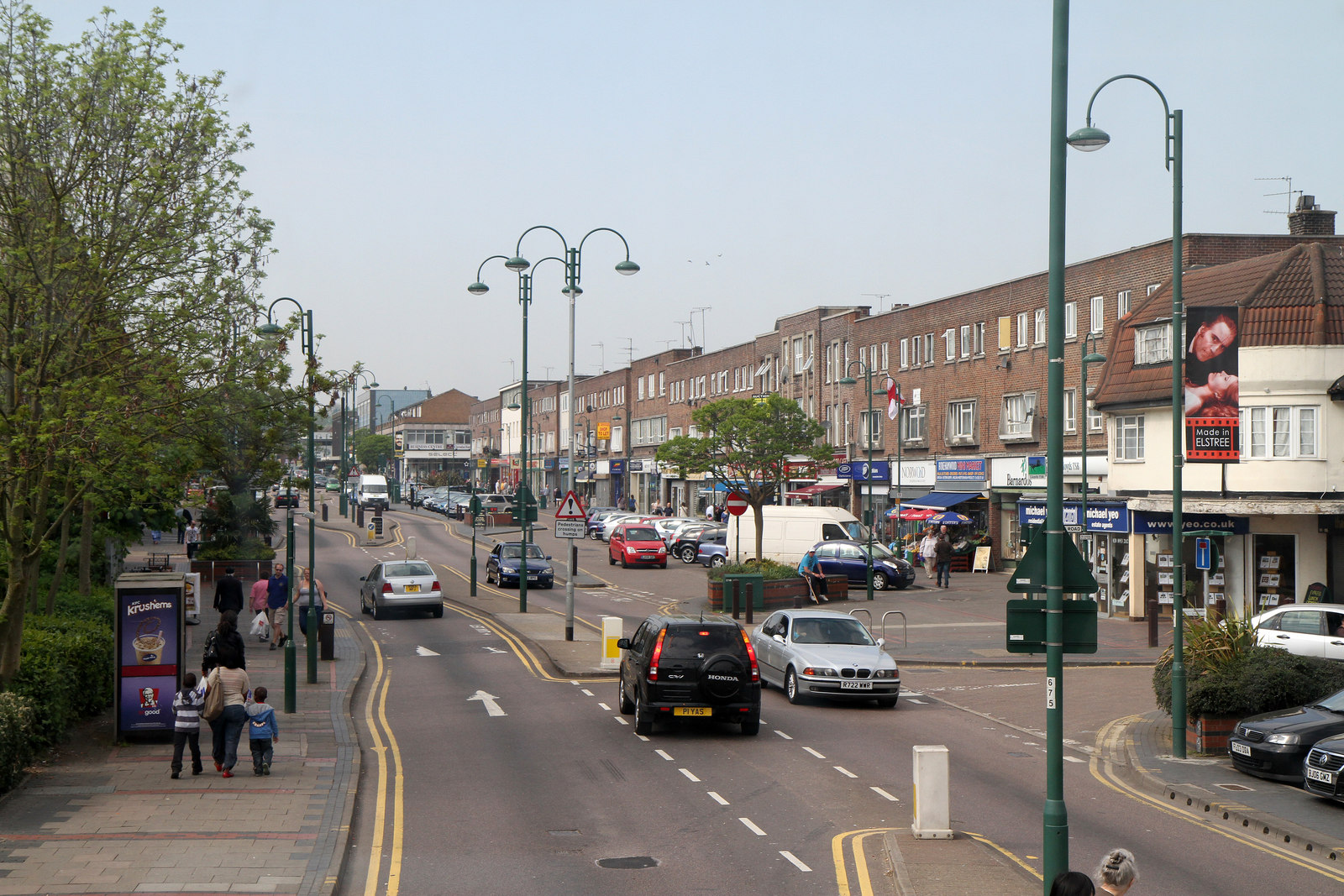
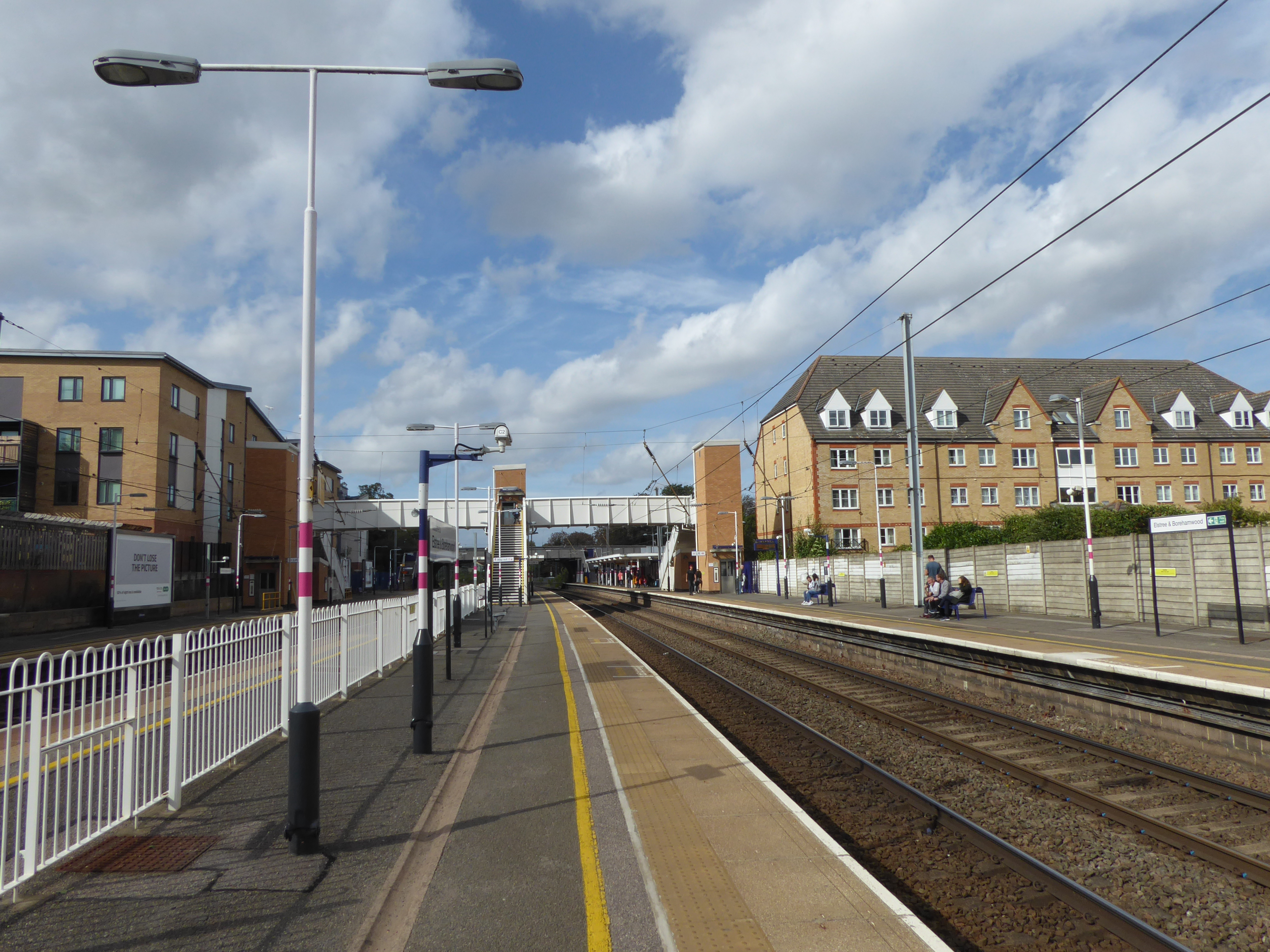
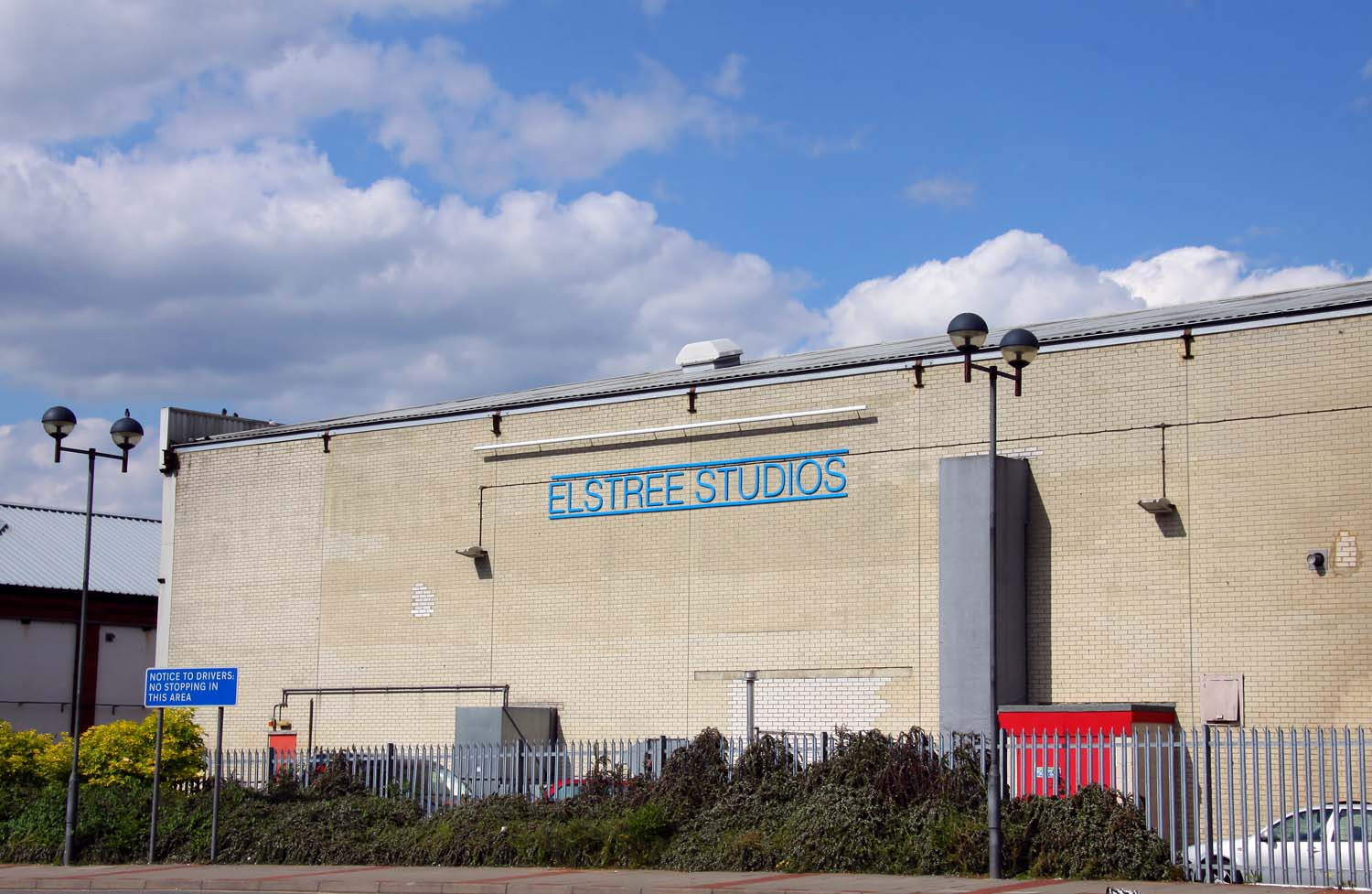
- All Saints Church Filmmaking Mural Shenley Road in the Town Centre Railway Station Elstree Studios

- Location within Hertfordshire
- Population: 36,322
- OS grid reference: TQ195975
- Civil parish: Elstree and Borehamwood
- District: Hertsmere
- Shire county: Hertfordshire
- Region: East
- Country: England
- Sovereign state: United Kingdom
- Post town: BOREHAMWOOD
- Postcode district: WD6
- Dialling code: 020
- Police: Hertfordshire
- Fire: Hertfordshire
- Ambulance: East of England
- UK Parliament: Hertsmere

Borehamwood (/ˌbɔːrəmˈwʊd/, historically also Boreham Wood) is a town in southern Hertfordshire, England, 12 miles (19 km) from Charing Cross. Borehamwood has a population of 36,322, and is within the London commuter belt. The town's film and TV studios are commonly known as Elstree Studios.

== History ==
One of the earliest mentions of Bosci de Boreham (Wood of Boreham), is in 1188:

"In 1188 Pope Clement granted to the kitchen of the monastery the whole land of Elstree. He also gave to the Abbey the wood of Boreham for the feeding of the swine."

In 1776, Parliament enacted:

"An Act for dividing and closing the Common or Waste Ground, called Boreham Wood Common, in the Parish of Elstree otherwise Idletree, in the County of Hertford."

Borehamwood was historically part of the parish of Elstree. A separate ecclesiastical parish of "All Saints, Boreham Wood" was created on 26 February 1909, covering the part of Elstree parish east of the Midland Railway. Despite this change to the ecclesiastical boundaries, Borehamwood remained part of the civil parish of Elstree. The name of the civil parish was changed to Elstree and Borehamwood on 24 February 1982. The ecclesiastical parishes of Borehamwood and Elstree were reunited on 1 April 2005, also under the name "Elstree and Borehamwood".

From the 1920s onwards, the town became known as one of the main centres of the UK film, and later television, industries due to the presence of production studios.

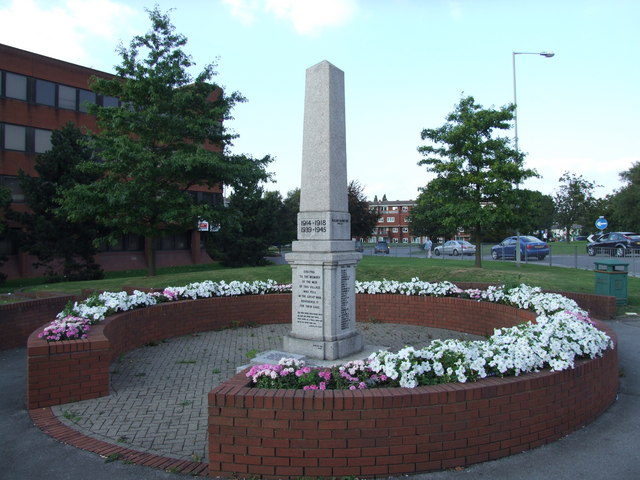
The War Memorial

Following the Second World War, the town's population greatly increased, with large areas of council housing set up for displaced Londoners, many of which are now in private ownership. Fast train connections to central London have resulted in the town becoming a primarily residential suburb. In 1946, the Admiralty started to build highly secret high-performance electronic digital computers at Borehamwood in a redundant wartime factory, firstly for the purpose of real-time gunnery control, and later for surface-to-air guided weapons and missiles, and for specialist cryptography and code-breaking computers for GCHQ.

Borehamwood is currently undergoing a substantial housing transformation which has seen hundreds of new homes built over the last five years. Two further developments are being built and more are expected.

In addition to the studios, the town is home to many retail shops, hotels, restaurants, offices and light industry. The hotels cater mainly to tourists visiting the Elstree Studios, attendees of the television shows being recorded in the Elstree Studios, and London visitors due to the proximity to London and the considerable lower accommodation rates.

There is one weekly newspaper, the Borehamwood & Elstree Times.

== Transport ==
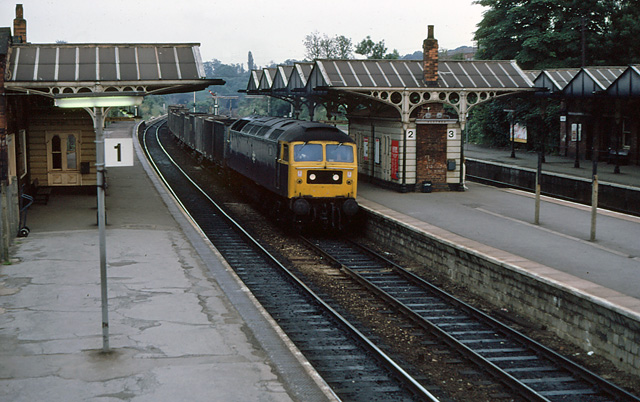
Elstree & Borehamwood Station in 1979

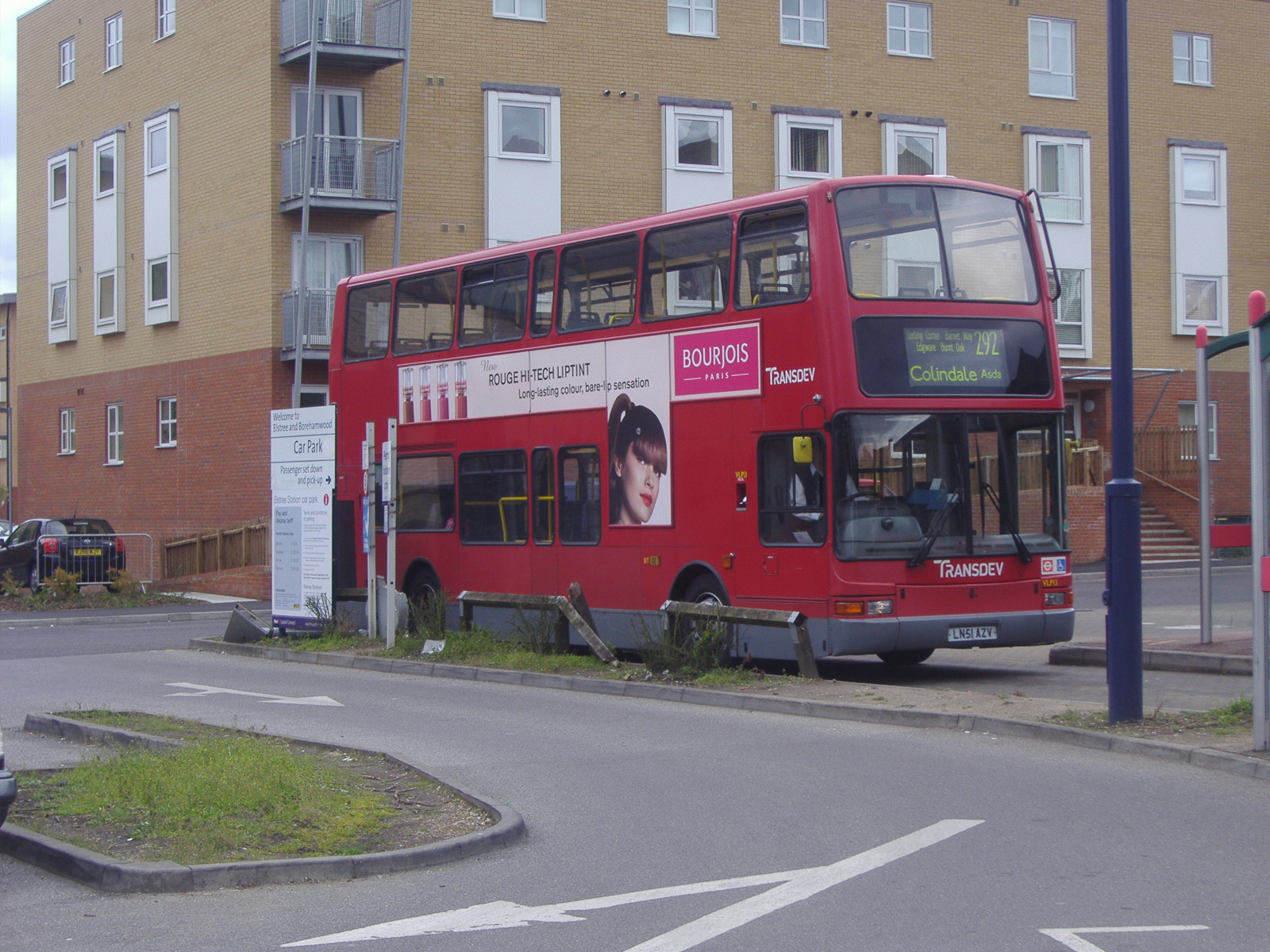
London Buses route 292

On the west side of Borehamwood is Elstree & Borehamwood railway station (TfL Zone 6) served by trains operated by Govia Thameslink Railway on the Thameslink route.

Metroline for London buses runs its number 107 service through the town from New Barnet to Edgware and back. Metroline for London buses also operate Number 292 which goes to Colindale and Rossington Avenue. Uno (Bus Company) run a bus service that stops at Borehamwood (route 601) going to Welwyn Garden City via St Albans and back. The 644 service also runs from Hatfield to Queensbury via Borehamwood. Intalink operate a bus service to other parts of Hertfordshire.

The A1 road passes just to the east of the town, and the M25 motorway passes about two miles (three kilometres) north of it.

== Demographics ==
In the 2011 census, the population was 31,955; this rose to 36,322 in 2021, an increase of 13.67%. Borehamwood is the most populated town in Hertsmere, ahead of Bushey. The Jewish community numbers in excess of 6,100, up from just 3,900 in 2011; combined with neighbouring Elstree, the community counts around 8,000 individuals.

Area	All people	Christian (%)	Buddhist (%)	Hindu (%)	Jewish (%)	Muslim (%)	Sikh (%)	Other (%)	No religion (%)	Not stated (%)
England and Wales	56,490,048	46.3	0.5	1.8	0.5	6.7	0.9	0.6	36.7	6.0
Borehamwood	36,322	42.25	0.62	3.33	16.96	3.82	0.11	0.86	25.53	6.24

== Film industry ==
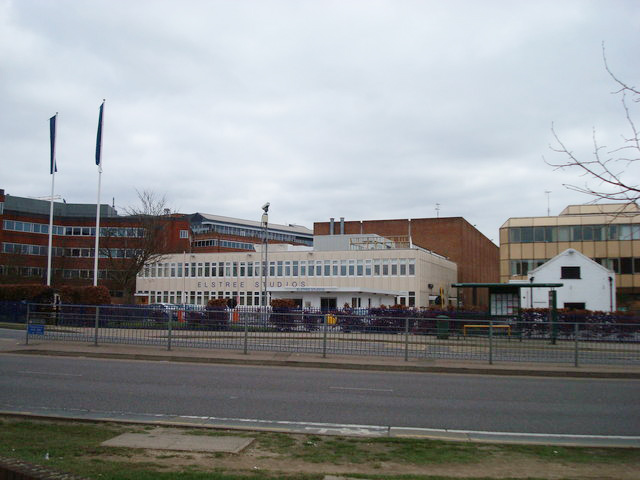
Elstree Film Studios

Studios and former studios in Elstree and Borehamwood
1. New Elstree Studios (1955–62)
2. Gate Studios (1928–57)
3. BBC Elstree Centre (1914–)
4. Elstree Film Studios (1925–)
5. Imperial Studios (1929–36)
6. MGM-British Studios (1935–70)
7. Studio 2000 (1993–)
8. Sky Studios Elstree (2023-)

Since the 1914, the town has been home to several film studios and many shots of its streets are included in final cuts of 20th century British films. This earned it the nickname of the "British Hollywood". Whilst most of these studios, collectively known as "Elstree Studios", have now closed, two still remain.

Many films were shot at the studios on Shenley Road including The Dam Busters (1955), Star Wars (1977, and subsequent films in the franchise), Moby Dick (1956), Summer Holiday (1963), and The Shining (1980) starring Jack Nicholson, some of the Indiana Jones films. The facility was partly demolished in the 1980s to make way for a Tesco Extra supermarket on one side and an office block complex on the other.

The area between the supermarket and the office blocks is all that remains of the original studio, which has been much reduced in size and usefulness to production companies as a result. The Shenley Road Studios were later used for the TV series Who Wants to Be a Millionaire? and Big Brother, as well as several major feature films. The Inspector Morse TV series' production offices were based in the studios and, although the series was set in Oxford, several exterior locations (banks, shops etc.) were filmed in the streets of Borehamwood.

The former British National Studios off Clarendon Road, referred to locally as "The Douglas Fairbanks studios" (which were bought by Lew Grade's ATV in May 1958), are now the BBC Elstree Centre. The studios have, over the years, been home to Alfred Hitchcock's film Blackmail, Jim Henson's TV series The Muppet Show was also produced there, and now BBC's popular soap, EastEnders, and their medical drama Holby City. An episode of Judge John Deed included scenes of the Tesco Extra, but with Borehamwood crossed out and Lewes written in its place.

Several other studios including the Gate Studios and the Danziger Studios at nearby Elstree have been demolished. The Metro-Goldwyn-Mayer British Studios complex (demolished in the early 1970s) saw the production of many films, including 2001: A Space Odyssey (1968), Where Eagles Dare (1968) and Goodbye, Mr. Chips (1969), as well as ITV television series such as The Prisoner (1967–68).

The newer Millennium Studios were situated on Elstree Way, Borehamwood.

== Notable companies ==
The UK headquarters of Pizza Hut restaurants is based in the town, the head office of the delivery portion having moved to nearby St Albans in 2015; and, until 2003, so were the headquarters of the United Kingdom subsidiary of T-Mobile, with both being based in the office blocks standing on part of what used to be the old Elstree Studios. Regent Inns has its head office on Elstree Way. George Wimpey also has offices within the town. Since 2015, Borehamwood has also been home to the UK subsidiary of the olive oil brand Filippo Berio.

== Notable people ==
- Ray Davies (born 1944), primary songwriter, singer, rhythm guitarist and pianist for The Kinks; producer and actor; owned a house in Borehamwood, used as his primary residence during the 1960s.
- Den Dover (born 1938), former Member of the European Parliament, lives in Borehamwood.
- Prof. Angus Charles Graham (1919–1991), Professor of Classical Chinese, London University, 1971–84, lived in Borehamwood.
- Sir Robert Holland (c. 1283–1328), nobleman, was murdered in Borehamwood on 15 October 1328.
- Tim Sherwood, former footballer and manager.
- James Hay Stevens (1913–1973) Aviation journalist, editor of Aircraft Engineering (1945–1957), illustrator and pilot, lived in Borehamwood. He developed the 1:72nd scale model used by Airfix and other toy manufacturers.
- John Frederick Tayler (1802–1889), watercolour painter, and President of the then-Old Society, was born on 30 April 1802 in Borehamwood.
- Nethra Tilakumara (born 1999), actress, grew up in Borehamwood.

== Sport and recreation ==
The first third of the Watling Chase Timberland Trail stretches from Elstree & Borehamwood railway station up to Shenley. South of the town is a large area of grassland and trees called Woodcock Hill Village Green. Section 16 of the London Outer Orbital Path (London Loop) runs adjacent to the town, starting in Elstree and through Scratchwood towards the London Borough of Barnet.

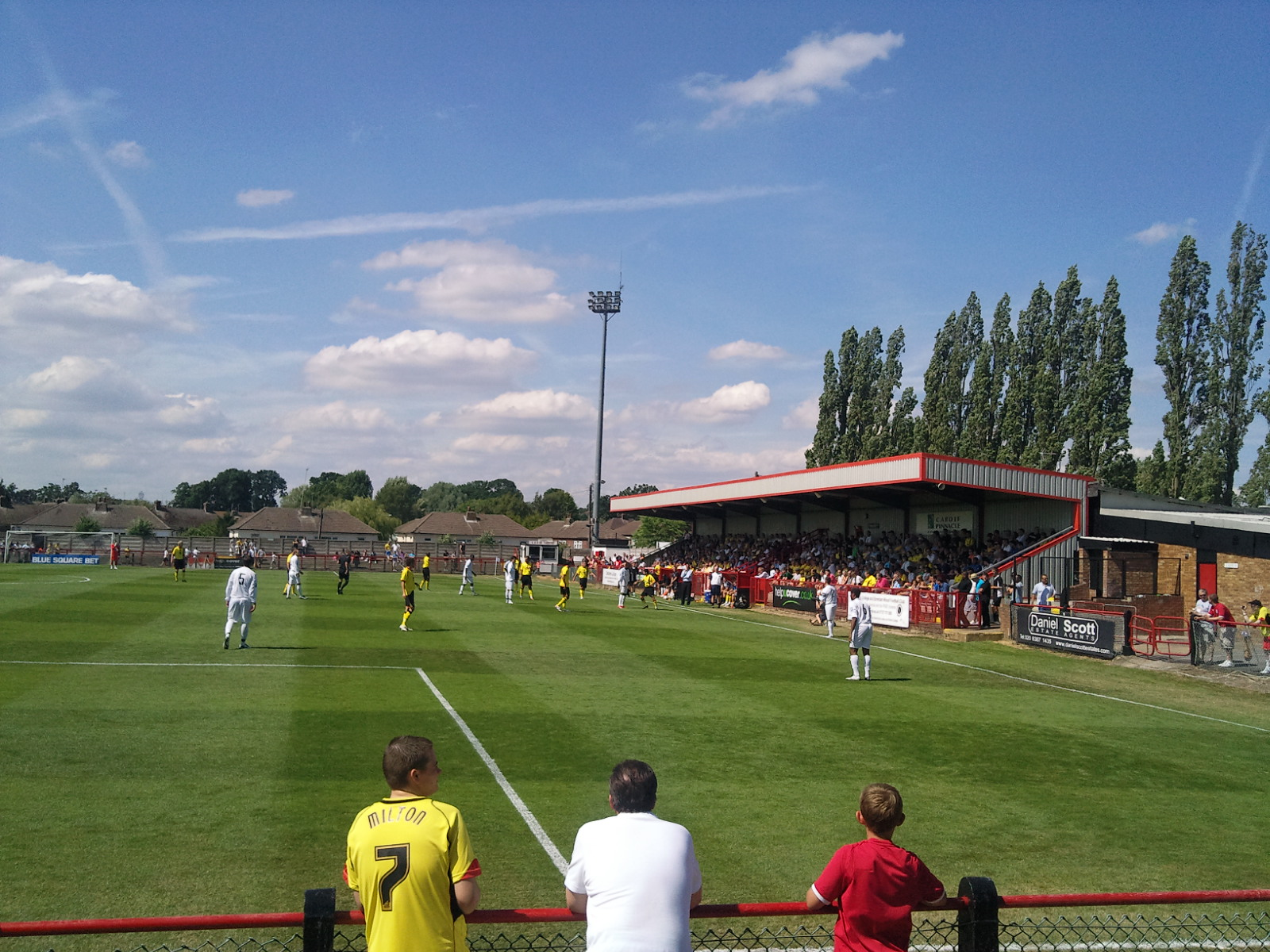
Meadow Park stadium

Borehamwood is home to Boreham Wood FC and Watford FC Reserves who play their home games at Meadow Park. Arsenal previously played at Meadow Park before moving to Emirates Stadium in 2024 for league matches. They still play some other matches there. There are several parks in the area. Aberford Park is featured with the source of the brook which has been artificially made to look like a lake. Meadow Park includes a large playing field, tennis courts and basketball courts.

Borehamwood has a large shopping area called Borehamwood Shopping Park, featuring large retail stores.

The hamlet of Well End has a notable pub, the Mops and Brooms, reputedly the site of a battle between travellers and village folk. Adjacent to the pub is a much older building: Nelson Cottage (c.1600) is now a private residence but was the original Mops and Brooms alehouse. It was renamed the Lord Nelson c.1840–50 and traded under that name until its closure in 1932 and replacement by the current pub, which eventually reverted to the older name.

== Media ==
Borehamwood is within the BBC London and ITV London region. Television signals are received from the Crystal Palace TV transmitter and the local relay transmitter situated in Hemel Hempstead.

The town is served by both BBC Radio London and BBC Three Counties Radio. Other radio stations include Heart Hertfordshire and Radio Verulam.

The Borehamwood & Elstree Times is a privately owned, online-only local newspaper covering the local and adjacent area. The Town Crier is a quarterly, council-run community publication for Elstree & Borehamwood residents.

== Education ==
Borehamwood has a number of primary schools, including, St. Teresa's (RC) Primary School, Cowley Hill Primary School, Woodlands Primary School, Parkside Primary School, Yavneh Primary School and Meryfield Primary School. Secondary schools include Hertswood Academy, Elstree Screen Arts Academy and Yavneh College. Independent schools include Haberdashers' Aske's Boys', Girls' and Aldenham schools.

Oaklands College has a site in Borehamwood, where it offers a small range of full and part-time courses.

The TV series Grange Hill was filmed at Hillside School in Borehamwood (as well as BBC Elstree Centre) from 1985 to 1990.

== Nearby towns and villages ==
- Arkley
- Barnet Gate
- Edgware
- Elstree
- High Barnet
- Mill Hill
- Ridge
- Radlett
- Shenley
- Stanmore
- Well End
- Aldenham

== Twin towns ==
Borehamwood is twinned with:

- Fontenay-aux-Roses, France
- Offenburg, Germany
- Shoham, Israel

== In popular culture ==
- Borehamwood is the town upon which one of three maps is based in the game Urban Dead. This map was released as part of the promotional campaign for the release of British writer Charlie Brooker's Dead Set (set in the Big Brother house in Borehamwood).

== Climate ==
Borehamwood experiences an oceanic climate (Köppen climate classification Cfb) similar to almost all of the rest of the United Kingdom.

Climate data for Boreham Wood
Month	Jan	Feb	Mar	Apr	May	Jun	Jul	Aug	Sep	Oct	Nov	Dec	Year
Mean daily maximum °C (°F)	8 (46)	9 (48)	12 (54)	14 (57)	18 (64)	21 (70)	23 (73)	23 (73)	20 (68)	16 (61)	11 (52)	8 (46)	15 (59)
Mean daily minimum °C (°F)	5 (41)	5 (41)	6 (43)	8 (46)	10 (50)	13 (55)	15 (59)	16 (61)	13 (55)	11 (52)	8 (46)	5 (41)	10 (50)
Average precipitation mm (inches)	50.7 (2.00)	39.9 (1.57)	31.7 (1.25)	46.2 (1.82)	38.9 (1.53)	46.4 (1.83)	33.1 (1.30)	43.6 (1.72)	49.7 (1.96)	70.7 (2.78)	58.1 (2.29)	56.9 (2.24)	565.9 (22.28)
