= Gina Radford =

UK Anglican cleric and former public health physician

The Reverend Gina Radford
- Born: 25 April 1955 (age 71); Surrey, England
- Religion: Christianity (Anglican)
- Church: Church of England
- Ordained: 2016
- Congregations served: St Petrocs and St Marys
- Website: stpetrocsandstmarys.org

Georgina Margaret Radford (born 25 April 1955) is a British priest in the Church of England and a former public health physician. Since June 2019, she has been team vicar in the Dart and Avon Mission Community in South Brent, Devon, in the Diocese of Exeter.

Having changed her career from the public physical and mental health provision, during the COVID-19 pandemic in 2020, she was initially drawn back into her traditional field as a doctor, but found that her new calling was particularly suited in ministering to spiritual needs when also considering the sudden wider physical health symptoms which could result in long-term psychological changes, and has contributed to advising on the church's response to the pandemic.

== Early life and education ==
Radford was born on 25 April 1955. She was educated at Guildford County School, then an all-girls grammar school. She studied medicine at the Royal Free Hospital School of Medicine, graduating with Bachelor of Medicine, Bachelor of Surgery (MB BS) degrees in 1979.

== Career ==
=== Health professional ===
Prior to her ordained ministry, Radford was a public health physician who was the Deputy Chief Medical Officer for England from 2015 to 2019.

Radford led on the Department of Health's response to the early-2000s Shipman Inquiry and represented the Chief Medical Officer on the World Health Organization's Western Pacific Regional Committee.

After leaving the Department of Health in 2007, Radford was Director of Public Health in Fife, Director of Public Health for East of England and Centre Director for Anglia and Essex for Public Health England.

Radford was a keynote speaker at a 2017 rare diseases conference organised by the Royal College of Paediatrics and Child Health.

In November 2020, Radford was confirmed as a trustee of the UK National Organisation for Fetal alcohol spectrum disorder.

Radford also broadcasts on television, acts as an expert opinion in health matters, and is a governor of Marjon University in Plymouth, Devon, England.

=== Ordained ministry ===
Radford trained for ordination with the Eastern Region Ministry Course on a part-time basis from 2014 to 2016. She was ordained in the Church of England as a deacon in 2016 and as a priest in 2017. She was a curate at St James' Church, Lode, in the Diocese of Ely from May 2016 to 2019. She was installed as team vicar of St Petroc's Church, South Brent, Devon in June 2019.
