= Kenneth Pillar =

Kenneth Harold Pillar (10 October 1924 – 21 February 2011) was the Bishop of Hertford from 1982 until 1989.

Pillar was born on 10 October 1924 and educated at Devonport High School for Boys and Queens' College, Cambridge before beginning his ordained ministry as a curate in Childwall. He had been made a deacon on Trinity Sunday 1950 (4 June) and ordained priest the Trinity Sunday following (20 May 1951) — both times by Clifford Martin, Bishop of Liverpool After his title, he was chaplain of Lee Abbey and then vicar of St Paul's Beckenham. He then held further incumbencies at Canterbury and Waltham Abbey before becoming a bishop. He was consecrated a bishop on 2 February 1982, by Robert Runcie, Archbishop of Canterbury, at Westminster Abbey. In retirement he was an honorary assistant bishop in the Diocese of Sheffield.

Church of England titles
Preceded by Peter Mumford	Bishop of Hertford; 1982–1989	Succeeded by Robin Smith
