= Michael Beasley (bishop) =

British Anglican bishop (born 1968)

The Right Reverend Dr Michael Beasley
- Bishop of Bath and Wells
- Diocese: Diocese of Bath and Wells
- Elected: 29 June 2022
- Installed: 12 November 2022
- Other posts: Director of Mission, Diocese of Oxford (2010–2015); Bishop of Hertford (2015-2022)

Orders
- Ordination: 1999 (deacon); 2000 (priest)
- Consecration: 14 May 2015 by Justin Welby

Personal details
- Born: Noel Michael Roy Beasley; 1968 (age 57–58)
- Denomination: Anglicanism
- Spouse: Lizzie
- Children: Two
- Profession: Epidemiologist
- Education: Sir Graham Balfour School
- Alma mater: Imperial College London; Oriel College, Oxford; Durham University

Noel Michael Roy Beasley (born 1968) is a British Church of England bishop and epidemiologist. Since June 2022, he has been the Bishop of Bath and Wells; he was enthroned and started active ministry in that role in November 2022. From May 2015 to June 2022, he was Bishop of Hertford, a suffragan bishop in the Diocese of St Albans. From 2003 to 2010, he worked at Westcott House, Cambridge, an Anglican theological college, first as chaplain and then as a tutor and the college's vice-principal. During this time, he was also an academic of Imperial College London. From 2010 to 2015, he was Director of Mission for the Diocese of Oxford.

== Early life and education ==
Beasley was born in 1968, and brought up in rural Staffordshire. From 1983 to 1987, he was educated at Sir Graham Balfour School, a state school in Stafford, Staffordshire. He studied at Imperial College London and graduated in 1991 with a Bachelor of Science (BSc) degree. He then undertook post-graduate study at Oriel College, Oxford, completing his Doctor of Philosophy (DPhil) degree in 1996. He later became an epidemiologist specialising in child infectious diseases in low-income countries.

After completing his doctorate, Beasley studied theology at St John's College, Durham. He graduated with a Bachelor of Arts (BA) degree in 1998. He then trained for the priesthood at Cranmer Hall, the theological college attached to St John's College, which he completed in 1999. Until 2010, he combined scientific work half time with work as a missioner and theology teacher.

== Ordained ministry ==
Beasley was ordained in the Church of England as a deacon in 1999 and as a priest in 2000. From 1999 to 2003, he served as an assistant curate at St Nicholas Church, Newport, Shropshire, in the Diocese of Lichfield.

From 2003 to 2007, Beasley was chaplain of Westcott House, Cambridge, an Anglican theological college. Remaining at Westcott House, he was a tutor in mission and the college's vice-principal from 2007 to 2010. His positions at Westcott House were part-time and he combined these with work at Imperial College London. There, he worked as Director of the Partnership for Child Development in the Department of Infectious Disease Epidemiology. One of his projects was a 2008 film titled Courage and Hope: African Teachers Living Positively With HIV which tried to address the stigma of HIV/AIDS in Africa.

In 2010, Beasley was appointed Director of Mission for the Diocese of Oxford. In this position he worked throughout the diocese with churches across the spectrum of Anglican churchmanship. In 2014, he was appointed an honorary canon of Christ Church Cathedral, Oxford.

=== Episcopate ===
In March 2015, it was announced that Beasley would succeed Paul Bayes as Bishop of Hertford, a suffragan bishop of the Diocese of St Albans. On 14 May 2015, he was consecrated as a bishop by Justin Welby, the Archbishop of Canterbury, during a service at Westminster Abbey. He took up the appointment on 16 May during a service at St Albans Cathedral.

On 28 April 2022, it was announced that Beasley would be the next Bishop of Bath and Wells, the diocesan bishop of the Diocese of Bath and Wells; his confirmation of election took place at Lambeth Palace on 29 June 2022. At his installation on 12 November at Wells Cathedral, he gifted 1,000 hazel saplings to guests as a sign of working for change, to offer shelter to birds and creatures, and capture carbon.

He took part in the 2023 Coronation as one of the two Bishops Assistant to King Charles III, alongside the Right Reverend Paul Butler, Bishop of Durham.

Beasley was named in the media as one of the main candidates to be the next and 106th Archbishop of Canterbury; instead, Sarah Mullally was selected.

=== Views ===
Beasley voted in favour of the introduction of blessings for same-sex couples by the Church of England in February 2023, and in November of that year voted to approve "standalone services for same-sex couples" on a trial basis.

== Personal life ==
Beasley is married to Lizzie, a deputy head teacher. They have two children.
