= Woodcock Hill Village Green =

Coordinates: 51.646°N 0.273°W

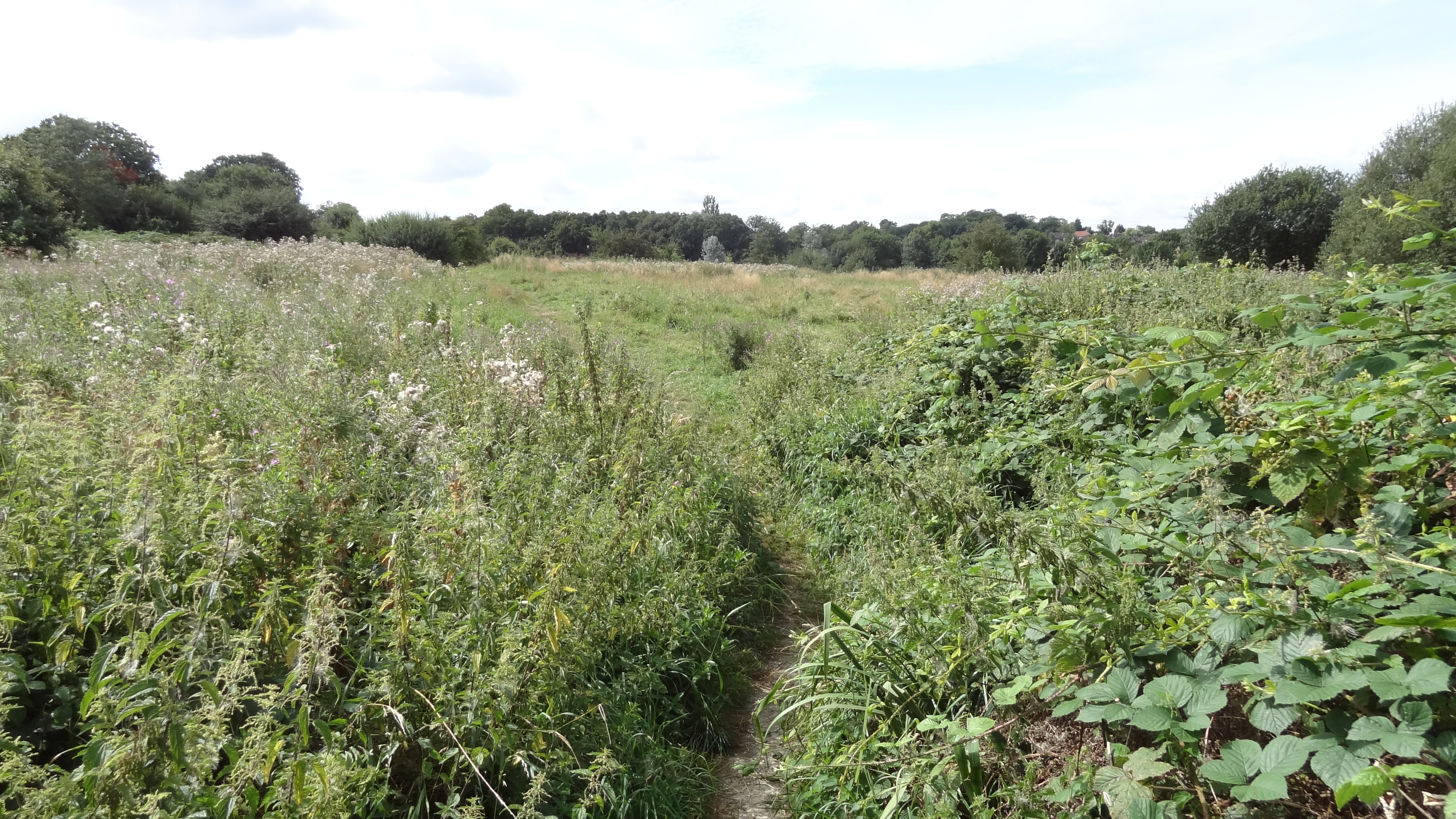
Woodcock Hill

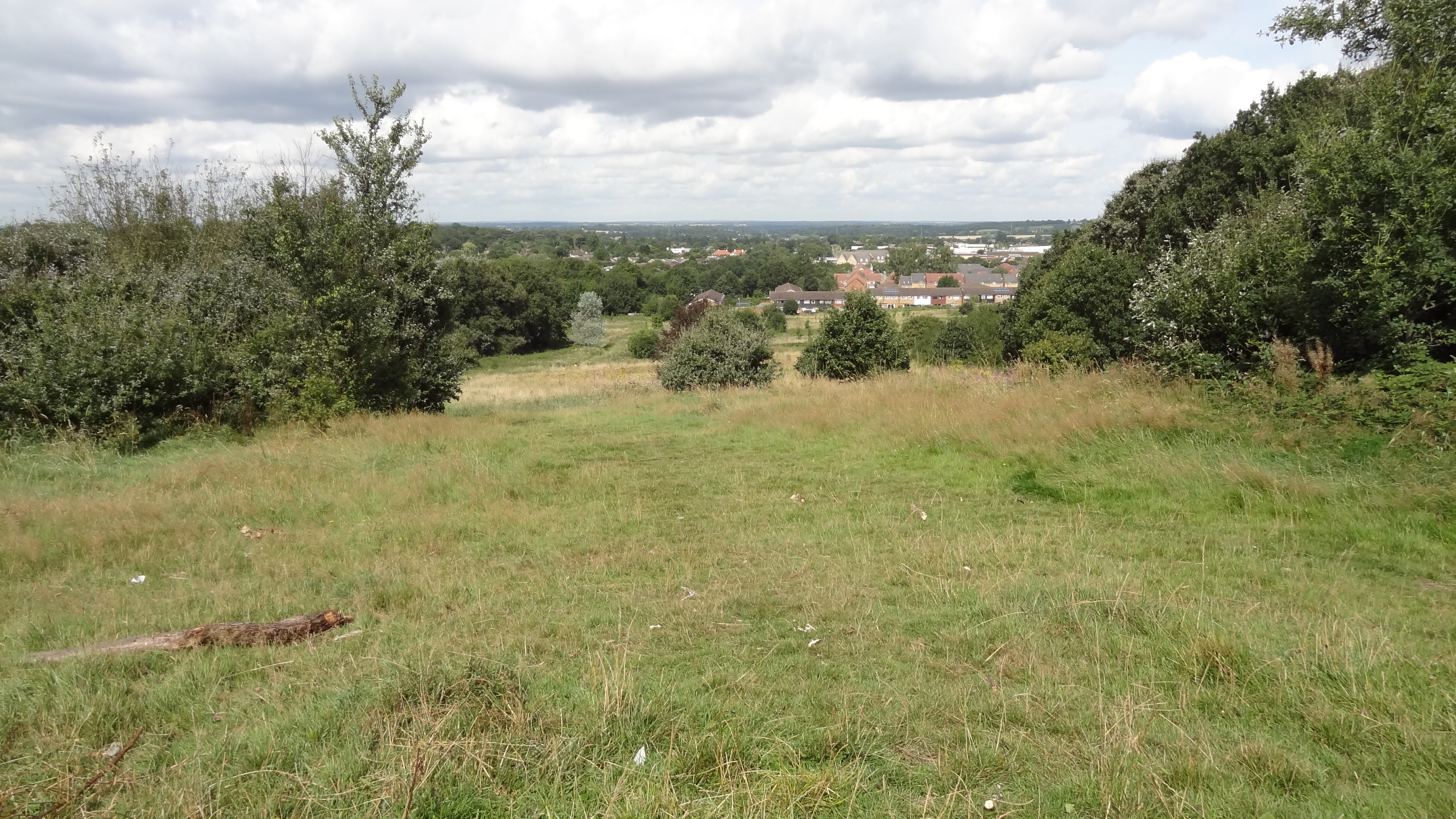
View north from the top of Woodcock Hill

Woodcock Hill Village Green or Woodcock Hill Open Space is an area of grass and woodland in Borehamwood in Hertfordshire in England. It was designated a Village Green in 2008 to prevent development of the site.

== History ==
Woodcock Hill was first recorded as land donated by Offa, king of Mercia in the late eighth century, to St Albans Abbey. During the Dissolution of the Monasteries in 1539 the leading courtier Sir Anthony Denny acquired the land from King Henry VIII. In 1588 it was the location of one of the chain of beacons used to warn of the approach of the Spanish Armada, and during the Napoleonic Wars it was one of the Admiralty's chain of telegraph stations, sending messages to Hampstead Heath to the south and St Albans to the north. In the 1860s two railway tunnels were built at Woodcock Hill, and clay from the tunnels was used to make brick for local houses.

== Battle against development ==
In 1959 the Woodcock Hill Society was formed to fight against development of the site, and it later merged with the Elstree & Borehamwood Green Belt Society. In 1996 the land was identified as possible for development and a new organisation, Woodcock Hill Open Space Forever (WHOSE), was formed to protect it. In 2004 Hertsmere councillor and WHOSE chair Patricia Strack applied to Hertfordshire County Council to have the area declared a Village Green under the Commons Registration Act 1965, which would permanently protect it against development. A public enquiry in November 2007 found in favour of the application, and the County Council ratified Woodcock Hill as a Village Green on 9 July 2008. In December of the same year the committee of WHOSE formed the Woodcock Hill Village Green Trust.

== Boundaries ==
The site is bounded by Barnet Lane to the south, the railway line to the west, and Vale Avenue and Carrington Avenue to the north.
