= Sir Graham Balfour School =

Location
- North Avenue; Stafford, Staffordshire, ST16 1NR; England
- Coordinates: 52°49′41″N 2°07′30″W

Information
- Type: Academy
- Motto: Learning, Working, Succeeding Together
- Local authority: Staffordshire
- Department for Education URN: 142983 Tables
- Ofsted: Reports
- Headteacher: Matthew Mason
- Gender: Coeducational
- Age: 11 to 18
- Houses: Chetwynd, Sandon, Tixall, Weston, Shugborough
- Colours: Green, yellow, red, white and purple
- Website: https://www.sirgrahambalfour.co.uk

Sir Graham Balfour School is a coeducational secondary school and sixth form located in Stafford, England. It is named after Graham Balfour, son of the Victorian statistician, who became Director of Education in Staffordshire.

The original school was demolished in 2001, with the new school building being constructed and completed in 2002. It achieved specialist Maths and Computing School status from September 2006. The school converted to academy status in September 2016. As of June 2021, the school is building a new set of classrooms, behind the sports hall, which will soon be where modern foreign languages (French, Spanish and German) will be taught.

Sir Graham Balfour School also offers post-16 education. The sixth form is an integral part of the Stafford Collegiate which involves all Stafford High Schools and Stafford College.

On 22 July 2016 David Wright retired as Head Teacher and Lesley Beck took over. In July 2022, Lesley Beck became CEO of the Trust and Matthew Mason took over.

== Controversy ==
In May 2005, then-headteacher David Hill banned charity wristbands due to uniform regulations. This resulted in some students protesting on the school tennis grounds. Police were called after students began leaving the school grounds. Hill later retracted the ban on the bands.

== Notable alumni ==
- Michael Beasley (bishop), bishop and epidemiologist
- Morgan Gibbs-White, footballer
