= Power dispute of 1964 =

The power dispute of 1964 was an industrial action by electric power workers in the United Kingdom that raised fears of power cuts which were ultimately averted through negotiation with the employers.

Unions representing 128,000 manual workers demanded:

- Reduction in working time from a 42- to 40-hour week;
- An increase in annual paid holiday from two to three weeks;
- More long-service pay;
- Examination of pay rates for craftsmen and their mates.

— threatening an overtime ban and work-to-rule if the demands were not met. Their employers, represented by the Electricity Council, rejected the demands claiming that a three-year pay agreement had been put in place the previous year.

The unions involved were:

- Amalgamated Engineering Union;
- Electrical Trades Union;
- National Union of Enginemen, Firemen, Mechanics and Electrical Workers;
- National Union of General and Municipal Workers; and
- Transport and General Workers Union.

The unions were under pressure to settle from the Labour Party, and were called to talks at Westminster with deputy party leader George Brown and shadow Chancellor James Callaghan who feared for the impact a dispute would have on the party's prospects in the 1964 United Kingdom general election. Talks broke down on 19 March and it was feared that supply disruptions would follow the industrial action. Further talks on 25 March failed. There were parliamentary clashes between Labour Party leader Harold Wilson and Minister of Labour Joseph Godber.

On 31 March, Godber appointed Lord Justice Pearson to chair a court of inquiry into the dispute. The inquiry reported on 15 May and found fault on both sides. The employers had been guilty of "slowness and lack of vigour" in addressing the workers' concerns, while the workers had acted "too hastily" in breaking the three-year agreement which already included a mechanism for negotiation on "status proposals". However, the inquiry recognised that the workers felt "disappointed, frustrated and exasperated". Some felt that the report contained "more platitudes than recommendations" and it suggested no compromise, exhorting the parties to renewed efforts under the existing agreement.

On 11 June, the employers conceded a pay rise that cost the industry an estimated £5 million annually (£64 million at 2003 prices) in return for improvements in efficiency, and agreed to negotiate on the remaining issues. Negotiations again broke down on 27 November and unions announces that industrial action would begin and that they would start balloting for a strike.

The dispute was called off on 30 November when the employers offered that excess hours worked would be compensated in cash if time-off in lieu was not taken within three months. The wage claim was arbitrated by the Industrial Court.
