= Bishops' College, Cheshunt =

Coordinates: 51.7034°N 0.0478°W

Bishops' College, Cheshunt was an Anglican theological College set up to train clergy to serve in the Church of England. It was housed in buildings formerly used by a non-conformist college that moved to Cambridge in 1905. It operated from 1909 until 1968. Since then, they have been used as local government buildings. Its principal from 1955 to 1963 was John Trillo.
