= Eastern Region Ministry Course =

The Eastern Region Ministry Course (ERMC), based in Cambridge, is a part-residential theological training course which offers initial ministerial training on behalf of the Church of England. It used to offer this for the Methodist Church in Britain, the United Reformed Church, and occasionally other churches in England. These other Churches have now withdrawn from partnerships in regional training courses. Students typically attend the course for two or three years.

== Overview ==
The ERMC was formed in September 2005 as an amalgamation of the former East Anglian Ministerial Training Course and part of the former St Albans and Oxford Ministry Course. Students tend to come from the Eastern region of England and the dioceses covered are: Ely, Norwich, St. Edmundsbury and Ipswich, St. Albans, Peterborough and Europe. Students thus come from the counties of Norfolk, Essex, Suffolk, Cambridgeshire, Bedfordshire, Luton, Hertfordshire and Northamptonshire (or parts thereof). ERMC also takes students from Diocese in Europe of the Church of England, which covers the continental Europe. ERMC offers the academic content of Reader (Licensed Lay Minister) training for the dioceses of Norwich, Ely, St. Albans and St. Edmundsbury and Ipswich. Students from a broad spectrum of church traditions are represented on the course, and worship on the course is very varied, some services led by staff but often by students. At March 2016, there were approximately 60 ordinands studying on ERMC and about 60 trainee Readers, making ERMC the largest member of the Cambridge Theological Federation.

Students usually study for awards validated by Durham University, namely either the certificate, diploma or BA in theology for mission and ministry or the MA in theology. These programmes offered are part of the Common Award system. As a part-residential course, training is offered in two different forms of a dispersed learning mode: either through attendance of evening classes in the Cambridge, Norwich or St Albans centres, or by means of an online live class using Adobe Connect. There are six residential weekends per annum as well as an eight-day summer school. In addition, full-time contextual students study additional modules at the context hub in Cambridge.

The current principal of the ERMC is the Revd Dr. Alexander S. Jensen. The former principal, Canon Dr. Ian McIntosh, left in 2015 to become Head of Formation at the Church of England Ministry Division.

== Notable alumni ==
List of notable alumni of the Eastern Region Ministry Course or its predecessors:

- Gina Radford; former Deputy Chief Medical Officer for England

== Notable staff ==
List of notable staff of the Eastern Region Ministry Course or its predecessors:

- Christine Hardman; Course Director of the St Albans and Oxford Ministry Course (1991–1996)
- Trevor Jones; Chairman of the St Albans and Oxford Ministry Course (1998–2007), Vice-chair of the Eastern Region Ministry Course (2005–2016)
- Joy Tetley; Principal of the East Anglian Ministerial Training Course (1993–1999)
