= Trevor Jones (priest) =

First Archdeacon of Hertford

Trevor Pryce Jones (born 24 April 1948) was the first Archdeacon of Hertford within the Diocese of St Albans. He was collated into that post in September 1997.

Jones was an assistant teacher and lay chaplain at Shaftesbury Grammar School from 1969 to 1973. Ordained as a deacon in 1976 and priest in 1977, Jones previously served as Assistant Curate at the church of St George in Lower Tuffley in Gloucestershire from 1976 to 1979, and Warden of Bishop Mascall Centre in Ludlow from 1979 to 1984. In addition, he was a member of the Hereford Diocesan Education Team from 1979 to 1984; diocesan communications officer for Hereford from 1981 to 1986; a team rector for the Hereford South Wye Team Ministry from 1984 to 1997; officiating Chaplain to the Forces from 1985 to 1997, and Prebendary of Hereford Cathedral from 1993 to 1997.

In 1997 Jones was appointed to the newly created post of Archdeacon of Hertford and an Honorary Canon of St Albans Abbey; his responsibilities within the diocese included "educational issues and ecumenical relations and responsibility for oversight of the Board for Christian Development, covering clergy training, education, and youth and children's work."

His other responsibilities included acting as Chairman of the St Albans and Oxford Ministry Course from 1998 to 2007; the bishops' selector from 2001 to 2008; a member of the General Synod of the Church of England from 2000 to 2005 and 2006 to 2010; a member of the Church of England Legal Advisory Committee from 2006 to 2011; Chairman of the St Albans Diocese Reach Out Projects from 1997 to 2009; the Chairman of the Rural Strategy Advisory Group (RUSTAG) from 2001 to the present; the Vice-Chair of the Eastern Region Ministry Course 2005 to the present; Chairman of Reach Out Plus from 1999 to 2012, and a member of the Ecclesiastical Law Society since 1997. Jones led the service of remembrance on the first anniversary of the Potters Bar railway disaster.

His wife Sue is the Head of Religious Studies at Bishop's Hatfield Girls' School. From 2005 to 2012, Jones was also the Chairman of the Trustees of The Hockerill Foundation, a charity which makes grants in the field of education.

Jones retired as Archdeacon of Hertford on 31 August 2016.
