= Guildford County School =

Location
- Farnham Road; Guildford, Surrey, GU2 4LU; United Kingdom
- 51.23428°N 0.58532°W

Information
- Type: Academy
- Established: 1905
- Department for Education URN: 139193 Tables
- Ofsted: Reports
- Headteacher: Steve Smith
- Staff: approx. 60
- Gender: Mixed
- Age: 11 to 18
- Enrolment: 1,049
- Houses: Tudor; York; Windsor; Stuart; Hanover; Lancaster
- Colours: Red and navy blue
- Patron: Julian Lloyd Webber, Howard Goodall
- Website: guildfordcounty.co.uk

Guildford County School (GCS) is a co-educational day school on Farnham Road (A31), Guildford, England, 200 metres from Guildford town centre. It has around 1050 students enrolled, including the Sixth Form. It is run by its headmaster Steve Smith.

The school first opened as an all girls' grammar school in 1905. In September 2004, the school was granted Specialist Music College status, designated by the Department for Education and Skills. Julian Lloyd Webber and Howard Goodall are patrons of the school. The school was then granted academy status in 2013.

== History ==
=== Grammar school ===
The school opened the gates in 1905 at its first premises on Nightingale Road and then moved in 1906 to its current site at Farnham Road. A Block is the oldest building and more buildings were added during the following sixty-nine years.

=== Comprehensive ===
In 1977, the girls' grammar school became a mixed 11-18 comprehensive school. Between 1977 and 1979, a second teaching block was built together with another gymnasium (the 'New Gym').

The school became grant-maintained in September 1990 and three years later a three-storey building named "Cobbett Block" after the former Chairman of Governors was opened by the then MP David Howell alongside the Headmaster David Smith. The school became a Foundation School in 2000 and an Academy School in 2013.

== Notable former pupils ==
- Gina Radford, Deputy Chief Medical Officer for England (2015 to 2019)
- Katie Lam, Conservative Member of Parliament since 2024
