= Peter Mumford (bishop) =

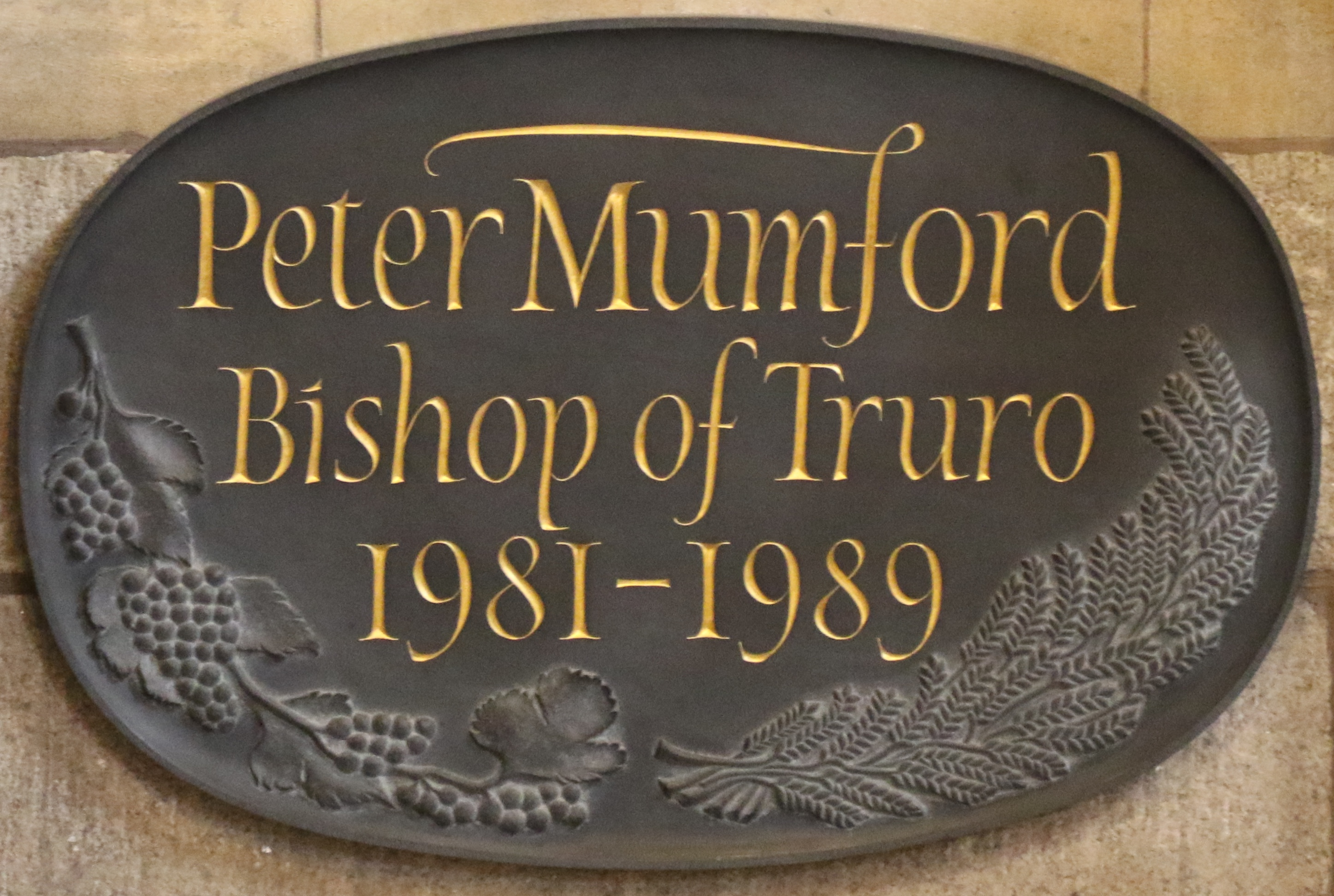
Memorial in Truro Cathedral

Peter Mumford (14 October 1922 – 1992) was a bishop of the Church of England. He was the Bishop of Hertford from 1974 to 1981 and the Bishop of Truro from 1981 to 1989.

Mumford was educated at Sherborne School and University College, Oxford. After Second World War service with the Royal Artillery he began his ordained ministry as a curate at St Mark's church, Salisbury. He was then the vicar of St Andrew's Bedford, the rector of Crawley and finally, from 1973 until his ordination to the episcopate, the Archdeacon of St Albans. He married Jane and they had two sons and a daughter: his wife survived him.

Mumford wrote an autobiography, including "reflections", called Quick-eyed Love Observing (the title alludes to a poem by George Herbert), which was published after his death.

Mumford failed to take action or to launch an investigation into Jeremy Dowling, who was later convicted of sex offences against boys. A review in 2018 found that "There is no doubt that there were a number of missed opportunities for the diocese of Truro to undertake its own investigations into the allegations made in 1972 against Jeremy Dowling."

Church of England titles
Preceded by Victor Whitsey	Bishop of Hertford; 1974–1981	Succeeded by Kenneth Pillar
Preceded by Graham Leonard	Bishop of Truro; 1981–1989	Succeeded by Michael Ball
