= All Saints church, Borehamwood =

Church in Hertfordshire, England

Coordinates: 51.6559°N 0.2750°W

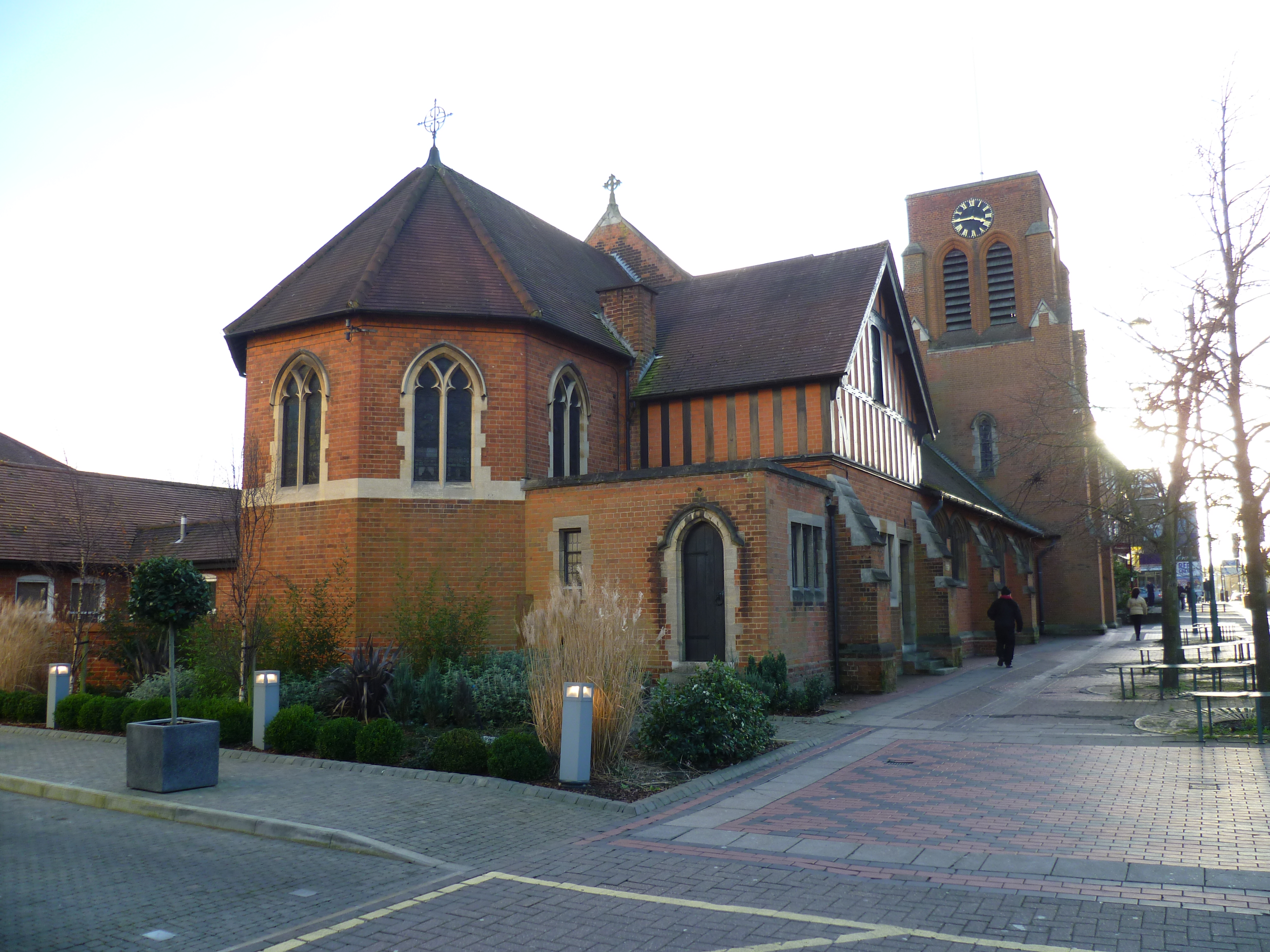
All Saints church, Borehamwood.

All Saints church is a Church of England church in Shenley Road, Borehamwood. It is in the parish of Elstree and Borehamwood. The church is built in the Jacobean style and dates from 1909.
