= Bishop of Hertford =

Anglican suffragan bishop in England

The Bishop of Hertford is an episcopal title used by a suffragan bishop of the Church of England Diocese of St Albans, in the Province of Canterbury, England. The suffragan See was created by Order in Council of 5 July 1889, but remained dormant until first filled in December 1967. The title takes its name after Hertford, the county town of Hertfordshire. The suffragan Bishop of Hertford, along with the suffragan Bishop of Bedford, assists the diocesan Bishop of St Albans in overseeing the diocese; the bishop has oversight of the archdeaconries of Hertford and St Albans, which cover the deaneries & parishes of Hertfordshire.

The current Bishop of Hertford is The Right Reverend Dr Jane Mainwaring, who took office upon her consecration on 2 February 2023; she is the first woman to hold the office.

== List of bishops ==
Bishops of Hertford
From	Until	Incumbent	Notes
1889	1967	in abeyance	
1967	1971	John Trillo	(1915–1992). Translated from Bedford; later to Chelmsford
1971	1974	Victor Whitsey	(1916–1987). Translated to Chester
1974	1981	Peter Mumford	(1922–1992). Translated to Truro
1982	1989	Kenneth Pillar	(1924–2011)
1990	2001	Robin Smith	(b. 1936)
2001	Sept 2010	Christopher Foster	(b. 1953). Translated to Portsmouth
2010	23 July 2014	Paul Bayes	(b. 1954) Previously National Mission and Evangelism Adviser; translated to Liverpool
16 May 2015	29 June 2022	Michael Beasley	(b. 1968) Translated to Bath & Wells.
2023	present	Jane Mainwaring	(b. 1970) previously Archdeacon of St Albans; consecrated 2 February 2023
