= Diocese of St Albans =

Diocese of the Church of England

Coordinates: 51.752°N 0.339°W

Diocese of St Albans Dioecesis Sancti Albani
- Coat of arms

- Flag

Location
- Ecclesiastical province: Canterbury
- Archdeaconries: Bedford, Hertford, St Albans

Statistics
- Parishes: 335
- Churches: 411

Information
- Cathedral: St Albans Cathedral
- Language: English

Current leadership
- Bishop designate: Andrew Paul Rumsey
- Suffragans: Richard Atkinson, Bishop of Bedford; Jane Mainwaring, Bishop of Hertford
- Archdeacons: Janet Mackenzie, Archdeacon of Hertford; Dave Middlebrook, Archdeacon of Bedford; Charles Hudson, Archdeacon of St Albans

Website
- stalbans.anglican.org

The Diocese of St Albans forms part of the Province of Canterbury in England and is part of the wider Church of England, in turn part of the worldwide Anglican Communion.

The diocese is home to more than 1.6 million people and comprises the historic Counties of Hertfordshire and Bedfordshire, or in terms of local government areas, Bedfordshire, Luton, Hertfordshire and parts of the London Borough of Barnet. It therefore ranges from small rural communities in villages and hamlets to major urban centres like Luton, Bedford, Watford and Hemel Hempstead, and includes suburban areas on London's outer reaches.

== History ==
The diocese was founded by an Order in Council on 30 April 1877, implementing the Bishopric of St Albans Act 1875.

The diocese was established from parts of the large Diocese of Rochester, extending the new bishop's jurisdiction over more than 600 parishes in the two counties of Essex and Hertfordshire. (These two counties had only been part of Rochester diocese since 1846; before then Essex had been in London diocese, and Hertfordshire had been split between London and Lincoln dioceses.)

The first Bishop of St Albans was Thomas Legh Claughton, who served from 1877 to 1890.

The see is in the City of St Albans, where the cathedra (bishop's seat) is located in St Albans Cathedral. The cathedral building itself dates from 1077. It was an abbey church (part of St Albans Abbey) prior to its dissolution in 1539, and then a parish church (purchased by the town in 1553) until its elevation to cathedral status in 1877.

In 1914, the new Diocese of Chelmsford was formed, removing Essex from the St Albans diocese. A few months later the county Archdeaconry of Bedford was added from the Diocese of Ely, thereby providing the diocese substantially with its current boundaries.

The suffragan bishopric of Bedford was revived in 1879 and again in 1935 and that of Hertford was created in 1968.

== Current geographical limits and structure ==
The diocese currently includes:

- the county of Bedfordshire
- the county of Hertfordshire
- parts of the London Borough of Barnet

The diocese is overseen by the Bishop of St Albans, whose cathedra (or seat) is in St Albans Cathedral. He is supported in his pastoral work in the diocese by two suffragan bishops, the Bishop of Hertford and the Bishop of Bedford as well as three archdeacons.

The diocese is divided into three archdeaconries, which are in turn divided into 20 area or rural deaneries.

Diocese	Archdeaconries	Deaneries
Diocese of St Albans	Archdeaconry of Bedford	Deanery of Ampthill & Shefford
Diocese of St Albans	Archdeaconry of Bedford	Deanery of Bedford
Diocese of St Albans	Archdeaconry of Bedford	Deanery of Biggleswade
Diocese of St Albans	Archdeaconry of Bedford	Deanery of Dunstable
Diocese of St Albans	Archdeaconry of Bedford	Deanery of Luton
Diocese of St Albans	Archdeaconry of Bedford	Deanery of Sharnbrook
Diocese of St Albans	Archdeaconry of Hertford	Deanery of Barnet
Diocese of St Albans	Archdeaconry of Hertford	Deanery of Bishop's Stortford
Diocese of St Albans	Archdeaconry of Hertford	Deanery of Buntingford
Diocese of St Albans	Archdeaconry of Hertford	Deanery of Cheshunt
Diocese of St Albans	Archdeaconry of Hertford	Deanery of Hertford & Ware
Diocese of St Albans	Archdeaconry of Hertford	Deanery of Stevenage
Diocese of St Albans	Archdeaconry of Hertford	Deanery of Welwyn & Hatfield
Diocese of St Albans	Archdeaconry of St Albans	Deanery of Berkhamsted
Diocese of St Albans	Archdeaconry of St Albans	Deanery of Hemel Hempstead
Diocese of St Albans	Archdeaconry of St Albans	Deanery of Hitchin
Diocese of St Albans	Archdeaconry of St Albans	Deanery of Rickmansworth
Diocese of St Albans	Archdeaconry of St Albans	Deanery of Saint Albans
Diocese of St Albans	Archdeaconry of St Albans	Deanery of Watford
Diocese of St Albans	Archdeaconry of St Albans	Deanaery of Wheathampstead

The diocesan offices are located in Holywell Hill in St Albans.

== Bishops ==
The Bishop of St Albans (vacant) leads the diocese, and is assisted by the Bishops suffragan of Bedford (Richard Atkinson) and of Hertford (Jane Mainwaring). The suffragan see of Bedford was created by the Suffragan Bishops Act 1534 but went into abeyance after one incumbent; that see was next filled in the late 19th century and has been in near-constant use again since 1935. The See of Hertford was created by Order in Council of 5 July 1889, but remained dormant until first filled in December 1967.

Alternative episcopal oversight (for parishes in the diocese which reject the ministry of priests who are women) is provided by the provincial episcopal visitor, Norman Banks, Bishop suffragan of Richborough, who is licensed as an honorary assistant bishop of the diocese in order to facilitate his work there. There are also several former bishops living in the diocese who are licensed as honorary assistant bishops:

- 2001–present: Robin Smith, retired Bishop suffragan of Hertford, lives in Redbourn.
- 2013–present: Stephen Venner, retired Bishop of Dover, former Bishop for the Falkland Islands and Bishop to the Forces, lives in St Albans, itself. Venner is also licensed in the Diocese of Rochester and Diocese in Europe.
- Also, John Gladwin (retired Bishop of Chelmsford) lives in Wheathampstead, but there is no evidence that he is licensed as an honorary assistant bishop.

== Archdeacon of Hertford ==
In the late 11th/early 12th century, Nicholas, an archdeacon of Lincoln diocese, was called "Archdeacon of Cambridge, Huntingdon and Hertford.

The Archdeaconry of Hertford was created by Order in Council on 1 January 1997 from the eastern parts of the Archdeaconry of St Albans, which at the time was one of the largest archdeaconries in England. There have been only two Archdeacons of Hertford since the archdeaconry's institution: the first, Trevor Jones, who retired on 31 August 2016; and the incumbent, Janet Mackenzie, who was collated on 6 September 2016.

- 1997 to 2016: Trevor Jones
- 2016 to present: Janet Mackenzie

== Churches ==
Outside deanery structures: St Albans Cathedral

=== Archdeaconry of Hertford ===
Deanery of Barnet: Arkley (St Peter), Barnet St John the Baptist, Barnet St Stephen, Barnet Vale (St Mark), Borehamwood All Saints, Borehamwood Holy Cross, Borehamwood St Michael & All Angels, East Barnet (St Mary the Virgin), Elstree (St Nicholas), Little Heath (Christ Church), Lyonsdown (Holy Trinity), New Barnet (St James), Potters Bar King Charles the Martyr, Potters Bar St Mary & All Saints, Ridge (St Margaret), South Mimms (St Giles), Totteridge (St Andrew)

Deanery of Bishop's Stortford: Albury (St Mary the Virgin), Bishop's Stortford Holy Trinity, Bishop's Stortford St Michael, Braughing (St Mary the Virgin), Eastwick (St Botolph), Furneux Pelham (St Mary the Virgin), Gilston (St Mary), High Wych (St James the Great), Hockerill (All Saints), Little Hadham (St Cecilia), Little Munden (All Saints), Much Hadham (St Andrew), Perry Green (St Thomas), Sacombe (St Catherine), Sawbridgeworth (Great St Mary), Standon (St Mary), Stocking Pelham (St Mary), Thorley (St James the Great)

Deanery of Buntingford: Anstey (St George), Ardeley (St Lawrence), Ashwell (St Mary the Virgin), Aspenden (St Mary), Baldock (St Mary the Virgin), Barkway (St Mary Magdalene), Barley (St Margaret of Antioch), Benington (St Peter), Brent Pelham (St Mary the Virgin), Buntingford (St Peter), Bygrave (St Margaret of Antioch), Clothall (St Mary the Virgin), Cottered (St John the Baptist), Hinxworth (St Nicholas), Hormead (St Nicholas), Kelshall (St Faith), Meesden (St Mary), Newnham (St Vincent), Reed (St Mary), Royston (St John the Baptist), Rushden (St Mary), Sandon (All Saints), Therfield (St Mary the Virgin), Throcking (Holy Trinity), Walkern (St Mary the Virgin), Wallington (St Mary), Westmill (St Mary the Virgin), Weston (Holy Trinity), Wyddial (St Giles)

== See also ==
- Bishop of St Albans
- List of churches in the London Borough of Barnet
- St Albans Cathedral
