= List of Independent Catholic denominations =

This is a list of Independent Catholic denominations, current and defunct, which identify as Catholic but are not in communion with the Holy See.

== Denominations of Roman Catholic tradition ==
- African-American Catholic Congregation
- Apostolic Catholic Church
- Apostles of Infinite Love
- Argentine Catholic Apostolic Church
- Brazilian Catholic Apostolic Church
- Ecumenical Catholic Church
- Ecumenical Catholic Church of Christ
- Palmarian Catholic Church
- Philippine Independent Church
- Philippine Independent Catholic Church
- Reformed Catholic Church
- Traditionalist Mexican-American Catholic Church
- Venezuelan Catholic Apostolic Church
- Society of Saint Pius X

== Denominations of Old Catholic tradition ==
- American Catholic Church in the United States
- American Catholic Church (1915)
- American National Catholic Church
- Apostolic Episcopal Church
- Community Catholic Church of Canada
- Canonical Old Roman Catholic Church
- Catholic Christian Church
- Christ Catholic Church
- Ecumenical Catholic Communion
- Mexican National Catholic Church
- North American Old Catholic Church
- Mariavite Church
- Old Roman Catholic Church in Great Britain
- Polish National Catholic Church
- Polish-Catholic Church

== Denominations of Liberal Catholic tradition ==
- Catholic Apostolic Church of Antioch
- Liberal Catholic Church, Province of the United States of America
- Liberal Catholic Church International
- The Young Rite

== See also ==
- Episcopi vagantes
