= LGBTQ clergy in Christianity =

The ordination of lesbian, gay, bisexual, transgender, and/or queer (LGBTQ) clergy who are open about their sexuality or gender identity, are sexually active as lesbian, gay, or bisexual, or are in committed same-sex relationships is a debated practice within some contemporary Christian denominations.

While many Christian denominations ban the ordination of sexually active LGBTQ clergy because they view homosexuality as incompatible with biblical doctrine and do not allow those identifying as transgender to be ordained for the same reason, a growing number of churches are allowing openly LGBTQ clergy to serve.

The Metropolitan Community Church, a predominantly LGBTQ church, has ordained LGBTQ candidates for ministry since its founding in 1968. In 1972, the United Church of Christ became the first mainline Protestant denomination in the United States to ordain an openly gay clergy person.

Other churches that allow LGBTQ clergy are the Evangelical Lutheran Church in America, the Presbyterian Church (USA), the Episcopal Church in the United States, the Christian Church (Disciples of Christ), the Church of Scotland, the Church of England, the Church in Wales, the Uniting Church in Australia, the Church of Sweden, the Church of Norway, the Church of Denmark, the Church of Iceland, the Evangelical Lutheran Church of Finland, the Evangelical Church in Germany, the Methodist Church in Britain, the United Methodist Church, the Protestant Church in the Netherlands, the United Protestant Church in Belgium, the Swiss Reformed Church, the United Protestant Church of France, the United Church of Canada, the Evangelical Lutheran Church in Canada, Anglican Church in Canada, the Old Catholic Church, the Czechoslovak Hussite Church and the United Church of Christ in Japan.

== Protestantism ==
=== Progressive Protestant denominations ===
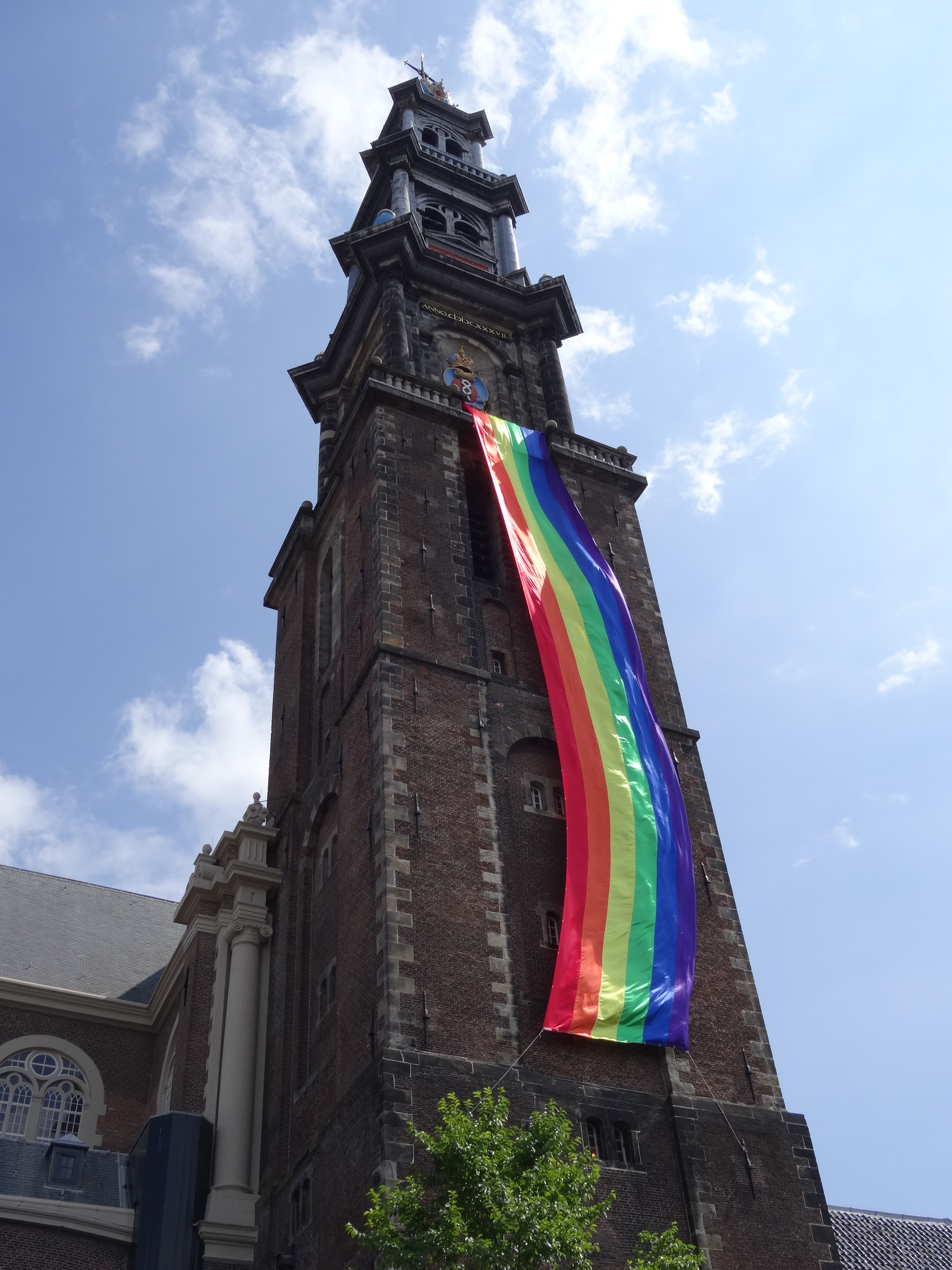
LGBT flag on the Westerkerk of Amsterdam during the Gay Pride 2016

==== Episcopal polities ====
In the United States, the Evangelical Lutheran Church (ELCA) and the Episcopal Church or ECUSA allow the ordination of openly gay, lesbian, bisexual, and/or transgender clergy. In 2012 the Episcopal Church of the United States approved a change to their nondiscrimination canons to include gender identity and expression. In 2026 Micah Cronin became the first openly transgender cathedral dean in the Episcopal Church of the United States, upon being installed dean of All Saints' Cathedral in Milwaukee. The Evangelical Lutheran Church in America decided in August 2009 to accept gay, lesbian, and bisexual clergy in sexually active monogamous relationships. In 2014 Megan Rohrer became the first openly transgender leader of an ELCA congregation (specifically, Grace Evangelical Lutheran Church of San Francisco.)

In July 2011 the Evangelical Lutheran Church in Canada decided to accept gay, lesbian, and bisexual clergy in sexually active monogamous relationships. In 2013, openly gay minister Guy Erwin was ordained as a bishop in California. In 2016, the Anglican Church of Canada elected its first openly gay bishop.

In Scandinavia, the Church of Sweden permits openly gay, lesbian, and bisexual clergy to act as ministers, often in senior positions. In May 2009 the Diocese of Stockholm elected Eva Brunne as its Bishop-Elect. Brunne lives in a same-sex marriage with another woman, and they have a son. Likewise, the Danish National Church, the Church of Norway, the Evangelical Lutheran Church of Finland and the Church of Iceland permit the ordination of openly LGBTQ clergy. In 1993 was lutheran Norway bishop Rosemarie Köhn ordained. She was married with Susanne Sønderbo.

In Germany, the Lutheran, United and Reformed churches as part of the Evangelical Church ordain openly LGBTQ Christian clergy. In 2008, the North Elbian Evangelical Lutheran Church announced that Horst Gorski, who was openly gay, had been nominated as a Lutheran bishop, but he did not make election.

==== Presbyterian polities ====
In the United States, the Presbyterian Church (U.S.A.) allows the ordination of openly gay, lesbian, or bisexual clergy. In 2012, Katie Ricks became the first open lesbian to be ordained in the church.

The Presbyterian Church in America (PCA), the second-largest Presbyterian denomination in the United States, adheres to what they perceive as the biblical stance on homosexuality, affirming that "the act of homosexuality is a sin according to God's Word." Therefore, a practicing homosexual continuing in this sin would not be a fit candidate for ordination or membership in the Presbyterian Church in America.

The Reformed Church in America is another reformed denomination in the US with gay clergy serving congregations. "Some RCA churches have gay pastors, but their ordination is from other denominations."

The Church of Scotland discussed the issue at its 2009 General Assembly. This was in response to the induction of openly gay minister Rev. Scott Rennie, to serve at Queen's Cross Church, Aberdeen. The outcome was agreement that the induction, which had triggered the debate, should go ahead, but that no further such cases should be permitted until a commission on the subject has reported in 2011. In 2011, the Church of Scotland voted at its 2011 General Assembly to allow open gay, lesbian, and bisexual ministers who live in civil unions. On 20 May 2013, the General Assembly of the Kirk approved a proposal to allow gay, lesbian, and bisexual ministers. Parishes will be able to 'opt out' of this new policy. In 2016, the General Assembly voted to allow ministers to enter into same-sex marriages.

==== Connexional polities ====
The United Methodist Church has also been discussing the issue for many years; its official position until May 2018 denied ordination to "Self-Avowed Practicing Homosexuals". On 7 May 2018 the Bishops in the United Methodist Church, a denomination long divided on questions of LGBTQ equality, have proposed allowing individual pastors and regional church bodies to decide whether to ordain LGBT clergy and perform same-sex weddings. As a result of this, and of other affirming policies on the part of select Jurisdictions and Conferences, some regions of UMC in the United States have allowed for the ordination and/or appointment of LGBTQ clergy to pastoral ministry. In 2008, the United Methodist Church Judicial Council ruled that openly transgender pastor Drew Phoenix could keep his position. At the UMC General Conference the same year, several petitions that would have forbidden transgender clergy and added anti-transgender language to the Book of Discipline were rejected. Additionally, the African Methodist Episcopal Church, in full communion with the UMC, currently prohibits its ministers from officiating at same-sex weddings, but it does not have an official policy on gay pastors and, so, some openly gay AME clergy have been ordained.

Yet, in 2016, the New York Annual Conference ordained the United Methodist Church's first openly gay and lesbian clergy. In July 2016, the Western Jurisdiction of the United Methodist Church consecrated the denomination's first openly gay and married bishop, Karen Oliveto.

The United Church of Christ in the Philippines, a denomination that resulted from the merger of several Protestant denominations, has an "openness to ordain openly gay and lesbian church workers."

The Methodist Church of Great Britain "resolved that its previous ruling that there was no reason per se to prevent anyone within the Church, ordained or lay, from entering into or remaining within a civil partnership, should also extend to those entering into legally contracted same-sex marriages."

The Methodist Church of Southern Africa "did not have a rule prohibiting its members or ministers from marrying someone of the same sex, the Western Cape High Court heard on Tuesday." Another court ruled that "The Methodist Church 'tolerates homosexuals' and even accepts same-sex relationships (as long as such relationships are not solemnised by marriage)."

The Methodist Church of New Zealand has ordained openly gay and lesbian pastors since 2004.

==== Congregationalist polities ====
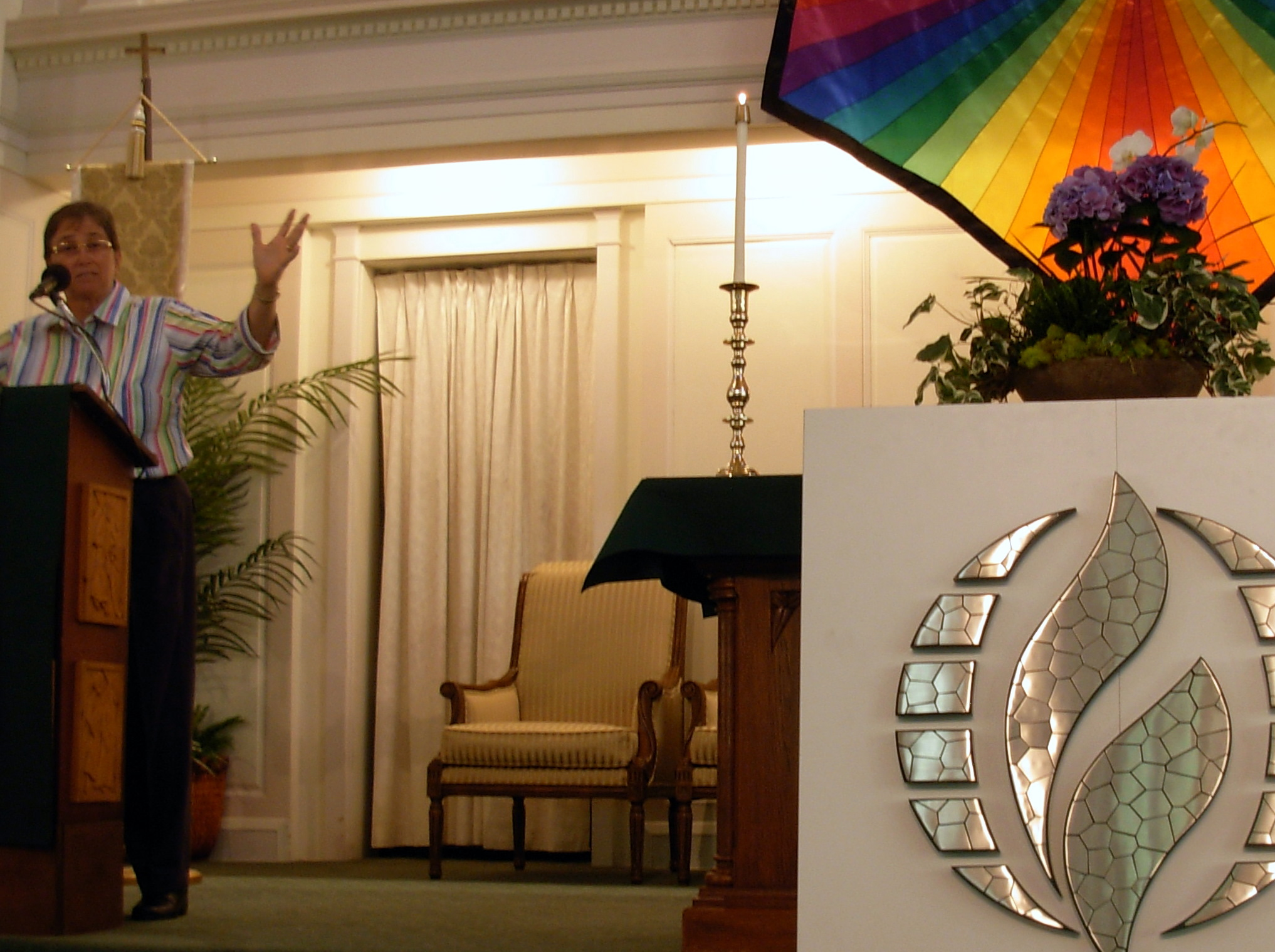
The Metropolitan Community Church logo in front of the altar at a regional conference of the denomination

The Universal Fellowship of Metropolitan Community Churches is the first denomination with an official stance allowing non-celibate gays, lesbians, and bisexuals to be ordained in 1968.

The United Church of Christ began ordaining LGBTQ clergy in the 1970s. The Rev. William R. Johnson was ordained in 1972 and the Rev. Anne Holmes in 1981. The UCC's executive council endorsed ordination of gay and lesbian candidates in 1973 and was the first mainline denomination in the United States to endorse marriage equality (2005). A number of openly gay, lesbian, bisexual and transgender ministers now serve throughout the church.

The United Christian Church decided to ordain openly LGBTQ Christian clergy at First Annual Conference in Seattle, WA in 2010.

The Christian Church (Disciples of Christ) has a decentralized church structure as well. Regional bodies ordain individuals and as such have different rules regarding ordination. Northern California is the only region labeled as Open and Inclusive; however, the Ohio Commission on Ministry (the body that grants ordination) has decided that sexual orientation is not a criterion for ordination. At the 2012 Regional Assemblies, a number of Disciples regions (including Kentucky and Indiana) joined Ohio in eliminating sexual orientation as a restriction for ordination. Other regions are in the process of investigating the matter, mostly on a polity (since congregations determine ethical fitness for candidates and hire their ministers) and not a theological basis. In July 2013, the General Assembly of The Disciples of Christ passed a "Sense of the Assembly" resolution (GA-1327 "Becoming a People of Grace and Welcome to All") to allow ordination clergy "regardless of their sexual orientation or gender identity", although no individual congregation will be forced to ordain LGBT clergy if they object to doing so.

In 1993, the Association of Welcoming and Affirming Baptists was founded in San Jose, California by Baptist churches favorable to the inclusion of LGBT people. In 1996, Lakeshore Avenue Baptist Church in Oakland, California ordained the first openly gay Baptist minister, Randle R. Mixon.

In 2015, two districts of the Mennonite church in the USA had licensed pastors openly in committed same-sex relationships. On 29 May 2022, the Mennonite Church USA voted in favor of the LGBTQ community.

The Liberal Catholic Church, the Swedenborgian Church of North America, the Ecclesia Gnostica, and the Apostolic Johannite Church also do so.

In the Philippines, the Ekklesia Tou Theou (Church of God) believes and ordains LGBT Christian Clergy through its denominational jurisdiction the Catholic Diocese of One Spirit.

==== Mixed or other polities ====
The Moravian Church in North America and Europe allows for the ordination of LGBT+ people.

In 2013, Shannon Kearns became the first openly transgender person ordained by the North American Old Catholic Church, not to be confused with the Catholic Church. He was ordained in Minneapolis. The North American Old Catholic Church disbanded later that year.

Also, in Switzerland the Reformed churches in Federation of Swiss Protestant Churches ordain openly LGBT Christian clergy and the same situation is in Austria in reformed church and Lutheran churches.

The Protestant Church in the Netherlands also ordains openly LGBTQ Christian clergy.

The United Church of Canada and the Uniting Church in Australia already welcome gays, lesbians, and bisexuals in permanent partnerships into the ordained ministry. In addition, on 16 August 2012, the United Church of Canada elected its first openly gay moderator, Gary Paterson, and, in doing so, became the first mainline Christian denomination in the world to have an openly gay person at its helm. The United Church of Christ, because of its decentralized model that arose from the Congregational churches of New England, allows such ordinations by default since there are no official denomination-wide stances on doctrine.

=== Conservative Protestants ===
Conservative Protestants differentiate between homosexual inclination and homosexual activity / behaviour. These denominations also interpret the Bible as condemning homosexual activity / behaviour. Conflicts over that issue became public in United Methodist Church and in the Southern Baptist Convention.

The ordination of gays, lesbians, and bisexuals is not a new thing, but their ordination as openly gay, lesbian, and bisexual people has caused controversy among some churchgoers: a 2006 survey suggested that two-thirds of weekly Protestant church-goers in the United States of America believe that it is inappropriate for gays and lesbians to serve as bishops or pastors; with the number opposed rising to 80% amongst evangelical Christians (bisexuality and transgenderism were not mentioned in the survey). In the past, ordinands who were gay, lesbian, or bisexual did not admit their sexuality, and were ordained.

== Anglicanism ==
For many years, moderate and liberal western Anglican provinces operated on a basis of "don't ask, don't tell".

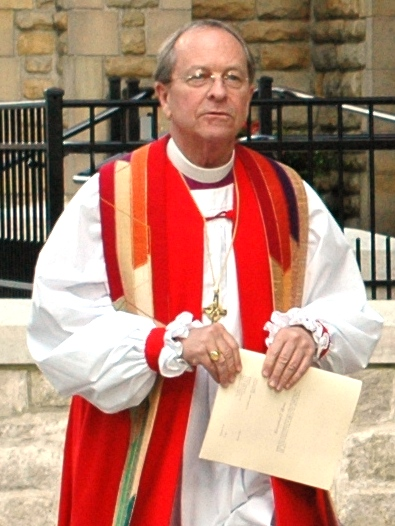
Bishop Robinson in 2006, during the 75th General Convention of The Episcopal Church

In the American Episcopal Church, a resolution was adopted in 2009 by the General Convention, the church's governing body, declaring that gays, lesbians, and bisexuals who had been baptized were eligible for "any ordained ministry", including becoming bishops. In the wider Anglican Communion, which includes more conservative congregations in developing countries, the ordination of gays, lesbians, and bisexuals is highly controversial. Ellen Barrett was the first openly homosexual person ordained by the Episcopal Church in 1977. Philip Lance was the first open male homosexual ordained by the Episcopal Church in 1988.

The Archbishop of Canterbury, spiritual head of the Anglican Communion, formed the Eames Commission due to controversy associated with the consecration of Gene Robinson to the order of bishop in the Episcopal Diocese of New Hampshire and the planned consecration of Jeffrey John (who was to be ordained Bishop of Reading) in the Church of England. Its findings, published as the Windsor Report, recommended that the consecration of people in same-sex relationships as bishops cease, although it conspicuously avoided discussing gays, lesbians, and bisexuals ordained as priests and deacons. In response, the Episcopal Church placed a moratorium on confirming the consecrations of all bishops.

Bishop J. Neil Alexander of the Episcopal Diocese of Atlanta said that he voted for the ordination of Gene Robinson as a bishop because Robinson was open about his sexuality and honest about his caring relationship.

In the United Kingdom, the Church of England has permitted transgender priests to serve since 2000. The Church of England has also allowed gay and lesbian priests in civil partnerships since 2005. In 2013, the church allowed bishops to enter into same-sex civil partnerships. In 2016, Bishop Nicholas Chamberlain, the Bishop of Grantham, was the first to announce that he is in a same-sex partnership. The Church in Wales has allowed priests to enter into civil partnerships since 2005. The Scottish Episcopal Church has ordained LGBT priests since before 2002. The Church of Ireland has no formal policy on civil partnerships and the first priest entered into a same-sex civil partnership in 2011.

The Anglican Episcopal Church of Brazil supports the ordination of LGBT clergy. In New Zealand, the Anglican Church in Aotearoa, New Zealand and Polynesia ordained an openly gay deacon in 2006. The Anglican Church of Australia has no official position on homosexuality. In 2012, the Diocese of Gippsland in Australia appointed an openly partnered gay priest.

In South Africa, the Anglican Church of Southern Africa is among the denominations in which gay priests can be "legally ordained." Before 2003, the Rev. Rowan Smith came out as gay and was supported by his congregation. The South African church also consecrated an openly gay bishop, Bishop Mervyn Castle.

A bishop in the Church of South India, also a part of the Anglican Communion, stated that he would ordain a transgender priest.

In 2000, transgender Church of England priest Rev Carol Stone underwent gender transition and was allowed to continue her ministry as a female priest. She was supported by her bishop, The Right Reverend Barry Rogerson, who stated 'There are no ethical or ecclesiastical legal reasons why the Rev Carol Stone should not continue in ministry in the Church of England.' This made her the first transgender Church of England priest. In 2005 Sarah Jones became the first openly transgender person ordained by the Church of England as a priest.

In July 2009, clergy and laity in the United States voted to reject the three-year moratorium on the consecration of gay clergy as bishops. The Archbishop of Canterbury responded to this in a statement which regretted that this move would not heal the divisions in the church, and effectively sets in motion a two-tier system of Anglicanism in which those within the covenant can speak as Anglicans, and LGBT clergy and those who support them fall outside the covenant, and so cannot speak on behalf of other Anglicans. A coalition of thirteen LGBT Christian groups in the UK formulated a united response to the Archbishop's statement, questioning whether the 'listening process' he had called for had been properly engaged with, that LGBT people are committed members of the communion, and criticising a 'two-track' system within Anglicanism.

In August 2009, it was announced that two gay Episcopal priests were among the six nominated candidates for the role of suffragan bishop of Los Angeles; both were in committed relationships. The appointment was voted on in December 2009 and, in March 2010, it was announced that Mary Douglas Glasspool had been elected; becoming only the second openly gay bishop in the Episcopal Church. In December 2009, the Episcopal Diocese of Minnesota also announced a lesbian had been nominated as a bishop, but did not make election.

Formed in opposition to the Episcopal Church's policies concerning gays, lesbians, and bisexuals are several other Anglican church bodies. The Anglican Mission in the Americas was founded in 2000 by the Anglican Communion's Rwandan and Southeast Asia provinces to serve North American Anglicans formerly affiliated with the Episcopal Church and the Anglican Church of Canada; it claims more than 100 parishes in the United States. A church-planting partner with the Anglican Mission is the Anglican Church in North America, founded in 2010. It claims over 600 parishes serving 100,000 members, most of whom are former members of the Episcopal Church opposed to the ordination of LGBT clergy. The Anglican Church in North America includes four dioceses which withdrew from the Episcopal Church and subsequently joined with the 13,000 member Reformed Episcopal Church and several smaller bodies.

In addition, the even more conservative Continuing Anglican movement is composed of various churches which were formed in the late twentieth century by former Episcopalians opposed to what they believed were liberal and unscriptural developments within the parent body. Although the place of homosexual persons in the life of the church was not one of the causes of these churches' separation from the Anglican Communion, all of them are strongly opposed to both the ordination of gay clergy and to church-approved matrimonial rites for LGBT persons.

An interfaith movement known as the Confessing Movement has also been a vehicle for opposition to the ordination of non-celibate gays, lesbians, and bisexuals.

In 2011, the Church in Wales began giving pensions for the same-sex partners of gay clergy. The Church of England's General Synod approved the change in 2010.

In 2013, the Church of England allowed gay clergy who live in civil partnerships to become bishops as long as they remain celibate. However, clergy who married the same gender despite the Church's official opposition to same-sex marriage (such as Andrew Foreshew-Cain and Jeremy Pemberton) found themselves blacklisted from employment. In 2014, Richard Inwood refused Pemberton permission to officiate (PTO) in the diocese of Southwell and Nottingham due to his marriage, and thus he was refused a job as an NHS chaplain in the diocese. The Court of Appeal upheld this refusal in 2018.

In September 2016, the Anglican Church of Canada elected as suffragan bishop open gay Kevin Robertson in diocese Toronto.

Today, as aforementioned, LGBT priests may be ordained by bishops within the Anglican Church in Aotearoa, New Zealand, and Polynesia, Anglican Church of Australia, Anglican Church of Canada, Anglican Church of Southern Africa, Anglican Episcopal Church of Brazil, Church in Wales, Church of England, Church of Ireland, Church of South India, The Episcopal Church, and the Scottish Episcopal Church.

== Roman Catholicism ==
According to the Catholic Church's moral doctrine, homosexual attraction is disordered, and homosexual acts themselves are sinful. However, the Church does allow the ordination of men who may have, in the past, experienced some manifestation of homosexual tendencies (not homosexuality itself) during teenage years as a "transitory problem" if they have fully overcome this, and only on the condition that they have lived without experiencing these for 3 or more years, and that no longer have deep-seated homosexual tendencies. Priests in the Latin Church are required to live by the Church's teachings, and most make a vow or promise of celibacy. In 2025, Pope Francis and the Vatican approved a document allowing celibate gay men to be considered for the priesthood, being held to the same standards of chastity and celibacy as heterosexual priests. The Conference of Italian Bishops subsequently stated that "the norms on the non-admission of homosexuals to the priesthood will not change."

A 2006 survey suggests that Catholic church-goers in the United States were close to evenly split on whether homosexual men should or should not serve as priests or bishops.

A 2000 document from the Congregation for the Doctrine of the Faith concludes that sex-change procedures do not change a person's sex. "The key point, is that the transsexual surgical operation is so superficial and external that it does not change the personality. If the person was a male, he remains male. If she was female, she remains female." However, those who have undergone such a procedure are prevented from ordination or admission to consecrated religious life.

== Latter-day Saints ==
The Church of Jesus Christ of Latter-day Saints ordains to the priesthood only men who have covenanted not to have sex with anyone besides their wife. Some gay men have chosen to remain celibate, while others have chosen to marry. Only heterosexual married men may become bishops. Transgender persons who were assigned male at birth may only receive the priesthood if they have not had, and are not planning to have, sex reassignment surgery (1999 Church handbook). Those assigned female at birth are not ordained to the priesthood.

== Philippine Independent Church ==
On February 24, 2023, the Philippine Independent Church, officially called the Iglesia Filipina Independiente and colloquially the Aglipayan Church, an Independent Catholic denomination with Anglo-Catholic orientation based in the Philippines, ordained Wylard "Wowa" Ledama, a trans woman, to the diaconate as the church's first trans clergy in the predominantly conservative country.

== See also ==
- Christianity and sexual orientation
- LGBTQ bishops
- Homosexuality and Anglicanism
- Christian views on homosexuality
- Homosexuality and Roman Catholic priests
- List of Christian denominational positions on homosexuality
- Ordination of women
- Transgender people and religion
