= Christina Beardsley =

English Anglican priest (born 1951)

Reverend Doctor Christina Beardsley
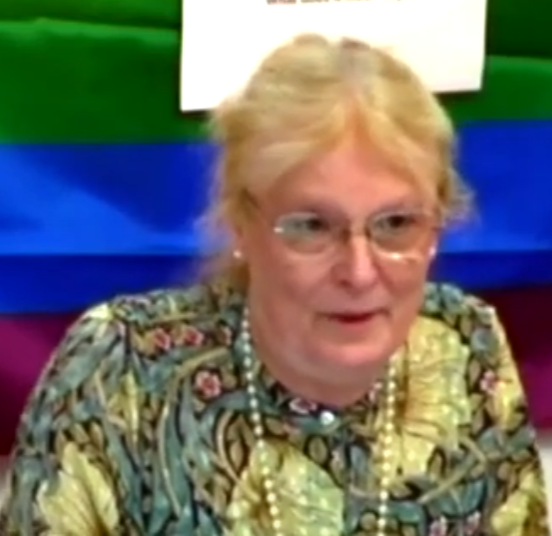
- Giving the Brenda Harrison Memorial Lecture in 2018

Personal life
- Born: 1951 (age 74–75) Huddersfield, West Riding of Yorkshire, England
- Education: University of Sussex; St John's College, Cambridge; Westcott House, Cambridge; University of Leeds
- Occupation: retired Anglican ordained priest and healthcare chaplain, theologian, researcher, writer, and advocate for transgender inclusion in the Church of England

Religious life
- Religion: Church of England
- Ordination: 1979

Christina Beardsley (born 1951), also known as Tina, is an English retired Anglican priest and healthcare chaplain, theologian, researcher, writer, and advocate for transgender inclusion in the Church of England.

== Biography ==
Beardsley was born in 1951 in Huddersfield, West Riding of Yorkshire. She was educated at the University of Sussex, St. John’s College and the Anglican theological college Westcott House (both at the University of Cambridge) and at the University of Leeds. She was ordained in 1979. Beardsley worked as a parish priest in the Portsmouth diocese before moving to London.

Beardsley is a transgender woman who began exploring her gender transition in 1999. In 2000, she established the Clare Project, a transgender support group, in Brighton and Hove.

From 2008 to 2016, Beardsley was Head of the Multi-faith Chaplaincy at the Chelsea and Westminster NHS Foundation Trust Hospital in London. Between 2006 and 2013 she was Changing Attitude England’s first transgender trustee. She was also an advocate in the campaign for women to become bishops in the Church on England, and was vocal in her opposition to the General Synod’s 2012 vote denying this, as well as the church's exemption from equality legislation.

From August 2017, Beardsley was one of the five original consultants in the House of Bishops' (the religious governing assembly of the Church of England)'s "Living in Love and Faith" (LLF) project on human identity, sexuality, and marriage. She resigned in 2019 over "remarks made about an LGBTI+ contact." She has continued to campaign for the inclusion of transgender and non-binary people in similar projects and to influence the Church of England's policy and practice in relation to transgender and non-binary people. She has also submitted written evidence to parliamentary committees and protested with Peter Tatchell and Davis Mac-Iyalla over the "victimising, intimidating and bullying" of the gay Anglican priest Canon Jeremy Pemberton in 2014.

Beardsley has published several articles and books, has participated in queer theology panel discussions and has spoken at the Cambridge Festival of Ideas. She has been interviewed on how her personal experience of being Christian and transgender intersect for the Gender Identity Research and Education Society (GIRES), on Soho Radio, and on the Evolving Faith podcast. She has also been interviewed for the 40th birthday of the OneBodyOneFaith (previously the Lesbian and Gay Christian Movement) in 2016, with the project archive held at the London School of Economics Library.

As of 2025, Beardsley is retired and assists in London parishes.

== Publications ==
=== Articles ===
- Taking Issue The Transsexual Hiatus in Some Issues in Human Sexuality, Theology, Vol. 108, Issue 845. (2005)
- The Transsexual Person Is My Neighbour: Pastoral Guidelines for Christian Clergy, Pastors and Congregations (with an Appendix on Intersex by Michelle O'Brien) (2007)
- Love is a Many Gendered Thing: Gender Roles, Relationships and Trans People, Modern Believing, Vol. 55, Issue 2. (2014)

=== Book review ===
- Theological Reflection and Education for Ministry, Scottish Journal of Healthcare Chaplaincy, Vol 10, Issue 1. (2007)

=== Books ===
- Unutterable Love: The Passionate Life and Preaching of F. W. Robertson (2009)
- This is My Body: hearing the theology of transgender Christians, co-written with Michelle O’Brien (2016)
- Transfaith: a Transgender Pastoral Resource, Includes Bible Studies and Liturgies, co-written with Chris Dowd and Justin Edward Tanis (2018)
- Trans Affirming Churches: How to Celebrate Gender-Variant People and Their Loved Ones, co-written with Chris Dowd with foreword by Susannah Cornwall (2020)
- Theology and Human Flourishing, Essays in Honour of Elizabeth Baxter, contributor (2024)
