= Demographics of Michigan =

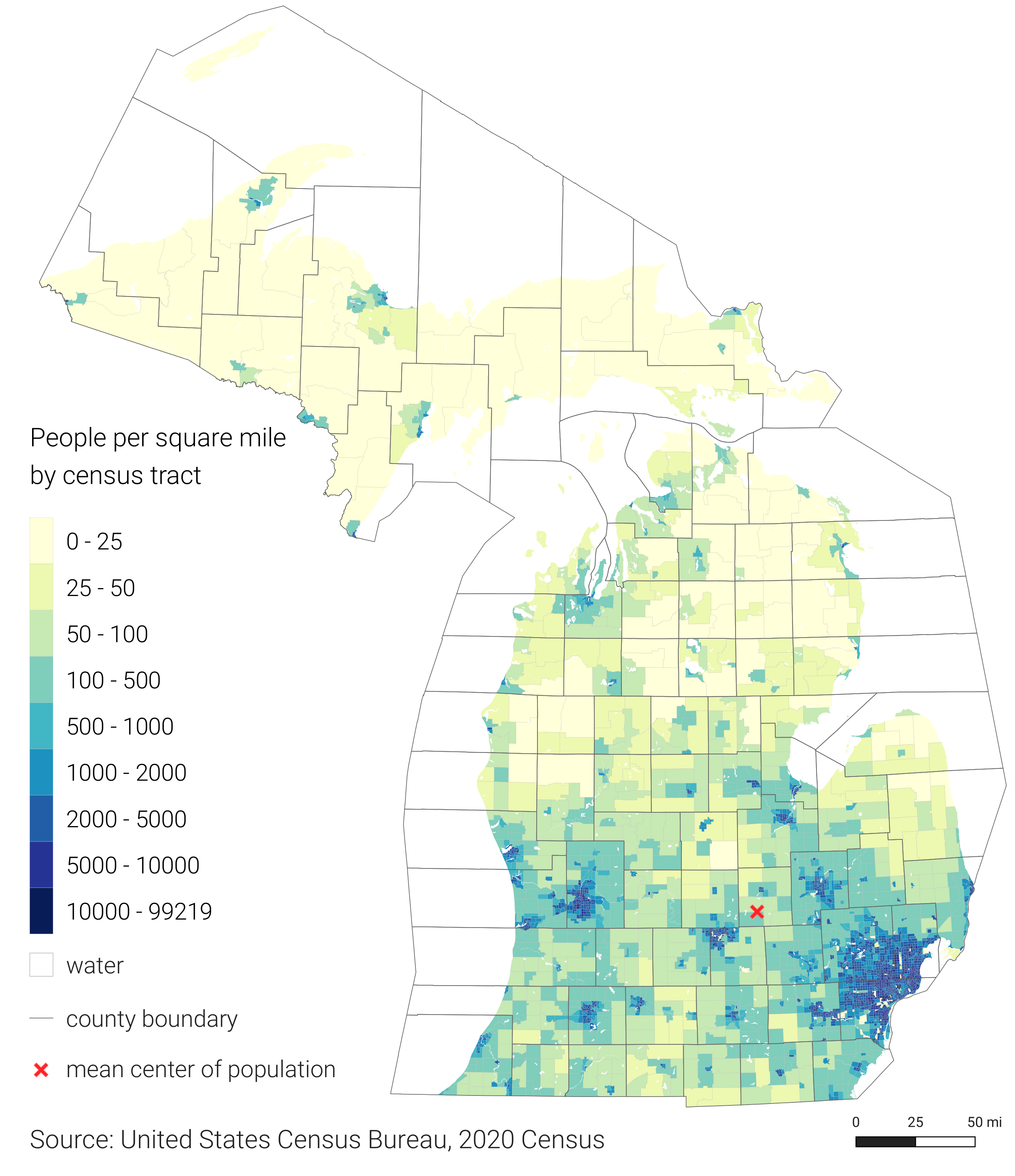
Michigan 2020 population distribution

Michigan is the third-most populous state in the Midwestern United States, with a population of 10,077,331 according to the 2020 United States census. The vast majority of the state's population lives in the Lower Peninsula, with only 301,609 residing in the Upper Peninsula. Culturally, the Lower Peninsula is more diverse with European, Native American, and African-descended communities prevalent, whereas the Upper Peninsula is predominantly European or Native American.

== Race and ethnicity ==
Historical population
Census	Pop.	Note	%±
1800	3,757		—
1810	4,762		26.8%
1820	7,452		56.5%
1830	28,004		275.8%
1840	212,267		658.0%
1850	397,654		87.3%
1860	749,113		88.4%
1870	1,184,059		58.1%
1880	1,636,937		38.2%
1890	2,093,890		27.9%
1900	2,420,982		15.6%
1910	2,810,173		16.1%
1920	3,668,412		30.5%
1930	4,842,325		32.0%
1940	5,256,106		8.5%
1950	6,371,766		21.2%
1960	7,823,194		22.8%
1970	8,875,083		13.4%
1980	9,262,078		4.4%
1990	9,295,297		0.4%
2000	9,938,444		6.9%
2010	9,883,640		−0.6%
2020	10,077,331		2.0%
2022 (est.)	10,034,113		−0.4%
Sources: 1910–2020; 2022

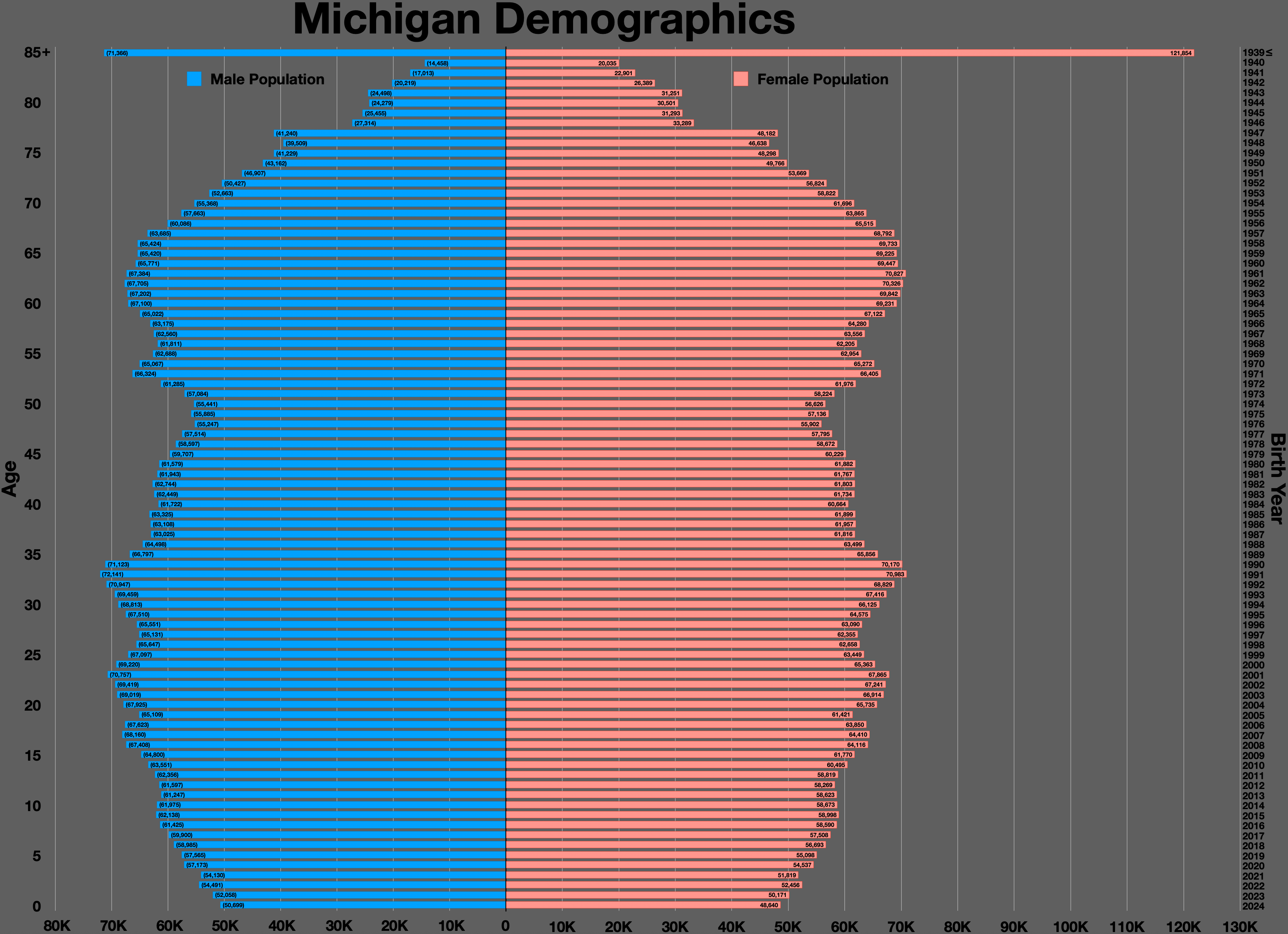
Michigan population pyramid

Michigan racial breakdown of population
Self-identified race	1970	1990	2000	2010	2020
White American	88.3%	83.4%	80.1%	78.9%	73.9%
Black or African American	11.2%	13.9%	14.2%	14.2%	13.7%
Asian American	0.2%	1.1%	1.8%	2.4%	3.3%
American Indian	0.2%	0.6%	0.6%	0.6%	0.6%
Native Hawaiian and other Pacific Islander	—	—	—	—	—
Other race	0.2%	0.9%	1.3%	1.5%	2.2%
Two or more races	—	—	1.9%	2.3%	6.3%

Since the end of 20th century, Michigan has gradually diversified from being 80.1% white at the 2000 U.S. census, to constituting 73.9% of the population in 2020.

=== White and European Americans ===
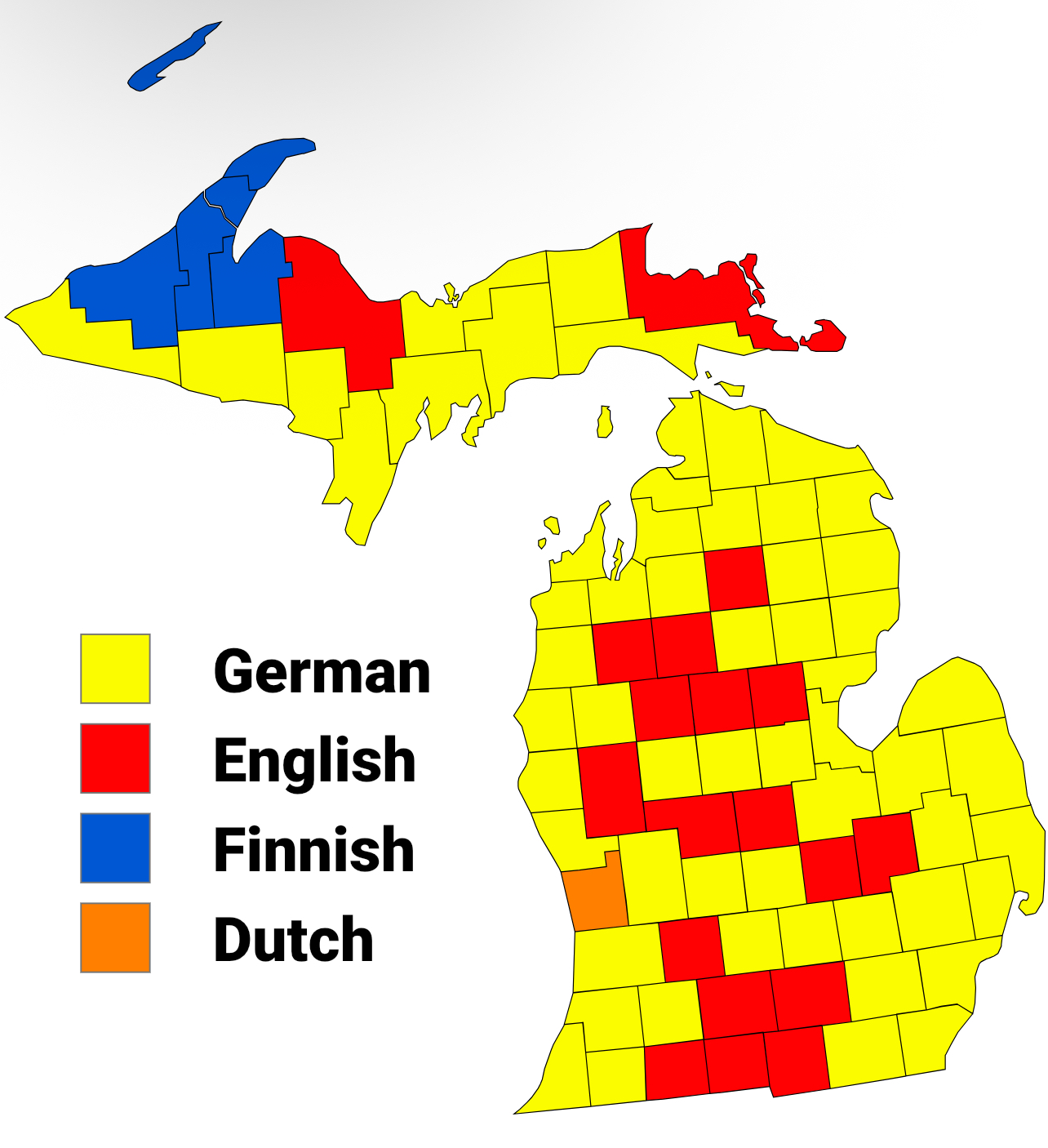
Largest White alone or in any combination ethnic origin in Michigan by county, per the 2020 census

Since colonial European and American settlement, the majority of Michigan's population has been predominantly non-Hispanic or non-Latino white; Americans of European descent live throughout every county in the state, and most of Metro Detroit. Large European American groups include those of German, British, Irish, Polish and Belgian ancestry. Scandinavian and Finnish Americans have a notable presence in the Upper Peninsula. Western Michigan is known for its Dutch heritage, especially in Holland and metropolitan Grand Rapids.

=== Black and African Americans ===
Black and African Americans—coming to Detroit and other northern cities in the Great Migration of the early 20th century—have formed a majority of the population in Detroit and other cities including Flint and Benton Harbor. Since the 2021 census estimates—while Detroit was still the largest city in Michigan with a majority black population—it was no longer the largest black-majority city in the U.S., being surpassed by Memphis, Tennessee.

In the 2020 Census, 1,376,579 Michigan residents were identified as African American (of the total 10,077,331). African Americans make up more than 20% of the population in just one county: Wayne (37.6%). African Americans in the seven counties of Wayne (674,782), Oakland (170,753), Macomb (109,476), Genesee (79,914), Kent (64,499), Washtenaw (42,819), and Ingham (35,580) make up more than 85% of all African Americans in the state.

=== MENA Americans ===
As of 2007, about 300,000 people in Southeastern Michigan trace their descent from the Middle East and Asia. Dearborn has a sizeable Arab American community, with many Assyrians, and Lebanese who immigrated for jobs in the auto industry in the 1920s, along with more recent Yemenis and Iraqis.

=== Asian Americans ===
As of 2007, almost 8,000 Hmong people lived in the state of Michigan, about double their 1999 presence in the state. Most lived in northeastern Detroit, but they had been increasingly moving to Pontiac and Warren. By 2015, the number of Hmong in the Detroit city limits had significantly declined. Lansing hosts a statewide Hmong New Year Festival. The Hmong community also had a prominent portrayal in the 2008 film Gran Torino, which was set in Detroit.

As of 2015, 80% of Michigan's Japanese population lived in the counties of Macomb, Oakland, Washtenaw, and Wayne in the Detroit and Ann Arbor areas. As of April 2013, the largest Japanese national population is in Novi, with 2,666 Japanese residents, and the next largest populations are respectively in Ann Arbor, West Bloomfield Township, Farmington Hills, and Battle Creek. The state has 481 Japanese employment facilities providing 35,554 local jobs. 391 of them are in Southeast Michigan, providing 20,816 jobs, and the 90 in other regions in the state provide 14,738 jobs. The Japanese Direct Investment Survey of the Consulate-General of Japan, Detroit stated more than 2,208 additional Japanese residents were employed in the State of Michigan as of 1 October 2012, than in 2011. During the 1990s, the Japanese population of Michigan experienced an increase, and many Japanese people with children moved to particular areas for their proximity to Japanese grocery stores and high-performing schools.

=== Ancestries ===
Ancestry	Number	%
Afghan	1,037	
Albanian	27,952	

== Vital statistics ==
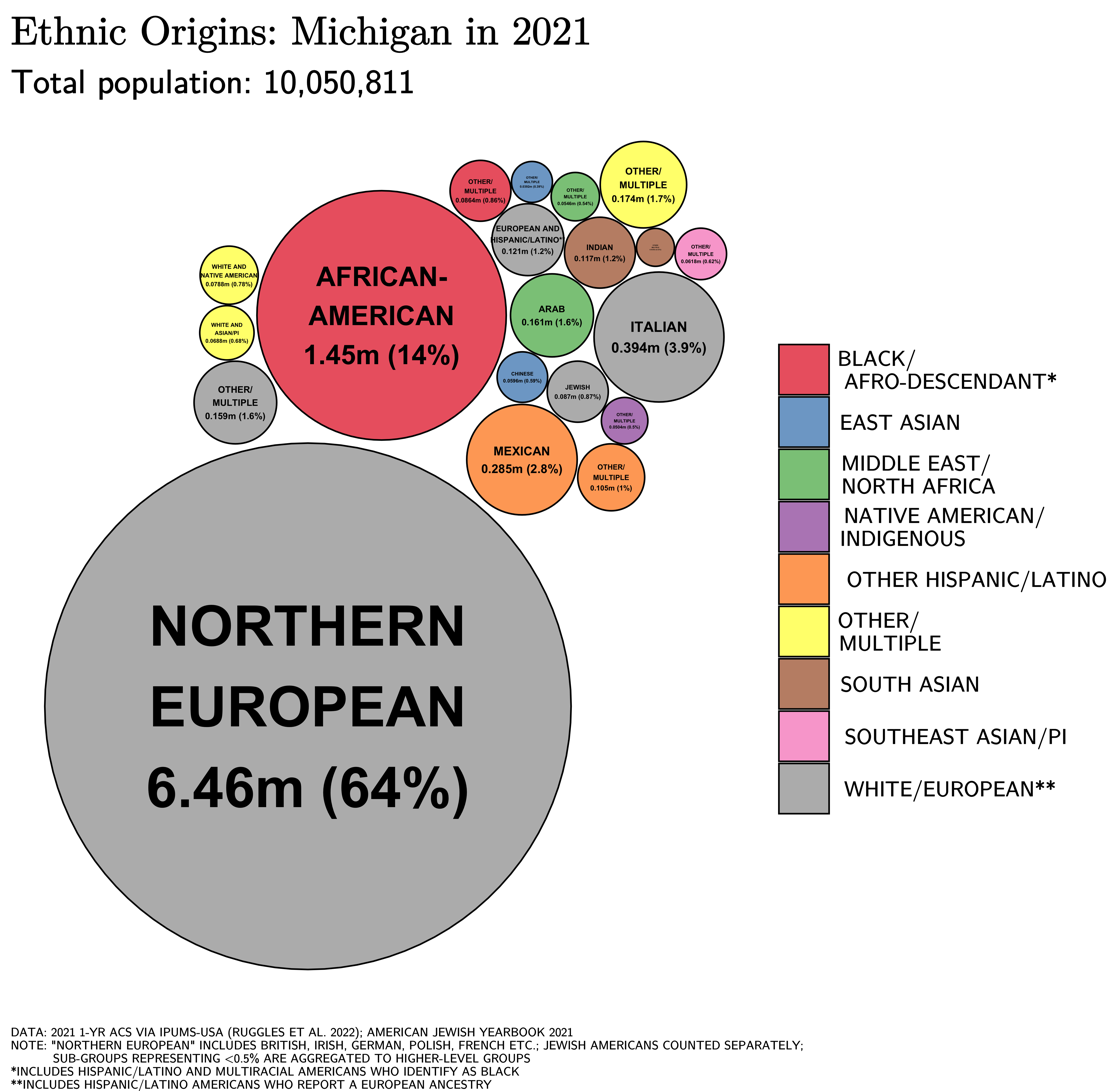
Ethnic origins in Michigan (2021 ACS)

As of 2011, 34.3% of Michigan's children under the age of one belonged to racial or ethnic minority groups, meaning they had at least one parent who was not non-Hispanic white.

Note: Percentages in the table can exceed 100% as Hispanics are counted both by their ethnicity and by their race.

Live births by single race/ethnicity of mother
Race of mother	2014	2015	2016	2017	2018	2019	2020	2021	2022	2023	2024
White	80,304 (70.2%)	78,960 (69.7%)	77,696 (68.6%)	75,578 (67.8%)	74,777 (68.0%)	73,025 (67.7%)	70,426 (67.7%)	72,108 (68.7%)	70,340 (68.7%)	67,719 (68.3%)	67,836 (68.2%)
Black	22,237 (19.4%)	22,394 (19.8%)	20,565 (18.1%)	20,849 (18.7%)	20,558 (18.7%)	20,370 (18.9%)	19,341 (18.6%)	18,288 (17.4%)	17,235 (16.8%)	16,320 (16.5%)	15,472 (15.5%)
Asian	4,284 (3.7%)	4,294 (3.8%)	4,316 (3.8%)	4,468 (4.0%)	4,395 (4.0%)	4,304 (4.0%)	4,260 (4.1%)	4,050 (3.8%)	3,989 (3.9%)	4,072 (4.1%)	4,372 (4.4%)
American Indian	784 (0.7%)	786 (0.7%)	418 (0.4%)	426 (0.4%)	446 (0.4%)	433 (0.4%)	410 (0.4%)	429 (0.4%)	394 (0.4%)	316 (0.3%)	321 (0.3%)
Hispanic (any race)	7,352 (6.4%)	7,431 (6.5%)	7,485 (6.6%)	7,339 (6.6%)	7,139 (6.5%)	7,117 (6.6%)	6,985 (6.7%)	7,075 (6.7%)	7,127 (7.0%)	7,555 (7.6%)	8,281 (8.3%)
Total	114,375 (100%)	113,312 (100%)	113,315 (100%)	111,426 (100%)	110,032 (100%)	107,886 (100%)	104,074 (100%)	104,980 (100%)	102,321 (100%)	99,124 (100%)	99,525 (100%)

- Since 2016, data for births of White Hispanic origin are not collected, but included in one Hispanic group; persons of Hispanic origin may be of any race.

== Immigration ==
According to the American Immigration Council in 2019, an estimated 6.8% of Michiganders were immigrants, while 3.8% were native-born U.S. citizens with at least one immigrant parent. Numbering approximately 678,255 according to the 2019 survey, the majority of Michigander immigrants came from Mexico (11.5%), India (11.3%), Iraq (7.5%), China (5.3%), and Canada (5.3%); the primary occupations of its immigrants were technology, agriculture, and healthcare. Among its immigrant cohort, there were 108,105 undocumented immigrants, making up 15.9% of the total immigrant population.

== Languages ==
Most common non-English languages spoken in Michigan
Language	Percentage of population (as of 2010)
Spanish	2.93%
Arabic	1.04%
German	0.44%
Chinese	0.36%
French	0.31%
Polish	0.29%
Syriac languages	0.25%
Italian	0.21%
Albanian	0.19%
Hindi	0.16%
Tagalog	0.16%
Vietnamese	0.16%
Japanese	0.16%
Korean	0.16%

In 2010, 91.11% (8,507,947) of Michigan residents age five and older spoke only English at home, while 2.93% (273,981) spoke Spanish, 1.04% (97,559) Arabic, 0.44% (41,189) German, 0.36% (33,648) Chinese (which includes Mandarin), 0.31% (28,891) French, 0.29% (27,019) Polish, and Syriac languages (such as Modern Aramaic and Northeastern Neo-Aramaic) was spoken as a main language by 0.25% (23,420) of the population over the age of five. In total, 8.89% (830,281) of Michigan's population age five and older spoke a mother language other than English.

== Religion ==
Religious self-identification, per Public Religion Research Institute's 2021 American Values Survey
1. Protestantism (43.0%)
2. Catholicism (24.0%)
3. Jehovah's Witness (1.00%)
4. Unaffiliated (28.0%)
5. Judaism (1.00%)
6. Islam (1.00%)
7. Other (2.00%)

Historically, several Native American religions have been practiced in the present-day state of Michigan. Following British and French colonization of the region surrounding Michigan, Christianity became the dominant religion, with Roman Catholicism historically being the largest single Christian group for the state. Until the 19th century, the Roman Catholic Church was the only organized religious group in Michigan, reflecting the territory's French colonial roots. Detroit's St. Anne's parish, established in 1701 by Antoine de la Mothe Cadillac, is the second-oldest Roman Catholic parish in the United States. On March 8, 1833, the Holy See formally established a diocese in the Michigan territory, which included all of Michigan, Wisconsin, Minnesota, and the Dakotas east of the Mississippi River. When Michigan became a state in 1837, the boundary of the Roman Catholic Diocese of Detroit was redrawn to coincide with that of the state; the other dioceses were later carved out from the Detroit Diocese but remain part of the Ecclesiastical Province of Detroit.

According to the Association of Religion Data Archives in 2020, there were 1,492,732 adherents of Roman Catholicism. Additionally, there's also a significant Independent Catholic presence centered in Metro Detroit. As of 2016, the most notable Independent Catholic jurisdiction is the Ecumenical Catholic Church of Christ established by Archbishop Karl Rodig; the see of this church operates in a former Roman Catholic parish church.

With the introduction of Protestantism to the state, it began to form the largest collective Christian group. In 2010, the Association of Religion Data Archives reported the largest Protestant denomination was the United Methodist Church with 228,521 adherents; followed by the Lutheran Church–Missouri Synod with 219,618, and the Evangelical Lutheran Church in America with 120,598 adherents. The Christian Reformed Church in North America had almost 100,000 members and more than 230 congregations in Michigan. The Reformed Church in America had 76,000 members and 154 congregations in the state. By the 2020 study, non- and inter-denominational Protestant churches formed the largest Protestant group in Michigan, numbering 508,904. The Lutheran Church–Missouri Synod grew to become the second-largest single Christian denomination, and United Methodists declined to being the third-largest. The Lutheran Protestant tradition was introduced by German and Scandinavian immigrants. Altogether, Baptists numbered 321,581 between the National Missionary Baptists, National Baptists, American Baptists, Southern Baptists, National Baptists of America, Progressive National Baptists, and Full Gospel Baptists; black Baptists formed the largest constituency. In West Michigan, Dutch immigrants fled from the specter of religious persecution and famine in the Netherlands around 1850 and settled in and around what is now Holland, Michigan, establishing a "colony" on American soil that fervently held onto Calvinist doctrine that established a significant presence of Reformed churches.

In the same 2010 survey, Jewish adherents in the state of Michigan were estimated at 44,382, and Muslims at 120,351. The first Jewish synagogue in the state was Temple Beth El, founded by twelve German Jewish families in Detroit in 1850. Islam was introduced by immigrants from the Near East during the 20th century. Michigan is home to the largest mosque in North America, the Islamic Center of America in Dearborn. Battle Creek, Michigan, is also the birthplace of the Seventh-day Adventist Church, which was founded on May 21, 1863.

== Homelessness ==
In 2014, Michigan had 97,642 homeless individuals on its streets. In the VI-SPADT (Vulnerability Index and Service Prioritization Decision Assistance tool) initiated by the Michigan Department of Health and Human Services (MDHHS) alongside the Michigan State Housing Development Authority (MSHDA) it was found that 2,462 individuals had 4,564 interactions with the police between June 2014 and April 2015. The 2014 VI-SPADT found that minority populations were overrepresented. 52% of the homeless population were a part of a minority group, as well as people with disabilities of long duration such as chronic health conditions, mental health/cognitive conditions and substance abuse (65%).

The criminalization of panhandling in Michigan has been the subject to much debate in public opinion and in the courts:

In 2011 and 2013, Grand Rapids was the center for this debate. In 2011, the American Civil Liberties Union of Michigan (ACLU) filed a federal lawsuit challenging a law that makes begging a crime as a violation of free speech. Prior to this, the ACLU discovered that police officers had been arresting, prosecuting and jailing individual people for requesting financial assistance on the streets. Between 2008 and 2011, there were approximately 400 arrests made by Grand Rapids under an old law that criminalizes the act of begging – 211 of these cases resulted in jail time.

The ACLU focused on the cases of two men. James Speet was arrested for holding a sign reading "Need a Job. God Bless" and Ernest Sims, a veteran, was arrested for asking for spare change for a bus fare. The debate was seated in the fact that other individuals and organizations were allowed to raise funds on the streets without being charged for a crime, yet these man were jailed for the same principle.

The results of these cases were positive for the ACLU side – Judge Robert Jonker ruled in 2012 that the law is unconstitutional and in 2013 the U.S. Court of Appeals ruled that begging is protected speech under the First Amendment. On the opposition side of this case and wider debate was the State Attorney General Bill Schuette who appealed the ruling that the state law violated the First Amendment. Schuette contended that the city and the state safety is at risk and there were concerns around pedestrian and vehicle traffic, protection of businesses and tourism, as well as fraud.

The state argued that it had an interest in preventing Fraud – Schuette contended that not all who beg are legitimately homeless or use the funds they raise to meet basic needs, the money goes to alcohol and other substances. The court agreed with Schuette that preventing fraud and duress are in the interest of the state, but directly prohibiting begging does not align with the prevention of fraud as they are not necessarily intertwined.

This debate resurfaced again in 2016 with the two sides again being prevention of unwanted behaviours and preservation of constitutional rights. In Battle Creek, officials passed a pair of proposals that are aimed at limiting panhandling and loitering throughout the city. City commissioners were split in the vote along with the general public. Under the new ordinances the following situations could lead to legal apprehension by the police – remaining idly within 25 feet of an intersection without a license; soliciting money from anyone near building entrances, restrooms, ATMS or in line; panhandling between sunset and sunrise on public property without an official license or permit; approaching another person in a way that would cause a reasonable person to feel terrorized, intimidated or harassed; forcing oneself upon another i.e. continuing to ask for money after being turned down. Any violations can be considered civil infractions and can result in fines. The bill, aimed at targeting 'aggressive' panhandling was passed in September 2016.

There are a range of implications that come along with the criminalization of begging behaviours. Jessica Vail is the program manager of the Grand Rapids Area Collation to End Homelessness and contends that it is more cost efficient for people to not be homeless and it also keeps our criminal justice system from getting overloaded. Don Mitchell conducted research in 1998 on the criminalization of behaviours associated with homelessness and begging and highlighted the negative effect this has on the cycle of homelessness and crime.

Criminalizing behaviours that are necessary for the survival of homeless people such as begging, sleeping and sitting in public, loitering in parks and on streets and urinating and defecating in public leads them to be subjects of the criminal justice system. ACLU legislative liaison Shelli Weisberg consolidates this notion of a cyclical disadvantage in 2016 – fining people who cannot afford to pay a fine for something they cannot avoid doing and then putting them in a system where they cannot afford to defend themselves or challenge these offences questions how just the criminalization of such acts is.

== Vital statistics ==
Year	Population	Live births	Deaths	Natural change	Crude birth rate (per 1,000)	Crude death rate (per 1,000)	Natural change (per 1,000)	Crude migration change (per 1,000)
2000	9,952,450	136,171	86,953	49,218	13.7	8.7	5.0	
2001	9,991,120	133,427	86,424	47,003	13.4	8.7	4.7	-0.8
2002	10,015,710	129,967	87,795	42,172	13.0	8.8	4.2	-1.8
2003	10,041,152	131,094	86,728	44,366	13.1	8.6	4.5	-1.9
2004	10,055,315	129,776	85,169	44,607	12.9	8.5	4.4	-3.0
2005	10,051,137	127,706	86,867	40,839	12.7	8.6	4.1	-4.5
2006	10,036,081	127,483	86,042	41,441	12.7	8.6	4.1	-5.6
2007	10,001,284	125,261	86,721	38,540	12.5	8.7	3.8	-7.3
2008	9,946,889	121,127	88,445	32,682	12.2	8.9	3.3	-8.8
2009	9,901,591	117,294	86,455	30,839	11.8	8.7	3.1	-7.7
2010	9,880,111	114,531	88,021	26,510	11.6	8.9	2.7	-4.9
2011	9,895,652	114,008	89,508	24,500	11.5	9.0	2.5	-0.9
2012	9,921,001	113,091	89,901	23,190	11.4	9.1	2.3	0.2
2013	9,947,598	113,489	92,408	21,081	11.4	9.3	2.1	0.6
2014	9,974,914	114,375	93,914	20,461	11.5	9.4	2.1	0.7
2015	9,987,448	113,312	95,140	18,172	11.3	9.5	1.8	-0.6
2016	10,017,194	113,315	96,231	17,084	11.3	9.6	1.7	1.3
2017	10,049,914	111,426	97,602	13,824	11.1	9.7	1.4	1.9
2018	10,070,532	110,032	98,903	11,129	10.9	9.8	1.1	0.9
2019	10,078,126	107,886	99,084	8,802	10.7	9.8	0.9	-0.1
2020	10,072,294	104,074	117,106	-13,032	10.3	11.6	-1.3	0.7
2021	10,042,362	104,980	117,782	-12,802	10.5	11.7	-1.2	-1.7
2022	10,043,906	102,321	110,499	-8,178	10.2	11.0	-0.8	1.0
2023	10,062,124	99,124	103,302	-4,178	9.9	10.3	-0.4	2.2
2024	10,099,962	99,525	102,819	-3,294	9.9	10.2	-0.3	4.1
2025	10,127,884	99,990	105,432	-5,442	9.9	10.4	-0.5	3.3
