= Ecumenical Catholic Church =

Independent Catholic church established in 1987

- Iglesia Católica Ecuménica
- Abbreviation: ECC
- Classification: Western Christian
- Orientation: Independent Catholic
- Polity: Episcopal
- Primate-Archbishop: David John Kalke
- Language: English, Spanish
- Headquarters: Guadalajara, Mexico
- Founder: Mark Steven Shirilau
- Origin: 1987; Santa Ana, California, U.S.
- Branched from: Evangelical Lutheran Church in America, Episcopal Church in the United States, and Metropolitan Community Church
- Separations: United Ecumenical Catholic Church
- Official website: ecumenicalcatholicchurch.org

The Ecumenical Catholic Church (Spanish: Iglesia Católica Ecuménica) (ECC/ICE) is an Independent Catholic church established in Santa Ana, California, United States, by Mark Steven Shirilau and Jeffrey Michael Lau, in 1987. Adhering to conventional Latin Catholic Trinitarian theology and professing the Nicene Creed, the Ecumenical Catholic Church celebrates a liturgy similar to the Pauline Mass.

== History ==
The Ecumenical Catholic Church was founded in Santa Ana, California, in 1987 by Mark Steven Shirilau—a former member of the Evangelical Lutheran Church in America and the Metropolitan Community Church—and Jeffrey Michael Lau, a former member of the Episcopal Church and the Metropolitan Community Church; the first edition of its canon law was completed and ratified on January 11, 1987.

Shirilau was ordained a priest for the Ecumenical Catholic Church in the chapel of the Claremont School of Theology on December 27, 1987, by an Independent Catholic bishop.

The first public service—at St. John Ecumenical Catholic Church—was held on September 4, 1988, at the home chapel of Mark Shirilau and Jeffery Shirilau in Santa Ana. Robert Oscar Simpson became the first person baptized in the Ecumenical Catholic Church on July 10, 1989, at his house in Los Angeles. Simpson died of AIDS a few days later.

Mark Shirilau was consecrated to the episcopacy by Bishop Donald Lawrence Jolly of the Independent Catholic Church International in San Bernardino, California, on May 19, 1991. At the service, Jeffery Shirilau—a non-ordained deacon of the Metropolitan Community Church—was ordained to the diaconate by Bishop Jolly. Bruce David LeBlanc—a community college professor and former Roman Catholic—became the first priest ordained by Bishop Shirilau. The ordination took place at an Episcopal parish church in Pocatello, Idaho, although, from 1993 to 1995, LeBlanc and other clergy resigned.

During the 1990s, the Ecumenical Catholic Church expanded into Africa, with a parish in Nairobi, Kenya, numbering an estimated 25 parishioners. By 2011, it expanded with missions and parish churches throughout Mexico, Latin America, and Italy.

Following the death of Bishop Shirilau from complications with pneumonia on January 12, 2014, while traveling in Sicily, Bishop David John Kalke of Mexico was elected as new primate archbishop for the Ecumenical Catholic Church. Some parishes rejected the new primate and moved to the similarly named Ecumenical Catholic Church of Christ under the jurisdiction of Archbishop Karl Rodig.

As of 2024, the membership of the Ecumenical Catholic Church has been governed by five bishops in Mexico, Costa Rica, the United States, and Kenya.

== Doctrine ==
Ecumenical Catholic doctrine and worship is very similar to Roman Catholic doctrine; within the Ecumenical Catholic Church, however, the LGBTQ+ community is affirmed and allowed equal marriage and ordination. While affirming and ordaining lesbian, gay, bisexual and transgender clergy, the Ecumenical Catholic Church—claiming to uphold conventional Catholicity—rejects Gnosticism, New Age, Theosophy, and Protestant worship practices found among other Independent Catholic churches.
