= Campbell MacInnes =

Anglican bishop

Angus Campbell MacInnes CMG (18 April 1901 – 29 April 1977) was an Anglican bishop in the third quarter of the twentieth century.

Angus Campbell MacInnes was born into a distinguished ecclesiastical family: his father, Rennie MacInnes, would be Bishop of Jerusalem from 1914 to 1931. He was educated at Harrow and Trinity College, Cambridge. After a curacy at St Mary Magdalene, Peckham, until 1927, he spent 23 years in the Middle East. He ended this part of his career as Archdeacon for Palestine, Syria and Trans-Jordan, succeeding Malcolm L. Maxwell in 1946, before returning to England. Between 1950 and 1953 he was then successively Vicar of St Michael's, St Albans, Rural Dean of the area and Bishop of Bedford (1953–1957) before returning to Israel to be Archbishop of Jerusalem and then Metropolitan of the Province. Campbell MacInnes was consecrated into bishop's orders on St Andrew's Day 1953 (30 November), by Geoffrey Fisher, Archbishop of Canterbury, at Canterbury Cathedral. He resigned as Archbishop effective 30 November 1968 and returned to England, where he served as Assistant Bishop of Salisbury. A Sub-Prelate of the Order of St John of Jerusalem, he died on 29 April 1977.

== Work ==
- Angus Campbell MacInnes, "The Arab refugee problem", in: Journal of the Royal Central Asian Society; vol. 36, issue 2 (April 1949), pp. 178–188.

Church of England titles
Preceded by Thomas Wood	Bishop of Bedford; 1953 – 1957	Succeeded by Basil Guy
Preceded by George Appleton	Archbishop of Jerusalem; 1957 – 1969	Succeeded by Robert Stopford
