= Bishop of Bedford =

Episcopal title

- Bishopric

anglican
- Incumbent: Richard Atkinson

Location
- Ecclesiastical province: Canterbury

Information
- First holder: John Hodgkins
- Established: 1537
- Diocese: St Albans

The Bishop of Bedford is an episcopal title used by a Church of England suffragan bishop who, under the direction of the Diocesan Bishop of St Albans, oversees 150 parishes in Luton and Bedfordshire.

The title, which takes its name after the town of Bedford, was created under the Suffragan Bishops Act 1534. The first three suffragan bishops were appointed for the Diocese of London, but through reorganisation within the Church of England in 1914, Bedford came under the Diocese of St Albans.

Richard Atkinson, formerly Archdeacon of Leicester, was consecrated by Rowan Williams, Archbishop of Canterbury, in St Paul's Cathedral on 17 May 2012.

== History ==
With the huge increase in London's population in the 19th century, the Bishop of London was one of the first to require help from other bishops. Alongside assistant bishops (including some returned from the colonies; see Assistant Bishop of London), he gradually resumed appointments to suffragan sees — Bedford was first in 1879. That see was chosen as the one erected by the Suffragan Bishops Act 1534 nearest to London; and the stipend of the bishop was provided by appointing him to St Andrew Undershaft, in the east of the City of London. The suffragan was always intended to take responsibility for the East End; by 1887 this meant the rural deaneries of Spitalfields, of Hackney and of Stepney. To these were added the rural deaneries of Islington, Shoreditch, St Sepulchre (the part outside the City), and Enfield in 1888, such that the bishop's area became known as "East and North London" — i.e. the east and north of the then-County of London (inside the diocese). Billing called himself Bishop-Suffragan for East London, and this responsibility passed to the Bishop of Stepney (which See was newly-erected under the Suffragans Nomination Act 1888) on Billing's resignation of his London duties in 1895. How was resident at Stainforth House, Upper Clapton by 1887; Billing was still residing there in 1895.

== List of the Bishops of Bedford ==
Bishops of Bedford
From	Until	Incumbent	Notes
1537	1560	John Hodgkins	Deprived by Queen Mary I; died in office.
1560	1879	in abeyance	
1879	1888	Walsham How	Suffragan for the East End; translated to Wakefield.
1888	1898	Robert Billing	Suffragan for East and North London; resigned duties in 1895, retaining the see until his death.
1898	1935	in abeyance	
1935	1939	Lumsden Barkway	Translated to St Andrews, Dunkeld & Dunblane.
1939	1942	Alymer Skelton	Previously Archdeacon of St Albans; translated to Lincoln.
1948	1953	Thomas Wood	Previously Archdeacon of St Albans.
1953	1957	Campbell MacInnes	Translated to Jerusalem.
1957	1962	Basil Guy	Translated to Gloucester.
1963	1968	John Trillo	Translated to Hertford then Chelmsford.
1968	1976	John Hare	Previously Archdeacon of Bedford; died in office.
1977	1981	Alec Graham	Translated to Newcastle.
1981	1993	David Farmbrough	Previously Archdeacon of St Albans.
1994	2002	John Richardson	Translated to honorary assistant bishop. Living
2003	2012	Richard Inwood	Previously Archdeacon of Halifax. Translated to Southwell and Nottingham
2012	present	Richard Atkinson	Previously Archdeacon of Leicester.
