= Wilfred Askwith =

British CoE clergyman (1890-1962)

Askwith in March 1952, when Bishop of Blackburn

Wilfred Marcus Askwith KCMG (24 April 1890 – 16 July 1962) was the 2nd Bishop of Blackburn who was later translated to Gloucester. Born in Hereford and educated at Hereford Cathedral School, Bedford School and Corpus Christi College, Cambridge, he was ordained in 1914. His first post was as Curate at St Helens Parish Church. After this he was a Master and Assistant Chaplain at his old school then Rector of Stalbridge. From 1925 to 1932 he was Chaplain to Europeans at Nakuru in Kenya. Returning to England he was Vicar of Sherborne then Rural Dean of Leeds before his elevation to the episcopate. He died on 16 July 1962.

Church of England titles
Preceded by Percy Herbert	Bishop of Blackburn; 1942–1954	Succeeded by Walter Baddeley
Preceded by Clifford Woodward	Bishop of Gloucester; 1954–1962	Succeeded by Basil Guy
