= John Hodgkins =

British bishop died 1560

The Right Reverend John Hodgkins
- Bishop of Bedford
- Church: Church of England
- See: Bedford
- In office: 1537–1560

Orders
- Consecration: 9 December 1537 by John Stokesley

Personal details
- Died: 1560
- Denomination: Anglican

John Hodgkins (died 1560) was an English suffragan bishop.

== Biography ==
Educated at Cambridge, Hodgkins was appointed Bishop of Bedford under the provisions of the Suffragan Bishops Act 1534 in 1537 and held the post until 1560 (although he was deprived of his roles by Queen Mary 1554–1559). From 1527 he was the Provincial of the English Dominicans and Prior of Sudbury. He was consecrated bishop on 9 December 1537 by John Stokesley of London, Robert Parfew of St Asaph and John Hilsey of Rochester, two of whom (Stokesley and Parfew) were Roman Catholic prelates recognized by the Pope.
