= Jeremy Pemberton (priest) =

Anglican priest

The Reverend Canon Jeremy Pemberton
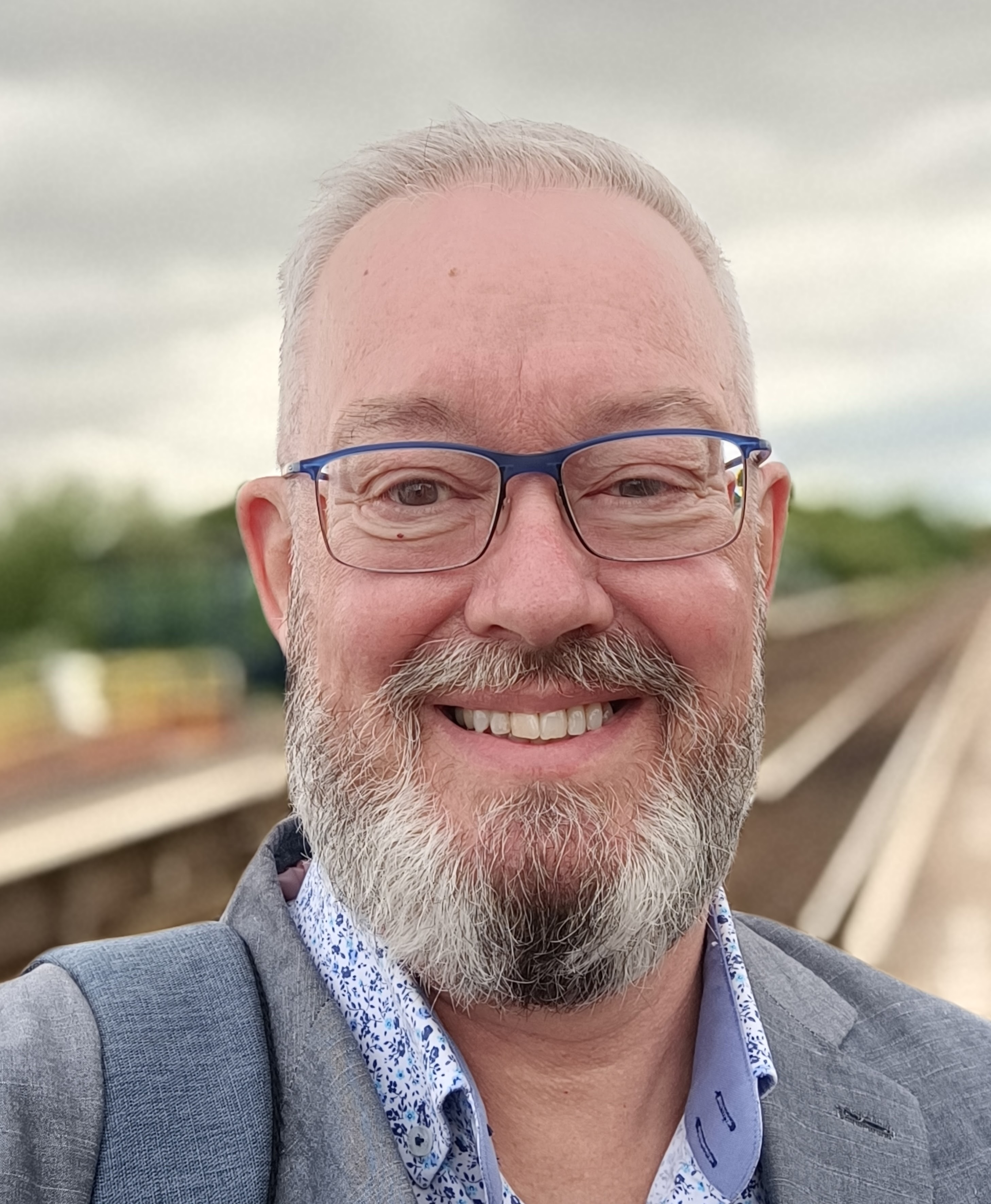
- Born: 1956 (age 69–70); Cambridge
- Education: Merton College, Oxford; Ridley Hall, Cambridge; Fitzwilliam College, Cambridge
- Known for: First male Church of England priest to marry another man
- Spouse: Laurence (m. 2014)

Ecclesiastical career
- Religion: Christianity (Anglicanism)
- Church: Church of England
- Ordained: 1981 (deacon), 1982 (priest)
- Title: The Revd Canon

Jeremy Charles Baring Pemberton (born 1956) is a British Anglican priest who was the first priest in the Church of England to enter into a same-sex marriage when he married another man in 2014. As same-sex marriages are not accepted by the church (its canon law defines marriage as between one man and one woman), he was denied a job as a chaplain for the National Health Service by John Sentamu, the Archbishop of York. Before then, he had been an Anglican priest for 33 years.

He sued the church on employment discrimination grounds. However, a tribunal upheld his dismissal, saying that being a Church of England chaplain meant that Pemberton had to uphold that church's views on marriage. The tribunal also said that the Equality Act in England and Wales allowed for religious exemptions to laws that protect people from being fired because of their sexual orientation. The dismissal was upheld on appeal by the Court of Appeal in 2018.

== Early life and ordained ministry ==
Pemberton was born in 1956. He studied at Merton College, Oxford, graduating with a Bachelor of Arts (BA) degree in 1977: as per tradition, his BA was promoted to a Master of Arts (MA Oxon) degree. From 1978 to 1981, he trained for ordination at Ridley Hall, Cambridge, an evangelical Anglican theological college. He also studied theology at Fitzwilliam College, Cambridge, graduating with a further BA in 1980.

Pemberton was ordained in the Church of England as a deacon in 1981 and as a priest in 1982, when he was 25. From 1981 to 1984, he served his curacy at All Saints' Church, Stranton in the Diocese of Durham. He then served a second curacy at St George's Church, Leeds, in the Diocese of Ripon and Leeds. From 1987 to 1991, he was a Church Mission Society mission partner.

By 2005, after teaching theology in the Democratic Republic of Congo (DRC), he became an honorary canon of Boga-Zaire in the DRC. He was also an honorary canon of Ely in Cambridgeshire while he worked as team rector of 13 parishes in West Cambridgeshire.

== Marriage ==
=== Background ===
The Equality Act 2010 prohibits discrimination based on protected characteristics in the act, including sexual orientation. However, the Church of England and other religious groups that do not agree with same-sex relationships are allowed to not employ gay people if they are sexually active or in civil partnerships. Same-sex marriage in England and Wales began in late March 2014, when the Marriage (Same Sex Couples) Act 2013 came into force.

In April 2014, Pemberton married his partner Laurence Cunnington. Pemberton met Cunnington on a support website for gay fathers in 2008 and both had been previously married to women for several decades. Pemberton and his former wife have five adult children. The marriage occurred despite an official ban on same-sex marriages from the Church of England's House of Bishops in February 2014, who instead allowed civil partnerships between members of the same gender, within a celibate relationship. The Marriage (Same Sex Couples) Act 2013 meant that religious institutions which do not agree with same-sex marriage—such as the Church of England, which defines marriage as between one man and one woman in its canon law—did not have to perform same-sex marriage ceremonies. These exemptions came following extensive lobbying by conservative Anglicans.

=== Chaplaincy move and legal action ===
In 2014, Pemberton lived in Southwell and preached in Southwell Minster. He had a job as a hospital chaplain in the Diocese of Lincoln for an NHS trust (an organisational trust within the National Health Service (NHS)) in Lincolnshire but sought work closer to home at King's Mill Hospital. Pemberton spoke to the Bishop of Lincoln, Christopher Lowson, prior to his move. Lowson had no initial objections but later issued an official written rebuke to the couple.

The Archbishop of York (whose ecclesiastical jurisdiction includes Southwell), John Sentamu, an opponent of same-sex marriage, opposed Pemberton's move. Following consultation with Sentamu, Bishop Richard Inwood refused Pemberton permission to officiate (PTO) in the Diocese of Southwell and Nottingham. A PTO is only rarely revoked, usually only when the law is broken. As a result, the NHS refused his chaplaincy at King's Mill Hospital, though he still worked for the Lincolnshire NHS trust.

In response, Pemberton threatened legal action against the church. This led to a tribunal. Pemberton approached three barristers and the church hired the law firm Herbert Smith Freehills. At the tribunal, a registrar of the Diocese of London, a solicitor for Justin Welby, the Archbishop of Canterbury, a legal secretary from the church's general synod, and a legal representative of the church's pensions board were present, among others. Thomas Linden QC, representing the church, took an aggressive line against Pemberton, calling him "errant", "not in good standing" and heavily chastising him for crying over the revocation of his PTO.

The tribunal upheld the church's position, saying that supporting the church's position on same-sex marriage was a requirement of being a Church of England chaplain, and that the act allows religious groups exemptions in anti-employment discrimination law. This judgement was criticised by the LGBT rights activists Peter Tatchell, Christina Beardsley and Davis Mac-Iyalla, and the LGBT rights charity Stonewall.

Pemberton appealed the decision, but the Employment Appeal Tribunal dismissed his appeal in 2016. The Court of Appeal also dismissed his case in 2018.

Precisely five years after his marriage, Equal, the Campaign for Equal Marriage in the Church of England, was founded to end bans on same-sex marriages in churches and to allow clergy to marry people of the same sex.
