= Ecumenical Catholic Church of Christ =

Independent Catholic denomination

- Abbreviation: ECCC
- Classification: Western Christian
- Orientation: Independent Catholic
- Polity: Episcopal
- Archbishop: Karl Rodig
- Headquarters: Detroit, Michigan
- Founder: Karl Rodig
- Origin: 1998; Florida, United States
- Official website: ecumenicalccc.org

The Ecumenical Catholic Church of Christ (ECCC) is an Independent Catholic denomination founded by Archbishop Karl Rodig originally as The Reformed Roman Catholic and Apostolic Church. Headquartered in Detroit, Michigan, the ECCC uses a former Roman Catholic parish as its Cathedral of Saint Anthony. The Ecumenical Catholic Church of Christ aims to minister to disaffected Roman Catholics and others.

== History ==
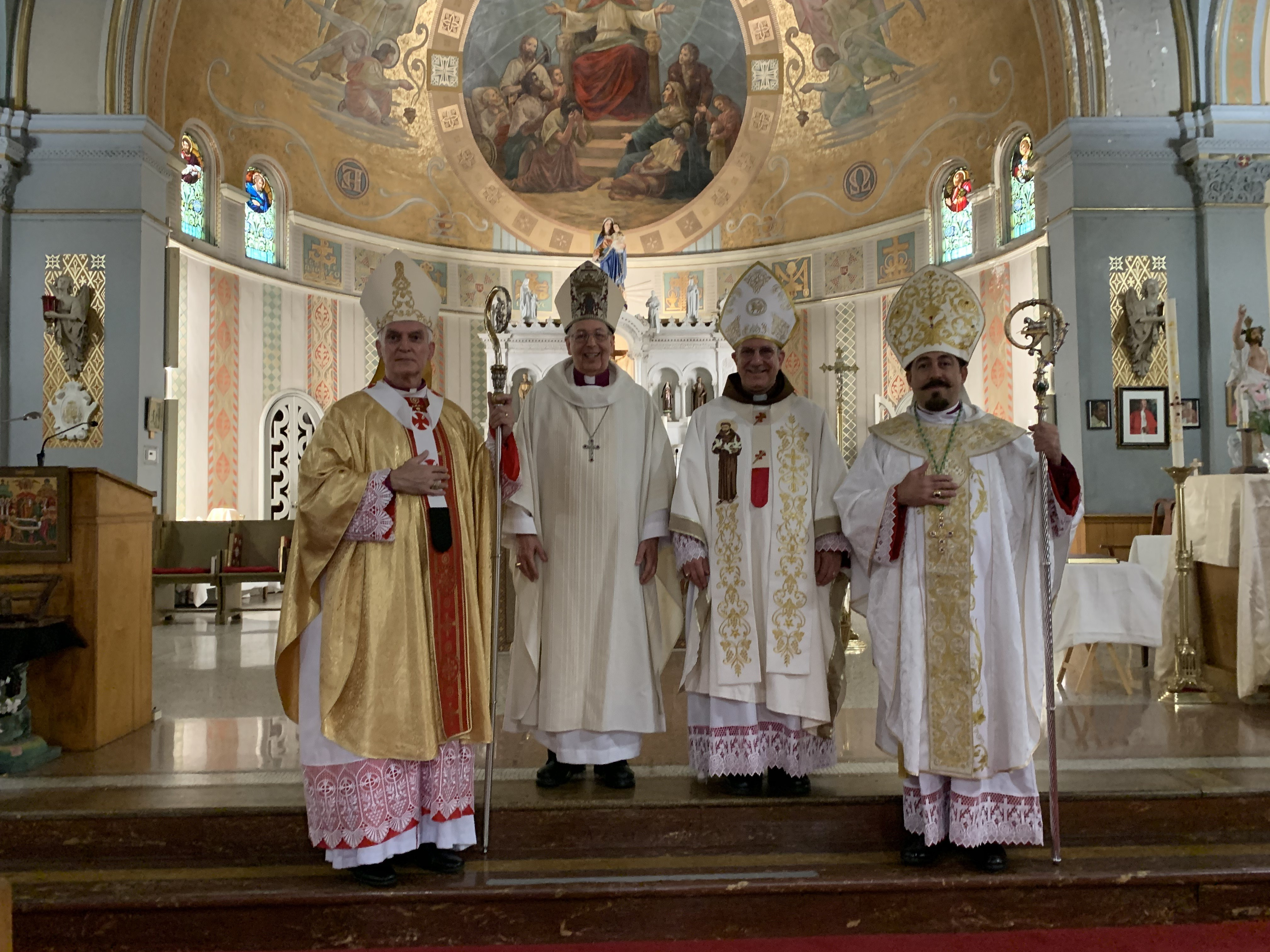
Bishops of Ecumenical Catholic Church of Christ in USA

The Ecumenical Catholic Church of Christ was originally founded in 1998 as The Reformed Roman Catholic and Apostolic Church after Karl Rodig left the Catholic Church, initially disagreeing with clerical celibacy. In 1999, Rodig was consecrated by Archbishop Maurice McCormick of the Old Catholic Church in North America and was therefore excommunicated latae sententiae by the Catholic Church.

In 2007, the church changed its name to the Ecumenical Catholic Church of Christ. The church also merged with Christ Catholic Church International in Niagara Falls, Ontario, Canada.

By 2010, Rodig purchased the shuttered Catholic parish of Saint Anthony Cathedral in Detroit, Michigan; the church was closed between 2006 and 2007 by the Roman Catholic Archdiocese of Detroit. Following this purchase, Rodig and the Ecumenical Catholic Church of Christ were considered invalidly ordained by the Archdiocese of Detroit, although clergy in the ECCC validate themselves through the dogma of sacramental character.

With the death of Bishop Mark Steven Shirilau in the similarly named Ecumenical Catholic Church—and the appointment of David John Kalke in 2014—some churches realigned themselves to the Ecumenical Catholic Church of Christ.

Between 2020 and 2022, the church's founding archbishop ordained and consecrated clergy in and for Europe, Kenya, and the Middle East. In May 2022 Primate Abp Karl Rodig, with other bishops of Ecumenical Catholic Church of Christ in the United States, consecrated Fr. Edik Baroni as a Bishop in charge of the communities in the Middle East for Persian and other communities worldwide. In 2021, it has also built a presence in India, to the derision of the Roman Catholic Archdiocese of Bombay.

== Doctrine ==
The ECCC affirms married clergy and women's ordination. The church also affirms and ordains LGBTQ+ clergy.
