= David Farmbrough =

Bishop of Bedford (1929–2013)

The Rt Revd David Farmbrough MA(Oxon)
- Bishop of Bedford
- Diocese: Diocese of St Albans
- In office: 1981–93
- Predecessor: Andrew Graham
- Successor: John Richardson
- Other posts: Honorary assistant bishop in St Albans (1994–present); Archdeacon of St Albans (1974–81)

Orders
- Ordination: 1953 (deacon); 1954 (priest)
- Consecration: 1981

Personal details
- Born: 4 May 1929
- Died: 9 March 2013 (aged 83) Bromham, Bedfordshire
- Denomination: Anglican
- Parents: Charles and Ida
- Spouse: Angela Hill (m. 1955)
- Profession: Clergyman and writer
- Education: Lincoln College, Oxford

David John Farmbrough (4 May 1929 – 9 March 2013) was Bishop of Bedford from 1981 to 1993.

Farmbrough was educated at Bedford School and Lincoln College, Oxford before embarking on an ecclesiastical career with a curacy at Bishop's Hatfield, after which he was priest in charge of St John's Church in the same parish.

Following this he was Vicar of Bishop's Stortford. Later he became Rural Dean of the area and then (his final appointment before ordination to the episcopate) Archdeacon of St Albans (1974–1981). In retirement he served the Diocese of St Albans as an assistant bishop.

Church of England titles
Preceded by Alec Graham	Bishop of Bedford; 1981–1993	Succeeded by John Richardson
