= Thomas Wood (bishop of Bedford) =

The Rt Rev Claude Thomas Thelluson Wood MC (27 February 1885 – 17 January 1961) was an eminent Bishop in the mid part of the twentieth century.

He was born on 27 February 1885 and educated at Eton and Trinity College, Cambridge. After a curacy at Hatfield, he spent ten years in the Army Chaplains' Department to the Territorial Army. He was in France from 1915 where he was awarded the Military Cross 'for service in the Field' and was Mentioned in Despatches. His service was summarised in 1918 as 'good report'.

He served as vicar at Croydon and Tring and was then successively Rural Dean of Berkhamsted, Archdeacon of St Albans and then Bishop of Bedford. Wood was recommended for the post in 1948 by the Bishop of St Albans who, in his letter to the Prime Minister, referred to Wood's service in the Great War. Clement Attlee, like Winston Churchill, preferred men who had shown their mettle in the Great War. Wood remained in post for only 5 years because of a car crash in which he damaged his pelvis. He died on 17 January 1961.'His was one of the most unspectacular of careers of service which are the greatest strength of the Church', wrote the Church Times obituarist.

== Notes ==
Church of England titles
Preceded by Interregnum	Bishop of Bedford; 1948–1953	Succeeded by Angus Campbell MacInnes
