= Richard Atkinson (bishop) =

Anglican bishop (born 1958)

The Right Reverend Richard Atkinson OBE
- Bishop of Bedford
- Church: Church of England
- Diocese: Diocese of St Albans
- In office: May 2012–present
- Predecessor: Richard Inwood
- Other post: Archdeacon of Leicester (2002–2012)

Orders
- Ordination: 1985
- Consecration: 17 May 2012

Personal details
- Born: 17 December 1958 (age 67)
- Denomination: Anglican
- Residence: Bishop's Lodge, Cardington, Bedford
- Spouse: Helen Atkinson
- Children: 3
- Education: Magdalene College, Cambridge

Richard William Bryant Atkinson, OBE (born 17 December 1958) is a British Anglican bishop. Since 2012, he has been the suffragan Bishop of Bedford in the Diocese of St Albans. He had been Archdeacon of Leicester from 2002 to 2012.

== Early life and education ==
Atkinson was educated at St Paul's School, London, Magdalene College, Cambridge and Ripon College Cuddesdon.

== Ordained ministry ==
He was ordained in 1985 and was a curate in Abingdon. After this he held incumbencies in Sheffield and Rotherham. In the 2012 Queen's Birthday Honours, he was appointed an Officer of the Order of the British Empire (OBE) "for services to unemployed people in Rotherham, South Yorkshire". He was the Archdeacon of Leicester between 2002 and 2012.

In March 2012, Atkinson was announced as the next Bishop of Bedford, a suffragan bishop in the Diocese of St Albans in succession to Richard Inwood. He was consecrated by Rowan Williams, Archbishop of Canterbury, in St Paul's Cathedral on Ascension Day 2012. A Service of Welcome into the Diocese took place at St Paul's Church, Bedford on 19 May 2012 at which Atkinson also preached his first sermon as a bishop.

Upon the announcement of his appointment as bishop, Atkinson said: "I am looking forward enormously to getting to know the diversity and depth of the communities of Bedfordshire and Luton. I am enthusiastic to enable and equip the Church to reach out in love and service to our contemporary world, and committed to speaking up for the marginalised, poor and vulnerable."

=== Views ===
He participated in the Congress of Leaders of World and Traditional Religions in the capital of Kazakhstan in 2013. The forum is widely recognised by the international community for its efforts in promoting religious tolerance and peace.

In 2023, he was one of 44 Church of England bishops who signed an open letter supporting the use of the Prayers of Love and Faith (i.e. blessings for same-sex couples) and called for "Guidance being issued without delay that includes the removal of all restrictions on clergy entering same-sex civil marriages, and on bishops ordaining and licensing such clergy".

== Personal life ==
Richard has three children; Charlotte, Naomi and William. He is married to Professor Dame Helen Atkinson. She was made CBE in the Queen’s New Year’s Honours 2014 and DBE in the Queen’s Birthday Honours 2021 for services to Engineering and Education. She is a Fellow of the Royal Academy of Engineering, the highest honour for an engineer in the UK.

He is currently a Governor of Bedfordshire University, Chair of One YMCA and a Trustee of the Just Finance Foundation. He was Chair of the Eastern Region Ministry Course for a number of years.

== Styles ==
- The Reverend Richard Atkinson (c. 1985–2002)
- The Venerable Richard Atkinson (2002–2012)
- The Right Reverend Richard Atkinson (2012–present)
