= Basil Guy (bishop) =

Anglican bishop (1910–1975)

Basil Tudor Guy (9 March 1910 – 29 April 1975) was an Anglican bishop in the 20th century.

Guy was born on 9 March 1910 and educated at Forest School and Keble College, Oxford. After a curacy at Wanstead, he was Vicar of Bradninch then St Eustachius' Church, Tavistock before his appointment as Archdeacon of Bedford in 1956. A year later he was elevated to Bishop of Bedford in 1957. Five years later he was translated to Gloucester where he stayed until his death from cancer on 29 April 1975.

Church of England titles
Preceded by Angus Campbell MacInnes	Bishop of Bedford; 1957 – 1962	Succeeded by Albert John Trillo
Preceded by Wilfred Marcus Askwith	Bishop of Gloucester; 1962 – 1975	Succeeded by John Yates
