= Robert Billing =

Anglican bishop (1834–1898)

Robert Claudius Billing
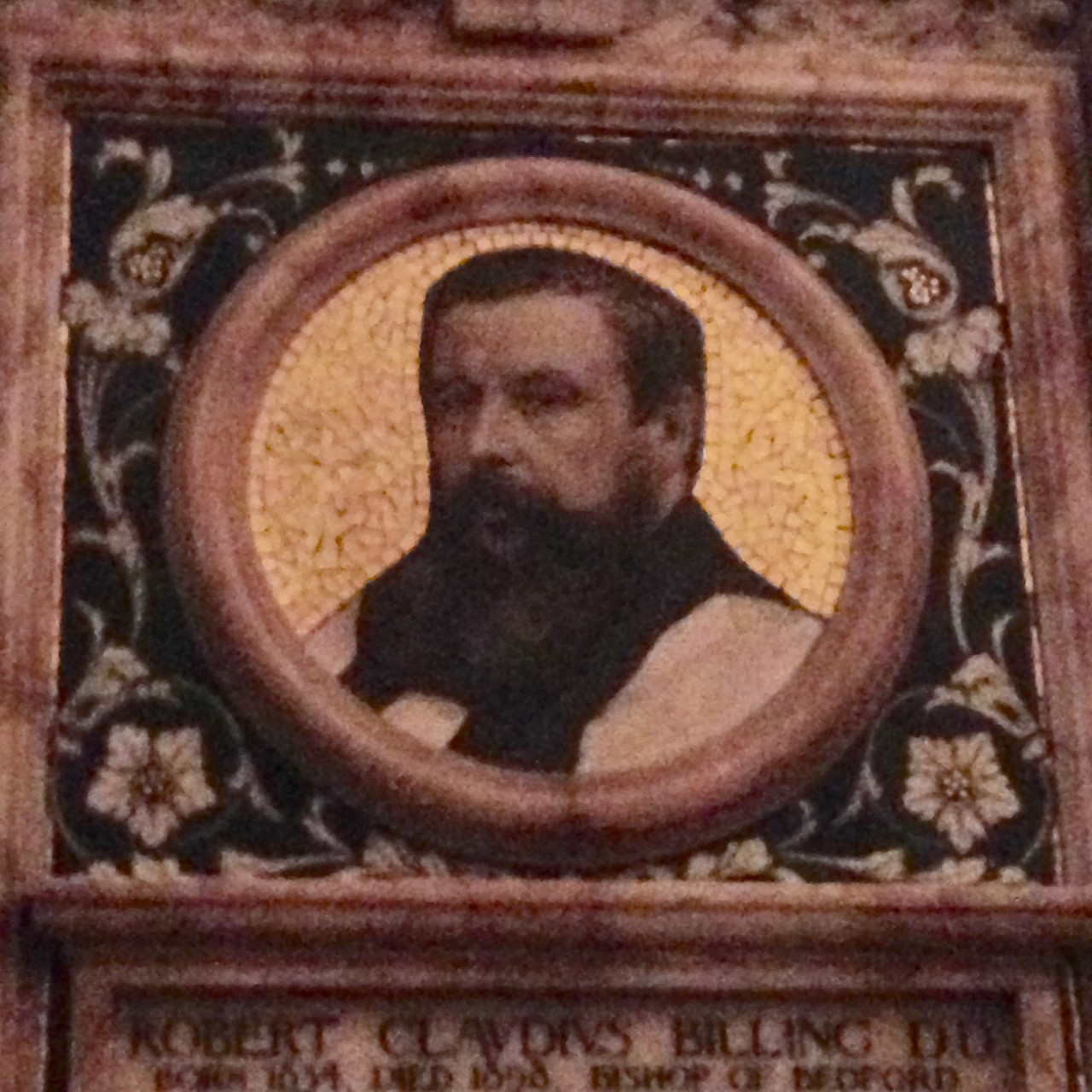
- Mosaic image of Robert Claudius Billing, Bishop of Bedford on his memorial at St Paul's Cathedral
- Born: 15 April 1834; Maidstone, Kent
- Died: 21 February 1898 (aged 63); Englefield Green, Windsor, England
- Education: Worcester College, Oxford
- Title: Bishop of Bedford
- Spouse: Harriet Fowler Price
- Children: Claudine Margaret Billing; Robert Percy Billing; Herbert Lindsey Billing; Arthur Hans Billing; Aubrey Field Billing

Robert Claudius Billing (15 April 1834 – 21 February 1898) was an Anglican bishop who served as Bishop of Bedford (a suffragan bishop to the Bishop of London) from 1888 to 1898.

== Early life ==
Billing was born in Maidstone, Kent in 1834, the eldest of five children. His mother was Ann Green, originally from Nottingham, and his father was Rev. Robert Billing, perpetual curate of Wye from 1846 to 1854, and recorded in the 1851 census as Perpetual Curate and Master of the Wye Grammar School.

== Education ==
He was educated at Worcester College, Oxford, matriculating (enrolling) on 25 October 1853 aged 19, graduating and being ordained in 1857. Nine year later he was awarded an MA in 1868 and in 1888 he received the honorary degree of DD [Doctor of Divinity] when appointed as the Bishop of Bedford.

== Career ==
Billing began his career with a curacy at St Peter's, Colchester between 1857 and 1860, and then in Compton Bishop, Somerset from 1861 This was followed by a period as Secretary of the Church Missionary Society. In 1863 he became Vicar at Holy Trinity in Louth the living consisting of a vicarage endowed by the Ecclesiastical Commissioners with £300 a year (in 1872), in the gift of the Bishop of Lincoln. He continued to act as an honorary assistant secretary for the Church Missionary Society, editing their publication Missionary Leaves. He also held the role of Chaplain of the Manor of Worlaby near Brigg, Lincolnshire, in 1870, before moving to London in 1873.

After ten years, he became Vicar of Holy Trinity in Islington, London. He was then promoted to Rural Dean of Spitalfields in 1878 and 7 July 1888 The Morning Post announced in their Whitehall notices that:

"The Queen has been pleased to direct letters patent to be passed under the Great Seal of the United Kingdom of Great Britain and Ireland for presenting Doctor Robert Claudius Billing to the Rectory of St Andrew Undershaft with St Mary-at-Axe, in the city and diocese of London, void by the appointment of Doctor William Walsham How to the Bishopric of Wakefield."

His work in the London slum areas of east and north London was testing but the church though highly of his work and he was appointed as Bishop suffragan of Bedford in 1888. (He was Bishop during the era of the Jack the Ripper attacks). As bishop, he was given responsibility for the rural deaneries of Islington, Shoreditch, and St Sepulchre (outside the City) on top of his predecessor's oversight of the East End.

"His work as Rector and Rural Dean of Spitalfields was so conspicuous that on the translation of the Bishop Walsham How to Wakefield he was appointed Bishop of Bedford…. The work which this entailed told severely upon his health, so severely in fact that he completely broke down. He took a long period of rest but was compelled in 1895 to resign his bishopric while retaining his old position of Rector of St. Andrew Undershaft in the city in the east end of London few men were better known or more highly popular."

He supported the volunteer movement, and was chaplain of the 2nd Tower Hamlets Volunteers during his time in London.

== Personal life ==
Billing married Harriet Fowler Price (1831-1899), daughter of George Price of Langford, Somerset on 1 January 1862 at Churchill, Somerset. They had five children, one daughter and four sons. Claudine Margaret (1865–1936), Robert Percy (1866–1891), Herbert Lindsey (1869–1900) and Arthur Hans (1872–1915) were all born during the family's time in Louth, Lincolnshire. Their final son Aubrey Field (1874–1934) was born in Islington, London.

== Death ==
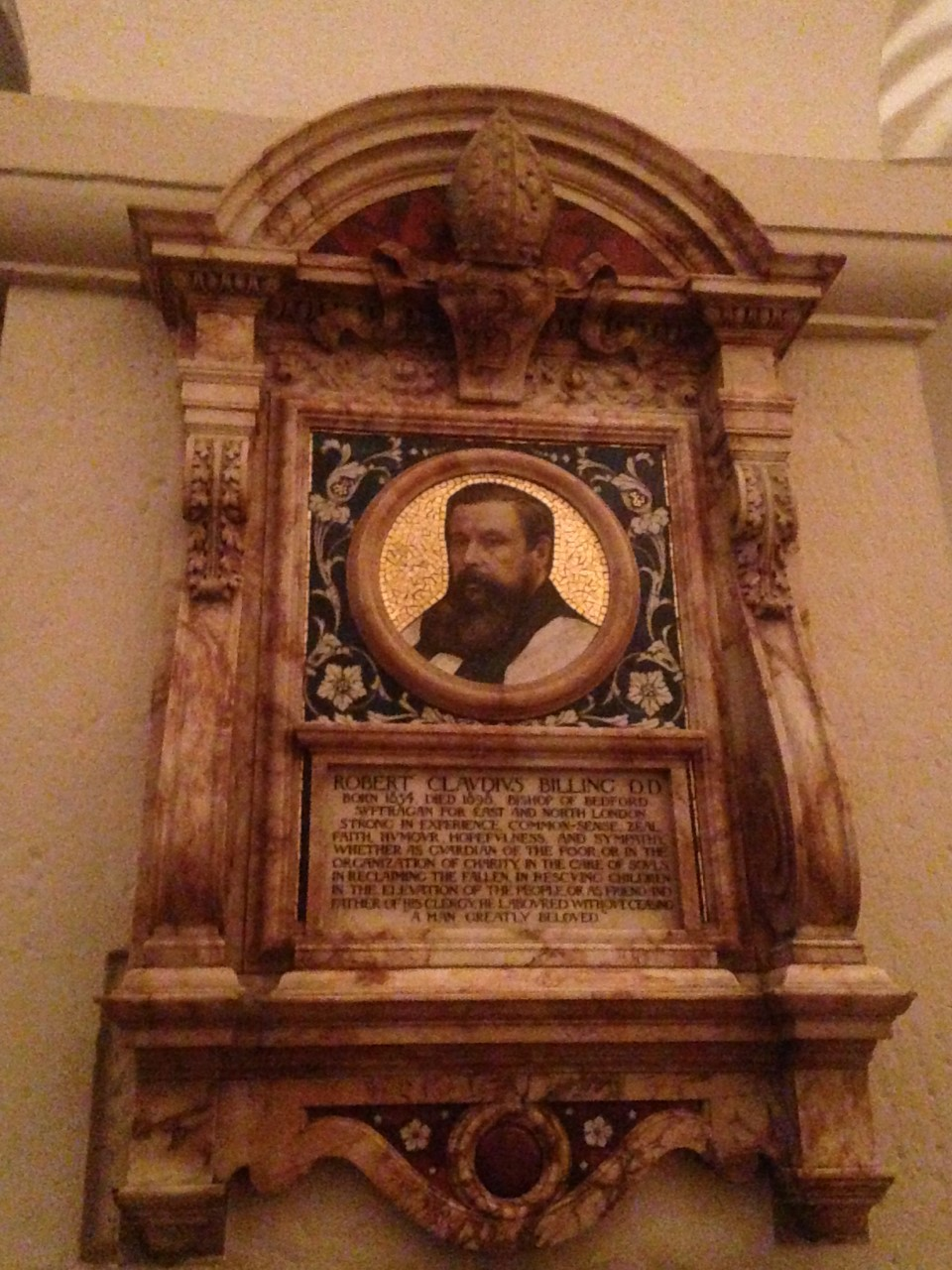
Memorial to Robert Claudius Billing in St Paul's Cathedral London

He died at his home in Englefield Green, (technically) in post in 1898, having ceased active work in 1895 due to ill health. His duties were taken on by the Bishop of Stepney. The Times reported, "Bishop Billing had been an invalid for several years past, an affection of the brain having disabled him from transacting even work of a routine character."

His wife, Harriet, died on 21 March 1899 at Tilehurst Villa, Sion Hill, Bath.

== Memorial ==
A memorial to Billing can be seen in the Crypt at St Paul's Cathedral.

The inscription reads:

"Robert Claudius Billing DD Born 1834 died 1898 Bishop of Bedford. Suffragan for east and north London. Strong in experience, common-sense, zeal, faith, humour, hopefulness and sympathy, whether as guardian of the poor or in the organisation of charity for the care of souls, in reclaiming the fallen in rescuing children, in the elevation of the people or as friend and Father of his clergy. He laboured without ceasing. A man greatly beloved."

Church of England titles
Preceded by Walsham How	Bishop of Bedford; 1888–1898	Vacant Title next held by Lumsden Barkway
