= John Richardson (bishop of Bedford) =

- Bishop of Bedford
- Diocese: Diocese of St Albans
- In office: 1994–2002
- Predecessor: David Farmbrough
- Successor: Richard Inwood
- Other posts: Honorary assistant bishop in Carlisle and in Newcastle (2003–present)

Orders
- Ordination: 1963 (deacon); 1964 (priest)
- Consecration: 1994

Personal details
- Born: 11 July 1937 (age 89)
- Denomination: Anglican
- Parents: John & Elizabeth
- Spouse: Felicity-Anne Lowes (m. 1963)
- Children: 3 daughters
- Education: Trinity Hall, Cambridge

John Henry Richardson (born 11 July 1937) is a retired Church of England bishop. From 1994 to 2002, he was Bishop of Bedford (a suffragan bishop in the Diocese of St Albans, now serving in retirement as an honorary assistant bishop in the Dioceses of Carlisle and of Newcastle.

== Early life ==
Richardson was born the son of John Richardson, sometime Archdeacon of Derby. Like his father, he was educated at Winchester and Trinity Hall, Cambridge, gaining the degree of Cambridge Master of Arts (MA Cantab).

== Priest ==
He was made a deacon on Trinity Sunday 1963 (9 June) and ordained a priest the Trinity Sunday following (24 May 1964), both times by Michael Gresford Jones, Bishop of St Albans, at St Albans Cathedral. Richardson began his ministry with curacies in Stevenage and Eastbourne. He became Vicar of Chipperfield, then Rural Dean of Rickmansworth and finally, before his appointment to the episcopate, Vicar of St Michael's, Bishops Stortford.

== Bishop ==
He was consecrated a bishop on 23 February 1994, by George Carey, Archbishop of Canterbury, at Westminster Abbey. Richardson served as the Bishop of Bedford, a suffragan bishop in the Diocese of St Albans. He retired in 2002, but has since served the church in retirement as an honorary assistant bishop elsewhere.

== Family ==
In 1963, John Richardson married Felicity-Anne. They have three daughters.

== Later life ==
In retirement, Richardson continues to serve the Church, as an honorary assistant bishop in the Dioceses of Carlisle and of Newcastle.

Church of England titles
Preceded by David Farmbrough	Bishop of Bedford; 1994–2002	Succeeded by Richard Inwood
