= Permission to officiate =

Ministry licence within the Church of England

A permission to officiate (PTO), also known as a licence to officiate, is a concessionary ministry licence granted by an Anglican bishop.

== Details ==
It is most commonly issued to a retired deacon, priest, or lay reader over the age of 70 years. It allows the person to continue to perform the duties of their calling within the diocese (or part thereof, as may be specified in the license) for a limited period of time.

A cleric who was ordained priest or deacon by an overseas bishop needs to have permission to officiate from the archbishop of the province in which he or she intends to officiate before applying to the diocesan bishop for a diocesan licence or permission to officiate.

A permission to officiate is usually only removed for egregious wrongdoing, such as breaking the law, although Jeremy Pemberton had his removed for marrying another man which, though conforming with civil law, was in contravention of the Church's canon law, which defines marriage as being between only one man and one woman. George Carey, former archbishop of Canterbury, had his PTO revoked and reinstated several times, due to failures to consider child protection in regard to abuser John Smyth.
