= Reformed Catholic Church =

Independent Catholic denomination

Reformed Catholics was an Independent Catholic denomination founded in New York City, United States, in 1879, by some priests who left the Catholic Church. It was not in communion with the pope in Rome.

Dissident formerly Catholic priests formed a few congregations chiefly in New York.
