= Richard Inwood =

The Right Reverend Richard Inwood
- Bishop of Bedford
- Diocese: Diocese of St Albans
- In office: 2003–31 March 2012 (retired)
- Other posts: Archdeacon of Halifax (1995–2003); Acting Bishop of Southwell & Nottingham (9 April 2014–8 April 2015)

Orders
- Ordination: c. 1974-6
- Consecration: 7 March 2003

Personal details
- Born: 4 March 1946
- Died: 14 April 2019 (aged 73)
- Denomination: Anglican
- Residence: Derby
- Spouse: Liz
- Children: 3 adult daughters
- Education: University College, Oxford

Richard Neil Inwood (4 March 1946 - 14 April 2019) was a Bishop suffragan of Bedford.

Inwood was born in Burton-on-Trent and studied chemistry at University College, Oxford and theology at the University of Nottingham. Before his ordination, he spent a year teaching in north-west Uganda and worked as a research and development chemist with Imperial Chemical Industries (ICI) in Manchester for nearly two years. He served in Sheffield, London, Bath, and Yeovil before being appointment Archdeacon of Halifax in 1995. He was consecrated a bishop by Rowan Williams, Archbishop of Canterbury at Southwark Cathedral on 7 March 2003.

From 9 April 2014 to 8 April 2015, he was Acting Bishop of Southwell and Nottingham at the request of the Archbishop of York. As acting bishop, Inwood attracted media attention in June 2014 for revoking the permission to officiate of a gay priest, Jeremy Pemberton, who had legally married his partner in spite of a pastoral statement issued by the church's bishops. In August 2014, Pemberton had an offer of employment at Sherwood Forest Hospitals NHS Foundation Trust withdrawn following Inwood's refusal to grant the necessary license.

Inwood was the co-author of Moved by Steam: Beside the tracks and on the trains 1962-67 with Mike Smith (Kettering, 2009 ISBN 978-1-85794-323-8). His wife, Liz, is a mathematics teacher and examiner.

Inwood died on 14 April 2019.

== Styles ==
- Richard Inwood Esq (1946–c1975)
- The Revd Richard Inwood (c1975–1995)
- The Ven Richard Inwood (1995–2003)
- The Rt Revd Richard Inwood (2003–2019)

Church of England titles
Preceded by David Hallatt	Archdeacon of Halifax; 1995–2003	Succeeded by Robert Freeman
Preceded by John Richardson	Bishop of Bedford; 2003–31 March 2012	Succeeded by Richard Atkinson
Preceded by Tony Porter (Acting)	Acting Bishop of Southwell and Nottingham; 9 April 2014–8 April 2015	Succeeded by Tony Porter (Acting)
