= North American Old Catholic Church =

Independent Catholic church community

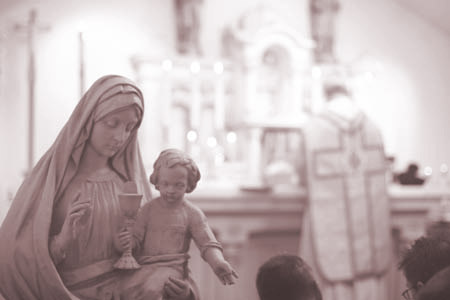
Bishop Thomas H. Hooker Jr celebrates the Eucharist at St. Mychal Judge Church

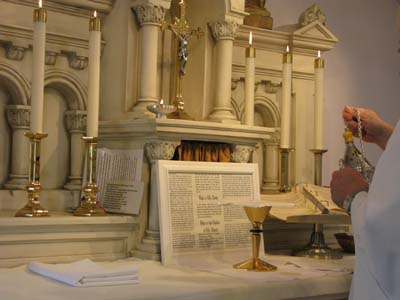
Archbishop Wynn Wagner celebrates the Eucharist. He was NAOCC's Vicar General and president of the Worldwide Conference of Old Catholic Churches.

The North American Old Catholic Church (NAOCC) is a community of 22 independent Catholic churches based in the United States and Canada.

== History ==
The North American Old Catholic Church was formed in January 2007 in Louisville, Kentucky, as a community of independent Catholic churches, with Archbishop Michael Seneco (October 29, 1965-July 9, 2026) being elected as the community's first presiding bishop. This United States-based organization traced its history to an 1870 movement in the Netherlands that dissented from the Roman Catholic Church largely over the 1869 First Vatican Council doctrine of papal infallibility, a dogma of the Catholic Church which states that the pope is preserved from the possibility of error in certain circumstances.

In 2009, the group included twenty Old Catholic churches in the United States, with Washington, D.C., Texas, and Maryland each having two parishes, Florida having three, and the rest located in other states.
