= Davis Mac-Iyalla =

Nigerian LGBTQ rights activist

- Born: 1972 (age 53–54); Port Harcourt
- Citizenship: Nigerian
- Occupation: LGBT rights activist.

Davis Mac-Iyalla (born 1972 in Port Harcourt) is a Nigerian LGBT rights activist. He established the Nigerian wing of the British Changing Attitude organization, which presses for internal reform of the Anglican Communion for further inclusion of Anglican sexual minorities.

== Early life ==
The son of a wealthy Nigerian Army Colonel, he came out to himself at the age of 14, but his disinterest in dating females was not made apparent to others around him until after two events: the ordination of Gene Robinson as the bishop of New Hampshire in the Episcopalian branch, and the death of his mentor, the Bishop Iyobee Ugede of Otukpo.

== Career and activism ==
He was, in July 2003, fired from his job as the principal of a local Anglican children's school; after this incident, which he believed was due to his being gay, he became an activist and started work with Changing Attitude.

He has faced stiff opposition from both the religious elite and their lay constituents in Nigeria, which is a heavily conservative nation in terms of politics. The church of Nigeria has issued a disclaimer against Mac-Iyalla on their website. However, Mac-Iyalla has met with the primate of the Nigerian Church, Peter Akinola, who is most well known for leading an internal faction of the worldwide communion against welcoming actions towards LGBT Anglicans by the British Anglican and U.S. Episcopal churches.

Mac-Iyalla has ventured to other countries with Anglican communities on speaking tours.

An immigration attorney at the offices of Episcopal Migration Ministries in New York advised Davis to seek asylum in the US, but he decided not to proceed with the claim. He was granted refugee status in the United Kingdom.

He has been accused by Nigerian Anglicans as a charlatan who made up his life story, most notably by Canon Akintunde Popoola, but Mac-Iyalla posted photos of his time as a knight of the church during his younger years on the Web.

In 2016, he founded the Interfaith Diversity Network of West Africa to advocate for inclusion of LGBT people, based in Ghana. He moved to Accra to serve as the organization's executive director.

== See also ==
- LGBT rights in Nigeria

== See also ==
- Bisi Alimi - Nigerian man and civil rights activist who fled to the United Kingdom from retaliatory violence in Nigeria after coming out on national television.
