= Anglican Communion sexual abuse cases =

Series of investigations into crimes

Several allegations of child sexual abuse have been made against clergy, members of religious orders and lay members of the Anglican Communion for events dating as far back as the 1960s. In many cases, these allegations have resulted in investigations, trials, and convictions.

== Anglican Church of Australia ==
A 2013 study in Victoria, Australia, found that Anglican child sex abuse cases were one-tenth the number of Catholic Church sexual abuse cases.

However, a 2016 investigation found cases of child abuse in the Anglican Church of Australia, formerly known as the Church of England in Australia. During 27 January to 5 February 2016, the Australian Royal Commission into Institutional Responses to Child Sexual Abuse held public hearings. They centred on the Church of England Boys' Society (CEBS) and scrutinised the Anglican dioceses of Tasmania, Adelaide, Sydney, and Brisbane regarding "their responses to allegations of child sexual abuse" connected with CEBS. The royal commission examined "the systems and policies within the CEBS and the four Anglican dioceses, in relation to youth camps and activities, and raising and responding to concerns and complaints about child sexual abuse".

Regarding the Diocese of Brisbane and CEBS in that diocese, the royal commission interviewed a person (who cannot be named for legal reasons) who "complained of repeated sexual abuse" when he was "associated with the Church of England Boys Society". He also said that he had taken his complaint to Peter Hollingworth, former Anglican Archbishop of Brisbane, in August 1993. When Hollingworth was interviewed, he admitted his handling of the matter was poor. "After a great deal of consideration over the past 22 years I acknowledge unreservedly that my actions were misguided, wrong and a serious error of judgment and that I genuinely regret it", he said. Hollingworth was also questioned about "his handling of abuse claims at St Paul's School while he was Archbishop between 1989 and 2001". Hollingworth said he was sorry for the boys who were molested by the teachers. "I am appalled by the abuse you suffered at the hands of two school staff members from St Paul's School," he said.

A 2019 investigation into the activities of CEBS activities in the Sutherland Shire of Sydney between the late 1960s until 2013, also in relation to youth camps named "Rathane" as well as "Chaldercot" and "Deer Park" located in the Royal National Park facilities of the Anglican Church in the Port Hacking River region resulted in the arrest and conviction of a leader of the Church of England Boys Society.

== Anglican Church of Canada ==
In 2015 an apology was issued jointly by the Anglican Church of Canada dioceses of New Westminster and Calgary for failing to report to the police in 1994 a written confession of child sexual abuse by priest Gordon Goichi Nakayama. Nakayama abused over 300 children, mostly boys aged 3–20, over the course of 62 years of ministry. Nakayama died in 1995, a year after being charged with immorality by the Bishop of Calgary Barry Curtis and resigning from his position as priest. Nakayama's abuse has been the subject of two books by his daughter, notable Canadian author Joy Kogawa. In 2021 the Anglican Church of Canada and the National Association of Japanese Canadians jointly announced the establishment of a $610,000 healing fund to be used to address the legacy of Nakayama's sexual abuse.

== Church of England ==
There have been many cases of sexual abuse within the Church of England. In the 1970s concern was raised over Jeremy Dowling, a lay minister and employee of the Diocese of Truro, and a member of the general synod from 1977. Dowling was accused of sex abuse at specified schools and of sadistic behaviour. Maurice Key was Bishop of Truro at the time and until 1990; Michael Ball succeeded Key.

In 1993, Peter Ball, who had co-founded a monastic community called the Community of the Glorious Ascension with his brother Michael Ball in 1960, was the suffragan Bishop of Lewes in the Diocese of Chichester from 1977 to 1992 and then the diocesan Bishop of Gloucester from 1992 to 1993, resigned after admitting to an act of gross indecency with a 19-year-old former novice at the monastery, and accepting a formal police caution for it. Ball continued to serve in churches after that. During Peter Ball's trial in 2015, it emerged that in 1993 Crown Prosecution Service (CPS) lawyers had determined that "sufficient admissible, substantial and reliable evidence" existed that Ball had committed indecent assault and gross indecency. However, the Director of Public Prosecutions, Barbara Mills, had decided not to prosecute Ball, as a member of the royal family, a lord chief justice, JPs, cabinet ministers and public school headmasters—"many dozens" of people—had campaigned to support him at that time.

In 2007, Peter Halliday, a choirmaster in Guildford in Surrey, who had told the church that he had abused children in the 1990s but was allowed to continue working with children, was convicted of three counts of sexual abuse of children, and police were concerned that there had been many more cases.

In light of this event and the public airing of the church's bad handling of Halliday, as well as two other high-profile sexual abuse convictions, the House of Bishops decided in May 2007 to ask the Central Safeguarding Liaison Group to hold a review of past cases throughout the Church of England, which was carried out starting in 2008. The Diocese of Chichester and the Sussex Police also began investigating long-standing allegations of sexual abuse in East Sussex. The Chichester diocesan past review cases report was commissioned in 2009 and run by Roger Meekings.

In 2008, Colin Pritchard, a vicar in Bexhill-on-Sea was convicted of sexually abusing two boys; The Guardian described it as the "breakthrough case" for dealing with sexual abuse in the Chichester diocese. Roy Cotton, a priest in the Chichester diocese died in 2006 but allegations of abuse by him emerged shortly thereafter. In 2018, Pritchard, who by then had changed his name to Ifor Whittaker, was convicted of further sexual abuse that he had carried out in collaboration with Cotton.

In 2010 the Church of England past cases review was published.

In 2011 the Diocese of Chichester asked Elizabeth Butler-Sloss to conduct an independent review of the way the Pritchard and Cotton cases were handled by the Chichester diocese. In December 2011 the Archbishop of Canterbury opened an official inquiry (an archiepiscopal visitation) of the Chichester diocese due to the severity of the sexual abuse problem there; the last time such an inquiry had been established was in the 1890s.

The Meekings Chichester past cases review report was made public in February 2012 and the next day, the Church of England issued a rare public apology in response to the report's damning description of the way the church handled Cotton and Pritchard and failed to protect and care for people abused by them.

In March 2012 two retired Chichester vicars, Gordon Rideout and Robert Coles, were arrested based on information from the past cases review and the Butler-Sloss report.

In May 2012 the review and historic files about Peter Ball were given to the Sussex Police. Ball and another priest, Vickery House, were arrested in November 2012 and Ball was put on trial in 2014.

The Butler-Sloss report on the handling of Cotton and Pritchard was published in December 2012 and was severely criticised when it was released.

In 2014 the UK government set up the Independent Inquiry into Child Sexual Abuse to investigate how the government had handled allegations of sexual abuse and Butler-Sloss was appointed to lead it. Objections were raised to her participation. The final straw came when Phil Johnson, who by that time was a member of the National Safeguarding Panel for the church, and who had been abused by Cotton and Pritchard and had given testimony to Butler-Sloss during her 2011 inquiry, made it public that he had told Butler-Sloss about abuse by Peter Ball and that she had chosen to omit that in her report. The inquiry was disbanded and re-established the next year, and in November 2015 the panel said it would be include the Church of England and the Roman Catholic Church in its investigations.

In July 2015 Dowling was convicted of child sex abuse and sent to prison. Several bishops failed to take action over Dowling possibly because there was not an earlier prosecution. A few days later the Bishop of Durham said at a church synod that the 2003 abolition of defrocking may have been a mistake; it had been abolished over concerns about wrongful convictions.

In October 2015, Ball was sentenced to 32 months' imprisonment for sexual abuse after admitting the abuse of 18 young men over a period of 15 years from 1977 to 1992. Further charges of indecently assaulting two boys, aged 13 and 15, were allowed to lie on file in a contentious decision by the CPS. Vickery House, was also convicted in October 2015 and was sentenced to serve 6 1/2 years in prison for sex assaults against men and a boy. House worked in the same diocese as Ball. House and Ball collaborated in abusing three victims. If Ball had not pleaded guilty both men would have been tried together. There was a long delay between the first complaints to the police over House and a proper police investigation.

The Anglican Diocese of Portsmouth had a number of sexual abuse convictions in the 1980s and 1990s. Bishop Timothy Bavin was the bishop between 1985 and 1996 and during this time a number of serious safeguarding issues took place. For example, Bavin did not report Father Terry Knight to the police when parents raised their concerns to him in 1985. Father Knight was allowed to carry on in his position until he was later convicted for sexually abusing boys in 1996 and again in 2016. Bavin had also allowed a convicted paedophile priest, Father Michael Gover, to carry on working for the church on his release in 1990. Father Gover was convicted in 1985 at around the same time as parents raised their concerns about Father Knight. Bavin stood down in 1995 whilst Father Terry Knight's police investigation and court case was taking place.

In March 2016, the "first independent review commissioned by the Church of England into its handling of a sex abuse case" issued a 21-page report by Ian Elliott, a safeguarding expert. The Church published only its conclusions and recommendations and "acknowledged the report was 'embarrassing and uncomfortable' reading". The review centred on the case of "Joe" – described in the report as survivor "B". In July 2014, Joe had "reported the abuse to the church’s safeguarding officers". He sued the church in October 2015. The church paid £35,000 in compensation and called the abuse is "a matter of deep shame and regret".

The review criticised the office of Justin Welby, the Archbishop of Canterbury. It said that Welby's office failed "to respond meaningfully to repeated efforts by the survivor throughout 2015 to bring his case to the church leader’s attention".

Speaking on behalf of the church, Sarah Mullally, Bishop of Crediton, said that Welby has made "a personal commitment to seeing all the recommendations implemented quickly". The eleven recommendations included (1) training clergy (especially those in senior positions) to keep records and take action for those who report abuse and (2) the church should insure that "pastoral care of survivors takes precedence over protection of reputation or financial considerations". Bishop Mullally "is drawing up an action plan to implement the report's proposals, covering education and training, communication and structural change".

=== Abuse Redress Measure 2025 ===
The General Synod of the Church of England passed the Abuse Redress Measure 2025 to provide for redress for victims of sexual abuse in the Church of England.

The measure had followed years of debate on how exactly to set up a permanent scheme. A pilot scheme, known as the Interim Support Scheme had been established in 2020. Applications for the Interim Support Scheme ended on 1 October 2026. The CofE launched the Survivor Support Fund on 1 October 2026 aimed at helping survivors of CofE abuse prior to the launch of the Church of England Redress Scheme which is planned to open in late 2026.

== Church in Wales ==
There have been many cases of sexual abuse within the Church in Wales.

== Anglican Church in New Zealand ==
The Anglican Church in New Zealand has historically had instances of sexual abuse of children, adults, and clergy. The abuse took place in church-run schools as well as churches, and the church was accused of attempting to cover up the sexual crimes.

In March 2021, the church was part of a nationwide inquiry into sexual abuse in churches. As part of this inquiry it emerged that many documents pertaining to the sexual abuse of people in the church from the 1990s had gone missing.

== See also ==
- Catholic Church sexual abuse cases
- Mormon abuse cases
- Teresa Cooper
