= Bishop of Truro =

Diocesan bishop in the Church of England

- Bishopric

anglican
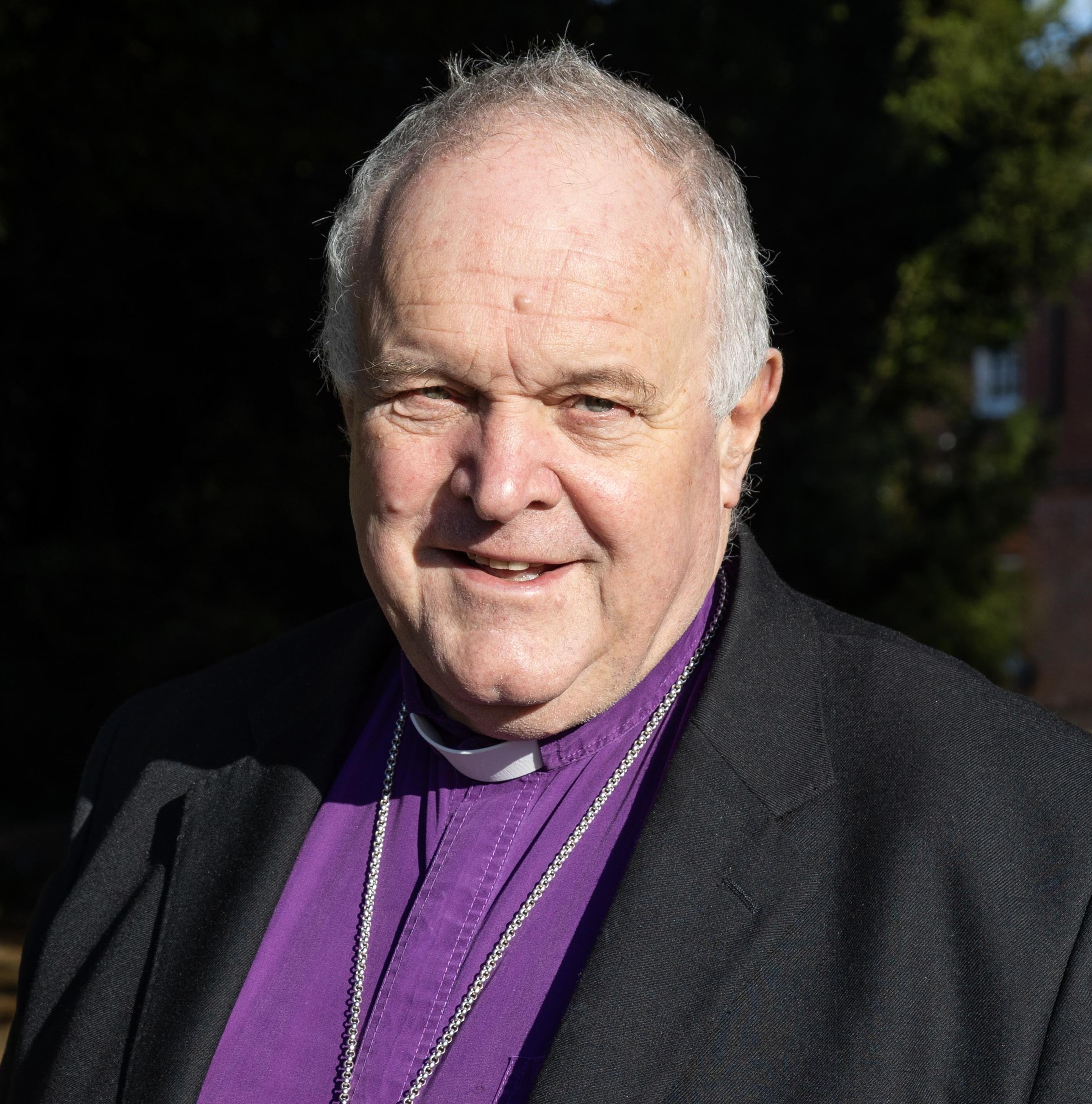

- Coat of arms of the Diocese of Truro
- Incumbent: David Williams

Location
- Ecclesiastical province: Canterbury
- Residence: "Lis Escop", Feock, Cornwall

Information
- First holder: Edward White Benson
- Established: 1876
- Diocese: Truro
- Cathedral: Truro Cathedral

The bishop of Truro is the ordinary (diocesan bishop) of the Church of England Diocese of Truro in the Province of Canterbury.

== History ==
There had been between the 9th and 11th centuries a bishopric of Cornwall until it was merged with Crediton and the sees were transferred to Exeter in 1050.

The Diocese of Truro was established by Act of Parliament in 1876 under Queen Victoria. It was created by the division of the Diocese of Exeter in 1876 approximately along the Devon-Cornwall border (a few parishes of Devon west of the River Tamar were included in the new diocese). The bishop's seat is located at Truro Cathedral and the official residence at "Lis Escop" in Feock, south of Truro. The Bishop of Truro is assisted by the suffragan Bishop of St Germans in overseeing the diocese.

Until they moved to Feock the bishops resided in Kenwyn. "Lis Escop" (the Kenwyn vicarage of 1780) became after the establishment of the Diocese of Truro the bishop's residence. After the bishops moved out for some years it housed part of Truro Cathedral School (closed 1981) then the Community of the Epiphany (Anglican nuns) and is now, as Epiphany House, a Christian retreat and conference centre. Lis escop is Cornish for "bishop's palace".

== List of bishops ==
Bishops of Truro
From	Until	Incumbent	Notes
1877	1883	Edward White Benson	Translated to Canterbury
1883	1891	George Wilkinson	Translated to St Andrews, Dunkeld & Dunblane; later became Primus of the Scottish Episcopal Church
1891	1906	John Gott	Confirmed 28 September 1891.
1906	1912	Charles Stubbs	
1912	1919	Winfrid Burrows	Translated to Chichester
1919	1923	Guy Warman	Translated to Chelmsford; later to Manchester
1923	1935	Walter Frere CR	
1935	1951	Joseph Hunkin	
1951	1960	Edmund Morgan	Translated from Southampton
1960	1973	Maurice Key	Translated from Sherborne
1973	1981	Graham Leonard	Translated from Willesden; later to London. Ordained a Roman Catholic priest in 1994.
1981	1989	Peter Mumford	Translated from Hertford
1990	1997	Michael Ball CGA	Translated from Jarrow. Founder of the Community of the Glorious Ascension with his twin brother.
1997	2008	Bill Ind	Translated from Grantham
2009	2017	Tim Thornton	Translated from Sherborne; resigned c. August 2017.
2017	2018	Chris Goldsmith, Bishop of St Germans	Acting diocesan bishop, August 2017 – 30 November 2018
2018	2023	Philip Mounstephen	Translated to Winchester
2023	2025	Hugh Nelson, Bishop of St Germans	Acting diocesan bishop, 17 September 2023 – 28 March 2025
2025	present	David Williams	Translated from Basingstoke, 28 March 2025.

== Assistant bishops ==
Among those who have served as assistant bishops in the diocese were:

- 1930–1935: Rupert Mounsey CR, previously assisted the Bishop of Truro less formally, since 1925; former Bishop of Labuan and Sarawak (1909–1916)
- 1938 – 1949 (d.): John Holden, Vicar of St Budock (until 1944), Canon Residentiary of Truro Cathedral (1944–1947), Archdeacon of Cornwall (from 1947) and former Bishop of Kwangsi-Hunan, of Szechwan, and of Western Szechwan
- 1951 – 1960 (ret.): John Wellington, Vicar of St Germans, Archdeacon of Bodmin (1953–1956) and former Bishop of Shantung
- 1962 – 1973 (ret.): Bill Lash, Vicar of St Clement (from 1963) and former Bishop in Bombay

Honorary assistant bishops — retired bishops taking on occasional duties voluntarily — have included:

- 1949 – 1954 (d.): John Willis, former Bishop of Uganda and Assistant Bishop of Leicester

== Bibliography ==
- Fryde, E. B.; Greenway, D. E.; Porter, S.; Roy, I., eds. (1986). Handbook of British Chronology (3rd, reprinted 2003 ed.). Cambridge: Cambridge University Press. ISBN 0-521-56350-X.
