= George Carey =

Archbishop of Canterbury from 1991 to 2002

The Right Reverend and Right Honourable The Lord Carey of Clifton PC
- Archbishop of Canterbury
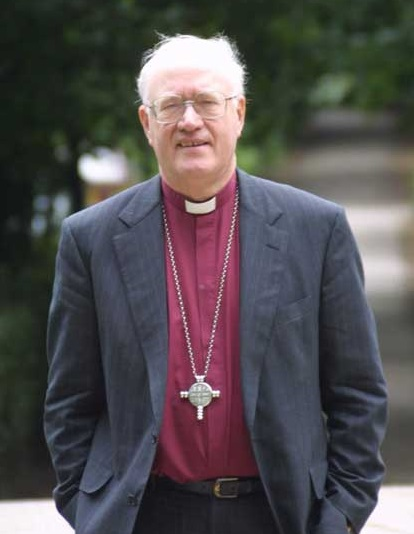
- Carey in 2007
- Church: Church of England
- Province: Canterbury
- Diocese: Canterbury
- In office: 1991–2002
- Predecessor: Robert Runcie
- Successor: Rowan Williams
- Other posts: Honorary assistant bishop in Swansea & Brecon (2004–?), in Southwark and in Bristol; in Oxford (?–2017); Life peer (2002); Primate of All England
- Previous post: Bishop of Bath and Wells (1987–1991)

Orders
- Ordination: 1962 (deacon); 1963 (priest) by Robert Stopford
- Consecration: 3 December 1987 by Robert Runcie

Personal details
- Born: George Leonard Carey; 13 November 1935 (age 90) London, England
- Denomination: Anglican
- Residence: Newbury, Berkshire
- Spouse: Eileen Hood (m. 1960)
- Children: 4
- Occupation: Anglican bishop
- Education: King's College, London (BD); University of London (MTh, PhD)

Member of the House of Lords
- Lord Temporal
- Life peerage 1 November 2002
- Lord Spiritual
- Ex officio as Archbishop of Canterbury; 24 April 1991 – 31 October 2002

George Leonard Carey, Baron Carey of Clifton (born 13 November 1935), is an English retired Anglican bishop who was the Archbishop of Canterbury from 1991 to 2002, having previously been the Bishop of Bath and Wells.

During his time as archbishop the Church of England ordained its first women priests and the debate over attitudes to homosexuality became more prominent, especially at the 1998 Lambeth Conference of Anglican bishops.

In June 2017, Carey resigned from his last formal role in the church after Dame Moira Gibb's independent investigation found he covered up, by failing to pass to police, six out of seven serious sex abuse allegations relating to 17- to 25-year-olds against Bishop Peter Ball a year after Carey became archbishop. The next year the UK Child Sex Abuse Report confirmed Carey had committed serious breaches of duty in wrongly discrediting credible allegations of child sex abuse within the Church and failing to accompany disciplinary action with adding to the church's own safeguarding watchlist. In February 2018 Carey was granted permission to officiate by Steven Croft, the bishop of Oxford, allowing him to preach and preside at churches in the diocese. This was revoked on 17 June 2020 after the church found Carey could have done more to pass to police allegations of beatings by a barrister John Smyth, who drew his victims from schools and evangelical children's camps. Permission was restored to Carey by the Bishop of Oxford seven months later.

== Early life ==
George Carey was born on 13 November 1935 in the East End of London in England. He attended Bonham Road Primary School in Dagenham, then failed his 11-plus. He then attended Bifrons Secondary Modern School in Barking before leaving at the age of 15. He worked for the London Electricity Board as an office boy before starting his National Service at the age of 18 in the Royal Air Force as a wireless operator, during which time he served in Iraq.

== Conversion and ordination ==
Carey became a committed Christian at the age of 17 when he attended a church service with some friends. He said "I had a conversion experience which was very real ... There were no blinding lights, simply a quiet conviction I had found something."

During his National Service, Carey decided to seek ordination and after his discharge he studied intensely, gaining six O-levels and three A-levels in 15 months. He studied at King's College London, graduated as a Bachelor of Divinity from the University of London in 1962 with a 2:1 degree, and was subsequently ordained. He later obtained a Master of Theology and a Ph.D. also from University of London. Carey is the first Archbishop of Canterbury not to have been an Oxbridge graduate since Simon Sudbury died in office in 1381.

== Offices ==
Carey was a curate at St Mary's Islington, worked at Oak Hill Theological College and St John's Theological College, Nottingham and became vicar of St Nicholas' Church, Durham, in 1975. He later wrote a book on his experiences there called The Church in the Market Place.

In 1981, Carey was appointed principal of Trinity College, Bristol. He became Bishop of Bath and Wells in 1987; he was consecrated a bishop by Robert Runcie, Archbishop of Canterbury, at Southwark Cathedral on 3 December 1987 (by which point his election must have been confirmed) and enthroned in February 1988.

When Robert Runcie retired as Archbishop of Canterbury, Prime Minister Margaret Thatcher, encouraged by her former Parliamentary Private Secretary, Michael Alison MP, put Carey's name forward to the Queen for appointment. The religious correspondent for The Times, Clifford Longley, commented that "Mrs Thatcher's known impatience with theological and moral woolliness ... will have been a factor."

Carey was confirmed as Archbishop of Canterbury on 27 March 1991 and enthroned on 19 April 1991.

On 31 October 2002, Carey retired, resigning the See of Canterbury, and the next day was created a life peer as Baron Carey of Clifton, of Clifton in the City and County of Bristol, meaning that he remained a member of the House of Lords, where he sat as a crossbencher. He was succeeded as archbishop by Rowan Williams. Living in the Diocese of Oxford, until 2017 Carey was an honorary assistant bishop as is customary for retired bishops.

Carey was chancellor of the University of Gloucestershire for seven years, resigning in 2010, and was president of the London School of Theology. He is also an Honorary Liveryman of the Worshipful Company of Scriveners and a Distinguished Fellow of the Library of Congress (Washington, DC).

== Handling of Peter Ball and other sex abuse allegations ==
During Carey's term as Archbishop of Canterbury, there were multiple complaints of serial sex abuse made against Peter Ball, the Bishop of Lewes and later of Gloucester until his resignation in 1993 after admitting to an act of gross indecency. Carey wrote to the Director of Public Prosecutions and the Chief Constable of Gloucester police, supporting Ball and saying that he was suffering "excruciating pain and spiritual torment". In October 2015 Ball was sentenced to 32 months imprisonment for misconduct in public office and indecent assault; he admitted the abuse of 18 young men aged 17–25.

Justin Welby, who became Archbishop of Canterbury in 2013, commissioned an independent review by Dame Moira Gibb in February 2016 to deal with the systematic failing of the church in handling Ball's case.

In a statement submitted by Carey to pre-trial hearings regarding Ball, Carey said: "I was worried that if any other allegations were made it would reignite a police investigation. I was told quite categorically that any past indecency matters would not be taken further." Carey said the senior CPS official told him: "As far as we are concerned he has resigned. He is out of it. We are not going to take anything any further." He has repeatedly asserted that he was not trying to influence the outcome of the investigation.

On 22 October 2016, The Daily Telegraph reported that Carey accepted that he deserved criticism over his support of Ball. Carey had requested that his, rather than the church's, lawyers should represent him at the government's Independent Inquiry into Child Sexual Abuse where Carey had been granted "core participation" status, with the Church of England paying for the lawyers.

Gibb's June 2017 report, "An Abuse of Faith", found that Carey was part of a cover-up that shielded Ball from prosecution. The review found that Carey had received seven letters from families and individuals following Ball's arrest in 1992, but passed only one (the least disturbing) to the police. Carey did not add Ball to the Church of England's "Lambeth List" which names clergy about whom questions of suitability for ministry have been raised, but provided Ball with funds and wrote to Ball's twin brother, Bishop Michael Ball, in 1993 saying "I believed him to be basically innocent." Graham Sawyer, who survived abuse by Peter Ball, wants the police to investigate Carey's role in the Ball affair.

Following the production of the "Abuse of Faith" report, with its finding that he had covered up sex abuse allegations against Ball, Carey stated that the report made "deeply uncomfortable reading" and apologised to Ball's victims. Welby asked Carey to step down as an assistant bishop in the Church of England. On 26 June, having spoken to the Bishop of Oxford, Carey resigned from his post as an honorary assistant bishop within the Diocese of Oxford, his last formal role in the church. However, Carey did not resign his orders, nor his seat in the House of Lords.

His resignation automatically revoked his permission to officiate (PTO) (that is, his permission to preach or to minister). He was granted a PTO in the Diocese of Oxford in 2018, conditional on no further concerns coming to light, but this was revoked on 17 June 2020 after new evidence came to light about failures to consider child protection in regard to leading schools' children's activity and Bible camps run by John Smyth in the 1970s. It was then reinstated in January 2021.

On 4 December 2024, Carey submitted his resignation as a priest from the Church of England, writing "I wish to surrender my Permission to Officiate."

In the 2020 BBC documentary about Ball, Exposed: The Church's Darkest Secret, Carey was portrayed in dramatic reconstructions by David Calder.

== Theological and social positions ==
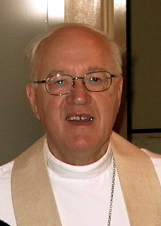
Carey in Memphis, Tennessee, March 2006

Carey's theological roots are in the Evangelical tradition of the Church of England. He strongly supported the ordination of women but also has close ecumenical links with the Roman Catholic Church, being chosen in 1976 to represent the Church of England at a meeting of the Pontifical Council for Promoting Christian Unity in Rome.

Carey is tolerant of divorce and divorced people and the remarriage of divorced people. One of his sons is divorced and he also supported the marriage of the Prince of Wales to Camilla Parker-Bowles, whose first husband is living. He opposed homosexual relationships among members of the clergy, although he admits to having consecrated two bishops whom he suspected of having same-sex partners. He presided over the Lambeth Conference of 1998 and actively supported the conference's resolution which uncompromisingly rejected all homosexual practice as "incompatible with scripture".

Carey was criticised for his lack of neutrality on the issue of homosexuality by those attempting to reach a compromise position which had been presented to the conference by a working group of bishops on human sexuality. Carey also voted against an expressed condemnation (which had been present in the original form of the resolution) of homophobia. The resolution as a whole prompted one of Carey's fellow primates, Richard Holloway, Bishop of Edinburgh and Primus of the Scottish Episcopal Church, to declare "I feel gutted, I feel betrayed, but the struggle will go on."

Carey said: "If this conference is known by what we have said about homosexuality, then we will have failed." The resolution, however, was the beginning of an escalating crisis of unity within the Anglican Communion around the question of human sexuality, a crisis that continues. This resolution is at the heart of current divisions within the Anglican Communion on the issue. In 1999 he was one of four English bishops who expressly declined to sign the Cambridge Accord, an attempt to find agreement on affirming certain human rights of homosexuals, notwithstanding differences within the church on the morality of homosexual behaviour. In an interview with Sir David Frost in 2002 he said: "I don't believe in blessing same-sex relationships because frankly I don't know what I'm blessing."

In 2004, Carey was the first former Archbishop of Canterbury to publish his memoirs. The book, Know the Truth, mentions meetings with the Prince of Wales and Camilla Parker Bowles and his thoughts that they should marry. In 2005, they married in a civil ceremony; the church carried out a blessing after civil marriage at St George's Chapel, Windsor Castle.

In 1998 Carey made a public call for the humane treatment of Augusto Pinochet, the former dictator of Chile, who was at the time in custody in the United Kingdom.

In 2000 Carey was critical of the document Dominus Iesus, issued by the Congregation for the Doctrine of the Faith under Pope John Paul II, saying that it "did not reflect the deep comprehension that has been reached through ecumenical dialogue and cooperation [between Roman Catholics and Anglicans] during the past 30 years ... the Church of England and the worldwide Anglican Communion does not for one moment accept that its orders of ministry and Eucharist are deficient in any way. It believes itself to be a part of the one, holy, catholic and apostolic Church of Christ, in whose name it serves and bears witness, here and round the world."

== Public statements since retirement ==
=== On homosexuality ===
In 1994, Carey voted in the House of Lords to defeat equality legislation that would have lowered the age of consent for homosexual men, from 21 years to the same age as for heterosexuals (16 years). In 1998, he voted against the equalisation of the age of consent, at that time 18, to 16. Since his retirement, Carey has tolerated same-sex partnerships in secular law but continues to oppose same-sex marriage and church blessings of same-sex partnerships. In March 2006, he personally endorsed "with enthusiasm" a questionnaire to American bishops from what he described as "Lay Episcopalians who wish their Church to remain faithful to Orthodox Christianity" in relation to the controversy in that church over the ordination of an openly gay bishop. For this, he was chided by Frank Griswold, the Presiding Bishop of the Episcopal Church in the United States, "for allowing himself to be used by others whose political ambition is to sow division".

In late April 2006, Carey said in a televised interview that the ordination of Bishop Gene Robinson of New Hampshire, US, in 2003 verged on heresy because Robinson is gay and lives in a long-term relationship. His association with Episcopalians Concerned agitated some, and his decision to confirm anti-gay dissidents who refused the ministry of the Bishop of Virginia puzzled the same people. Carey, who remembered the difficulties of the 13th Lambeth Conference that he had presided over in 1998, sought to avoid a major schism in the communion by refraining from further consecrations of gay people.

In April 2010, Carey submitted a witness statement to an appeal court considering the dismissal of a relationship counsellor who had refused to work with homosexuals, in which he suggested that intervention by senior clerics, including himself, was "indicative of a future civil unrest". In the same statement, he suggested that cases engaging religious rights should not be heard by any of the judges who had decided the previous cases, "as they have made clear their lack of knowledge about the Christian faith". His submission was rejected by the Court as "misplaced" and "deeply inimical to the public interest". Carey's position was widely criticised in the press. Andrew Brown, writing in The Guardian, suggested that the effect of the judgment was to say that Carey was "a self-important and alarmist twit who has no idea what he is talking about". The Church Times commented that "One might be forgiven for thinking that Lord Carey of Clifton has generated more column-inches since retiring as Archbishop of Canterbury than he did when in office. His latest foray into the nation's media is more than usually regrettable, as it strikes at the heart of the independence of the judiciary." However, his position was supported by his former colleague, the retired Bishop of Rochester, Michael Nazir-Ali.

In February 2012, speaking at the launch of the advocacy group Coalition for Marriage, Carey voiced his opposition to the government's proposal to legalise same-sex marriage, stating that he was "worried and disappointed" and calling the proposal "cultural vandalism". In March 2013, Carey spoke of being "very suspicious" that behind plans for gay marriage "there lurks an aggressive secularist and relativist approach towards an institution that has glued society". In May 2013, Carey claimed same-sex marriage could set a "dangerous precedent" which could lead to sibling marriage or polygamy. Carey criticised the British government for seeking to change the definition of marriage to "a long-term commitment between two people of any sex, in which gender and procreation are irrelevant".

=== On Muslims ===
As Archbishop of Canterbury, Carey was active in inter-faith work and worked for better relations with Muslims, calling for "deeper dialogue" between the two faiths. On 25 March 2004, after his retirement, he made a speech lamenting the lack of democracy and innovation in Muslim countries, suggesting a lack of critical scholarship toward the Qur'an and saying that moderate Muslims should "resist strongly" the take-over of Islam by extremists. He also criticised the majority of Muslims, who do not support extremists, for not denouncing them. Some viewed his speech as an outspoken attack on Islam; Carey responded: "Those who took the trouble to read my lecture will have noted that I was as critical of the West, of Christianity and, for that matter, also sharply critical of Israel's policy with respect to Palestine."

In September 2006, Carey backed Pope Benedict XVI in the controversy over his comments on Islam and declared that "there will be no significant material and economic progress [in Muslim communities] until the Muslim mind is allowed to challenge the status quo of Muslim conventions and even their most cherished shibboleths".

=== On matters of trade ===
In February 2006, Carey attracted more controversy by declaring in a letter to The Times that a General Synod motion supported by his successor, Rowan Williams, in favour of disinvestment in a company active in the occupied territories of Israel made him ashamed to be an Anglican.

In September 2009, Carey provoked outrage among some Anglicans by making positive remarks about the arms trade. He was quickly condemned by a number of Christian activists, particularly since the Lambeth Conferences in 1988 and 1998 had resolved to oppose the arms trade.

=== On Anglican unity ===
In April 2006, when criticism of his post-retirement activism on a number of fronts had been voiced in an open letter by liberal laypersons in the church, he issued a public statement complaining that such comments were "mischievous and damaging to the Anglican Communion". In an interview for the BBC, on 23 April 2006, he said "I think this is a mischievous letter from Australia and I hope the authors will reflect and repent."

In May 2006, Carey made a speech to the Virginia Theological Seminary, subsequently published on his personal website, which said "When I left office at the end of 2002 I felt the Anglican Communion was in good heart" but that, as a result of subsequent events "it is difficult to say in what way we are now a Communion." This was reported on 11 June 2006 in the Sunday Telegraph and on 12 June 2006 in The Guardian and The Independent as an attack on his successor. An email from Carey on the day of publication was circulated in which he strongly denied this and said "I am hopping mad and will want a retraction from the Sunday Telegraph, otherwise I will lodge a complaint."

In November 2006, Carey was barred from delivering a Church Mission Society lecture at Bangor Cathedral by the Dean of Bangor, who viewed that Carey had become "a factor of disunity and of disloyalty to Rowan Williams, a divisive force."

=== On the British and migration ===
As a founding member of the Cross-Party Group on Balanced Migration, Carey wrote an opinion piece in The Times in September 2008 in which he advocated for a migration policy based on the group's concept of balanced migration (i.e. the number of immigrants entering Britain would have to correspond to the number of emigrants leaving Britain), with this including a cap on the number of migrants allowed to become permanent residents of the United Kingdom; among other statements, he said "If this scale of immigration continues, with people of different faiths, cultures and traditions coming here, what will it mean to be British? [...] Immigration must be kept under control if we are to retain the essentials of British society that have been built up over the generations." The piece was written in response to an earlier one (also published in The Times) by David Aaronovitch, with Aaronovitch's characterisation of the Cross-Party Group as seeking to "chuck [immigrants] out" being rejected by Carey.

In January 2010, Carey gave an interview on BBC Radio 4's Today programme in which he said that while any eventual migration policy should not "give preference to any particular group", the points-based immigration system should give preferences to certain prospective migrants based on their values and backgrounds. While he denied seeking a limit on "people who are non-Christian populations", Carey nevertheless stated that immigrants should have an understanding of British history and culture, with him emphasising the country's Christian heritage as a particular element thereof, and of the country's "commitment to the English language". Around the same time, Carey would appear on BBC Radio 5 Live to call for British migration policy to be debated "without any rancour" and to say that priority should be given to immigrants who were committed to "our values" and that, if this was done, most future immigrants would come from historically Christian countries; he also warned that, if immigration was allowed to continue at its current rate, resentment "could build and is building up already" while "dangerous" social conditions such as disproportionate unemployment among ethnic minorities could also emerge.

=== On ecumenical matters ===
In October 2009, Carey said it was inexcusable that the Vatican gave relatively short notice of its offer to receive some Anglo-Catholics into the Roman Catholic Church within a personal ordinariate, but he nonetheless gave a cautious welcome to the offer.

=== On religious freedom ===
Carey was a leading advocate for the rights of Christians in advance of a case on religious freedom, begun on 4 September 2012 at the European Court of Human Rights, regarding the case of two workers forced out of their jobs over the wearing of crosses as a visible manifestation of their faith.

=== On assisted suicide ===
In July 2014 he announced that he had changed his view on euthanasia in favour of the legalisation of assisted dying for terminally-ill patients.

=== On Syrian Christians ===
On 18 July 2015, he lent his name and efforts to the Barnabas Fund, a charity which aimed to place Syrian Christians, whom ISIS target as part of their Islamic supremacist doctrine, at the front of the UK refugee queue. He called on the government to "welcome Christian refugees and give them priority as asylum seekers. Syrian and Iraqi Christians are being butchered, tortured and enslaved. We need the British Government to work with charities like the Barnabas Fund and others to evacuate those who are in desperate fear of their lives." He was joined by Lord Weidenfeld and the Revd Andrew White, Vicar of Baghdad, as well as many others, in his effort.

== Family ==
Carey married Eileen Harmsworth Hood in 1960. They have two sons, Mark (an Anglican priest) and Andrew (formerly deputy editor of the Church of England Newspaper and later a freelance journalist); and two daughters.

== Select bibliography ==
- 1977: I Believe in Man - a study of Christian anthropology (Hodder & Stoughton)
- 1984: The Church in the Marketplace – on St Nicholas' Church, Durham
- 1986: The Gate of Glory – a study of Christian doctrines of the crucifixion.
- 1989: The Great God Robbery
- 1997: God Incarnate: Meeting the Contemporary Challenges to a Classic Christian Doctrine (Intervarsity) ISBN 9780877845034
- 1998: Canterbury Letters to the Future ISBN 9780854767731
- 1999: Jesus 2000: The Archbishop of Canterbury's Millennium Message (Marshall Pickering) ISBN 9780551032200
- 2004: Know the Truth: A Memoir ISBN 9780007120291
- 2012: We Don't Do God: The marginalisation of public faith with Andrew Carey (Monarch) ISBN 9780857210302

== Honours, awards and legacy ==
In 2011, the George Carey Church of England Primary School in Creekmouth, Barking was opened.

=== Honours ===
- Life peerage (Created 1 November 2002)
- 2002: Royal Victorian Chain (House of Windsor)
- 2009: Knight Grand Cross of the Royal Order of Francis I (House of Bourbon-Two Sicilies)

=== Honorary degrees ===
- 1991: Honorary D.D. degree from the University of Kent (Kent, England)
- 1992: Honorary D.D. degree from the University of Bath (Bath, Somerset, England)
- 1992: Honorary D.D. degree from the University of Nottingham (Nottingham, Nottinghamshire, England)
- 1993: Honorary D.D. degree from Durham University (Durham, County Durham, England)
- 1995: Honorary D.D. degree from The Open University (England)
- 1999: Honorary D.D. degree from The University of the South (Sewanee, Tennessee, USA)
- 1999: Honorary D.D. degree from City University (London)
- 1999: Honorary D.D. degree from the University of Notre Dame (Notre Dame, Indiana, USA)
- 2000: Honorary D.D. degree from the Southern Methodist University (University Park, Texas, USA)
- 2002: Honorary D.D. degree from Wycliffe College (Toronto, Ontario, Canada)
- 2005: Honorary Ph.D degree from the University of Cambodia (Phnom Penh, Cambodia)
- 2006: Honorary D.D. degree from the University of Cambridge (Cambridge, England)

Church of England titles
Preceded by John Bickersteth	Bishop of Bath and Wells; 1987–1991	Succeeded by Jim Thomson
Preceded by Robert Runcie	Archbishop of Canterbury; 1991–2002	Succeeded by Rowan Williams
