= Community of the Glorious Ascension =

The Community of the Glorious Ascension (CGA) is an Anglican monastic community in the United Kingdom, co-founded in 1960 by twin brothers Michael Ball and Peter Ball who both later became bishops. It was founded in Stratford Park in Stroud, Gloucestershire. Until 2012 there was also a small house of sisters at Prasada in Montauroux, in the South of France. This has since been closed and the sisters retired to the mother house in the UK.

In October 2015, Peter Ball was sentenced to 32 months' imprisonment for misconduct in public office and indecent assault after admitting the abuse of 18 young men between 1977 and 1992.

The community currently maintains two separate priories, both at Chillington, South Devon.
