= Bill Ind =

English Anglican bishop (1942–2026)

The Right Reverend Bill Ind
- Bishop of Truro
- Church: Church of England
- Diocese: Diocese of Truro
- In office: 1997 – 30 April 2008
- Predecessor: Michael Ball
- Successor: Tim Thornton
- Other post: Bishop of Grantham (1987–1997)

Orders
- Ordination: 1966 (deacon); 1967 (priest)
- Consecration: c. 1987

Personal details
- Born: 26 March 1942
- Died: 22 April 2026 (aged 84)
- Denomination: Anglican
- Parents: William Robert Ind; Florence Emily Spritey
- Spouse: Frances Isobel Bramald m. 1967
- Children: 3
- Education: University of Leeds

Member of the House of Lords
- Lord Spiritual
- Bishop of Truro; 16 October 2002 – 30 April 2008

William Ind (26 March 1942 – 22 April 2026) was an English Anglican clergyman who served as the bishop of Truro from 1997 to 2008.

== Early life ==
The son of William Robert Ind and Florence Emily Spritey, Ind was educated at the Duke of York's Royal Military School in Dover, at the University of Leeds, where he graduated with a Bachelor of Arts (BA) in history in 1964 and at the College of the Resurrection in Mirfield.

== Career ==
Ind was ordained deacon in 1966 and priest in 1967. From 1966 to 1971, he was curate of Feltham and from 1971 to 1973 of St Mary's Northolt. In 1973, he became team vicar of Basingstoke, in 1979 Vice-principal of the Aston Training Scheme, in 1982 Director of Ordinands of the Winchester Diocese and member of the Doctrine Commission and in 1984 an honorary canon of Winchester, holding all posts until 1987. He was then Suffragan Bishop of Grantham until 1997, when he was appointed the 14th Bishop of Truro. Ind has been married to Frances Isobel Bramald since 1967 and they have three sons. Ind was seen in the BBC series A Seaside Parish and shown visiting Boscastle at the time of the flood there. On 12 May 2007 he announced to the diocesan synod his intention of retiring on 30 April 2008.

In June 2007, Ind was awarded the Trelawny Plate, an award given to people seen as making an "outstanding contribution to Cornish life". During his acceptance of the award, Ind made a speech in which he apologised for the suppression of the 1549 Prayer Book Rebellion, stating that "I am often asked about my attitude to the Prayerbook Rebellion and in my opinion, there is no doubt that the English Government behaved brutally and stupidly and killed many Cornish people. I don't think apologising for something that happened over 500 years ago helps, but I am sorry about what happened and I think it was an enormous mistake."

== Death ==
Ind died on 22 April 2026, at the age of 84.

== Sources ==
- "DodOnline". Archived from the original on 3 October 2006.

Church of England titles
Preceded by Dennis Hawker	Bishop of Grantham; 1987–1997	Succeeded by Alastair Redfern
Preceded by Michael Ball	Bishop of Truro; 1997–2008	Succeeded by Tim Thornton
