= Teresa Cooper =

British activist

Teresa Cooper is a British author, speaker, and children's rights campaigner against family injustice and child abuse.

== Activism ==
Cooper is known for her eighteen-year campaign fighting for the justice and exposure of one of the most horrific abuses against children in Local Authority and Church of England's care. She was one of the girls drugged, sexually abused and imprisoned in a small room for over 163 days while in care at the Kendall House children's home in Gravesend, Kent, in the 1970s and 1980s. The Kendall House records indicate daily administration of drugs in overdose form, both orally and by intra-muscular injections; sexual infections while incarcerated in the small room inside Kendall House, a large extensive list of psychotropic drugs and drugs for Parkinson's disease—all administered by force. Cooper's Kendall House records also include placebo and tests including urine, blood samples and swabs. Cooper relates that the girls she was with in the home have now had children of their own with birth defects, and that these defects are a direct result of being drugged while at Kendall House.

The story was first revisited in a national newspaper by Adrian Butler of the Sunday Mirror in January 2009.

The story has been covered by Sally Gillen in 2007 reporter at Communitycare Magazine, Review by Liz Davies is senior lecturer children and families social work, at London Metropolitan University and blog by Sally Gillen.

Cooper first took her case to Parliament with her then-MP Neil Gerrard in 1994.

Cooper has since received a "substantial out of court settlement" in regard to her civil case against the Church of England.

== Bibliography ==
- Trust No One (2007)

== See also ==
- Anglican Communion sexual abuse cases
