= Charles Stubbs =

English clergyman (1845–1912)

The Right Reverend Charles William Stubbs
- Bishop of Truro
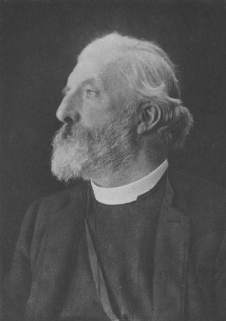
- Church: Church of England
- Diocese: Diocese of Truro
- In office: 1906–1912 (death)
- Predecessor: John Gott
- Successor: Winfrid Burrows
- Other post: Dean of Ely (1893–1905)

Personal details
- Born: 3 September 1845 Liverpool
- Died: 4 May 1912 (aged 66) Truro
- Denomination: Anglican
- Education: Liverpool Collegiate Institution
- Alma mater: Sidney Sussex College, Cambridge

Charles William Stubbs DD (3 September 1845 – 4 May 1912) was an English clergyman.

He was born in Liverpool and educated at the Liverpool Collegiate Institution and Sidney Sussex College, Cambridge. As a clergyman he held several incumbencies, among them rector at Wavertree and Granborough. He took a great interest in the working classes and in social subjects, and was liberal both in his political and in his theological opinions. He was Dean of Ely from 1894 to 1906 when he was appointed the fourth Bishop of Truro.

His daughter Meriel married the organist and composer Thomas Tertius Noble.

== Quotations ==
- "To sit alone with my conscience will be judgment enough for me."

== Selected works ==
- God and the People: the religious creed of a democrat, being selections from the writings of Joseph Mazzini; 2nd ed. 1896; G W E Russell, A Pocketful of Sixpences, London 1907, p 92
- Co-operation & Owenite Socialist Communities/The Land and the Labourers (1884)
- The Land and the Labourers (1893)
- Charles Kingsley and the Christian Social Movement (1899)
- Social Teachings of the Lord's Prayer (1900)
- In a Minster Garden: A Causerie (1902)
- Castles in the Air. And Other Poems Old and New. (Dent, 1903)
- The Christ of English Poetry (1906)
- Cambridge and its Story (1912)
- Hymns, including Christ was born on Christmas Night and Carol of King Cnut

Church of England titles
Preceded by Charles Merivale	Dean of Ely; 1893–1905	Succeeded by Alexander Kirkpatrick
Preceded by John Gott	Bishop of Truro; 1906–1912	Succeeded by Winfrid Burrows
