= Moira Gibb =

British public servant and social worker (born 1950)

Dame Moira Gibb DBE
- Born: Moira Margaret Bogan; April 1950 (age 76); Scotland, United Kingdom
- Education: University of Glasgow; University of Edinburgh; Newcastle University
- Occupations: Public servant; Social worker
- Spouses: Brian Gibb (m. 1970, ended); Henry Blythe (m. 1990)
- Children: 1

Dame Moira Margaret Gibb DBE (née Bogan; born April 1950) is a British public servant and social work adviser. After qualifying as a social worker, she worked for the London boroughs of Ealing, Kensington and Chelsea, and Camden, where she served as the chief executive of Camden London Borough Council from 2003 to 2011. Gibb served as a Civil Service commissioner from 2012 to 2016, and chaired the boards of City Lit and Skills for Care until 2022. She led a serious case review into safeguarding at Southbank International School, and into the Church of England's response to the case of Peter Ball.

== Early life and education ==
Moira Margaret Bogan was born in April 1950 in Scotland to James Bogan and Catherine Bogan (née McTaggart). She studied engineering for two years at the University of Glasgow before changing course and studying English, French and psychology, graduating with an undergraduate Master of Arts degree. She later studied at the University of Edinburgh, graduating with a Certificate of Qualification in Social Work, and gained a Post Qualification Certificate in Child Care at Newcastle University.

== Career ==
On graduation, Gibb became a teacher at a secondary modern school in Newham, East London. She then qualified as a social worker, working in the neighbourhood of Scotswood in Newcastle upon Tyne. She rose through the profession to become deputy director of social services in Kensington and Chelsea in 1988, and then became director in 1990. In 2003, Gibb was appointed the chief executive of Camden London Borough Council, in which post she remained until 2011.

=== Other work ===
Gibb served as a non-executive director of the boards of NHS England and the UK Statistics Authority, and was the chair of Skills for Care from 2014 to 2022.

Gibb was a member of the council of Reading University from 2013 to 2016, and served as a Civil Service commissioner from 2012 to 2016 and a director of the London Marathon from 2005 to 2011. She was also the chair of governors of the adult-education college City Lit from 2013 to 2022.

=== Reviews ===
From 2014, Gibb chaired a serious case review into safeguarding at Southbank International School following the William Vahey case. The report was delivered in 2016, and concluded that "positive steps have already been taken" but that there was "still much to be done".

Gibb chaired the Church of England independent review (announced in February 2016) into the case of Peter Ball, a former bishop of Gloucester who was imprisoned in 2015 for sexual abuse. Gibb's report was published in June 2017 and concluded: "Ball's priority was to protect and promote himself and he maligned the abused. The Church colluded with that rather than seeking to help those he had harmed, or assuring itself of the safety of others." The report resulted in George Carey being asked to step down as an honorary assistant bishop by Justin Welby, the archbishop of Canterbury.

== Personal life ==
In 1970, Gibb married the British diplomat Brian Graham Gibb, and later married Henry Blythe in 1990. She has one son.

== Honours ==
Gibb was made a Commander of the Order of the British Empire (CBE) in the 2002 New Year Honours for services to the social services. In the 2012 New Year Honours, she was promoted to Dame Commander of the Order of the British Empire (DBE) for services to local government and social work. Gibb was awarded honorary doctorates by the University of East Anglia in 2012 and Kingston University in 2013.
