= Alan Smithson =

Bishop of Jarrow from 1990 to 2001

- Bishop of Jarrow
- Diocese: Diocese of Durham
- In office: 1990–2001
- Predecessor: Michael Ball
- Successor: John Pritchard
- Other posts: Honorary assistant bishop in Glasgow & Galloway (2002–2010) and in Edinburgh (2007–2010)

Orders
- Ordination: 1964 (deacon); 1965 (priest)
- Consecration: 1990

Personal details
- Born: 1 December 1936 Bradford, West Riding of Yorkshire, United Kingdom
- Died: 17 June 2010 (aged 73) Edinburgh, UK
- Denomination: Anglican
- Parents: Herbert & Mary
- Spouse: Jean McKenzie (m. 1964)
- Children: 2 sons; 2 daughters
- Education: Queen's College, Oxford

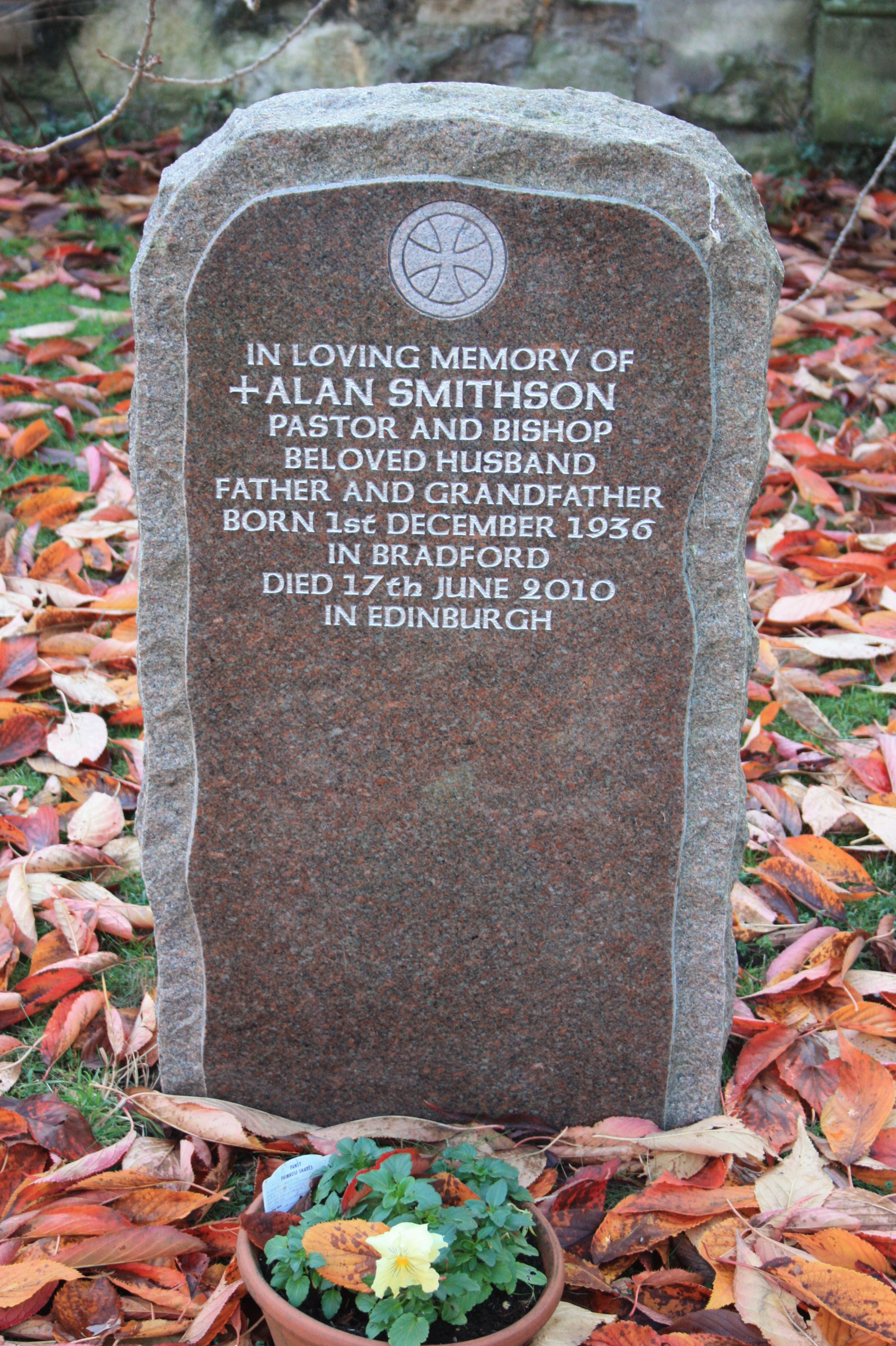
Smithson's grave, St Mark's, Portobello

Alan Smithson (1 December 1936 – 17 June 2010) was Bishop of Jarrow from 1990 to 2001.

He was educated at Bradford Grammar School and Queen's College, Oxford (he gained an Oxford Master of Arts and a Diploma in Theology before embarking on an ecclesiastical career with a curacy at Christ Church, Skipton after which he was Chaplain at his old college. Following this he was Vicar of Bracknell and later a Canon Residentiary at Carlisle Cathedral before being appointed to the episcopate. In retirement he served the Diocese of Edinburgh as an assistant bishop. He was also National Chaplain to the Church Lads' and Church Girls' Brigade from 1992 to 2006 where he was much loved.

He died in Edinburgh and is buried in the churchyard of St Mark's in Portobello, just to the rear of the church.

== Controversy ==
In 1998, he contributed to the defence in a court case where the accused was Michael Golightly, a priest on a charge of attempted murder against his wife Enid. Enid was subjected to an attack with a hammer to the side of her head whilst asleep, and was left for some hours by Golightly with a severe brain injury. There was no evidence of forced entry and Golightly did not call an ambulance until late in the afternoon.

Before the trial, Smithson had succeeded in getting bail for the accused, who stayed with friars at Alnmouth. During the trial he stated that the accused was an upstanding clergyman and it was not in his nature to carry out such an act; his submission was opposed by Enid Golightly's family. The victim refused to give evidence for the prosecution. Michael Golightly was sentenced to five years' imprisonment for causing grievous bodily harm with intent.

After the trial, Enid Golightly lived in Durham, disabled and in poverty, until Michael was released. Re-united, they subsequently moved to the Hull area.

Church of England titles
| Preceded by Michael Ball | Bishop of Jarrow; 1990–2001 | Succeeded by John Pritchard |
