= John Gott (bishop) =

Third Bishop of Truro

The Right Reverend John Gott
- Bishop of Truro
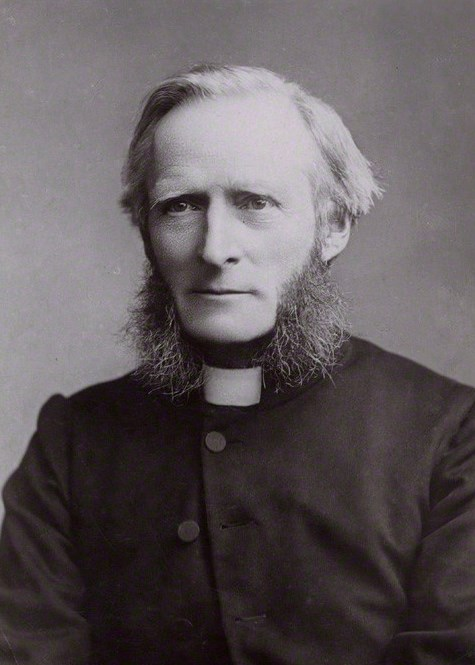
- Diocese: Diocese of Truro
- In office: 1891–1906 (death)
- Predecessor: George Wilkinson
- Successor: Charles Stubbs
- Other post: Dean of Worcester (1885–1891)

Personal details
- Born: 25 December 1830 Leeds, England
- Died: 21 July 1906 (aged 75) Trenython, Cornwall, England
- Buried: Tywardreath, Cornwall
- Denomination: Anglican
- Spouse: Harriot Mary Maitland (m.1868)
- Education: Winchester College; Brasenose College, Oxford

John Gott (25 December 1830 – 21 July 1906) was the third Bishop of Truro from 1891 until his death in 1906.

== Life ==
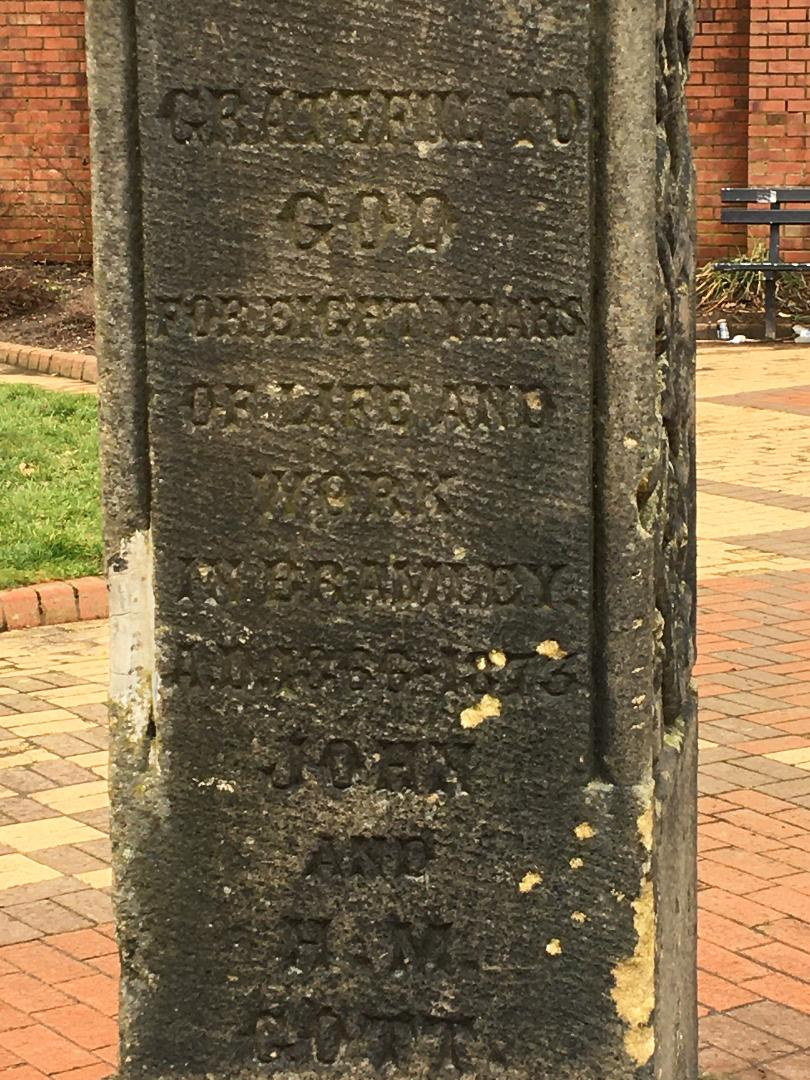
Bramley Cross dedication by John Gott and H. M. Gott 1873

Gott was born in Leeds on Christmas Day 1830, the third son of William Gott, a wool merchant. He was educated at Winchester and Brasenose College, Oxford. He then embarked on an ecclesiastical career with a curacy at Great Yarmouth, after which he held incumbencies at Bramley, Leeds, 1871–76, and at Leeds Parish Church, where he also founded the Leeds Clergy School. His last post, before his ordination to the episcopate, was as Dean of Worcester from 1886. In 1873, Gott erected a stone cross in Bramley to celebrate 8 years living and working in Leeds (see photograph). He was one of the founders (1876) and a president of the private Leeds Girls' High School.

In 1891, Gott succeeded to the see of Truro on the resignation of George Howard Wilkinson. His election to that See was confirmed at St Mary-le-Bow on 28 September and he was consecrated a bishop at St Paul's Cathedral on 29 September 1891, by Edward Benson, Archbishop of Canterbury. He saw in 1903 the completion of Truro Cathedral; founded a bishop's clergy fund for the aid of clergy in time of ill-health or other necessity; and diligently visited all parts of his diocese. A strong believer in nurturing the spirituality of all women, Gott preached a sermon in 1892 for the anniversary of the Girls' Friendly Society. A high churchman, but not a strong partisan, he signed in January 1901 the bishops' letter inviting clergy to accept the positions defined in the Lambeth 'Opinions.'

He died suddenly at his residence, Trenython, near Par, on 21 July 1906 and was buried at Tywardreath.

== Family ==
Gott married in 1868 Harriot Mary Maitland of Loughton Hall, Essex; she died in London on 19 April 1906; they had one son and three daughters.

== Works ==
- The Parish Priest of the Town (1887)

== Sources ==
- Lock, Julian. "Gott, John (1830–1906)". Oxford Dictionary of National Biography (online ed.). Oxford University Press. doi:10.1093/ref:odnb/33485. (Subscription, Wikipedia Library access or UK public library membership required.)

Religious titles
Preceded by Lord Alwyne Compton	Dean of Worcester; 1885–1891	Succeeded by Robert Forrest
Preceded by George Wilkinson	Bishop of Truro; 1891–1906	Succeeded by Charles Stubbs
