= Peter Ball (bishop) =

British Church of England bishop and convicted sex offender

The Right Reverend Peter Ball
- Bishop of Gloucester
- Diocese: Diocese of Gloucester
- In office: 1992–1993
- Predecessor: John Yates
- Successor: David Bentley
- Other posts: Bishop of Lewes (1977–1992); Area bishop: 1984–1992

Orders
- Ordination: 1956 (deacon); 1957 (priest)
- Consecration: 1977

Personal details
- Born: 14 February 1932
- Died: 21 June 2019 (aged 87)
- Denomination: Anglican
- Occupation: Bishop, monk
- Education: Queens' College, Cambridge
- Criminal information
- Status: Released on licence in February 2017
- Convictions: 8 September 2015 (guilty plea)
- Criminal charges: Misconduct in public office, indecent assault
- Penalty: 32 months in prison

Peter Ball (14 February 1932 – 21 June 2019) was a British bishop in the Church of England and convicted sex offender. In 1960 he and his twin brother (Michael Ball) established a monastic community, the Community of the Glorious Ascension, through which Ball came into contact with many boys and young men.

He was the suffragan Bishop of Lewes from 1977 to 1992 and the diocesan Bishop of Gloucester from 1992 to 1993, when he resigned after being cautioned for sexual abuse; he continued to officiate at several churches after that.

In October 2015, Ball was sentenced to 32 months' imprisonment for misconduct in public office and indecent assault after admitting the abuse of 18 young men over a period of 15 years from 1977 to 1992. Further charges of indecently assaulting two boys, aged 13 and 15, were allowed to lie on file in a contentious decision by the Crown Prosecution Service (CPS). He was released on licence in February 2017 and died two years later.

== Early life ==
Ball was born on 14 February 1932. He was educated at Lancing College, a public school in Lancing, West Sussex. He then studied at Queens' College, Cambridge, and graduated with a Bachelor of Arts (BA) degree in 1954; as per convention, his BA was promoted to a Master of Arts (MA) degree in 1958. He entered Wells Theological College in 1954 and received two years of training in preparation for ordination.

== Ordained ministry ==
Ball was ordained in the Church of England, made a deacon on Trinity Sunday 1956 (27 May) and ordained a priest the Trinity following (16 June 1957), both times by George Bell, Bishop of Chichester, at Chichester Cathedral. He began his ministry as a curate in Rottingdean in Brighton. He then received basic monastic training at Kelham Theological College. In 1960 he and his identical twin brother, Michael, founded a monastic community, the Community of the Glorious Ascension (CGA), of which he was prior until his ordination to the episcopate. This brought many young boys who were novice monks into his care over the years. Whilst prior of CGA, he combined his duties as a member of a religious order with several other pastoral roles, including three years as vicar of the Church of the Holy Angels, Hoar Cross, in Staffordshire.

=== Bishop of Lewes ===
Ball was suffragan Bishop of Lewes from 1977 to 1992. He was ordained a bishop on 18 October 1977, by Donald Coggan, Archbishop of Canterbury, at St Paul's Cathedral.

Official inquiries into prolonged failure to prevent child abuse in the Diocese of Chichester, of which Lewes is part, brought up allegations against Ball, of which he was later convicted.

=== Bishop of Gloucester, police caution and resignation ===
Having been translated to the see of Gloucester in 1992, Ball resigned from his position as Bishop of Gloucester in 1993 after admitting to an act of gross indecency with a 19-year-old man and accepting a formal police caution for it. In 1993, Crown Prosecution Service (CPS) lawyers said that "sufficient admissible, substantial and reliable evidence" existed that Ball had committed indecent assault and gross indecency. At the time, the Director of Public Prosecutions, Barbara Mills, decided not to prosecute Ball though the CPS in 2015 said it believed that prosecution in 1993 would have been in the public interest.

At Ball's trial in 2015, it was stated that a member of the royal family, a Lord Justice of Appeal, JPs, Cabinet ministers and public school headmasters—"many dozens" of people—had campaigned to support him in 1993. There were a further 2,000 letters of support. The Reverend Graham Sawyer, an abuse victim, wanted a full investigation and blamed corrupt elements in the British establishment. Sawyer believed that the establishment was still too strong and its links with the church should be investigated. Phil Johnson, who claims Ball abused him when he was 13 years old, said it looked like a deal was done between the Church of England, the Director of Public Prosecutions and the CPS, and said, "I think there was great effort made to avoid bad publicity and to avoid the embarrassment of trying a bishop in public."

David Greenwood, a solicitor acting for some victims, said that "With more power comes the ability to work in a culture where you feel that you can get away with it. It seems Peter Ball has been able to do that." Keith Porteous Wood, the executive director of the National Secular Society (NSS), believes this was an orchestrated campaign. Wood wanted to find out who was behind the alleged campaign and also wanted to see copies of relevant letters examined and a comprehensive list obtained of callers and writers, particularly of high profile and influential campaigners. There has been a call for the Goddard Inquiry to look into why Ball was not prosecuted in 1993.

== Retirement ==
After his resignation, Ball was given accommodation at Manor Lodge, Aller, Somerset, on the Duchy of Cornwall estate of Charles, Prince of Wales. George Carey, who was then Archbishop of Canterbury, allowed Ball to continue officiating as a priest after his resignation, but not as a bishop – he could still celebrate the Eucharist, but not ordain clergy or confirm. He was granted permission to officiate in the Diocese of Bath and Wells from 2001 to 2010. Peter Hancock, the Bishop of Bath and Wells, was critical of Ball being allowed to serve in the Langport area after his retirement.

== Trial and conviction for sexual abuse ==
In 2007, Peter Halliday, a choirmaster in Guildford in Surrey, who had told the church that he had abused children in the 1990s but was allowed to continue working with children, was convicted of three counts of sexual abuse of children and police were concerned that there had been many more cases.

In light of this event and the public airing of the church's bad handling of Halliday, as well as two other high profile sexual abuse convictions, the House of Bishops decided in May 2007 to ask the Central Safeguarding Liaison Group to hold a review of past cases throughout the Church of England, which was carried out starting in 2008. The Diocese of Chichester and the Sussex Police also began investigating long-standing allegations of sexual abuse in East Sussex.

In 2008, Colin Pritchard, a vicar in Bexhill-on-Sea, was convicted of sexually abusing two boys; The Guardian described it as the "breakthrough case" for dealing with sexual abuse in the diocese. Roy Cotton, a priest in the Chichester diocese died in 2006 but allegations of abuse by him emerged shortly thereafter. In 2018, Pritchard, who had by then changed his name to Ifor Whittaker, was convicted of further sexual abuse that was carried out in collaboration with Cotton.

In 2010, the past cases review was published.

In 2011, the Diocese of Chichester asked Baroness Butler-Sloss to conduct an independent review of the way the Pritchard and Cotton cases were handled by the Chichester diocese; the report was published in 2012, and was severely criticized when it was released. In 2014 Phil Johnson, who by that time was a member of the National Safeguarding Panel for the Church of England, and who had been abused by Cotton and Pritchard and had given testimony to Baroness Butler-Sloss during her 2011 inquiry, made it public that he had told her about abuse by Ball and that she had chosen to omit that from her report. In May 2012, the review and historic files about Ball were given to the Sussex Police.

Ann Lawrence from the Minister and Clergy Sexual Abuse Survivors organisation described the opening of the police investigation as "a major first step" for the Church of England. Abuse victim Neil Todd, who later died by suicide, said that:

It is an investigation which to be honest is well overdue. It [the abuse] stayed with me throughout my life's journey and even this far down the track it doesn't feel like there's any real closure. The abuse was varied. The worst of it was mental abuse. Obviously there was a component of sexual abuse. But basically it was mind games and controlling behaviour. ... When it came to the abuse, the abuse was sexual, mental and physical. He was just not a very nice human being.

After the police investigation of the 20-year-old matters, Ball and another priest, Vickery House, were arrested in November 2012. Ball was released the same day on medical advice, to be interviewed by police at a later date for questioning about offences "allegedly committed against eight boys and young men, all of whom were at [the] time in their late teens or early twenties, except one who was 12."

Three days later, police announced that a further seven people had come forward with allegations of abuse by Ball.

On 27 March 2014, Jaswant Narwal, the Chief Crown Prosecutor for the Crown Prosecution Service South East, announced that based on review of evidence gathered by Sussex Police, they would seek to prosecute Ball on three charges relating to the time when he served as a bishop:

- Misconduct in public office between 1977 and 1992
- Indecent assault on a boy, aged 12 or 13, in 1978
- Indecent assault on a man, aged 19 or 20, between 1980 and 1982

On 8 September 2015, Ball pleaded guilty to two counts of indecent assault and one of misconduct in a public office. His trial began on 5 October 2015. Two charges of indecently assaulting two boys in their early teens, perhaps the most serious alleged offences, were allowed to lie on file in a deal with CPS lawyers. Keith Porteous Wood sees this as yet another example of the law enforcement system repeatedly treating Ball leniently.

I urge the prosecuting authorities to reconsider their decision and if appropriate charge him for all credible allegations using the same offences as they would for any ordinary member of the public. This includes "indecent assaults on two other teenage boys, one in Eastbourne in the late 1970s and one in Litlington in the early 1980s. (Keith Porteous Wood)

Bobbie Cheema, QC, said for the prosecution:

[Ball] was highly regarded as a godly man who had a special affinity with young people. The truth was that he used those 15 years in the position of bishop to identify, groom and exploit sensitive and vulnerable young men who came within his orbit. For him, religion was a cloak behind which he hid in order to satisfy his sexual interest in those who trusted him.

At the Old Bailey on 7 October, Mr Justice Wilkie sentenced Ball to 32 months in prison. He was eligible for parole after 18 months, and served under a month for each victim. The late Neil Todd's partner, Marc Hawley, said:

two years and eight months – for 15 years of sexual exploitation, abuse and grooming of young men who came into his orbit while he was the bishop of Lewes. I am more than glad that Peter Ball now resides at Her Majesty's pleasure even though the sentence is far too lenient for the gravity of his activities.

Many victims have claimed severe lasting harm and Civil Court action against the Diocese of Chichester was lodged in October 2015. A Church of England priest said that when he was a teenager Ball had tried to make him have sex considered an "act of commitment" as a condition of being ordained. There are allegations of serious corruption and cover-ups within the Church of England regarding Ball's abuse.

The Archbishop of Canterbury, Justin Welby, ordered an independent review of the way the Church of England dealt with Ball's case, but the Minister and Clergy Sexual Abuse Survivors group and Keith Porteous Wood were unsure if the investigation would be sufficiently far-reaching. Wood accused a former Archbishop of Canterbury, George Carey, of encouraging the cover-up and Carey has been quoted stating:

I was worried that if any other allegations of past indecency were made it [criminal action against Ball] would reignite. I wanted some reassurance that this would not be the case. ... I was so troubled, that evening after dinner I went to my study. ... I was supplied with a number of a man at the CPS I believed to be a director. I do not recall his name. ... I rang him and asked what might happen if allegations from the past were made. ... I was told quite categorically that the other allegations would not be taken further as far as we are concerned.

Wood commended Justin Welby, Archbishop of Canterbury, for initiating the inquiry. The Guardian's crime correspondent, Sandra Laville, also wrote that Carey knew of the cover-up. Ruth Gledhill, writing in Christian Today, said that Carey intervened personally over the matter. Carey insists he only contacted the CPS after Ball had been cautioned. Abuse survivor Graham Sawyer, who alleges decades of pressure from the Church of England to silence him, believes that the church should no longer police itself. The Church of England reported in 2015 that the operation leading to Ball's arrest was a direct result of concerns raised by the church to the police in 2012:

[The investigation] began as a direct result of the safeguarding officer at Lambeth Palace raising concerns about Peter Ball following a church initiated review of files. The approach to the police was a proactive step on the part of the national Church leading to a self-initiated referral via CEOP (Child Exploitation and Online Protection centre) to Sussex Police in 2012. This led to active co-working between Lambeth Palace, the Diocese of Chichester and Sussex Police on a complex enquiry with full information sharing. We pay tribute to those detectives whose work on this case over the past three years has led to this conviction and sentencing.

The review ordered by Welby produced its report, An Abuse of Faith, on 22 June 2017, which found that senior figures in the Church of England had colluded over twenty years with Ball—Welby said it made harrowing reading, adding "The church colluded and concealed rather than seeking to help those who were brave enough to come forward. This is inexcusable and shocking behaviour".

A former vicar, Vickery House, was convicted in October 2015 and was sentenced to serve 6½ years in prison for sex assaults against men and a boy. House worked in the same diocese as Ball. House and Ball collaborated running a "Give a Year For Christ" scheme and both men abused three of the same victims during the scheme. If Ball had not pleaded guilty both men would have been tried together. There was a long delay between the first complaints to the police over House and a proper police investigation.

Ball was released from prison on licence in February 2017, after having served half of his sentence.

== After the trial ==
On 16 December 2015, the BBC published a report on the Ball affair. Cliff James had told the BBC that he informed a cleric in 1992 about abuse he had suffered. James alleges three bishops later telephoned his contact urging her to discourage him and another stated victim from going to the police or to the media. Thirteen different bishops allegedly took no action after a person in the church raised concerns. Ball's housekeeper and gardener, Christine and Michael Moss, said that bishops ignored their concerns over Ball. Moss said, "What upsets me so much is the Church did nothing." BBC reporter Colin Campbell stated that during 20 years three different police forces tried to access information the Church of England held about Ball but investigations started only in 2012. Martin Warner, Bishop of Chichester, said he would call the above a cover up and, "in terms of our practice today, that would immediately be the trigger for disciplinary action."

On 23 February 2016, the BBC published information about documents they discovered suggesting Ball's defence team tried during the 1990s to negotiate with the police and avoid a public trial. Ball promised to resign as bishop, leave Britain and retire to a French convent. Ball, however, stayed active as a priest until 2010 and remained in the United Kingdom.

It looks like there was a deeply sinister, coordinated, but probably in the end rather inept attempt at a cover-up. (Graham Sawyer, abuse survivor and vicar who waived his right to anonymity)

The Church of England confirmed that Ball stood in for his twin brother, Bishop Michael Ball, at services and official duties on several occasions in the 1990s. Michael Ball has said that those attending such occasions had been informed of the substitution, but the report An Abuse of Faith (sections 4.3.5-4.3.8) found cases where those attending were not informed, adding "we have received no evidence to corroborate the assertion that anyone was ever advised that Peter Ball was attending an event in the place of his brother".

=== Reviews ===
In early 2016, it was announced that Dame Moira Gibb would chair a review into how the allegations against Ball were handled and why there was so little credence given to his victims, also whether the Church of England complied with its statutory duties. The review had been criticised because, among other reasons, it would take place behind closed doors and lack what was considered necessary transparency, and because it did not "specifically include the questionable role played by the Church in bringing undue influence to bear on the administration of justice concerning Ball's abuse".

I believe that the Church of England review should add bullying and silencing of victims and whistleblowers to the terms of reference and I shall be making this clear to Dame Moira before agreeing to take part. (Graham Sawyer, a vicar and abuse survivor speaking in Feb 2016)

Sawyer stated in April 2016 that he was refusing to co-operate with the review because alleged bullying by high-ranking current church office holders would not be investigated. Terry Sanderson of the National Secular Society said:

The institutional bullying and silencing almost succeeded in preventing Bishop Ball ever being brought to justice. The Church's obdurate refusal at the highest levels to specify them [bullying and silencing] in the Terms of Reference should ring alarm bells about the seriousness of its intentions to look at them with the requisite priority. Maintaining the refusal means the principal witness Graham Sawyer, and perhaps others, will not give evidence and this further undermines the validity of the Review. At least he will be able to give his evidence to the Independent (Goddard) Inquiry set up by the Government.

Gibb published her report in June 2017.

The remit of the Independent Inquiry into Child Sexual Abuse includes investigation of the Church of England, and specifically of the Ball case and other cases in the Diocese of Chichester.

==== 2017 review ====
An independent review in 2017 found that the church's hierarchy, notably Lord Carey of Clifton, a former Archbishop of Canterbury, colluded in concealing abuse by Ball over a 20-year period. Archbishop Carey had seven letters from individuals and relatives after Ball was cautioned by police in 1992, but passed only one (of least concern) on to the police. Carey did not put Ball on the "Lambeth List" of clergy whose suitability for the ministry is questioned. Concealing abuse was given higher priority than helping victims. The review stated that "The church appears to have been most interested in protecting itself." It also said that "progress [towards dealing satisfactorily with claims of abuse in the Church of England] has been slow and continuing, faster improvement is still required". Archbishop Welby of Canterbury said that the church "colluded and concealed" instead of trying to help "those brave enough to come forward", and asked Lord Carey of Clifton to step down from his role assisting the Bishop of Oxford. Rowan Williams was also criticised. Abuse survivor Graham Sawyer said the church treated him and others with contempt. He said, "The church continues to use highly aggressive legal firms to bully, frighten and discredit victims ... In my own case, I continue to endure cruel and sadistic treatment by the very highest levels of the church." Sawyer wanted the police to investigate Carey's part in the Ball case.

==== Proposed conversion to Roman Catholicism ====
It was reported in 2017, after his release from prison, that Ball and his twin brother were seeking to join the Roman Catholic Church, in order to "live and worship in anonymity and without constant fear".

== Independent Inquiry into Child Sexual Abuse ==
The IICSA was investigating the Peter Ball case in 2018, and asked Prince Charles (later King Charles III) and his principal private secretary to give witness statements about Ball, for a hearing starting on 23 July 2018. Charles, who had been in correspondence with Ball, indicated his willingness to assist.

William Chapman, a barrister representing some of the survivors, said, "The story of Peter Ball is the story of the establishment at work in modern times. It is the story of how the establishment minimised the nature of Peter Ball's misdeeds … and silenced and harassed those who tried to complain.... [Ball had the] willing assistance of members of the establishment. It included the heir to the throne, the archbishop and a senior member of the judiciary, to name only the most prominent....The alacrity and the extent of the response by Peter Ball's friends to one of their own in trouble was impressive. It makes a horrible contrast to the way Peter Ball's victims were treated....These establishment helpers claim they were duped by Peter Ball … But you will have to consider if it is credible, given what they must have known or could easily have found out about Peter Ball, whether they were really as ignorant as they claimed they were about the nature of Peter Ball's activities. Some claimed they did not know what a caution meant. Well, Prince Charles has many advisers; he only had to ask. So does the archbishop of Canterbury." Chapman added that Ball's friends worked against the criminal process. "They went far beyond the normal obligations of friendship."

Richard Scorer, a lawyer representing other abuse survivors, said that Lord Carey of Clifton, a former Archbishop of Canterbury, bears the greatest responsibility, and called on him to give a "transparent account of his actions". He also said, "If a charlatan with an insatiable appetite for abuse wanted to secure a continuous supply of vulnerable young victims, there was no better way of achieving this than by founding a religious order not subject to any external supervision, and by making his victims' participation in the abuse a religious duty obligated by their oath of absolute obedience. Not for the first time, theology and religious ritual provided the ideal mask for abuse, with the evil of what Peter Ball did being compounded by his nauseating claim that the abuse was spiritually uplifting. Most of all, however, Peter Ball found in his fellow bishops in the Church of England the perfect accomplices, prepared to turn a blind eye to his abuse over many decades, to collude in the lie that the abuse of Neil Todd was an uncharacteristic aberration, to cast doubt on his guilt, to smear his victims, and to rehabilitate him."

Fiona Scolding, senior counsel, described a scheme by Ball that enabled him to groom young men for sexual abuse. The men were incited to pray naked, and practise massage and spanking.

== Death ==
Peter Ball died aged 87, at home in Langport on 21 June 2019, from injuries sustained in a fall at home.

== In popular media ==
In January 2020, the BBC broadcast Exposed: The Church's Darkest Secret, a two-part story of the individuals who brought Ball to justice and the cover-up that reached to the highest levels of the Church of England. Donald Sumpter portrayed Ball in dramatised scenes for that documentary.

== Selected works ==
- Ball, Peter (1986). "Exploring the depths: why pray?". In Mayne, Michael (ed.). Encounters: exploring Christian faith. London: Darton, Longman & Todd. pp. 65–74. ISBN 0-232-51669-3.

== See also ==
- Anglican Communion sexual abuse cases
- List of serial rapists
