= Michael Ball (bishop) =

Anglican bishop (born 1932)

The Right Reverend Michael Ball
- Bishop of Truro
- Diocese: Truro
- In office: 1990–1997
- Predecessor: Peter Mumford
- Successor: Bill Ind
- Other posts: Bishop of Jarrow; 1980–1990

Orders
- Ordination: 1971 (deacon); 1971 (priest)
- Consecration: 1980

Personal details
- Born: 14 February 1932 (age 94)
- Denomination: Anglican
- Parents: Thomas Ball; Kathleen Bradley
- Profession: Bishop, schoolmaster
- Education: Queens' College, Cambridge

Michael Thomas Ball (born 14 February 1932) is a retired Anglican bishop and the co-founder of the Community of the Glorious Ascension. He was the Bishop of Truro from 1990 to 1997.

== Early life ==
Ball was born on 14 February 1932. He was educated at Lancing College and Queens' College, Cambridge.

== Career ==
Ball's first teaching post in 1955 was in general science at Pocklington School, East Yorkshire, where he was also house tutor at Lyndhurst, the junior boarding house. He left in 1960 to found the community mentioned below, following training at a separate community known as the Society of the Sacred Mission at Kelham Hall, near Newark, Nottinghamshire. He was a teacher of biology and chemistry at Marling School in Stroud, Gloucestershire and was then head of the lower school until 1975. He was chaplain of Sussex University 1976 to 1980, suffragan Bishop of Jarrow from 1980 to 1990 and then the 13th Bishop of Truro. He was the first bishop there to ordain women.

In 1960, Ball founded a monastic community at Stratford Park in Stroud, along with his identical twin brother Peter Ball. Peter Ball later became suffragan Bishop of Lewes (1977–1992) and then Bishop of Gloucester (1992–1993). Peter Ball was later convicted and imprisoned for sex offences.

Ball is the author of Foolish Risks of God, a Lenten study course on the parables of the New Testament (Mowbray Lent Book, ISBN 0-8264-6395-9) published in 2002. In the book's introduction he writes of the parables,

The deepest problems of the universe are hidden in their simplicity, whether it be free will and choice, reward and punishment, or justice and mercy, power and powerlessness, and in most cases Jesus has complete confidence in our ability to understand their significance for ourselves, despite what the Gospel writers and preachers ever since have tried to do with them. They are not commandments for behaviour, though they may gently persuade; neither are they black and white morsels of theology. They are signposts to God and guides to living and loving.

Ball was one of four bishops who failed to respond to reports of sexual abuse by a prominent member of Truro diocese, according to a 2018 case review commissioned by the diocese. The diocese had failed to investigate the accusations against Jeremy Dowling, a lay reader and synod member, who rose to influential positions including being a diocesan communications officer. Dowling was jailed in 2015 for seven years, and again in 2016 for a further eight years, for a series of indecent assaults on boys while teaching at a Cornwall school during the 1960s and '70s. The review found that "There is no doubt that there were a number of missed opportunities for the diocese of Truro to undertake its own investigations into the allegations made in 1972 against Jeremy Dowling." Kim Stevenson, a criminal justice expert said that the report made "sadly familiar reading" and she contrasted the situation in Britain with that in Australia where those who concealed or did not act on evidence of a sexual offence faced prosecution.

== Personal life ==
In retirement, Ball and his twin brother Peter, a former Bishop of Lewes and of Gloucester, lived together in rural Somerset until Peter Ball was convicted of sex offences. Peter Ball died at his home in 2019.

Church of England titles
Preceded by Alexander Hamilton	Bishop of Jarrow; 1980–1990	Succeeded by Alan Smithson
Preceded by Peter Mumford	Bishop of Truro; 1990–1997	Succeeded by Bill Ind
