= Stratford Park =

Green flag-awarded area of Stroud in Gloucestershire, southwest England

Coordinates: 51.7518°N 2.2261°W

Stratford Park is a green flag awarded area of Stroud, Gloucestershire, south west England. With a large park and lake, and a leisure centre complex including a 50m spring-fed lido, Stratford Park is a major tourist area for Stroud. It is located on the outskirts of Stroud town centre near Paganhill and Whiteshill.

== History ==
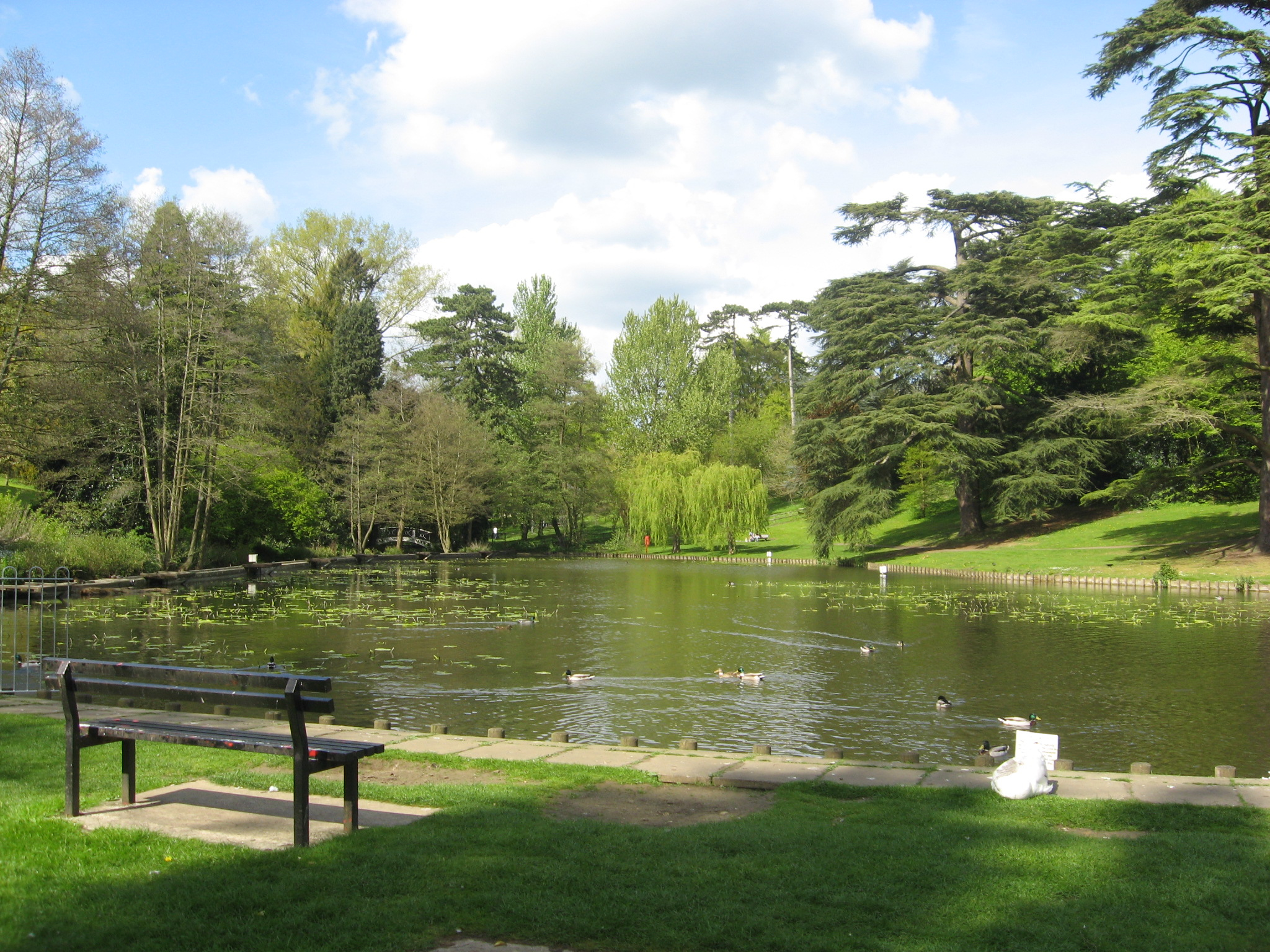
Stratford Park lake

Edward Stratford was the last member of the historic Stratford family to own the piece of land which had been recorded as part of Stroud since 1307. He sold it to a Stroud mercer called Nathaniel Gardner in 1653 after the civil war, and the house still has a stone with the initials C.G.1674 for his son Giles Gardner. Joseph Watts, a Stroud brewer who died in 1855, owned the house from 1819. However, his grandson Joseph Watts Hallewell J.P., D.L., M.A., focused his interests of the extensive grounds, and changed the estate's name from Stratford House to Stratford Park – hosting the 1870 Gloucestershire Agricultural Show. The first Stroud Flower Show appears to have taken place the following year on Thursday 17 August 1871, and appears to have continued on an annual basis with the last being on 19 August 1875.

Joseph Watts Hallewell died at Stratford Park on 24 February 1891, and was buried at Pitchcombe. The Park was sold by the executors to George Holloway MP by an auction conducted by Bruton Knowles at £10,800. George Holloway died the following year and it appears that the house was then occupied by his brother-in-law John Cotterel Strudwick.

Following the death of then owner G.F. Ormerod in June 1935, his executors, following his wishes and sold the 56 acres (230,000 m^{2}) to Stroud Urban District Council to ensure that the people of Stroud could access and enjoy the parkland permanently. In 1936 the outdoor swimming pool and the Stratford Park bowling green, were opened, both of which are still in use today.

More recently the park received national attention in August 1989 when Stroud District Council arranged for security workers and tree-fellers to attend at midnight to remove thirteen trees they felt stood in the way of a road-widening scheme. However local people heard of the 'secret' operation and were there to protect the trees first. After a stand-off that lasted till dawn the police called off the operation on grounds of public safety. The following year the first 'traffic calming' scheme in Gloucestershire was introduced without the need to harm any of the trees. In the following three years Gloucestershire County Council figures showed accident rates on the affected stretch of road had been halved. The trees remain to this day.

== Today ==
The Leisure Centre building was opened on Sunday 1 June 1975 within the grounds of the park to provide a new range of leisure provisions for the people of Stroud. The leisure centre offers facilities including a gym, 25 metre indoor swimming pool with viewing area, a 50-metre spring-fed outdoor pool (with rare, Grade II listed 10m cast-in-situ curved concrete 3-level diving board), trampolining, two sports halls, outdoor astroturf all-weather pitch, hard court tennis courts, and a bowls pitch. There are also squash courts and badminton courts. Social events are also held at the leisure centre.

The traditional park includes a Victorian bandstand which hosts band concerts during the summer, and there is plenty of space for dog walking and other leisure activities. There is a lake which is often used for angling competitions. It contains many fish, ducks and swans. There is a 6-inch (150 mm) scale model railway track skirting the lake.

In 2026, Stratford Park Lido was slated for indefinite closure but a successful community campaign reversed the decision and the pool remained open.

== Museum in the Park ==
The park also features Museum in the Park, a museum of local history and culture which opened in 2001. The museum is the successor to the Cowle Museum, which opened in 1930, which became the Stroud District (Cowle) Museum in 1983. Admission is free. Schools frequently use some of the activities and resources it has to offer.
