= Indecent assault =

Offence of aggravated assault

Indecent assault is an offence of aggravated assault in some common law-based jurisdictions. It is characterised as a sex crime and has significant overlap with offences referred to as sexual assault.

== England and Wales ==
Indecent assault was a broadly defined offence under sections 14 and 15 of the Sexual Offences Act 1956. It was replaced, with prospective effect only, by sexual assault under section 3 of the Sexual Offences Act 2003. A range of acts toward the more severe among those in its actus reus augmented other offences, including rape (section 1).

Prosecutions can proceed under sections 14 and 15 of the 1956 act for offences committed before the new law came into force.

The mens rea and actus reus of the crime are similar to that for common law assault and/or battery, but with an additional element of "indecent circumstances". These were present if a "reasonable person" would believe the act indecent, whatever the belief of the accused.

== Australia ==
In New South Wales, the offence of indecent assault is punishable under Section 61L of the Crimes Act 1900.

The mens rea and actus reus are the same for the common law offence of assault, the only distinction being that the act committed must have a sexual connotation.

== India ==
In India it is punishable under section 354 of the Indian Penal Code. The accused may be punished up to two years' imprisonment and/or a fine.

== New Zealand ==
In New Zealand, indecent assault is an offence under section 135 of the Crimes Act 1961. It is punishable by up to seven years' imprisonment.

The offence consists of an assault that has an indecent character, as judged by community standards. The actus reus and mens rea are the same as for common assault, with the added requirement that the conduct would be regarded as indecent by right-thinking members of the community.

As with common assault, consent is a defence. The prosecution is not required to prove a lack of consent unless the defence raises it as an issue. Additionally, a genuinely held belief in consent is a defence, even if the belief was unreasonable. This differs from the offence of sexual violation, where the belief in consent must be both honestly and reasonably held.

== See also ==
- Groping
- Sexual harassment
