= List of headmasters of the Royal Grammar School, Guildford =

This is a comprehensive list of Headmasters of the Royal Grammar School, Guildford since 1554. There have been 35 headmasters since the granting of the royal charter, which established the post of headmaster:

- 1554 – 1555 ? Lawson
- 1555 – 1556 Thomas Baker
- 1556 – 1569 Thomas Jervard
- 1569 – 1575 Roger Goad
- 1575 – 1580 Francis Taylor
- 1580 – c.1584 John Stanford
- c.1584 – 1589 Thomas Parvish
- 1589 – 1594 John Good
- 1594 – 1603 John Crow
- 1603 – 1623 James Bladworth
- 1623 – 1633 William Hill
- 1633 – 1645 George Holmes
- 1645 – 1698 John Graille
- 1698 – 1718 Samuel Pigot
- 1718 – 1722 John Randal
- 1722 – 1733 George Stevens
- 1733 – 1756 Cornelius Jeale
- 1756 – 1769 John Pearsall
- 1769 – 1804 Samuel Cole
- 1804 – 1819 William Hodgson Cole
- 1819 – 1822 John Stedman
- 1822 – 1837 Henry Ayling
- 1837 – 1852 Joseph Belin
- 1852 – 1859 Frederick James Fairhead
- 1859 – 1874 Henry Gordon Merriman
- 1874 – 1879 Charles Henry Jeaffreson
- 1879 Edward J. Piggott (temporary appointment)
- 1879 – 1889 Sidney Bolton Kincaid
- 1889 – 1919 John Charles Honeybourne
- 1919 – 1942 Arthur John Bradford Green
- 1942 – 1967 Michael Duncan Hallowes
- 1967 – 1975 Wilfred Harry Hore
- 1975 – 1992 John Daniel
- 1992 – 2007 Timothy Mark Stuart Young
- 2007–present Jonathan Mark Cox

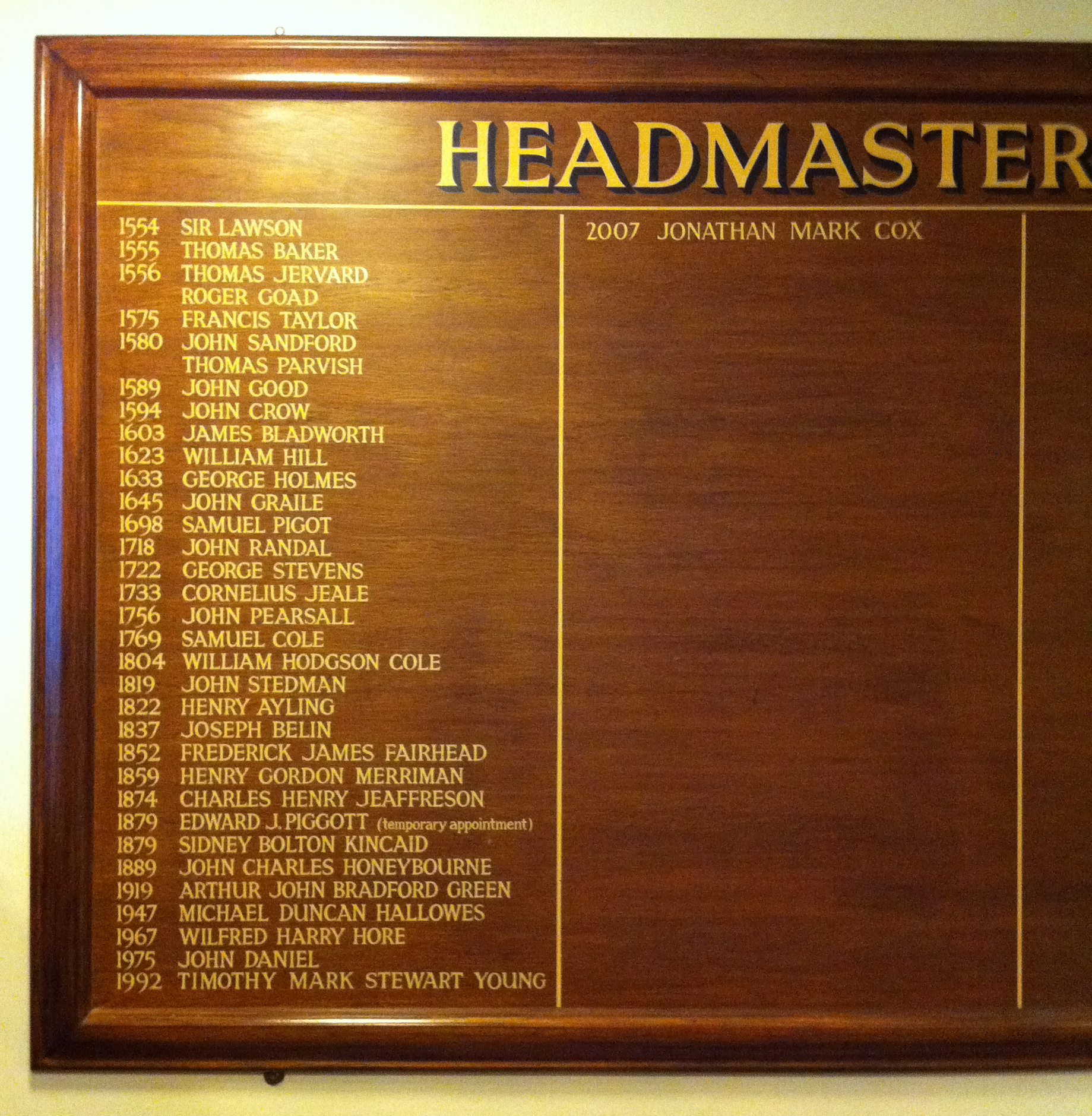
Photograph of the board showing the headmasters of the Royal Grammar School, Guildford.

== See also ==
- Edward VI
- List of Old Guildfordians (Royal Grammar School, Guildford)
- Royal Grammar School, Guildford
- Royal Charter
