= Execution of Cicely Ormes =

1558 burning of Protestant woman

Coordinates: 52.63180°N 1.30961°E

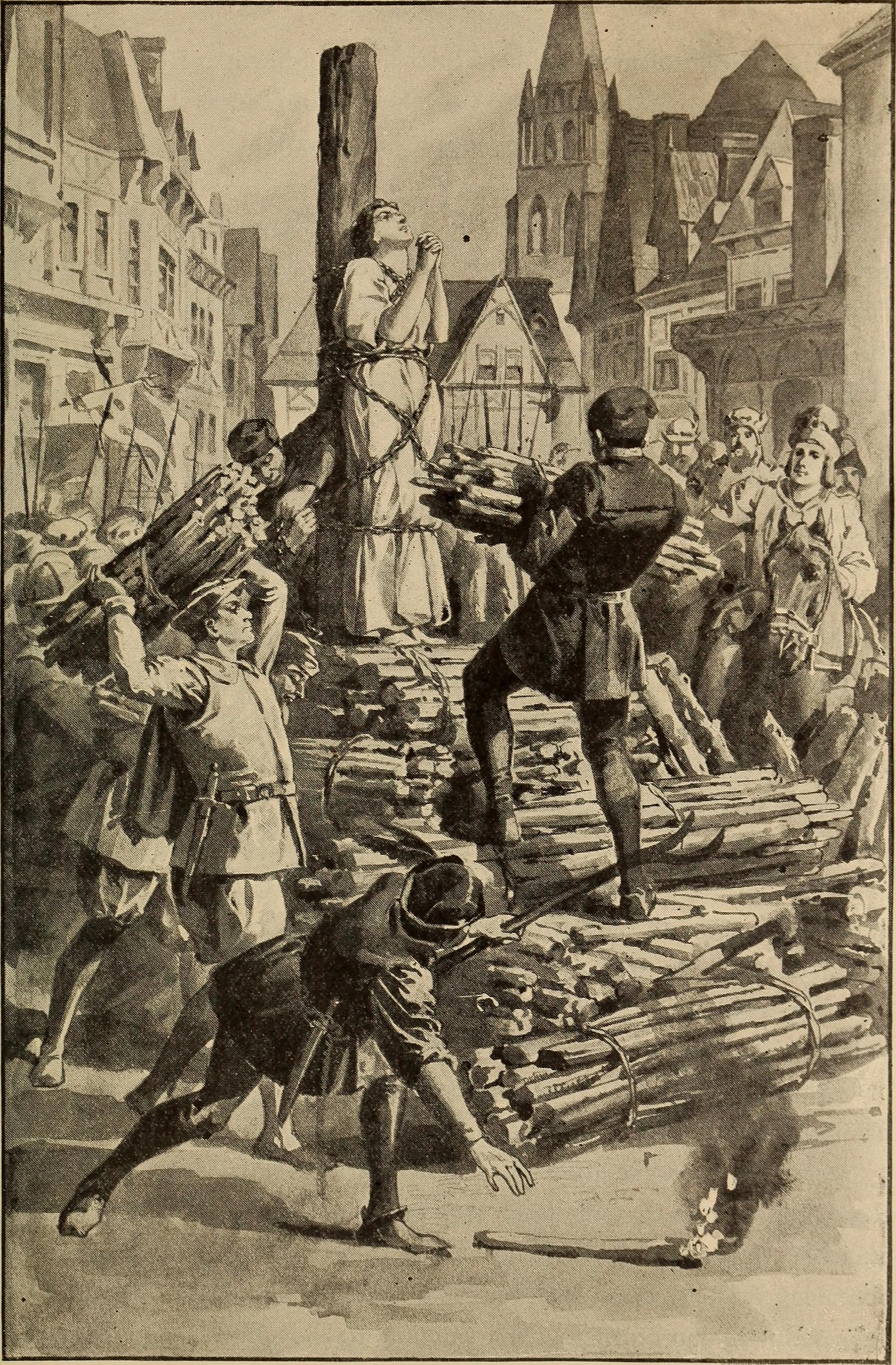
A depiction of Ormes's execution by burning, in Foxe's Book of Martyrs.

The execution of Cicely Ormes took place in September 1558 at Lollard's Pit in Norwich, England. Ormes, a Protestant, was accused of heresy after she showed public support of Elizabeth Cooper and Simon Miller, two other Protestants accused of the same crime, during their own executions. Notably, Ormes was offered the possibility of staying quiet about her beliefs in return for her life, which she refused. She was sentenced to death under laws against heresy instituted by the third Parliament of Mary I, and as such was a victim of the Marian persecution. Ormes was the second of only two residents of Norwich to be burned at the stake as part of this persecution, the other being Cooper. The story of her execution is told in Foxe's Book of Martyrs.

== Background ==
Following the creation of a Protestant church in England under Edward VI, his Catholic successor Mary I made attempts to quickly reverse the English Reformation. This included the passing of legislation during her third Parliament to criminalise heresy against the Catholic Church under punishment of death.

Much of the available information about Ormes is recorded in Foxe's Book of Martyrs. According to Foxe, Ormes lived in the Norwich parish of St Lawrence, being married to worsted weaver Edward Ormes. The Book of Martyrs does not detail how Ormes found and embraced Protestantism, only recounting her self-incrimination, arrest, examination, and execution. Ormes had previously recanted her Protestant beliefs, and there is no surviving evidence that documents her rejection of Protestantism prior to the events that led to her execution.

=== Executions of Elizabeth Cooper and Simon Miller ===
Ormes attended the execution at the stake of Elizabeth Cooper, who was accused of being a Protestant heretic, and Simon Miller, a man from King's Lynn, at Lollards Pit (TG 2406 0892) in Norwich, in July 1557. Here, Ormes declared her support for Cooper and Miller, shouting that "she would pledge them of the same cup they drank on." This was noticed by former city official and Catholic religious conservative John Corbet from Sprowston, who was attending the execution. Corbet had, over a decade prior in 1545 as a justice, arrested one Dorothy Bale in an attempt to put her to death. He seized Ormes and took her to the Norwich diocesan chancellor, Michael Dunning.

== Execution ==
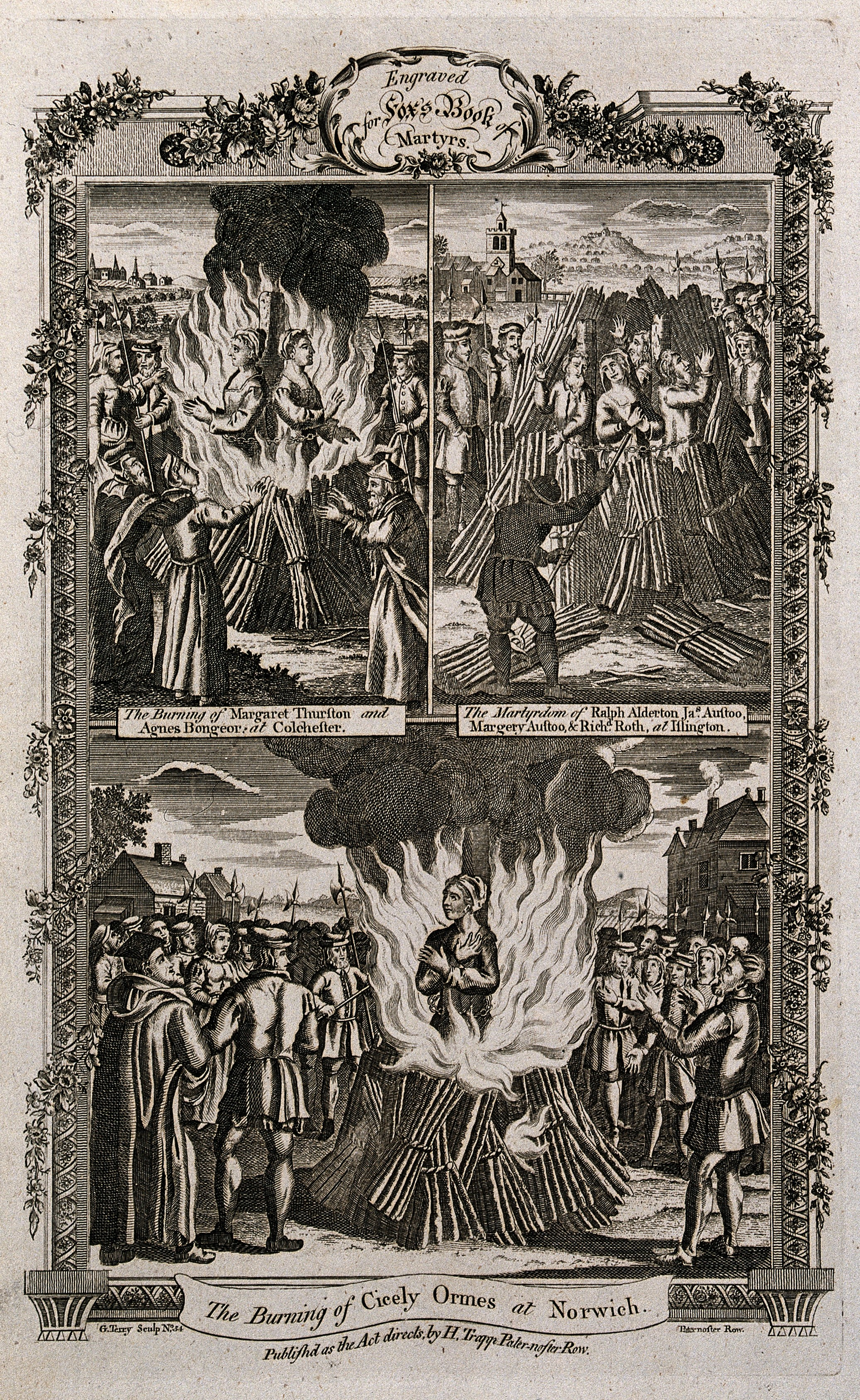
An engraving for the Book of Martyrs, depicting Ormes's execution (bottom)

Dunning questioned Ormes several times about her views, though was met with the steadfastness of Ormes's beliefs. These included questions on her views about transubstantiation. Following this, he sent her to the Bishop's prison though called her back not long after. When Dunning offered her conditional freedom, telling her that "if she would go to church and keep her tongue, she should be at liberty to believe as she would," giving her the possibility of outwardly conforming while keeping her beliefs to herself, Ormes declined this and said that "God would surely plague her" if she accepted this deal. Dunning wrote that he had shown "more favor to her than ever he did to any, and that he was loath to condemn her considering that she was an ignorant, unlearned, and foolish woman", before condemning her to death. Ormes had a letter written to Dunning about a change of heart, but was not given the opportunity to deliver it to him nor discuss its contents with him.

Ormes was turned over to the Norwich city sheriffs who transported her to the Guildhall prison in the city, where she waited for her execution. On a late September morning in 1558, after rejecting papal authority and declaring her Protestant faith to a crowd of about 200 people who had assembled at Lollards Pit in Norwich for her execution, Ormes was executed between 7 and 8 o'clock. Foxe wrote that she "died as one feelyng no payne".
