= John Shepreve =

English classical scholar and Hebraist

John Shepreve (or Shepery) (1509?–1542) was an English classical scholar and Hebraist.

== Life ==
Born at Sugworth, in the parish of Radley, Berkshire (now Oxfordshire), about 1509, he was admitted a probationer fellow of Corpus Christi College, Oxford, in 1528, graduated B.A. on 3 December 1529, and M.A. in 1533. He was Greek reader in his college, and was appointed Hebrew professor of the university about 1538, in succession to Robert Wakefeld. In April 1542 he obtained permission from the university to expound in the public schools the Book of Genesis in the Hebrew language, 'provided that he lectured in a pious and catholic manner.' He died at Agmondesham, Buckinghamshire, in July 1542. When his death became known at Oxford many learned men composed Greek and Latin verses to his memory, and pasted them on the doors of St. Mary's Church. These verses, together with some of Shepreve's own compositions, were collected with a view to their publication, under the editorship of George Etheridge, but they never appeared in print. Several authors, including John Leland and Dr. John White, celebrated his memory in their books of poems. William Shepreve was his nephew.

== Works ==
He was the author of:

- 'Summa et Synopsis Novi Testamenti distichis ducentis sexagmta comprehensa,' published by John Parkhurst at Strasburg about 1556; reprinted London, 1560, Oxford, 1586, the last edition being revised by Laurence Humfrey. The verses are also reprinted in 'Gemma Fabri,' London, 1598. They were composed for the purpose of giving mnemonics to students of divinity.
- 'Hippolytus Ovidianae Phaedrae respondens,' published at Oxford about 1584 by George Etheridge, a physician who had been one of Shepreve's pupils. The original manuscript was preserved in the library of Corpus Christi, Oxford.
- 'Vita et Epicedion Johannis Claymondi Praesidis Coll. Corp. Chr.,' manuscript in the library of the college. This poem is the main authority for John Claymond's life.
- 'S. Basilius, Episc. Caesariensis. In Esaiam Prophetam commentariorum tomus prior,' translated into Latin from the original Greek.
- 'Oratio in laudem Henrici VIII,' manuscript in the Royal Library, Brit. Mus. 16 A 2. In the same volume there are two orations by Shepreve, in Hebrew, on the same subject.
- 'Carmen de Christi Corpore.'

He is also credited with a translation into Latin of the Hecuba of Euripides, a translation into English of Seneca's Hercules Furens, and a translation into Hebrew of the Epistle of James and the Epistle of Jude.

== Notes ==
Attribution

This article incorporates text from a publication now in the public domain: "Shepreve, John". Dictionary of National Biography. London: Smith, Elder & Co. 1885–1900.
