= Execution of Elizabeth Cooper =

1557 burning of Protestant woman

Coordinates: 52.63180°N 1.30961°E

The execution of Elizabeth Cooper took place on 13 July 1557 at Lollards Pit in Norwich, England. Cooper, a Protestant, was accused of heresy. She was sentenced to death under laws against heresy instituted by the third Parliament of Mary I, and as such was a victim of the Marian persecution. Cooper was the first of only two residents of Norwich to be burned at the stake as part of this persecution, the other being Cicely Ormes who had spoken out during Cooper's execution. Cooper's story is covered in Foxe's Book of Martyrs.

== Background ==
Following the creation of a Protestant church in England under Edward VI, his Catholic successor Mary I made attempts to quickly reverse the English Reformation. This included the passing of legislation during her third Parliament to criminalise heresy against the Catholic Church under punishment of death.

Cooper was the wife of a pewterer. It is not clear how she first encountered or embraced Protestantism. She appears to have initially recanted her Protestant beliefs, though this it not clear; she may have not publicly renounced her faith and instead have considered a conformity to the new laws against Protestantism as a rejection of her faith.

One day in 1557, Cooper went into St Andrew's Church, interrupting a service to publicly repudiate her recantation, which had also happened "in that place". She stated that her actions had caused her to be "greatly troubled inwardly", that she was "heartily sorry" for them, and that they should not "take her doings before for an example". She then left the church, and returned to her home.

Following her announcement, a member of the congregation only referred to as "one Bacon," and thus not definitely identifiable, demanded that Thomas Sotherton, the Sheriff of Norwich and a parishioner of St Andrew's, take her into custody, exclaiming, "Master sheriff! Will you suffer this?" It appears that she was only arrested as a result of this demand. Sotherton came to Cooper's house; she came down to the door when he knocked, and he placed her under arrest before turning her over to the local ecclesiastical authorities. Shortly after her arrest, Cooper was condemned to death by the chancellor of Norwich diocese Michael Dunning.

== Execution ==
Cooper's execution, on 13 July 1557 at Lollards Pit (TG 2406 0892), took place alongside that of Simon Miller of King's Lynn, a fellow Protestant who had been betrayed to the authorities after asking a group of people leaving a church "where he might go to have the communion," indicating a desire to attend a Protestant service.

The execution was attended by one Cicely Ormes. Ormes declared her support for Cooper and Miller, shouting that "she would pledge them of the same cup they drank on." This was noticed by former city official and Catholic religious conservative John Corbet from Sprowston, who seized Ormes and took her to the Norwich diocesan chancellor, Michael Dunning. Ormes would later be executed herself in September 1558 after nearly a year's imprisonment.
