= John Parkhurst =

English bishop and scholar

The Right Reverend John Parkhurst
- Bishop of Norwich
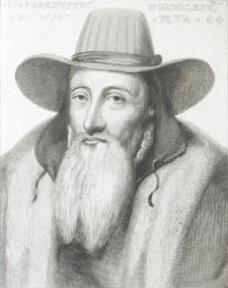
- Church: Church of England
- Diocese: Diocese of Norwich
- Elected: 13 April 1560
- Installed: September 1560
- Term ended: 2 February 1575 (death)
- Predecessor: John Hopton
- Successor: Edmund Freke
- Other post: Chaplain to the Queen

Orders
- Ordination: 1532
- Consecration: 1 September 1560 by Matthew Parker

Personal details
- Born: c. 1512 Guildford, Surrey
- Died: 2 February 1575 Norwich, Norfolk
- Buried: Norwich Cathedral
- Denomination: Anglican
- Parents: George Parkhurst
- Spouse: Margaret Garnish
- Occupation: previously Latin scholar
- Education: Merton College, Oxford

John Parkhurst (c. 1512 – 2 February 1575) was an English Marian exile and from 1560 the Bishop of Norwich.

== Early life ==
Born about 1512, he was son of George Parkhurst of Guildford, Surrey. He initially attended the Royal Grammar School, Guildford, before at an early age moving to Magdalen College School at Oxford. Subsequently, he joined Merton College, where he was admitted to a fellowship in 1529 after graduating B.A. (24 July 1528). He was an adept in the composition of Latin epigrams. He took holy orders in 1532, and proceeded M.A. 19 February 1533. While he was acting as tutor at Merton, John Jewel was his pupil and they remained friends through life.

== Priestly career ==
When, in 1543, Henry VIII and Queen Katherine Parr visited Oxford, Parkhurst wrote Latin verses in their honour and became chaplain to the Queen. He was already chaplain to Charles Brandon, 1st Duke of Suffolk, and to his wife Katherine, and his friends included Miles Coverdale and John Aylmer. Soon afterwards he was appointed rector of Pimperne, Dorset, and in 1549 was presented by Thomas Seymour, 1st Baron Seymour of Sudeley to the living of Cleeve Episcopi, Gloucestershire. Jewel and other Oxford scholars often visited him there; when Jewel gave humanity lectures at Corpus Christi College, Oxford, Parkhurst went over to hear him, and declared in a Latin epigram that he was metamorphosed from a tutor into a pupil.

On the accession of Queen Mary I he left the country and settled at Zurich, where he was received by Rudolf Gwalther, Heinrich Bullinger and other Calvinists. Returning on the accession of Elizabeth I, on 13 April 1560 he was elected Bishop of Norwich, and was consecrated and installed in September following. He was created D.D. at Oxford in 1566.

== Episcopal career ==
In the see of Norwich, at the time of Parkhurst's appointment, many of the livings were without incumbents. He did nothing to discourage 'prophesyings' in his diocese, and took measures against Catholics. Defrauded by a servant, Parkhurst moved from the bishop's palace, which he had repaired, to a small house at Ludham; and introduced a bill into parliament to prevent such abuses, which was accepted by the government. He died on 2 February 1575, aged 63, and was buried in the nave of his cathedral on the south side. Elegies by Rodolph Gualter and his son were published at Zürich in 1576, in a tract dedicated to Edwin Sandys, Bishop of London. Parkhurst married Margaret, daughter of Thomas Garnish or Garneys of Kenton, Suffolk, but left no issue.

== Works ==
Parkhurst published in the year before his death a collection of Latin epigrams which he had composed in his youth, and which had been prepared for publication at Zurich in 1558; the majority are eulogies or epitaphs on friends. Verses by Thomas Wilson, Alexander Nowell, Bartholomew Traheron, Lawrence Humphrey, and others, are prefixed. A few are translated in Timothy Kendall's Flowres of Epigrammes, 1577. He contributed to the collection of Epigrammata in mortem duorum fratrum Suffolcensium Caroli et Henrici Brandon, London, 1552, and to John Sheepreeve's Summa ... Novi Testamenti disticis ducentis sexaginta comprehensa, Strasburg, 1556. The translation of the Apocrypha in the Bishops' Bible of 1572 is also ascribed to him. John Bale dedicated to him, in a eulogistic address, his Reliques of Rome in 1563.

== Notes ==
Church of England titles
Preceded by John Hopton	Bishop of Norwich; 1560–1575	Succeeded by Edmund Freke
