= Lollards Pit =

Where Lollards were burned at the stake for heresy, Norwich, England

Coordinates: 52.63180°N 1.30961°E

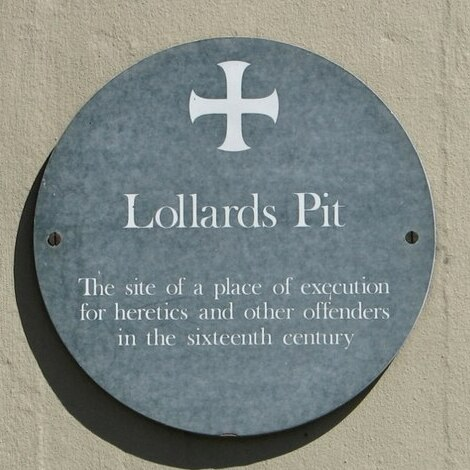
A plaque at Lollards Pit

Lollards Pit (TG 2406 0892), located just outside the old boundary of the English city of Norwich, England, was the place where Lollards, and later a number of Marian martyrs, were burned at the stake for heresy. The condemned would be led across Bishop Bridge—and thus outside of the nearby old city boundary—to be executed.

== Executions ==
Ian Lolworth was said to be the first to be executed at the site. As a result of a heresy trial that took place during Thomas Bilney's last preaching tour in Norfolk, Bilney was burned at Lollards Pit on 19 August 1531.

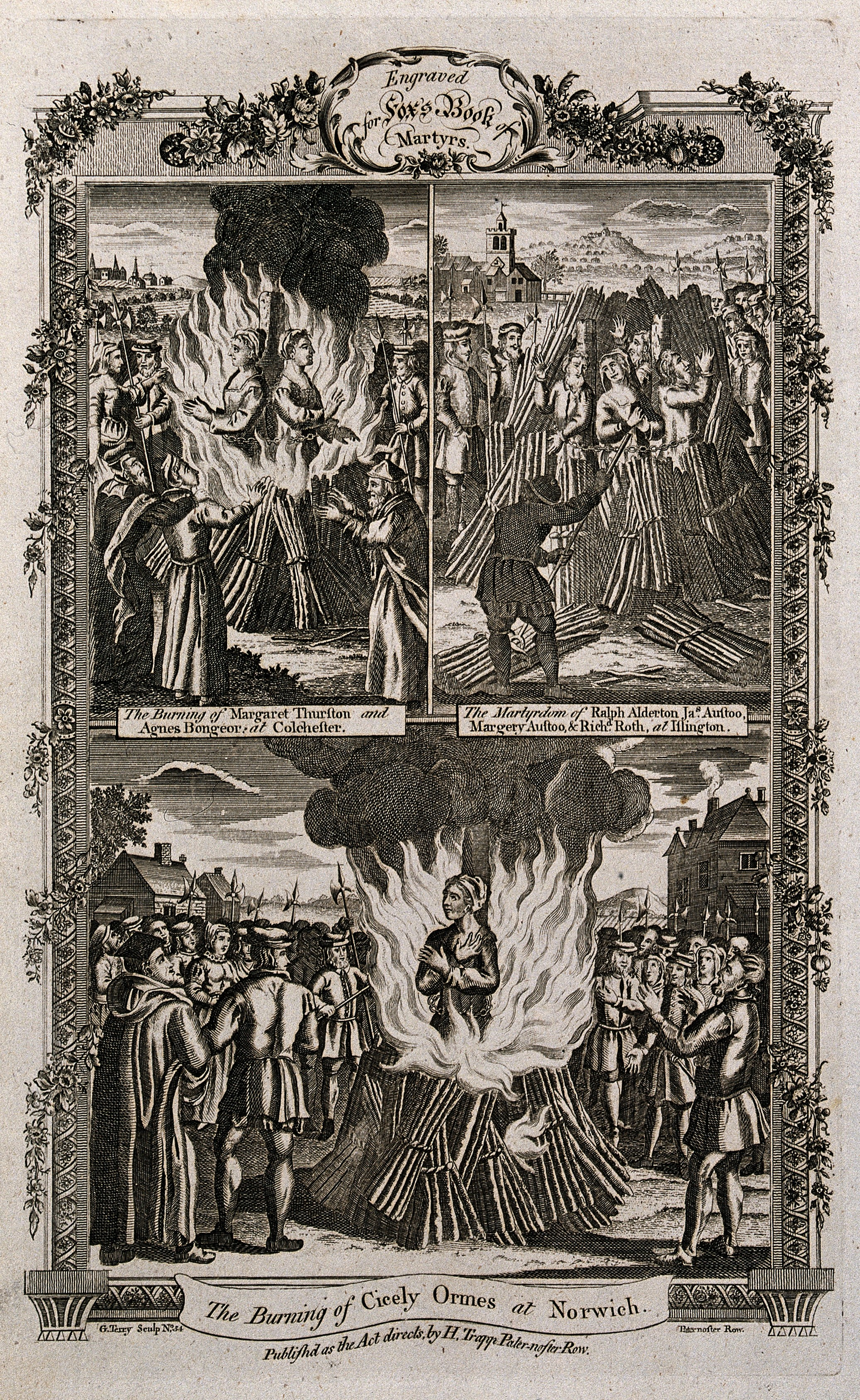
An engraving in Foxe's Book of Martyrs depicting Cicely Ormes's execution at Lollards Pit (bottom)

The only two Norwich residents to be victims of the Marian persecution – Elizabeth Cooper and Cicely Ormes – were burned at Lollards Pit. In July 1557, two Protestants who had been accused of heresy were burned at the stake at Lollards Pit. These were Simon Miller of King's Lynn, who had arrived in Norwich and asked "where he might go to have the communion," indicating a desire to attend a Protestant service, and Cooper, a resident of Norwich who had publicly rescinded her recantation of Protestantism in St Andrew's Church. At this execution Ormes declared her support for Cooper and Miller, shouting that "she would pledge them of the same cup they drank on." This led to her arrest at Lollards Pit by former city official and Catholic religious conservative John Corbet from Sprowston, and Ormes' eventual execution in front of about 200 people in late September 1558.
