= Royal Grammar School, Guildford =

Private school in Surrey, England

Royal Grammar School

Location
- High Street; Guildford, Surrey, GU1 3BB; England; 51°14′12″N 0°34′08″W

Information
- Type: Private school Day school
- Religious affiliation: Inter- / non- denominational
- Established: 1509; 517 years ago
- Founder: Robert Beckingham
- Department for Education URN: 125424 Tables
- Chair of governors: S K Creedy
- Headmaster: Jonathan Mark Cox
- Staff: 100~
- Gender: boys
- Age: 11 to 18
- Enrolment: 974~
- Houses: Austen; Beckingham; Hamonde; Nettles; Powell; Valpy
- Colours: Red, Green, White
- Publication: The Guildfordian
- Alumni: Old Guildfordians (OGs)
- School hymn: 'To Be a Pilgrim'
- Website: www.rgs-guildford.co.uk

Listed Building – Grade I
- Official name: The Grammar School
- Designated: 1 May 1953
- Reference no.: 1294936

The Royal Grammar School, Guildford (originally 'The Free School'), also known as the RGS, is a private selective day school for boys in Guildford, Surrey in England. The school dates its founding to the death of Robert Beckingham in 1509 who left provision in his will to "make a free scole at the Towne of Guldford"; in 1512 a governing body was set up to form the school. The school moved to the present site in the upper High Street after the granting of a royal charter from Edward VI in 1552. Around that time, its pupils were playing cricket and their activity was later documented as the earliest definite reference to the sport. The school's Old Building, constructed between 1557 and 1586, is the home of a rare example of a chained library. It was established on the death of John Parkhurst, Bishop of Norwich, in 1575. Although defined as a 'free' school, the first statutes of governance, approved in 1608, saw the introduction of school fees, at the rate of 4 shillings per annum, along with the school's first admissions test. During the late 19th century the school ran into financial difficulty, which nearly resulted in its closure. A number of rescue options were explored, including amalgamation with Archbishop Abbott's School. Funds were eventually raised, however, which allowed the school to remain open, although boarding was no longer offered.

Fee paying continued until the school adopted voluntary controlled status under the Education Act 1944; thereafter tuition was free and the common entrance examination at 11 was introduced. Soon after, in 1958, the school expanded with the construction of the New Building in the grounds of Allen House, a building used for a number of years as a boarding house and later as classrooms. Allen House was later demolished in 1964 just after the completion of the New Building. During December 1962 the historic Old Building caught fire, damaging a large part of it, including the two oldest rooms in the school. The damage was so great the reconstruction took over two years. The school became independent and fee paying in 1977, when the parents and staff raised sufficient funds to purchase the school following concerns about the abolition of grammar school status with the introduction of comprehensive education.

The school initially educated 30 of the 'poorest men's sons', though has since grown to have approximately 900 students, about 300 of whom are in the sixth form. The majority of pupils, approximately two thirds, enter at age 11 in the first form, a few (3–5 pupils) enter in the second form at the age of 12, with the remainder entering at 13 in the third form. Admissions are based on an entrance examination set by the school, and an interview. The school partakes in a number of sporting activities, and has enjoyed some success, including finishing within the top two in the Daily Mail Cup twice. The school maintains a grammar school ethos, and as such runs a number of outreach programmes for students from local maintained schools, for which it won the Independent School Award 2010 for Outstanding Community/ Public Benefit Initiative. The Headmaster is a member of the Headmasters' and Headmistresses' Conference. In December 2025, RGS Guildford and RGS Prep announced that they will become co-educational, with the first girls being admitted from September 2027.

== History ==
=== 16th century ===
Robert Beckingham, a wealthy grocer, member of the Worshipful Company of Grocers, and Freeman of the City of London, died in 1509 leaving a will which requested that the parishioners of St Olave's Church in Southwark should obtain a licence to endow a chantry priest to say masses for his soul. If they failed to do this within two years of his death, his executors had discretion either to use the property to 'make a free scole at the Towne of Guldford' or to put the income to some other good charitable use. The licence was not obtained within the required time, and so in 1512, Beckingham's executors formally conveyed the lands in the bequest to a body of trustees consisting of the Mayor of Guildford and four 'sad and discrete men' who had formerly been mayors. With the rents, they were to provide a free grammar school in Guildford with a 'sufficient schoolmaster', to teach thirty "of the poorest-men's sons" to read and write English and cast accounts perfectly, so that they would be fit to become apprentices. The school was built in 1520 in Castle Ditch (now Castle Street) with financial assistance from Guildford municipal corporation.

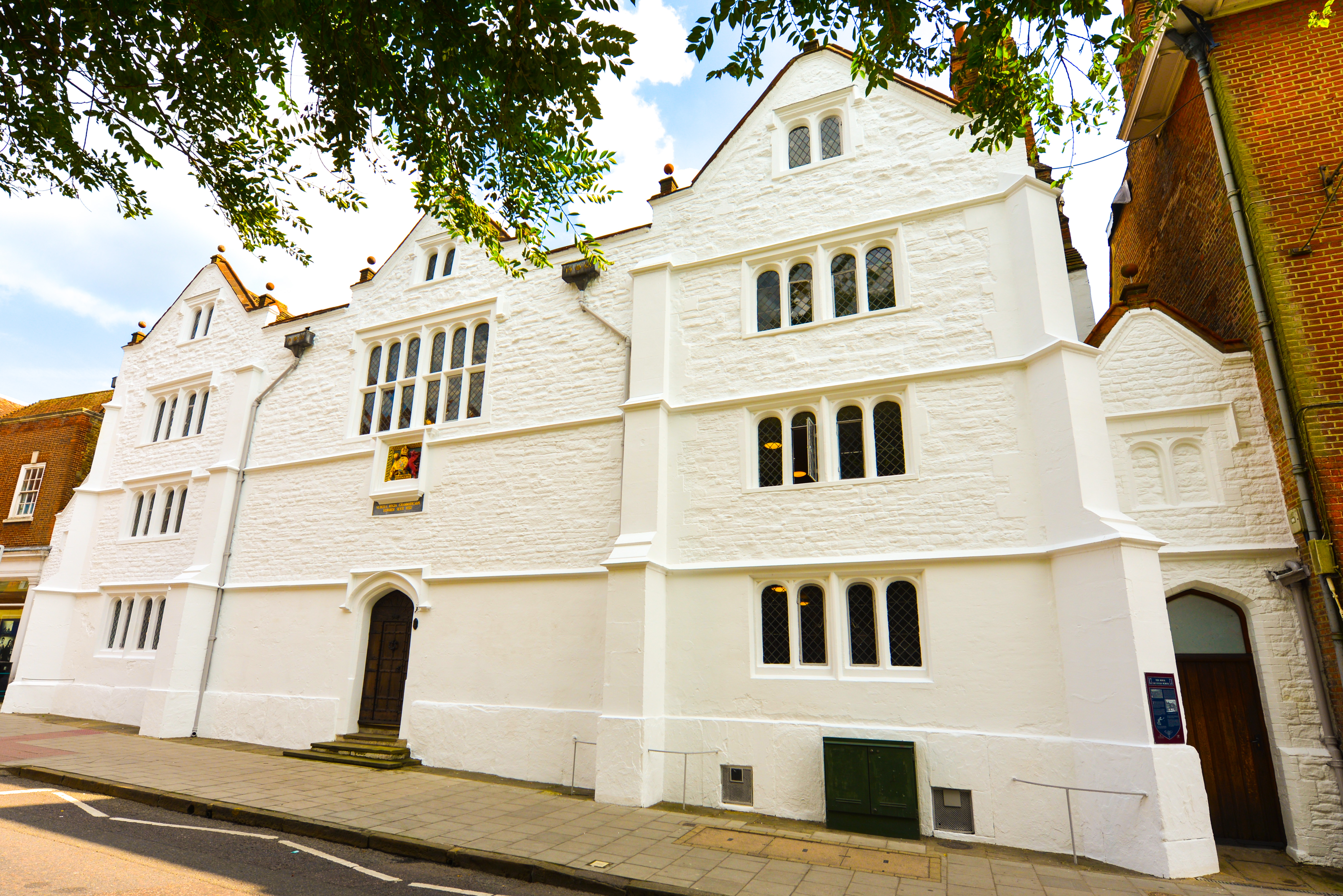
The Old Building of the Royal Grammar School, Guildford in 2013

Over the coming years the school ran into financial difficulty and so "The Mayor and Approved Men" of Guildford petitioned Edward VI to grant them further endowments for maintenance. One of the King's closest advisers, William Parr, had a particular affection for the town, having himself spent a large amount of time at the King's manor house in Guildford, and it was he who advised the King to re-appropriate some of the funds arising from the Abolition of the Chantries Acts to the school. Thus in January 1552 Edward VI ordered that there was to be "one Grammar School in Guildford called the Free Grammar School of King Edward VI for the education, institution and instruction of boys and youths in Grammar at all future times forever to endure", along with a grant of 20 pounds per year; the school acquired therewith the right to style itself a Royal Grammar School. The high street site was purchased in 1555 with the construction of the Grade I listed Tudor Old Building starting in 1557. Construction was completed in 1586.

In the years around 1550, a pupil at the school was John Derrick who in later life became a Queen's Coroner for the county of Surrey. In 1597, Derrick made a legal deposition that contains the earliest definite reference to cricket being played anywhere in the world. This is preserved in the "Constitution Book" of Guildford. In January 1597 (Old Style – 1598 New Style), he bore written testimony as to a parcel of land in the parish of Holy Trinity Church, Guildford which, originally waste, had been appropriated and enclosed by one John Parvish to serve as a timber yard. This land, said Derrick, he had known for fifty years past and:

Being a scholler in the ffree schoole of Guldeford, hee and diverse of his fellows did runne and play there at creckett and other plaies.

John Derrick was then aged 59 and his testimony confirms that cricket was being played by children in Surrey c.1550 and it is perhaps significant that cricket is the only one of the "plaies" referred to by name. Derrick was a coroner and so it must be assumed his deposition was accurate.

The death of John Parkhurst, the Bishop of Norwich, in 1575 resulted in the founding of the school's chained library. In his will he gave "the most parte of all my Latten bookes whereof shall be made a catalogue as shortelie as I may God sendinge me lief", although obtaining these books was not without its difficulties. Initially the executors of his will used "all the cullerable shifts and practices" to prevent the books from moving to the school. These continued to such an extent that the mayor was forced to complain to the Lord High Treasurer, William Cecil, who summoned the executors to London. Upon a hearing with the executors, the Lord Treasurer referred them to Sir Walter Mildmay who was Chancellor of the Exchequer at the time. He demanded that the executors give everything left in the Will to the school. Following the ruling, however, the books passed to Edmund Freke, the new Bishop of Norwich, who kept them for himself at his residence. This continued until the school obtained letters from Her Majesty's Privy Council requiring the books be delivered. The books then finally arrived at the school several years late, although the Bishop kept a number of the best for himself. Since this date the library has been added to, most notably between 1600 and 1800. The library is housed within the Gallery (now the Headmaster's Study) in the Old Building, with the present bookcases dating from 1897. The oldest book within the library was printed in Venice around 1480, with the oldest English book printed in about 1500 bearing the imprint of Wynkyn de Worde. Today the library is one of the few remaining examples of a chained library located within a school.

=== 17th century ===
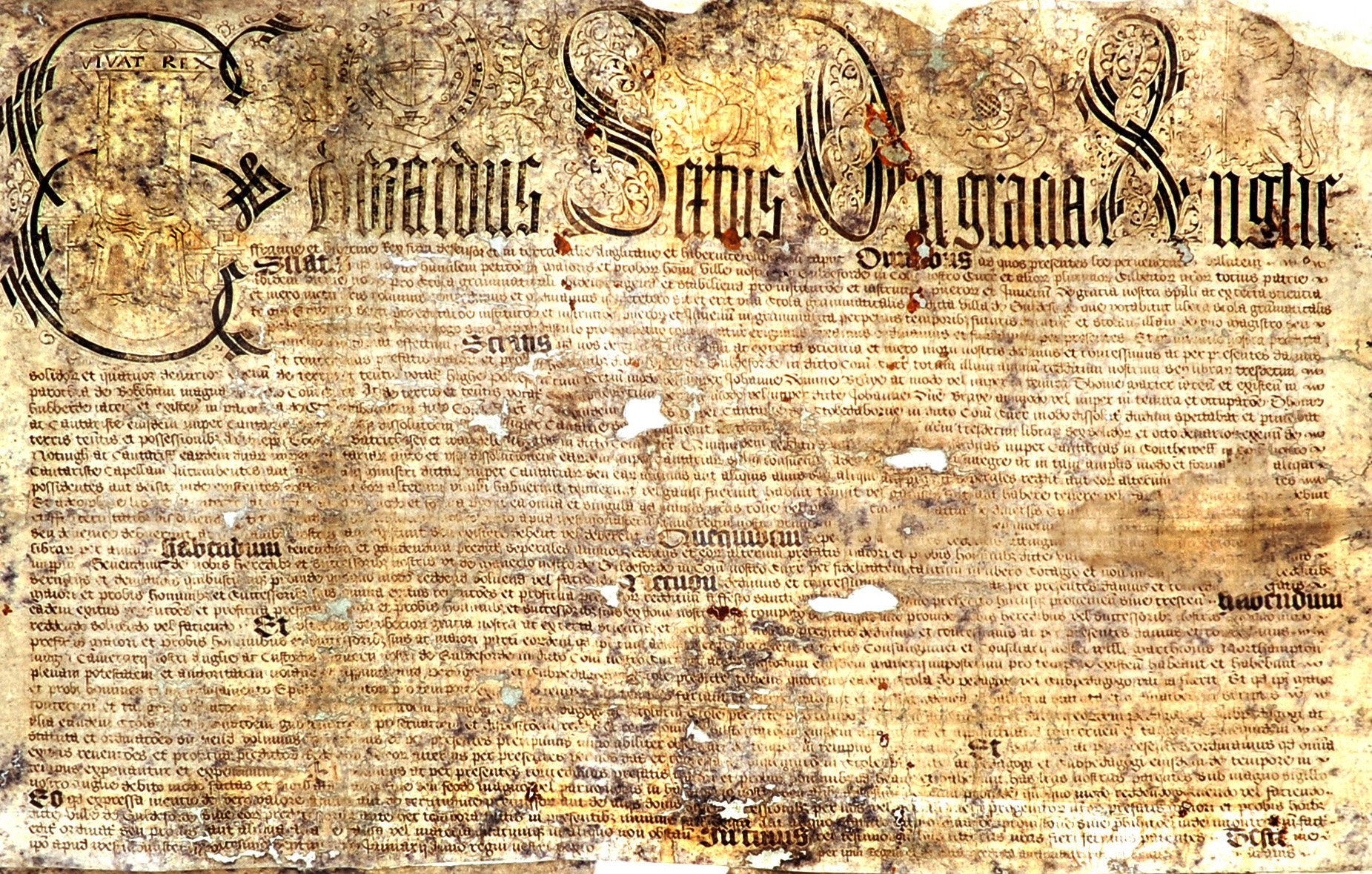
The original charter granted to the school by Edward VI

After the granting of the charter, it took 50 years before the first set of statutes to govern the school were completed. The Bishop of Winchester approved the statutes on 16 September 1608, and they constituted a major change in the way the school was run. Until this point the boys were instructed in English and accounting, but following the statutes lessons were in the subjects of Latin and Greek; with students required to speak in Latin unless licensed by the master to do otherwise. Admissions following the charter also changed, with "none to be admitted scholar into the said school before he be brought to the schoolmaster of that school, and upon his examination shall be found to have learned the rudiments of grammar, called the Accidence." All scholars from the town of Guildford were required to pay the master 5 shillings on admission to the school, and for those from outside the town the charge was 10s. The number of pupils at the school was capped at 100, although this number was rarely reached. The statues also saw the introduction of school fees. Although defined as a "free" school, fees were still charged at the rate of 4s. per annum, paid as 9d. per quarter for the provision of "rods and brooms", with an additional shilling due on the feast of St. Michael, which was used to pay for "clean, wax candles".

On the death of Joseph Nettles (an old boy of the school) in 1691 the school's first university scholarship was founded. Nettles left eleven acres of land in his will to his daughter Elizabeth Brindley, then following her death to Sir Richard Onslow and his heirs, with the rents from the land to be paid to the school for the maintenance of a scholar at Oxford or Cambridge. The scholar was to be a son of a freeman of the town of Guildford who "should have read some Greek author" and "be well instructed and knowing in the Latin tongue". His fitness in these fields was tested by the master of the school, and the rectors of the parishes of Stoke next Guildford and St. Nicholas in Guildford. If admitted to any college within the universities, he would then receive the rents from the lands for six years. At the end of six years, upon the scholar's death, or his removal from the university (whichever the sooner), another scholar was selected. If no scholar was deemed suitable and a vacancy arose, then the next scholar selected would receive the standard yearly rate, along with any rents acquired during the vacancy. The rents arising from the lands were roughly £23 per year. The scholarship ceased to be awarded at some point after 1951.

=== 19th century ===
In 1866 the then headmaster Revd Henry G Merriman (headmaster 1859–75) purchased Allen House, a large house set in extensive grounds which stood opposite the school. The house took its name from Anthony Allen, Master of Chancery and Mayor of Guildford in 1740. This was initially used as a boarding house for the school between 1866 and 1874 before later being purchased by Surrey County Council in 1921 and was used by the school until its demolition in 1964. The grounds surrounding the house were purchased in 1914 by HA Powell and donated to the school as playing fields.

During the mid to late 19th century the school fell into disrepair and decay. Guildford Municipal Charities established a committee to report into the general condition of the school and the buildings. The committee reported in 1881 that the school had no funds available for repairs and that there were only nine boys "instead of the former ordinary number of 100". Various suggestions were made by the Charity Commission to raise funds for the school, including a reorganisation with Archbishop Abbot's School. The Committee for Maintaining Higher Education in Guildford was established in March 1887 to oppose the Charity Commission's draft scheme to amalgamate the RGS, Nettle's Charity and Archbishop Abbot's School. The committee raised £2,238 15s. 4d. (approximately £108,000 in 2010) towards the restoration of the RGS, ensuring its survival. A new Charity Commission scheme came into effect in November 1888 which resulted in the Old Building being restored, and the school's continuation as a day only school. Several years later under the Education Act 1944 the school adopted voluntary controlled status; tuition was therefore free and entrance was to be by common examination at the age of eleven.

=== 20th century ===
The logo used by the school during the year 2009/2010, to celebrate the 500th anniversary of the founding of the school

The construction of the New Building started in 1958 in the grounds of Allen House and initially consisted of a gymnasium, assembly hall, dining hall and kitchens, caretaker's flat, staff common rooms, junior library, cloakrooms and changing rooms, eight classrooms, science lecture theatre, five science laboratories, geography and art rooms, and various offices, stores and smaller rooms arranged in a J shape. The construction of the initial building was finished in 1963.

On the morning of Sunday 2 December 1962, a fire broke out in the Old Building. It caused widespread damage to a large part of the structure, including the two oldest rooms in the school, School Room and Big School. The main concern was to prevent the books contained within the chained library from being damaged, either by fire or water from the fire brigade's hoses. The damage to the building was so great that rebuilding took over 2 years, with the unusually cold winter of 1962–1963 delaying the restoration. Lessons, however, continued throughout on the Allen House side of the high street.

The school became independent in 1977 when the parents and staff of the school, led by the Chairman of the Governors, John Fergrieve Brown, raised sufficient funds to purchase the school. The RGS then withdrew from the government maintained system, becoming independent and fee paying. This was followed in 1978 by the purchase of Lanesborough Preparatory School which became the junior school, preparing boys for entry to the RGS at either 11 or 13.

=== 21st century ===
Princess Anne, The Princess Royal visited the school in 2009/2010 as part of celebrations for the quincentennial anniversary of the founding of the school by Robert Beckingham; numerous events were organised, including a new musical work based loosely on the school hymn "To be a Pilgrim".

RGS Guildford has opened a campus in Doha, Qatar as part of Qatar's Outstanding Schools Program. RGS Guildford in Qatar was open initially to boys and girls ages three to seven years old (pre-school to year 2) in September, with the rest of the primary school opening in 2017. According to Bob Ukaih the school aims to open two separate single-sex secondary schools – one for girls and one for boys – in Doha by September 2018.

Following the announcement of the formation of a partner school in Qatar, the school came under fire from current and former pupils, as well as concerned members of the public, due to the country's poor human rights record. An online petition was started by a former pupil in April 2016 challenging the decision to open the school, however, this proved unsuccessful and The Royal Grammar School Guildford in Qatar (RGSGQ) opened for pupils on 19 September 2016. The school was also criticised for claiming to be an inclusive environment for all students, regardless of sexual orientation, while opening partner schools in countries where men involved in same-sex activities face the death penalty. The controversy spread when articles in The Times, the Daily Mail and The Guardian claimed that RGS had removed its policies on homophobic bullying from the rules in RGS Qatar. A spokesperson from RGS said the school had to abide by the rules of the country in which it operates, but many pupils, staff and members of the public have voiced their concern online.

October 2016 saw the opening of the John Brown building which replaced Trevone House for the Classics, Economics, History and Politics departments as well as for Design Technology. The building incorporates modern ecological design with a roof terrace and glass bridge connecting it to the first floor of the Main Building.

RGS Guildford also opened RGSG Dubai, a new campus in Dubai, UAE, which started accepting both boys and girls from ages 3–18 in September 2021, in partnership with Cognita. The school has grown to have over 1,800 students.

RGSG Nanjing was also opened in China in September 2020 in partnership with Gemdale Education, part of the Gemdale Corporation, a major Chinese property developer. There are currently over 500 boys and girls attending.

RGSG Muscat is currently RGS Guildford's fourth international school, located in Oman. It opened in September 2023 and provides a co-educational education from 3–18. It has approximately 1,165 students.

Lanesborough School merged with the Royal Grammar School, with the former becoming RGS Prep, in 2021.

In 2023, the school was the site of an industrial dispute over plans to withdraw from the Teacher's Pension Scheme. The teachers chose to strike, not attending lessons, in response to proposed moves to force lower-yielding pension options, or be subject to 'fire and rehire' plans.

== School life ==
As in most schools in the UK there are three terms in the academic year:

- The Michaelmas Term from early September to mid-December. This is the normal term for new pupils to be admitted into the school
- The Lent Term from early January to a time a week or two before Easter falls that year
- The Trinity Term from mid-late April to early July, during which time pupils sit most public exams

There are six houses at the RGS, named after various benefactors of the school:

House Name	House Colour	Benefactor
Austen	Yellow	John Austen
Beckingham	Red	Robert Beckingham
Hamonde	Dark Blue	William Hamonde
Nettles	Light Blue	Joseph Nettles
Powell	Maroon	Powell Family
Valpy	White	Arthur Valpy

Each pupil is assigned to one of the six houses upon joining the school, and a pupil's house can be indicated to others by optional house-coloured ties.

The Hardy Cup used to be called the Cock House Cup, the traditional name given in British public schools for the in-school competition cup, but it was renamed by 16 June 2022. The Senior Housemaster (Karim Tayar) believed the concept of having a 'cock of the school' was contradictory to RGS's ethos of respect, teamwork, and fun. The name 'Hardy' comes from the donors of the original trophy used, Bertrand and Stanley Hardy.

The school's uniform up to the end of Fifth Form is a white shirt, grey trousers and a blazer. A grey v-neck pullover may also be worn. For the lower and upper sixth, navy blue or grey suits are instead worn, and upper sixth formers are permitted to wear pastel shaded shirts.

=== Sport ===
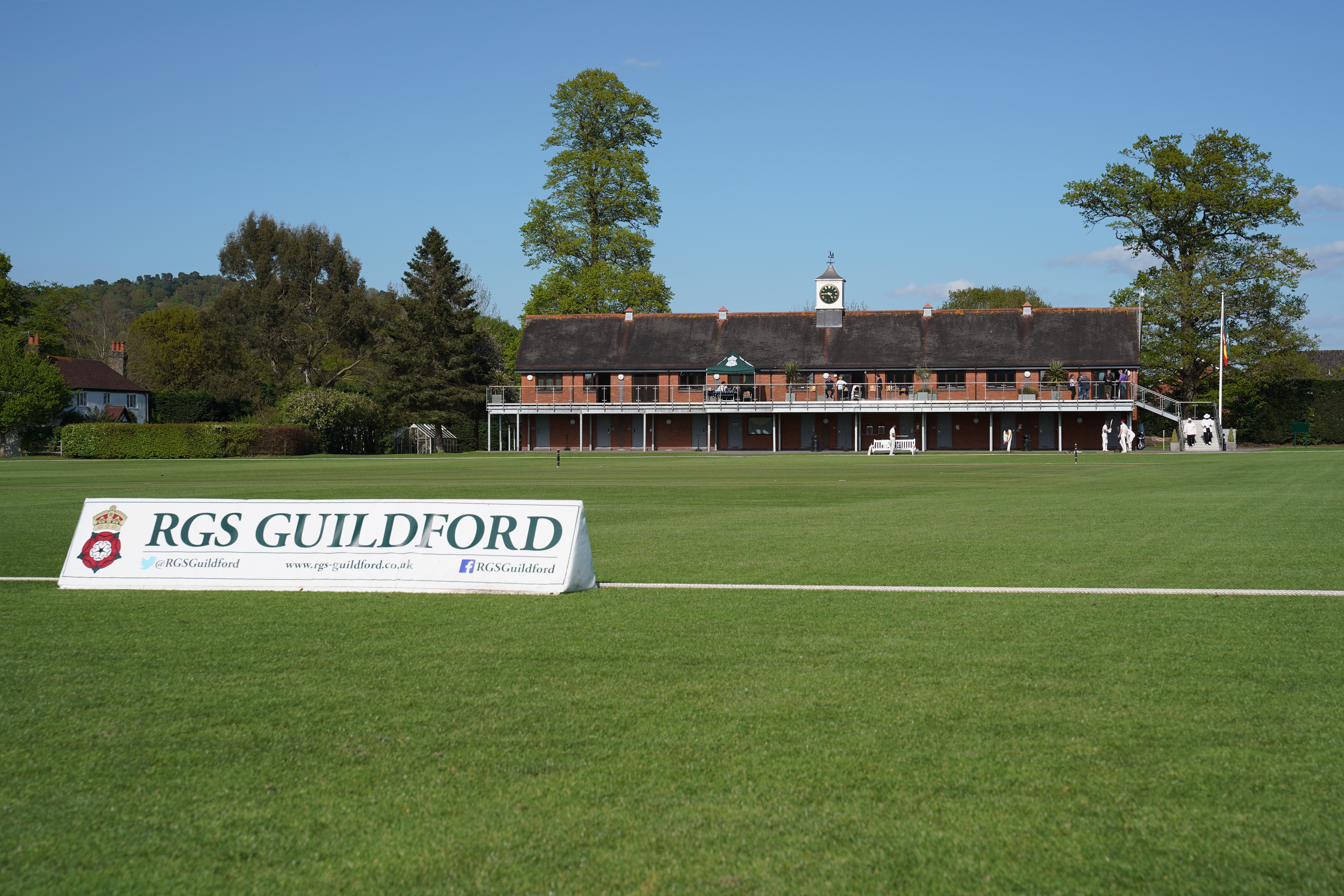
View towards the First XI cricket pitch and pavilion at the school playing fields, Bradstone Brook.

The school has enjoyed some success in rugby where it has had first and second places at various levels of the Daily Mail Cup.

On 6 February 2016, Old Guildfordian Jack Clifford became a full England rugby international when he made his full debut as a replacement for Chris Robshaw during the Calcutta Cup match after 69 minutes.

Since 2003 the six Royal Grammar Schools (Colchester, High Wycombe, Guildford, Lancaster, Newcastle, Worcester) have held the "RGS Cricket Festival", hosted by a different school each year. It is based on a round robin format and held over a period of five days towards the end of the Trinity term.

The school has no playing fields on the town centre site. A 20 acres (8.1 ha) ground called Bradstone Brook, located a few miles away in the village of Chilworth, is the location of the rugby and cricket pitches. There is a single AstroTurf located at the main school for hockey and football. The majority of hockey takes place at Guildford Hockey Club, located at Broadwater School in Farncombe or Surrey Sports Park. Athletics and swimming both take place at Guildford Spectrum.

=== Extra-curricular activities ===
There are several dozen clubs and societies at the school, as well as The Register (originally Really Good Stuff), a termly newsletter documenting achievements at the school.

Music is part of the core curriculum for first to third forms. Pupils take lessons with peripatetic music staff within different disciplines. There is a symphony orchestra composed of students, along with several other smaller classical ensembles. The RGS choir perform regularly in Guildford Cathedral, and have in the past performed at The Royal Albert Hall. In addition to classical music, there are also a number of jazz and rock bands within the school as well, and to recognise this in addition to the four main music prizes awarded each year, there is an additional contemporary music prize.

Drama is offered as an academic subject from the first form. Plays are staged for all year groups in association with local girls schools. The department has an auditorium which was converted from the old gymnasium as well as the Hansford Room studio sited in the North Building.

Period 8 is for extra-curricular activities which include Combined Cadet Force, outdoor pursuits, Scouts, lifesaving and community service. There are five field days in the year, on which these activities take place. Before the fourth form, pupils have the opportunity to decide between the CCF, outdoor pursuits and the scouts. The Duke of Edinburgh's Award scheme is 'Hors Combat' for choice, being available to all students, regardless of their other options, so no longer officially constitutes part of period 8.

== Admission and fees ==
Initially tuition at the school was free, funded by various endowments and rents obtained from lands the most significant arising from the Abolition of the Chantries Acts, and the re-appropriation of funds to the school. In 1944 under the Education Act education remained free, however the common entrance exam at eleven was introduced and the school became a selective grammar school. School fees were introduced in 1977 when the school withdrew from the maintained system and became independent. For the year 2025/26 they are £27,000 (approximately €30,000 or US$35,000 as of November 2025) per year excluding lunches. All those wishing to be admitted now take the school's own internal 11+ entrance examination which tests creative writing, mathematics and verbal reasoning and attend an interview with a member of staff. Previously those entering at thirteen had to take the 13+ Common Entrance or the scholarship examination to confirm their place, but starting 2026, 13+ entrance is no longer accepted .

Numerous scholarships are available at both 11+ and 13+ for music, academic achievement, and one for art at thirteen. Music and academic scholarships range in value between 5%–10% with one Kings Scholarship available for a 10% reduction in fees. These scholarships are awarded based on performance in subject specific exams or performances, and an interview for academic or music scholarships, or the presentation of a portfolio of work for the art scholarship. Until the start of the 2009/2010 academic year, the value of scholarships was substantially higher with the King's Scholarships worth 50% of the fees and a range of lower scholarships between 10 and 30%.

== Charitable status and public benefit ==
The school is a registered charity and currently has three charities registered with the Charities Commission: King Edward VI's Grammar School (The Royal Grammar School), Guildford, The Royal Grammar School Guildford (representing the governors), and The Royal Grammar School Guildford Foundation After the withdrawal of the Assisted Places Scheme in 1997 the social diversity of the school decreased, as a result the school began to offer bursaries to students whose parents could not afford the fees, with the first bursary offered in 2007.

The school also runs numerous outreach programmes for children from maintained schools in the local area, including a series of master-classes in science, mathematics, technology, languages and drama for local primary school children. Also for primary school children is the Tudor Experience Project where students can explore the Tudor past of the school through a number of activities. At the higher end of the school, numerous careers and university seminars are run for sixth form students from the local area, in addition to Oxbridge preparation classes and practice interviews for local sixth form students. The school also runs several more outreach programmes, and as a result of these initiatives was recently awarded the Independent School Award 2010 for Outstanding Community/Public Benefit Initiative.

== Headmasters ==
The post of headmaster (schoolmaster or just master as it was originally known) was created following the grant of the Royal Charter in 1552, with the first appointment made in 1554. There have been 35 appointments since the creation of the position. Until the re-organisation of the school in 1888, the post was almost exclusively filled by men from a religious background; the first headmaster was Sir Lawson, a friar from the monastery in Guildford that had been dissolved in 1538. The most notable headmaster was Roger Goad (1569–1575), who was Provost of King's College, Cambridge and three times Vice-Chancellor of the University of Cambridge; he was headmaster during the time when George Abbot (Archbishop of Canterbury 1611–1633) was at the school.

== Notable alumni ==
- Robert Horne, Bishop of Winchester
- George Abbot, Archbishop of Canterbury (1611–1633)
- Arthur Onslow, Speaker of the House of Commons (1728–1761)
- Sir George Grey, Premier of New Zealand (1877–1879)
- Terry Jones, Member of the Monty Python comedy troupe
- Bob Willis, England cricket captain
- Andy Salmon, Commandant General Royal Marines
- Simon Bird, Actor and comedian
- Martin Tyler, Football commentator
- Simon Lazenby, Sky Sports F1 anchor
- Arvid Lindblad, Formula 1 racing driver
- Philip Sales, Lord Sales, Deputy President of the Supreme Court of the United Kingdom

== See also ==
- List of the oldest schools in the United Kingdom
