= John Hopton =

The Right Reverend John Hopton
- Bishop of Norwich
- Diocese: Diocese of Norwich
- Term ended: 1558 (death)
- Predecessor: Thomas Thirlby
- Successor: John Parkhurst
- Other post: Chaplain to the Lady Mary (c. 1547–c. 1553)

Orders
- Consecration: 28 October 1554 by Edmund Bonner

Personal details
- Died: December 1558
- Buried: Norwich Cathedral
- Denomination: Roman Catholic
- Education: University of Bologna, Italy

John Hopton (died 1558) was the last Roman Catholic Bishop of Norwich.

He was a member of the Dominican Order by 1516, in Oxford. He was educated at the University of Bologna in Italy, where he took a doctorate in theology.

During the reign of Edward VI, Hopton was chaplain to the Lady Mary, later Queen Mary I, and was summoned before the privy council in 1549 and ordered to stop celebrating the Catholic Mass.

When Mary acceded to the throne, Hopton was appointed Bishop of Norwich, and was consecrated on 28 October 1554. John Foxe, in his Acts and Monuments described him, with Michael Dunning, the "bloody chancellor" of Norwich, as a ruthless persecutor of Protestants, "in such sort, that many of them he perverted, and brought quite from the truth, and some from their wits also". Hopton was mainly responsible for the burning of over thirty Protestants in Norwich during his tenure.

Hopton died in December 1558, and he is buried in Norwich Cathedral.

Church of England titles
| Preceded by Thomas Thirlby | Bishop of Norwich; 1554–1558 | Succeeded by John Parkhurst |
