= Declaration of faith =

A declaration of faith is a phrase that is said by a member of any religion to show either to themselves, their God or other members of the religion their belief and faith in the religion. Notable declarations of faith include confirmation and adult baptism in Christianity, the Shahada in Islam and the Shema Yisrael in Judaism.

There are numerous other declarations of faith, typically performed during religious rituals in many faiths. Often, the declaration of faith is led by the leader of the congregation and followers respond in kind.

In Roman Catholicism, a declaration of faith may be used in various circumstances, both for purpose of conversion and of reaffirmation. In the Easter Vigil a declaration of faith is integral to the party becoming Catholic, while in baptism the declaration of faith is used to reaffirm the faith of the parents and godparents, and in the name of the child-to-be-baptized, anticipating the mysteries into which they will be incorporated. The declaration of faith, generally known as the Profession of Faith, may also feature within the Sacrifice of the Mass, especially in the Easter season.

== See also ==
- Religious identity
