= Roger Goad =

English theologian

Roger Goad (1538–1610) was an English academic theologian, Provost of King's College, Cambridge, and three times Vice-Chancellor of the University of Cambridge.

== Life ==
He was born at Horton, Buckinghamshire, and was educated at Eton College and King's College, Cambridge, where he was admitted a scholar 1 September 1555, and a fellow 2 September 1558. He graduated B.A. in 1559, and commenced M.A. in 1563. On 19 January 1566 he was enjoined to study theology, and he proceeded B.D. in 1569. At this period he was master of the Royal Grammar School, Guildford, where one of his pupils was George Abbot.

On the deprivation of Philip Baker, Goad was recommended as his successor in the office of provost of King's College, Cambridge, by Edmund Grindal, Walter Haddon, and Henry Knollys. On 28 February 1570 the vice-provost and fellows addressed a letter to the queen asking for a free election, and another to Sir William Cecil recommending Goad, who was nominated by the queen on 4 March. He was elected, and admitted on 19 March. As Provost he re-established the college library, instituted numerous educational reforms, and began to examine candidates before admission; he met much opposition from the junior members. One of his opponents was Giles Fletcher, the Elder. On 3 November 1572 he was elected Lady Margaret's preacher, an office he held until 1577. He was created D.D. in 1573, and was vice-chancellor of the university for the year commencing November 1576.

On 6 March 1577 he became chancellor of the diocese of Wells. He was also chaplain to Ambrose Dudley, 3rd Earl of Warwick, and held the rectory of Milton, Cambridgeshire (which eventually came to King's). In October 1580 he was, with Dr. Bridgwater and William Fulke, engaged in examining some of the Family of Love who were confined in Wisbech Castle, and in September 1581 he and Fulke had conferences in the Tower of London with Edmund Campion. In 1595 and in 1607 he was vice-chancellor for a second and third time. He died on 24 April 1610, and was buried in a chantry on the north side of King's College Chapel.

== Family ==
He married Katharine, daughter of Richard Hill of London. Six sons were elected from Eton to King's, viz. Matthew, Thomas, Robert, Roger, Christopher, and Richard.
