= Edmund Freke =

English dean and bishop

- Bishop of Worcester
- Church: Church of England
- Diocese: Diocese of Worcester
- Installed: 1584
- Term ended: 1591 (death)
- Predecessor: John Whitgift
- Successor: Richard Fletcher
- Other posts: Bishop of Rochester & Archdeacon of Canterbury (1572–1575); Bishop of Norwich (1575–1584)

Orders
- Consecration: 9 March 1572 by Matthew Parker

Personal details
- Born: c. 1516 Essex
- Died: 1591 (aged 74–75)
- Denomination: Anglican
- Education: Cambridge University

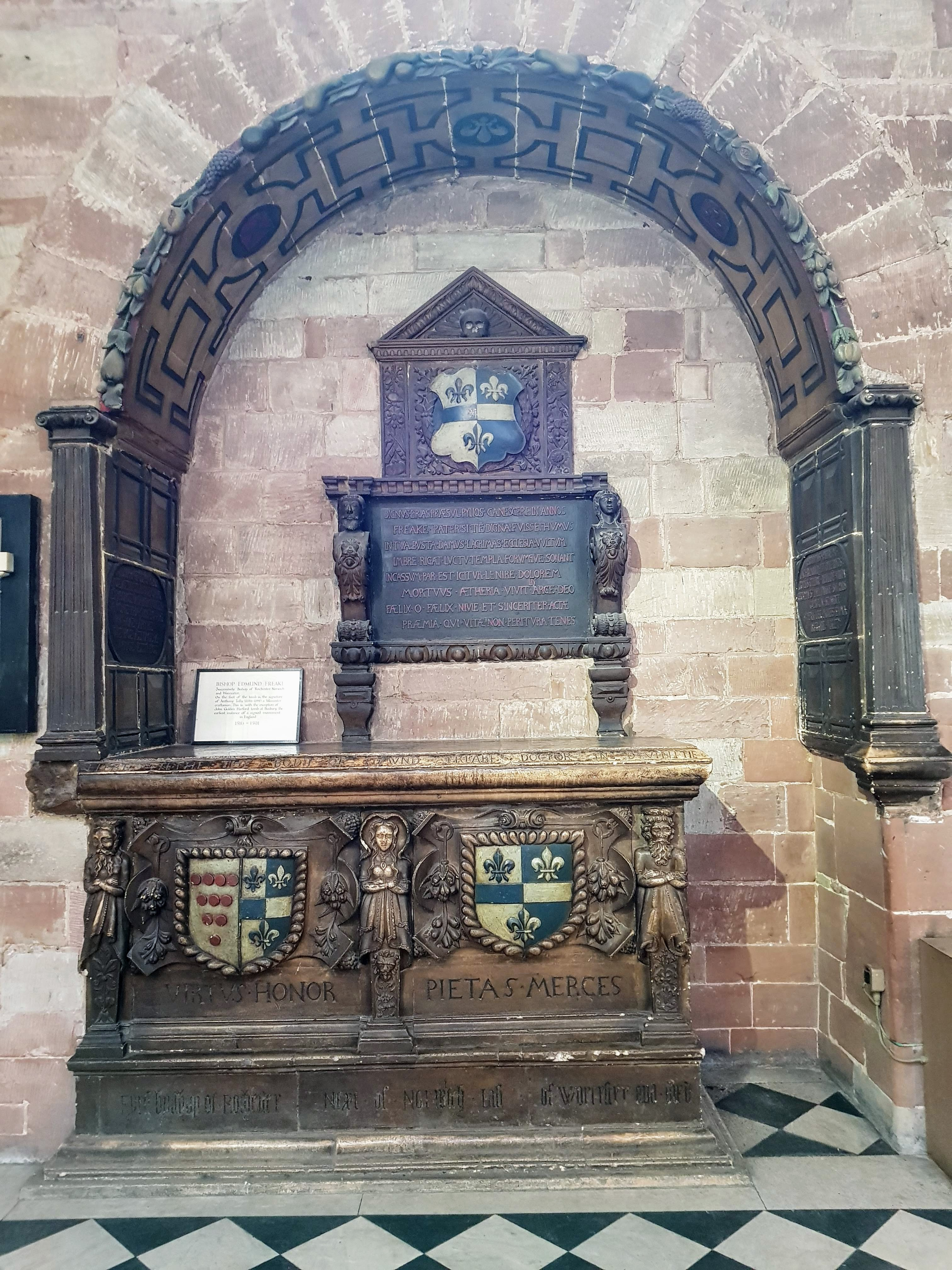
Monument to Edmund Freke, Worcester Cathedral

Edmund Freke (also spelled Freake or Freak; c. 1516–1591) was an English dean and bishop.

== Life ==
He was born in Essex, and educated at Cambridge, gaining his M.A. there c. 1550.

In 1565 he was appointed Canon of the sixth stall at St George's Chapel, Windsor Castle, a position he held until 1572.

He was Dean of Salisbury and Dean of Rochester from 1571 to 1572 when he became Bishop of Rochester and was simultaneously Archdeacon of Canterbury in commendam. In 1575, he became Bishop of Norwich. There, unlike his predecessor John Parkhurst, he campaigned hard to impose uniformity in his diocese.

In 1579 he tried and then burnt a Norfolk plowright, Matthew Hamont, for heresy.

In 1584, he became Bishop of Worcester. He was also appointed Lord Almoner, a position he held until his death.

== Notes ==
Church of England titles
Preceded by Edmund Gheast	Bishop of Rochester; 1572–1576	Succeeded by John Piers
Preceded by John Parkhurst	Bishop of Norwich; 1575–1584	Succeeded by Edmund Scambler
Preceded by John Whitgift	Bishop of Worcester; 1584–1591	Succeeded by Richard Fletcher
