= Sugworth =

Coordinates: 51.703°N 1.261°W

- Site of Special Scientific Interest
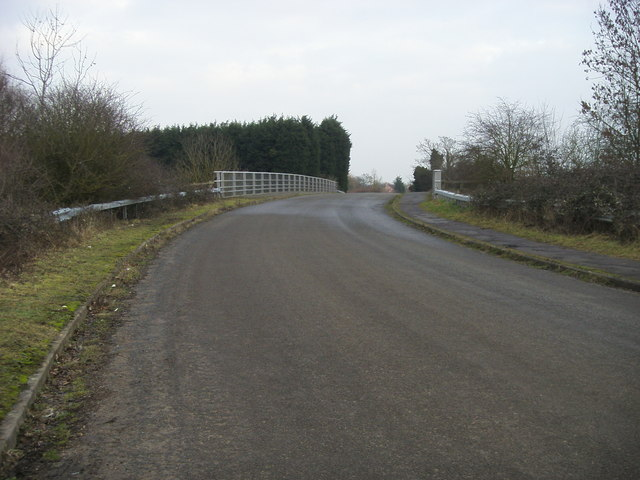
- Location of Sugworth.
- Area of search: Oxfordshire
- Grid reference: SP 512 007
- Interest: Geological
- Area: 0.6 hectares (1.5 acres)
- Notification date: 1986
- Location map: Magic Map

Sugworth is a 0.6-hectare (1.5-acre) geological Site of Special Scientific Interest north of Abingdon-on-Thames in Oxfordshire. It is a Geological Conservation Review site.

This site dates to the Cromerian Stage, an interglacial over half a million years ago. It is a river channel cut into Kimmeridge Clay of the Late Jurassic, and it has rich deposits of vertebrates, ostracods, molluscs, beetles, plant remains and pollen.
