= Michael Dunning =

Catholic Chancellor (??–1558)

Michael Dunning (d.1558) was Chancellor of the Diocese of Norwich from 1554 under Mary Tudor, and with John Hopton, Bishop of Norwich, was responsible for the burning of 31 heretics. John Foxe characterised Dunning as the "bloody chancellor."

== Life ==
He graduated Bachelor of Civil Law at the University of Cambridge in 1541, becoming Doctor in 1555. He was rector of Knapwell, Cambridgeshire in 1546; and then of Gissing, Norfolk from 1549 to 1554. After his term as the "bloody chancellor" he was in 1558 made Archdeacon of Bedford, but was removed from the post later the same year.

Among those executed by Dunning and Hopton were:

- Cicely Ormes, wife of a weaver
- Thomas Cobbe, butcher of Haverhill, Roger Coe, and James Abbes
- Simon Miller, of the town of Lynn
- Elizabeth Cooper, wife of a pewterer
