= List of biographies of Richard III of England =

List of published printed works in English where Richard III of England is among the main subjects.

Title	Year	Author	Reference
Richard III	2024	Andrea McMillin	
Richard III's books	2024	Anne F. Sutton and Livia Visser-Fuchs	
The Hours of Richard III	2024	Anne F. Sutton and Livia Visser-Fuchs	
Richard III's bodies	2022	Jeffrey R. Wilson	
The King's Grave/The Lost King	2022	Philippa Langley, John Ashdown-Hill	
Richard III: A Failed King?	2021	Rosemary Horrox	
Richard III: Loyalty Binds Me	2020	Matthew Lewis	
Richard III in the North	2020	MJ Trow	
This Son of York	2019	Anne Easter Smith	
Richard III: Fact and Fiction	2019	Matthew Lewis	
Richard III: The Self-Made King	2019	Michael Hicks	
Richard III: Brother Protector King/Englands’ Most Controversial King	2018	Chris Skidmore	
The Children of Richard III	2018	Peter Hammond	
The Family of Richard III	2017	Michael Hicks	
The Mythology of Richard III	2016	John Ashdown-Hill	
On the Trail of Richard III	2016	Kristie Dean	
Richard III	2015	David Baldwin	
Richard III: A Ruler and his reputation	2015	David Horspool	
The Bones of a King	2015	Maev Kennedy and Lin Foxhall	
Digging for Richard III	2015	Michael Pitts	
The Man who killed Richard III	2015	Susan Fern	
Richard III: The King in the car park	2015	Terry Breverton	
Richard III: The Road to Leicester	2014	Amy Licence	
Richard III: A Short Guide to the Great Debate	2013	Annette Carson	
Richard III and the Princes in the Tower	2011	Alison Weir	
Richard III and the murder in the tower	2011	Peter A. Hancock	
The Last Days of Richard III	2010	John Ashdown-Hill	
Richard III and the death of chivalry	2009	David Hipshon	
Richard III: The Young King to Be	2009	Josephine Wilkinson	
Richard III: The Maligned King	2008	Annette Carson	
Royal Blood	1998	Bertram Fields	
Richard III: A Sourcebook	1997	Keith Dockray	
Richard III and the Princes in the Tower	1991	A J Pollard	
Richard III: The Road to Bosworth	1985	Anne F. Sutton	
The Trial of Richard III	1984	Richard Drewett	
Richard III	1983	Charles Derek Ross	
Richard III	1983	Desmond Seward	
Good King Richard?	1983	Jeremy Potter	
Richard III and his early historians	1975	Alison Hanham	
The Life and Times of Richard III	1972	Anthony Cheetham	
The Betrayal of Richard III	1959	Vivian Beatrix Lamb	
Richard the Third	1955	Paul Murray Kendall	
Richard III: His Life and Character	1905	Clements Markham	
History of the Life and Reign of Richard III	1898	James Gairdner	
The Unpopular King	1885	Alfred Owen Legge	
Historic Doubts on the Life and Reign of Richard III	1768	Horace Walpole	
The History of Richard III	1619	George Buck	
Richard III	1513	Thomas More	
The Usurpation of Richard III	1485	Dominic Mancini	
