= The Morland Dynasty =

Series of novels by Cynthia Harrod-Eagles

The Morland Dynasty is a series of historical novels by Cynthia Harrod-Eagles, in the genre of a family saga. They recount the lives of the Morland family of York, England and their national and international relatives and associates.

There are currently 36 books in the series. The first book begins in 1434 and features the Wars of the Roses; the most recent book begins in 1936 and deals Edward VIII's abdication and the start of WWII. The book series in order according to the author's webpage is:

Book number	Name	Publication date	Historical period
1	The Founding	1980	1434 – Wars of the Roses and Richard III of England
2	The Dark Rose	1981	1501 – Henry VIII
3	The Princeling	1981	1558 – Elizabeth I of England and Mary, Queen of Scots
4	The Oak Apple	1982	1630 – Charles I; the English Civil War
5	The Black Pearl	1982	1659 – Charles II; The Restoration
6	The Long Shadow	1983	1670 – Charles II and James II
7	The Chevalier	1984	1689 – William III and Mary II; Queen Anne; George I; The Old Pretender, Jacobite rising of 1715
8	The Maiden	1985	1720 – George I; George II; the Young Pretender (Bonnie Prince Charlie, Jacobite rising of 1745
9	The Flood-Tide	1986	1772 – George III; the American War of Independence
10	The Tangled Thread	1987	1788 – The French Revolution; beginning of Industrial Revolution
11	The Emperor	1988	1795 – Napoleon
12	The Victory	1989	1803
13	The Regency	1990	1807 – The Napoleonic Wars; the Peninsular War; the Industrial Revolution
14	The Campaigners	1991	1815 – The Hundred Days Campaign and Battle of Waterloo
15	The Reckoning	1992	1816 – Post-war slump; Chartism; Pentrich Revolution; industrial progress
16	The Devil's Horse	1993	1820 – George IV; the railway
17	The Poison Tree	1994	1831 – William IV
18	The Abyss	1995	1833 – William IV; Victoria
19	The Hidden Shore	1996	1843 – The early Victorian era
20	The Winter Journey	1997	1851 – The Mid-Victorian era; The Great Exhibition; the Crimean War
21	The Outcast	1998	1857 – The American Civil War
22	The Mirage	1999	1870 – High Victorian Age; Franco-Prussian War
23	The Cause	2000	1874 – Women's Rights
24	The Homecoming	2001	1885 – The Late Victorian era
25	The Question	2002	1898 – Late Victorian/Edwardian; the Second Boer War; Automobiles; the Suffragettes
26	The Dream Kingdom	2003	1908 – Edwardian era; Aviation
27	The Restless Sea	2004	1912 – The Titanic; George V
28	The White Road	2005	1914 – The beginning of World War I
29	The Burning Roses	2006	1915 – World War I
30	The Measure of Days	2007	1916 – World War I: Battle of the Somme
31	The Foreign Field	2009	1917 – World War I: Battle of Passchendaele
32	The Fallen Kings	2009	1918 – The end of World War I; Armistice of 11 November 1918; demobilisation
33	The Dancing Years	Nov 2010	1919 – Demobilisation and peace
34	The Winding Road	Nov 2011	1925 – The Jazz Age; Wall Street crash of 1929
35	The Phoenix	Sept 2013	1931 – Great Depression; Hollywood and the Talkies; Edward VIII and Wallis Simpson
36	The Gathering Storm	Aug 2024	1936 – Edward VIII abdication; the start of WWII

== See also ==
- Cultural depictions of Henry VIII
- Cynthia Harrod-Eagles
