= Anne F. Sutton =

British historian (1942–2022)

Anne F. Sutton FSA FRHist
- Born: 3 November 1942; Ripley, Surrey, England
- Died: 18 June 2022 (aged 79); Hawstead, Suffolk, England
- Occupation: Historian

Anne Frances Sutton FSA FRHist (3 November 1942 – 18 June 2022) was a British historian.

== Life and career ==
Anne Frances Sutton was born in Ripley, Surrey on 3 November 1942.

She was a trustee of the Richard III and Yorkist History Trust since its foundation in 1985. Her research focussed on medieval English history, especially Richard III and medieval women. She was elected as a Fellow of the Society of Antiquaries of London in 1984. She was also a Fellow of the Royal Historical Society. From 1979 until her death she was the editor of The Ricardian, the academic journal of the Richard III Society. After graduating from St Hugh's College, Oxford, where she earned her bachelor's degree, she was a professional actress.

Sutton died from cancer at a nursing home in Hawstead, Suffolk, on 18 June 2022, aged 79.

== Selected publications ==
- Sutton, A.F. and Hammond, P.W. 1984. The Coronation of Richard III : the extant documents. St Martin's Press.
- Hammond, P.W. and Sutton, A.F. 1985. Richard III : the road to Bosworth Field. Constable.
- Sutton, A.F. and Visser-Fuchs, L. 1997. Richard III's books : ideals and reality in the life and library of a medieval prince. Sutton Publications.
- Sutton, A.F. 2005. The mercery of London : trade, goods and people, 1130-1578. Routledge.
- Sutton, A.F. and Visser-Fuchs, L. (eds) 2009. The book of privileges of the Merchant Adventurers of England, 1296-1483. Oxford University Press.
- Sutton, A.F. 2016. Wives and widows of medieval London. Shaun Tyas Publishing.
- Sutton, A.F. 2021. The King's Work: The Defence of the North under the Yorkist Kings 1471-85. Shaun Tyas Publishing.
