= Richard III (biography) =

1955 book by Paul Murray Kendall

Richard III is a biography by American historian Paul Murray Kendall about King Richard III of England. The book, published in 1955, has remained the standard popular work on the controversial monarch.

== Contents ==
The book is divided into two major parts, with a prologue, an epilogue and two appendices.

- The prologue describes the situation before Richard's birth, leading up to the Wars of the Roses.
- The first major part deals with Richard's early life as son of Richard, Duke of York and brother to Edward IV. It covers Richard's youth and his life as Duke of Gloucester (13 chapters) as well as his role as "Lord of the North" (6 chapters).
- The second part covers Richard's life after the death of Edward IV in 1483, first as Lord Protector (8 chapters), then as King (12 chapters).
- The epilogue describes the situation after Richard's death at Bosworth, especially what happens to his associates under Henry VII.
- Appendix I deals with the question of the Princes in the Tower, weighing the evidence about their fate. He criticizes traditionalists for ignoring the "disabilities inherent in the 'evidence'" and revisionists for having "put forward a melange of wishful thinking and speculation". Examining the evidence and commenting on several indications of Richard's innocence, he concludes:
  "The most powerful indictment of Richard is the plain and massive fact that the princes disappeared from view after he assumed the throne, and were never reported to have been seen alive. This fact ... weighs heavily against the indications of his innocence.
  ... only positive evidence that someone murdered the princes will tell against this indictment."
  Considering alternative culprits, Kendall discounts claims that Richard's successor Henry VII could have killed the princes after 1485, but makes a case for Richard's temporary ally, the Duke of Buckingham, who could have killed the princes with or without Richard's knowledge and consent.
- Appendix II deals with Richard's posthumous reputation.

== Critical reception ==
The work was critically very well received and was a runner-up for the National Book Award in 1956, also picked one of the best books of the year by the American Library Association.

In the Chicago Tribune, A. L. Rowse called it "The best biography of Richard III that has been written.", whereas Saturday Review's Geoffrey Bruun opined: "A definitive biography of Richard III. It is a noteworthy performance." The Times Literary Supplement wrote: "Brilliantly successful... combines sound scholarship with literary distinction... his descriptions... are always stimulating and sometimes beautiful."

Historical writers Desmond Seward and Alison Weir, both hostile to Richard, disagree; Seward refers to Kendall as Richard III's "romantic apologist", superseded by Charles Ross's 1981 biography. Ross himself both praised and criticised Kendall's work, stating: "Although the author admits that at times he goes beyond the facts and 'reconstructs'..., and in spite of an empurpled prose style which tends to enhance his partisanship, the book is soundly based on a wide range of primary sources, for which it shows a proper respect."

== Release details ==
- Kendall, Paul Murray, Richard III, 1955, London, Allen & Unwin, 514 p., bibliography, maps, genealogy table, ISBN 0-04-942048-8 ISBN 0-04-923035-2 (pbk)
- Kendall, Paul Murray, Richard The Third, 1956, New York, W.W. Norton & Company, 602 pp., bibliography, genealogy, 16 monochrome illustrations, 5 maps, paperback ISBN 0-393-00785-5
- Kendall, Paul Murray, Richard The Third, 1956, New York, W. W. Norton & Company, 602 pages, special printing 1996 Book of the Month Club edition, bibliography, genealogy table, maps, illustrations. (hardback).
- Kendall, Paul Murray, Richard III, 2002, W.W. Norton & Co Ltd, 608 pages, paperback ISBN 0-393-00785-5
