= Cynthia Harrod-Eagles =

British writer

- Born: 13 August 1948 (age 78); Shepherd's Bush, London, England
- Occupation: Novelist
- Spouse: Yes
- Children: 3
- Writing career
- Pen name: Cynthia Harrod-Eagles, Emma Woodhouse, Elizabeth Bennett
- Language: English
- Period: 1972–present
- Genres: Romance, mystery, historical fiction
- Website: www.cynthiaharrodeagles.com

Cynthia Harrod-Eagles (born 13 August 1948) is a British writer of historical, romance and mystery novels. She normally writes under her own name, but has also used the pseudonyms Emma Woodhouse and Elizabeth Bennett. Cynthia was born on 13 August 1948 at Shepherd's Bush, London, England and wrote her first novel in 1972 while still at university.

== Early life and education ==
Cynthia Harrod-Eagles was born in Shepherd's Bush, London, England on 13 August 1948. She was educated at Burlington School, a girls' charity school founded in 1699. She then studied history, philosophy and English at the University of Edinburgh and University College London.

== Career ==
After leaving university, Cynthia had a variety of jobs in the commercial world, beginning as sales manager for The Coca-Cola Company in Edinburgh, and ending as pensions officer for the BBC in London. She started writing at university and, while employed, wrote in the evenings and during the weekends.

The birth of The Morland Dynasty series enabled her to become a full-time writer in 1979. The series was originally intended to comprise 12 volumes, written alternately by two different writers. (This idea almost immediately proved impractical.) As of 2015, when the publisher dropped the series, the number of volumes had reached 35; in November 2022 they commissioned her to write a further volume, published in 2024. She also writes the internationally acclaimed Bill Slider mysteries.

== Personal life ==
Cynthia and her husband still live in London. They have three children. In addition to writing, her interests are horses, wine, architecture, the English countryside, and music: she plays in several amateur orchestras.

== Awards ==
Cynthia wrote her first novel while at university and in 1972 won the Young Writers' Award for The Waiting Game.

In 1993 she won the Romantic Novelists' Association Romantic Novel of the Year Award for Emily, the third volume of her Kirov Saga, a trilogy set in nineteenth-century Russia.

== Bibliography ==
=== As Cynthia Harrod-Eagles ===
==== Single novels ====
- The Waiting Game (1972)
- Shadows on the Mountain (1973)
- Hollow Night (1980)
- Deadfall (1982)
- The Crystal Crown (1983)
- The Orange Tree Plot (1989)
- The Enchanted Isle (1993)
- I, Victoria: The Secret Diary of the Empress Queen.... (1994)
- Play for Love (1995)
- A Cornish Affair (1996)
- Nobody's Fool (1997)
- Dangerous Love (1997)
- Divided Love (1998)
- Keeping Secrets (1998)
- The Longest Dance (2000)
- The Horsemasters (2001)
- Julia (2002)
- The Colonel's Daughter (2005)
- Harte's Desire (2007)
- Country Plot (2012)
- Kate's Progress (2013)

==== The Morland Dynasty ====
The original idea for The Morland Dynasty series was a 'history without tears', fictional characters in a real historical background. The plan was for the whole run of British history from the Middle Ages to the Second World War to be covered in twelve volumes (Harrod-Eagles' initial contract was for just four books). The series now comprises 36 titles.

1. The Founding (1980) Begins 1434 and covers the War of the Roses and Richard III
2. The Dark Rose (1981) Begins 1501 and covers Henry VIII
3. The Princeling (1981) aka The Distant Wood Begins 1558 and covers Elizabeth I and Mary Queen of Scots
4. The Oak Apple (1982) Begins 1630 and covers Charles I and the English Civil War
5. The Black Pearl (1982) Begins 1659 and covers Charles II and the Restoration
6. The Long Shadow (1983) Begins 1670 and covers Charles II and James II
7. The Chevalier (1984) Begins 1689 and covers William III and Mary II, Queen Anne, George I and the Old Pretender (1715 Rebellion)
8. The Maiden (1985) Begins 1720 and covers George I, George II and the Young Pretender (Bonnie Prince Charlie) (1745 Rebellion)
9. The Flood-Tide (1986) Begins 1772 and covers George III, the American War of Independence and Enclosures
10. The Tangled Thread (1987) Begins 1788 and covers the French Revolution and the beginning of the Industrial Revolution
11. The Emperor (1988) Begins 1795 and covers the rise of Napoleon
12. The Victory (1989) Begins 1803 and covers the Regency, Beau Brummell, the Industrial Revolution and the Battle of Trafalgar
13. The Regency (1990) Begins 1807 and covers the Napoleonic Wars, the Peninsular Campaign and the Industrial Revolution
14. The Campaigners (1990) Begins 1815 and covers the Campaign of 100 Days and the Battle of Waterloo
15. The Reckoning (1992) Begins 1816 and covers the post-war slump, Chartism, the Pentrich Revolution and Industrial Progress
16. The Devil's Horse (1993) Begins 1820 and covers George IV, the Factory Age, the Rainhill Trials and the Liverpool and Manchester Railway
17. The Poison Tree (1994) Begins 1831 and covers William IV, the Reform Act 1832 and the Railway Pioneers
18. The Abyss (1995) Begins 1833 and covers William IV, Victoria, the Railway Age and George Hudson
19. The Hidden Shore (1996) Begins 1843 and covers the Early Victorian Age, Philanthropy and Ragged School
20. The Winter Journey (1997) Begins 1851 and covers the Mid-Victorian Age, the Great Exhibition and the Crimean War
21. The Outcast (1998) Begins 1857 and covers the American Civil War, the Divorce Act and the first Underground Railway
22. The Mirage (1999) Begins 1870 and covers the High Victorian Age, the Franco-Prussian War and changes to medical training
23. The Cause (2000) Begins 1874 and covers the High Victorian Age and Women's Rights
24. The Homecoming (2001) Begins 1885 and covers the Late Victorian Age, Oscar Wilde, Prince of Wales' set and Girls Education
25. The Question (2002) Begins 1898 and covers the Late Victorian/Edwardian Age, the automobile, the Boer War and Suffragettes
26. The Dream Kingdom (2003) Begins 1908 and covers the Edwardian Age and Aviation
27. The Restless Sea (2004) Begins 1912 and covers George V, Titanic and the Cat and Mouse Act
28. The White Road (2005) Begins 1914 and covers the beginning of World War I
29. The Burning Roses (2006) Begins 1915 and continues World War I
30. The Measure of Days (2007) Begins 1916 and continues World War I covering the Battle of the Somme
31. The Foreign Field (2008) Begins 1917 and continues World War I covering the Battle of Passchendaele
32. The Fallen Kings (2009) Begins 1918 and covers the end of World War I, the Armistice and demobilisation
33. The Dancing Years (2010) Begins 1919 and continues demobilisation and peace
34. The Winding Road (2011) Begins 1925 and covers the Jazz Age and the Wall Street Crash
35. The Phoenix (2013) Begins 1931 and covers post-Crash depression, Hollywood and the Talkies
36. The Gathering Storm (2024) Begins 1936 and covers the Abdication Crisis, Spanish Civil War and run-up to WW2

==== The Kirov Trilogy ====
1. Anna (1990). Begins in 1803 and covers the Napoleonic invasion of Russia. Shortlisted for the 1991 RNA Novel of the Year.
2. Fleur (1991). Begins in 1851 and covers the Crimean War.
3. Emily (1992). Begins in 1910 and covers World War I and the Russian Revolution. Winner of the 1993 RNA Novel of the Year.

==== Bill Slider Mysteries ====
Cynthia Harrod-Eagles admits the first novel in the Bill Slider series was written for relaxation and was never intended for publication. However it received good reviews, being praised for its "nicely detailed prose" and "approachable characters" (Klett 1992:181) and as a "masterful debut" (Brainard 1992b:51). The reviews for the second novel stated "the author is well on her way to an outstanding series" (The New York Times Marilyn Stasio 21 February 1993), and this proved to be true as, to date, the series consists of 26 novels.

1. Orchestrated Death (1991)
2. Death Watch (1992)
3. Necrochip (1993) aka Death to Go
4. Dead End (1994) aka Grave Music
5. Blood Lines (1996)
6. Killing Time (1996)
7. Shallow Grave (1998)
8. Blood Sinister (1999)
9. Gone Tomorrow (2001)
10. Dear Departed (2004)
11. Game Over (2008)
12. Fell Purpose (2009)
13. Body Line (2011)
14. Kill My Darling (2011)
15. Blood Never Dies (2012)
16. Hard Going (2013)
17. Star Fall (2014)
18. One Under (2015)*
19. Old Bones (2016)
20. Shadow Play (2017)
21. Headlong (2018)
22. Cruel As The Grave (2020)
23. Dying Fall (2021)
24. Before I Sleep (2023)
25. Easeful Death (2025)
26. Deadly Force (2026)

==== War at Home ====
1. Goodbye Piccadilly (2014)
2. Keep the Home Fires Burning (2015)
3. The Land of My Dreams (2016)
4. The Long, Long Trail (2017)
5. Till the Boys Come Home (2018)
6. Pack Up Your Troubles (2019)

==== The Ashmore Castle series ====
1. The Secrets of Ashmore Castle (2021)
2. The Affairs of Ashmore Castle (2022)
3. The Mistress of Ashmore Castle (2023)
4. The Fortunes of Ashmore Castle (2025)
5. Rivals at Ashmore Castle (2026)

=== As Emma Woodhouse ===
==== Single novels ====
- A Well-Painted Passion (1976)
- A Rainbow Summer (1976)
- Romany Magic (1976)
- Love's Perilous Passage (1978)
- Never Love a Stranger (1978)
- On Wings of Love (1978)

=== As Elizabeth Bennett ===
==== Single novels ====
- Title Role (1980)
- The Unfinished (1983)
- Last Run (1984)
- Even Chance (1984)
