= John Ashdown-Hill =

English medieval historian

John Ashdown-Hill MBE
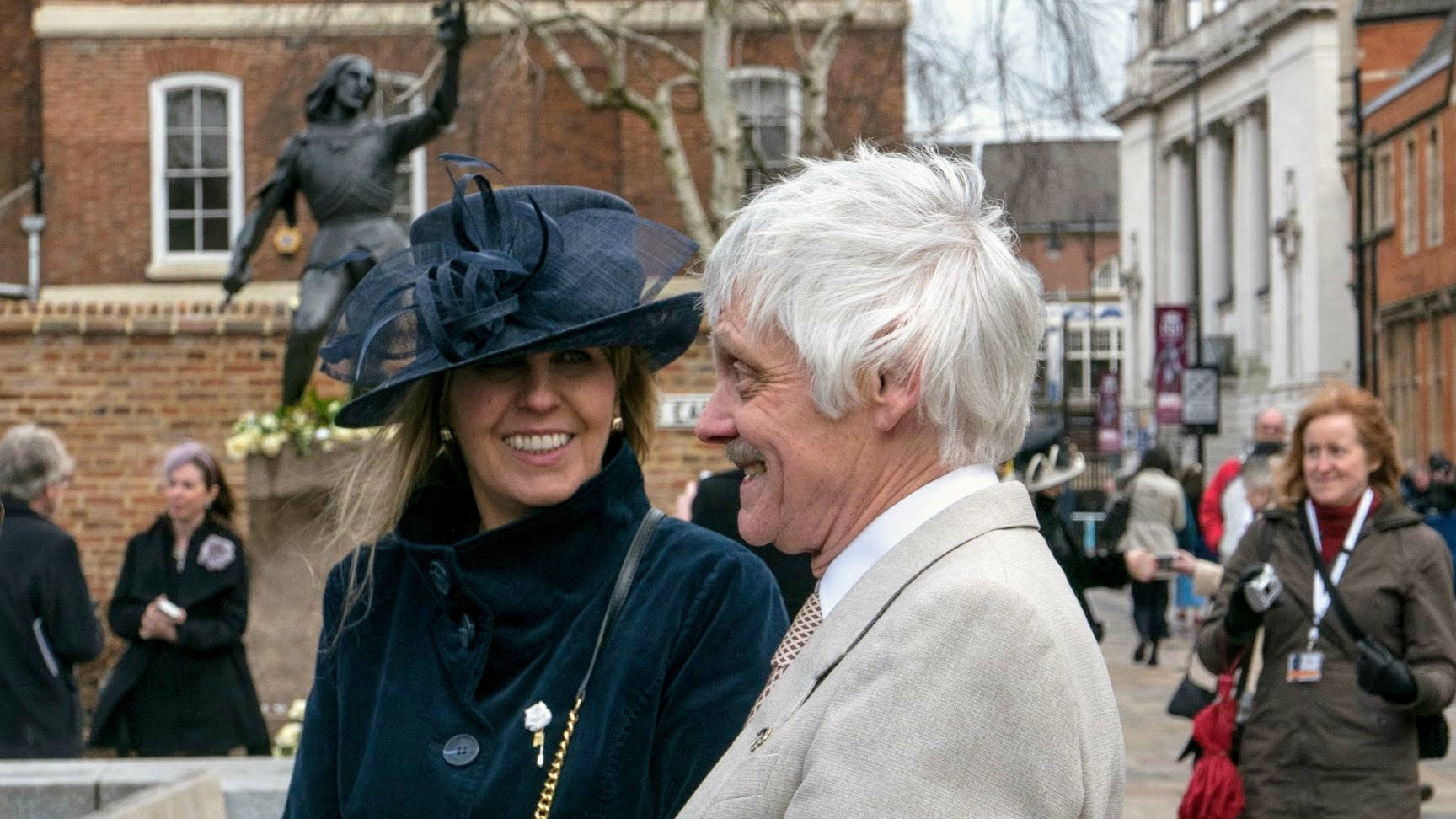
- John Ashdown-Hill in March 2015
- Born: 5 April 1949; London, United Kingdom
- Died: 18 May 2018 (aged 69)
- Education: East Anglia Polytechnic, University of Essex
- Occupations: Author, historian, speaker
- Children: 1 son
- Writing career
- Language: English
- Genre: History
- Notable works: Eleanor the Secret Queen; Mediaeval Colchester’s Lost Landmarks; Richard III’s "Beloved Cousyn" – John Howard and the House of York; The Last Days of Richard III and the Fate of his DNA; Royal Marriage Secrets; The Third Plantagenet
- Website: www.johnashdownhill.com

Louis John Frederick Ashdown-Hill MBE FSA (5 April 1949 – 18 May 2018), commonly known as John Ashdown-Hill, was an independent historian and author of books on late medieval English history with a focus on the House of York and Richard III. Ashdown-Hill died on 18 May 2018; after living with motor neurone disease for some time.

== Education ==
=== University and polytechnic ===
- HNC in History and French from Anglia Polytechnic
- MA in linguistics from the University of Essex
- PhD in medieval history from the University of Essex
- Granted an honorary second doctorate from the University of Essex in July 2014, to acknowledge his key work both in local history and in the discovery of the remains of Richard III.

== Early career ==
Ashdown-Hill taught languages including English, French, Spanish, Italian and modern Greek and also Classical civilisation in the UK, in Tunisia, in Spain and in Turkey, but eventually gave up teaching to focus on his historical research.

== Career ==
In 2003, Ashdown-Hill was asked by colleagues in Belgium to seek the mitochondrial DNA (mtDNA) sequence shared by Richard III of England and his brothers and sisters as one of them, Margaret of York, had died and was buried in Mechelen in what is now Belgium. He spent a year tracing an all-female line of descent from Richard III's eldest sister, Anne, to Joy Ibsen, a woman living in Canada. In 2005 he announced the discovery of the Mitochondrial DNA sequence of Richard III and his siblings, and in 2006 he gave a presentation on the subject of his DNA research to the Richard III Society in London, in the presence of Prince Richard, Duke of Gloucester.

In 2004, Ashdown-Hill was commissioned by the BBC to research a story that Richard III's remains had been thrown into the River Soar in Leicester. He concluded that the story was untrue.

In 2009, Philippa Langley invited Ashdown-Hill to lead a study day for the Scottish Branch of the Richard III Society, as a result of which the Looking for Richard project was formally founded at the Crammond Inn, Edinburgh.

In August 2012, after three years of work persuading the authorities in Leicester, the search for the lost remains of Richard III began with the excavation of the Social Services Department car park. On the first day of the dig (25 August 2012) bones which proved to be those of Richard III were found in the area predicted by Ashdown-Hill and Langley and several earlier researchers, such as David Baldwin. Subsequent DNA research and analysis by Turi King and her colleagues proved that the mtDNA of the bones matched the sequence from Richard III's mother's female descendants that Ashdown-Hill had identified in 2004.

On 5 September 2012, Ashdown-Hill had the honour of carrying the remains from the car park. He covered the box of bones with his modern copy of the House of Plantagenet Royal Standard.

In May 2014, Ashdown-Hill's key role in the finding of Richard III's remains was formally acknowledged by Heather Hallett and her colleagues in the High Court Judgement regarding the reburial of the king's remains.

Ashdown-Hill was awarded an MBE in the 2015 Queen's Birthday Honours for "services to historical research and the exhumation and identification of Richard III".

Ashdown-Hill died on 18 May 2018, after living with motor neurone disease for some time.

== Other historical research ==
John Ashdown-Hill also carried out innovative research on the Plantagenet Y-chromosome, and on the mtDNA sequence of the Princes in the Tower. (as published in The Mythology of the "Princes" in the Tower, p. 205)

== In film ==
- Ashdown-Hill is played by James Fleet in the 2022 film, The Lost King, about the dramatisation of the search for the remains of Richard III.

== Bibliography ==
- Ashdown-Hill, John (2009). Mediaeval Colchester's Lost Landmarks. Breedon Books Pub. ISBN 978-1-85983-686-6.
- Ashdown-Hill, John (2009). Eleanor: The Secret Queen : the Woman who Put Richard III on the Throne. History Press. ISBN 978-0-7524-4866-4.
- Ashdown-Hill, John (2009). Richard III's 'beloved Cousyn': John Howard and the House of York. History Press. ISBN 978-0-7524-5131-2.
- The Last Days of Richard III (and the Fate of His DNA) (first published 2010, fully revised and updated edition 2013)
- Royal Marriage Secrets: Consorts and Concubines, Bigamists and Bastards (2013)
- The Third Plantagenet: George, Duke of Clarence, Richard III's Brother (2014)
- The Dublin King: The True Story of Lambert Simnel and the Princes in the Tower (2015) ISBN 9780750960342
- The Mythology of Richard III (2015)
- The Wars of the Roses (2015)
- The Private Life of Edward IV (2016)
- Cecily Neville: Mother of Richard III (2018) ISBN 9781526706324
- The Poetry Of John Ashdown-Hill (2018) C S Hughes, ed. ISBN 9780994517586
- The Mythology of the "Princes in the Tower" (2018)
- Elizabeth Widville, Lady Grey: Edward IV's Chief Mistress and the 'Pink Queen' (2019)

=== Contributor ===
- Ashdown-Hill, John; David Johnson; Wendy Johnson; P. J. Langley (2014). Carson, Annette (ed.). Finding Richard III: The Official Account of Research by the Retrieval & Reburial Project. Horstead: Imprimis Imprimatur. ISBN 978-0-9576840-2-7.
