= Richard III of England =

King of England from 1483 to 1485

Richard III
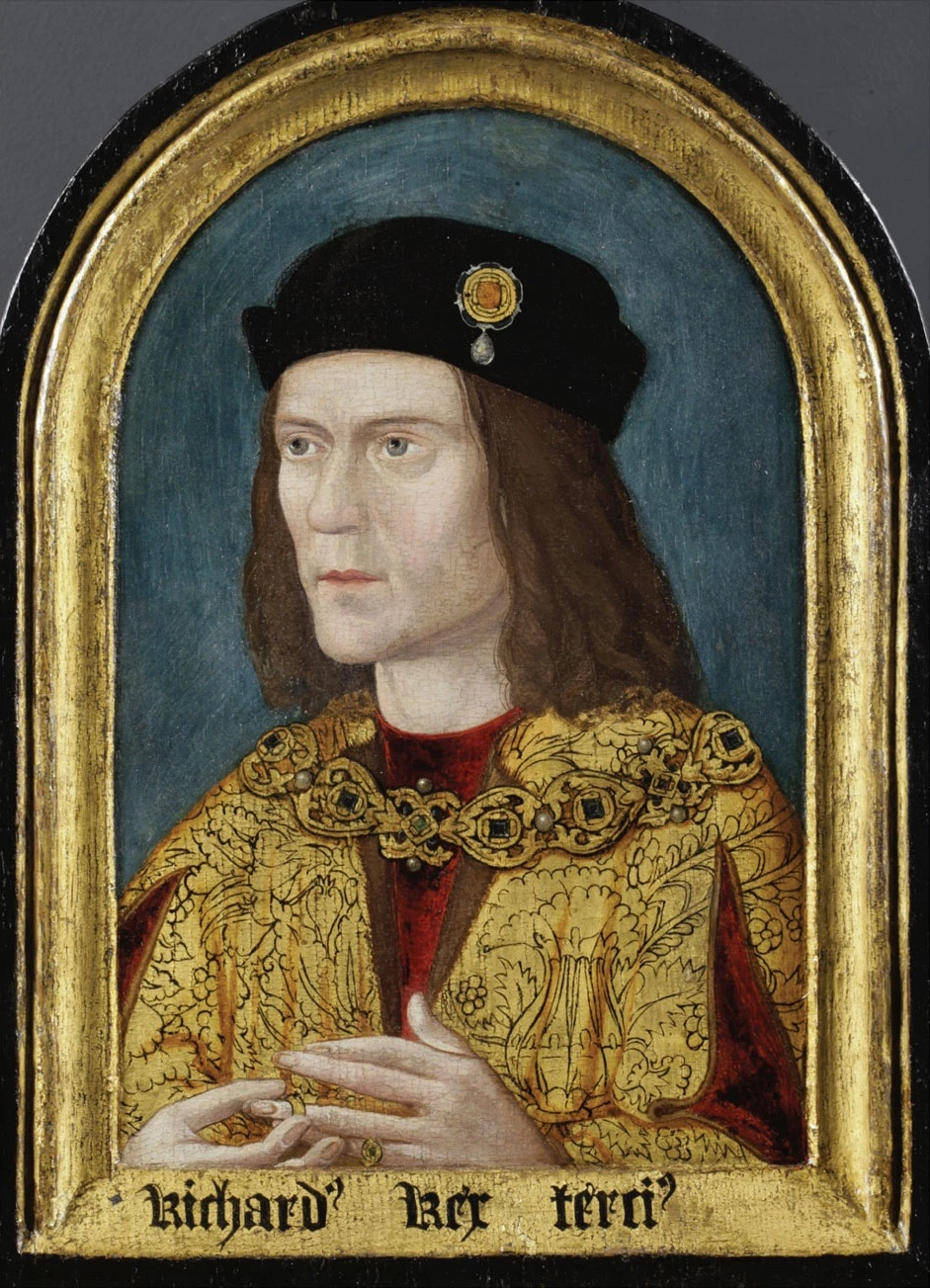
- Posthumous portrait (presumably) based on contemporary original, 16th century, Society of Antiquaries of London

King of England
- Reign: 26 June 1483 – 22 August 1485
- Coronation: 6 July 1483
- Predecessor: Edward V
- Successor: Henry VII
- Born: 2 October 1452; Fotheringhay Castle, Northamptonshire, England
- Died: 22 August 1485 (aged 32); Bosworth Field, Leicestershire, England
- Burial: 25 August 1485 Greyfriars, Leicester 26 March 2015 Leicester Cathedral
- Spouse: Anne Neville (m. 1472; died 1485)
- Issue Detail: Edward, Prince of Wales; John of Gloucester (ill.); Katherine, Countess of Pembroke (ill.)
- House: York
- Father: Richard of York, 3rd Duke of York
- Mother: Cecily Neville

Richard III (2 October 1452 – 22 August 1485) was King of England from 26 June 1483 until his death in 1485. He was the last king of the Plantagenet dynasty and its cadet branch, the House of York; the former had ruled England since 1154. His defeat and death at the Battle of Bosworth Field marked the end of the Middle Ages in England.

Richard was created Duke of Gloucester in 1461 after the accession to the throne of his older brother Edward IV. This was during the period known as the Wars of the Roses, an era when two branches of the royal family contested the throne; Edward and Richard were Yorkists, and their side of the family were in conflict with their Lancastrian relatives. In 1472, Richard married his cousin, Anne Neville, daughter of Richard Neville, 16th Earl of Warwick, and widow of Edward of Lancaster, son of Henry VI, a Lancastrian. He governed northern England during Edward's reign, and played a role in the invasion of Scotland in 1482. When Edward IV died in April 1483, Richard was named Lord Protector of the realm for Edward's eldest son and successor, the 12-year-old Edward V. Before arrangements were complete for Edward V's coronation, scheduled for 22 June 1483, the marriage of his parents was declared bigamous and therefore invalid. Now officially illegitimate, Edward and his siblings were barred from inheriting the throne. On 25 June, an assembly of lords and commoners endorsed a declaration to this effect, and proclaimed Richard as the rightful king. He was crowned on 6 July 1483. Edward and his younger brother Richard of Shrewsbury, Duke of York, called the "Princes in the Tower", disappeared from the Tower of London around August 1483.

There were two major rebellions against Richard during his reign. In October 1483, an unsuccessful revolt was led by staunch allies of Edward IV and Richard's former ally, Henry Stafford, 2nd Duke of Buckingham. Then, in August 1485, Henry Tudor and his uncle, Jasper Tudor, landed in Wales with a contingent of French troops, and marched through Pembrokeshire, recruiting soldiers. Henry's forces defeated Richard's army near the Leicestershire town of Market Bosworth. Richard was slain, making him the last English king to die in battle. Henry Tudor then ascended the throne as Henry VII.

Richard's corpse was taken to the nearby town of Leicester and buried without ceremony. His original tomb monument is believed to have been removed during the English Reformation, and his remains were wrongly thought to have been thrown into the River Soar. In 2012, an archaeological excavation was commissioned by Ricardian author Philippa Langley with the assistance of the Richard III Society on the site previously occupied by Grey Friars Priory. The University of Leicester identified the human skeleton found at the site as that of Richard III as a result of radiocarbon dating, comparison with contemporary reports of his appearance, identification of trauma sustained at Bosworth and comparison of his mitochondrial DNA with that of two matrilineal descendants of his sister Anne. He was reburied in Leicester Cathedral in 2015.

== Early life ==
Richard was born on 2 October 1452 at Fotheringhay Castle in Northamptonshire, the eleventh of the twelve children of Richard, 3rd Duke of York, and Cecily Neville, and the youngest to survive infancy. His early years unfolded against the opening phase of what has traditionally been termed the Wars of the Roses, a prolonged period of political instability and intermittent civil conflict in England during the latter half of the fifteenth century. On one side were the Yorkists, who supported Richard's father – a potential claimant to the throne of King Henry VI from birth and a leading opponent of Henry's regime – and on the other, the Lancastrians, who remained loyal to the crown.

In 1459, his father and the Yorkists were forced to flee England, whereupon Richard and his older brother George were placed in the custody of their aunt Anne Neville, Duchess of Buckingham, and possibly of Cardinal Thomas Bourchier, Archbishop of Canterbury.

When their father and elder brother Edmund, Earl of Rutland, were killed at the Battle of Wakefield on 30 December 1460, Richard and George were sent by their mother to the Low Countries. They returned to England following the defeat of the Lancastrians at the Battle of Towton. They participated in the coronation of their eldest brother as King Edward IV on 28 June 1461, when Richard was named Duke of Gloucester and made both a Knight of the Garter and a Knight of the Bath. Edward appointed him the sole Commissioner of Array for the Western Counties in 1464 when he was 11. By the age of 17, he had an independent command.

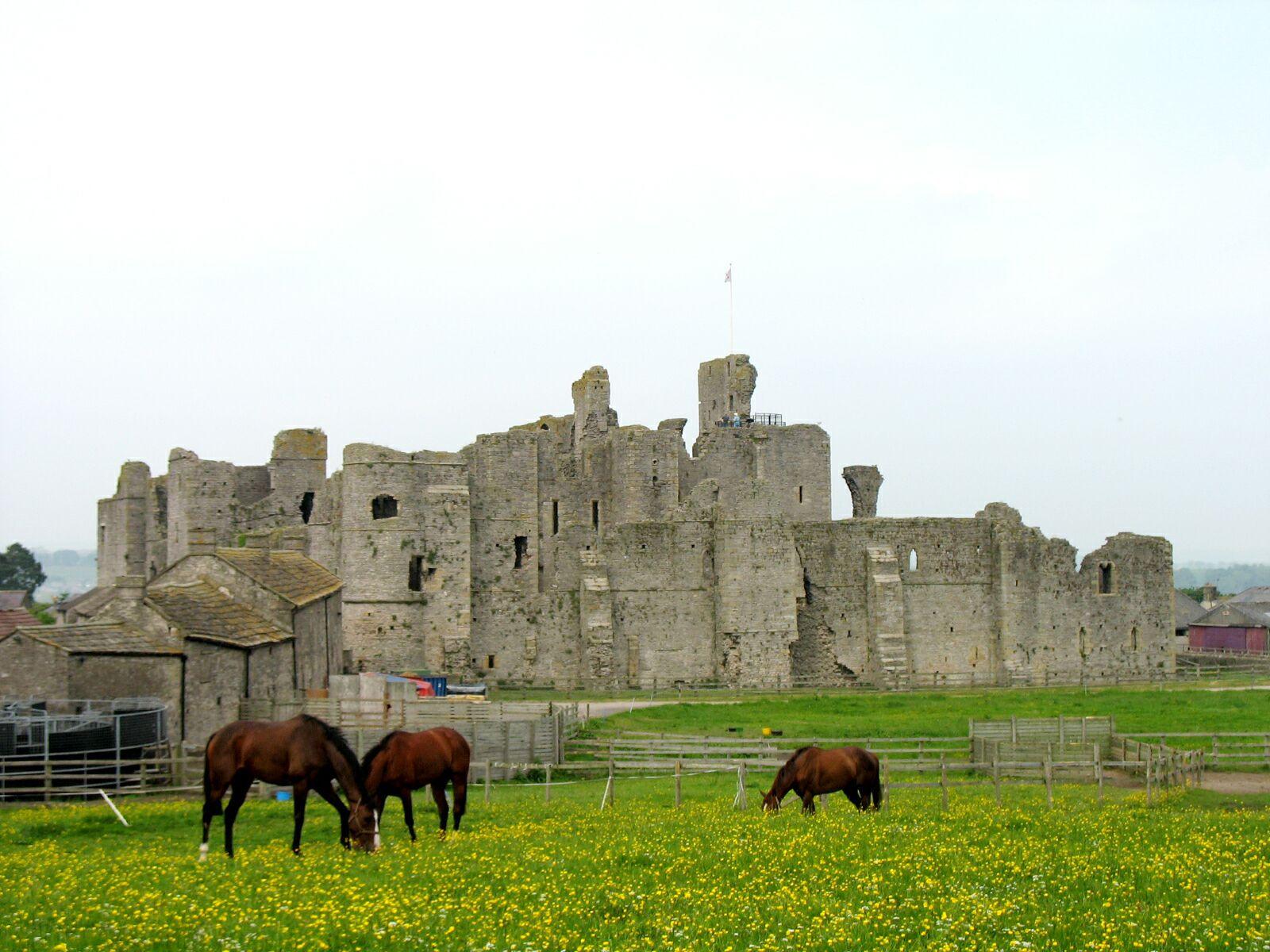
The ruins of the twelfth-century castle at Middleham in Wensleydale, North Yorkshire, where Richard was raised

Richard spent several years during his childhood at Middleham Castle in Wensleydale, Yorkshire, under the tutelage of his cousin Richard Neville, 16th Earl of Warwick, later known as 'the Kingmaker' because of his role in the Wars of the Roses. Warwick supervised Richard's training as a knight; in the autumn of 1465, Edward IV granted Warwick £1,000 for the expenses of his younger brother's tutelage. With some interruptions, Richard stayed at Middleham either from late 1461 until early 1465, when he was 12 or from 1465 until his coming of age in 1468, when he turned 16. (Note: "From November 1461 until 1465 all references to Richard place him in locations south of the river Trent. It may have been partly to appease Warwick's injured feelings towards the rising influence of the king's new Woodville in-laws that he was given the honour of taking Richard into his household to complete his education, probably at some time in 1465".) While at Warwick's estate, it is likely that he met both Francis Lovell, who was his firm supporter later in his life, and Warwick's younger daughter, his future wife Anne Neville.

It is possible that even at this early stage Warwick was considering the king's brothers as strategic matches for his daughters, Isabel and Anne: young aristocrats were often sent to be raised in the households of their intended future partners, as had been the case for the young dukes' father, Richard of York. As the relationship between the king and Warwick became strained, Edward IV opposed the match. During Warwick's lifetime, George was the only royal brother to marry one of his daughters, the elder, Isabel, on 12 July 1469, without the king's permission. George joined his father-in-law's revolt against the king, while Richard remained loyal to Edward, even though he was rumoured to have been having an affair with Anne. (Note: As late as 1469 rumours were still linking Richard's name with Anne Neville's. In August of that year, by which time Clarence had married Isabel, an Italian observer in London mistakenly reported that Warwick had married his two daughters to the king's brothers (Cal. Milanese Papers, I, pp. 118–120).)

Richard and Edward were forced to flee to Burgundy in October 1470 after Warwick defected to the side of the former Lancastrian queen Margaret of Anjou. In 1468, Richard's sister Margaret had married Charles the Bold, the Duke of Burgundy, and the brothers could expect a welcome there. Edward was restored to the throne in the spring of 1471, following the battles of Barnet and Tewkesbury, in both of which the 18-year-old Richard played a crucial role.

During his adolescence, and due to a cause that is unknown, Richard developed scoliosis, a sideways curvature of the spine. In 2014, after the discovery of Richard's remains, the osteoarchaeologist Dr. Jo Appleby, of Leicester University's School of Archaeology and Ancient History, imaged the spinal column, and reconstructed a model using 3D printing, and concluded that though the spinal scoliosis looked dramatic, it probably did not cause any major physical deformity that could not be disguised by clothing.

== Marriage and family relationships ==
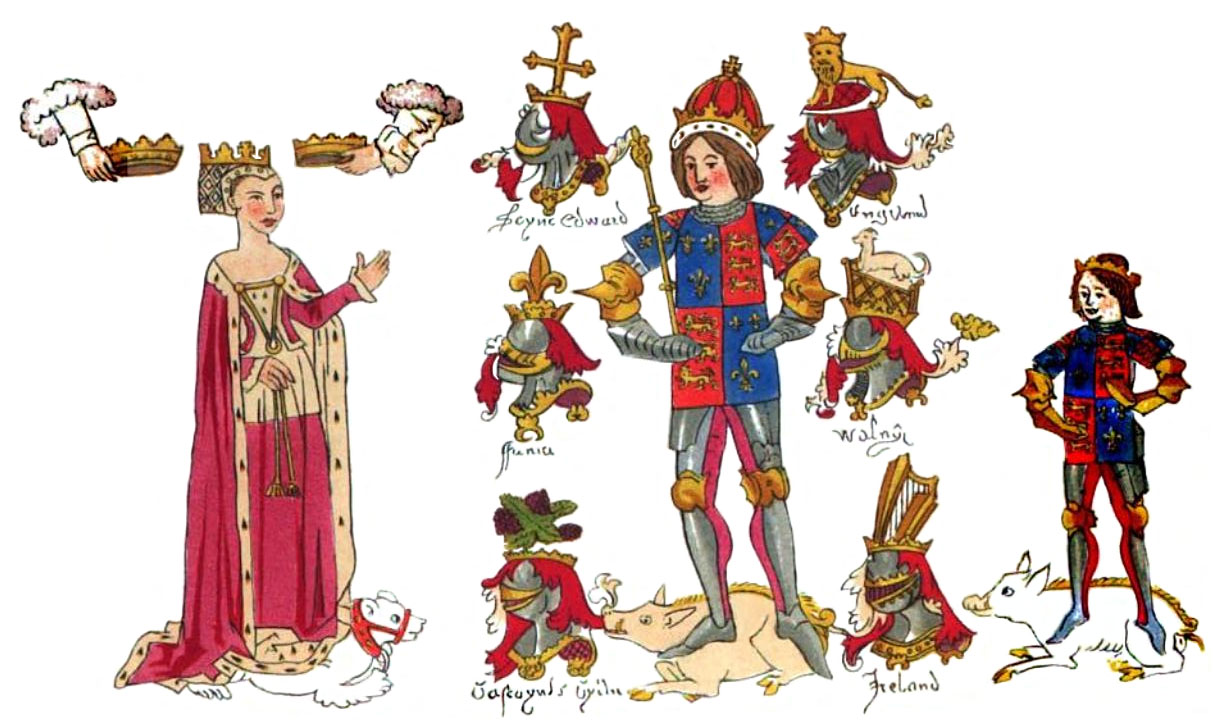
Contemporary illumination (Rous Roll, 1483) of Richard, his wife Anne Neville, and their son Edward

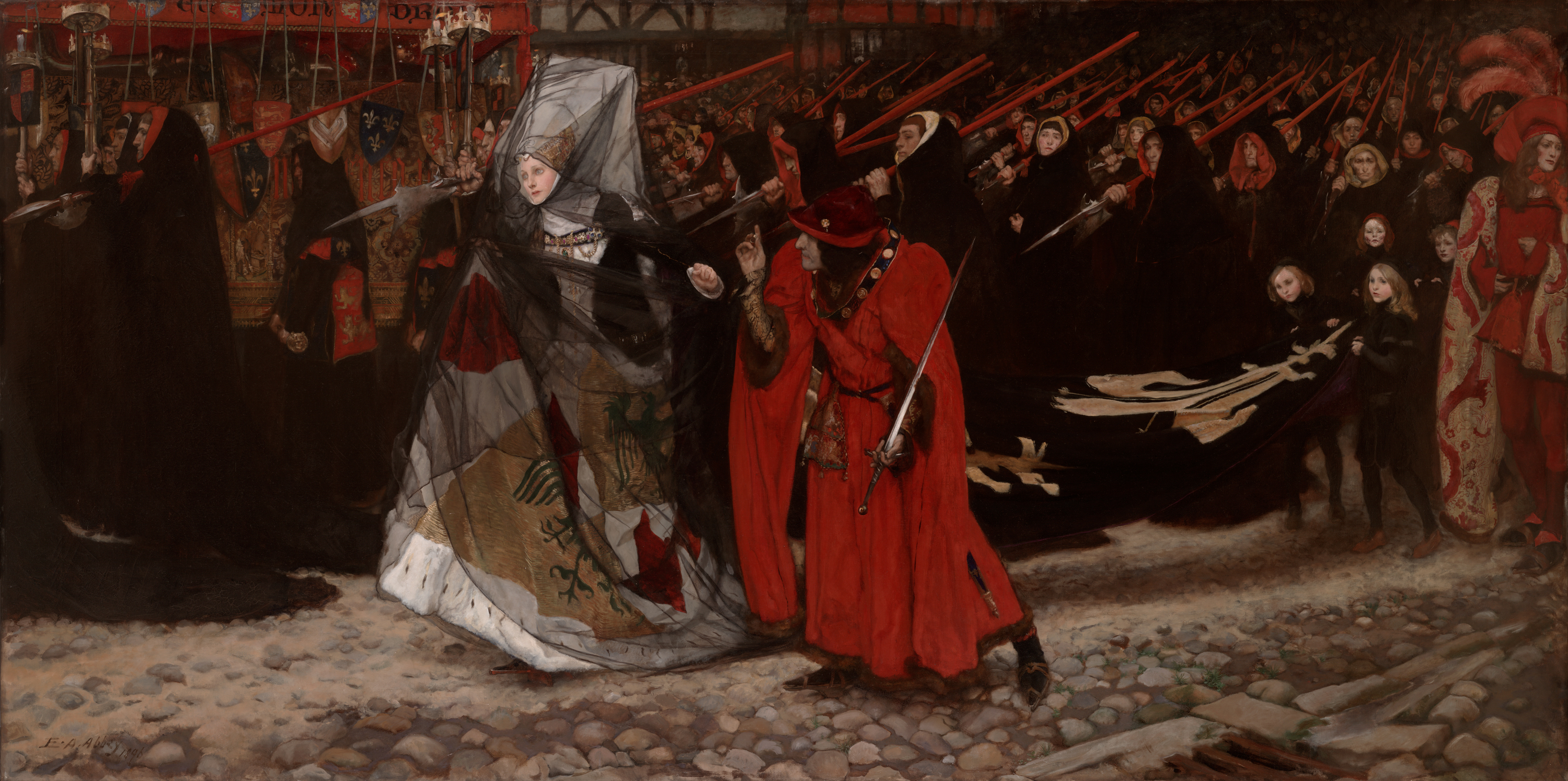
Imaginary depiction of Richard and his wife Anne by Edwin Austin Abbey, 1890

Following a decisive Yorkist victory over the Lancastrians at the Battle of Tewkesbury, Richard married Anne Neville on 12 July 1472. Anne had previously been wedded to Edward of Westminster, only son of Henry VI, to seal her father's allegiance to the Lancastrian party. Edward died at the Battle of Tewkesbury on 4 May 1471, while Warwick had died at the Battle of Barnet on 14 April 1471. Richard's marriage plans brought him into conflict with his brother George. John Paston's letter of 17 February 1472 makes it clear that George was not happy about the marriage but grudgingly accepted it on the basis that "he may well have my Lady his sister-in-law, but they shall part no livelihood". The reason was the inheritance Anne shared with her elder sister Isabel, whom George had married in 1469. It was not only the earldom that was at stake; Richard Neville had inherited it as a result of his marriage to Anne Beauchamp, 16th Countess of Warwick. The Countess, who was still alive, was technically the owner of the substantial Beauchamp estates, her father having left no male heirs.

The Croyland Chronicle records that Richard agreed to a prenuptial contract in the following terms: "the marriage of the Duke of Gloucester with Anne before-named was to take place, and he was to have such and so much of the earl's lands as should be agreed upon between them through the mediation of arbitrators; while all the rest were to remain in the possession of the Duke of Clarence". The date of Paston's letter suggests the marriage was still being negotiated in February 1472. In order to win George's final consent to the marriage, Richard renounced most of the Earl of Warwick's land and property including the earldoms of Warwick (which the Kingmaker had held in his wife's right) and Salisbury and surrendered to George the office of Great Chamberlain of England. Richard retained Neville's forfeit estates he had already been granted in the summer of 1471: Penrith, Sheriff Hutton and Middleham, where he later established his marital household.

Stained glass depiction of Richard and Anne Neville in Cardiff Castle

The requisite papal dispensation was obtained dated 22 April 1472. Michael Hicks has suggested that the terms of the dispensation deliberately understated the degrees of consanguinity between the couple, and the marriage was therefore illegal on the ground of first-degree consanguinity following George's marriage to Anne's sister Isabel. However, the first-degree consanguinity would have been only if Richard had sought to marry Isabel (in case of widowhood) after she had married his brother George, but no such consanguinity applied for Anne and Richard. Richard's marriage to Anne was never declared null, and it was public to everyone including secular and canon lawyers for 13 years.

In June 1473, Richard persuaded his mother-in-law to leave the sanctuary and come to live under his protection at Middleham. Later in the year, under the terms of the 1473 Act of Resumption, George lost some of the property he held under royal grant and made no secret of his displeasure. John Paston's letter of November 1473 says that King Edward planned to put both his younger brothers in their place by acting as "a stifler atween them". Early in 1474, Parliament assembled and Edward attempted to reconcile his brothers by stating that both men, and their wives, would enjoy the Warwick inheritance just as if the Countess of Warwick "was naturally dead". The doubts cast by George on the validity of Richard and Anne's marriage were addressed by a clause protecting their rights in the event they were divorced (i.e. of their marriage being declared null and void by the Church) and then legally remarried to each other, and also protected Richard's rights while waiting for such a valid second marriage with Anne. The following year, Richard was rewarded with all the Neville lands in the north of England, at the expense of Anne's cousin, George Neville, 1st Duke of Bedford. From this point, George seems to have fallen steadily out of King Edward's favour, his discontent coming to a head in 1477 when, following Isabel's death, he was denied the opportunity to marry Mary of Burgundy, the stepdaughter of his sister Margaret, even though Margaret approved the proposed match. There is no evidence of Richard's involvement in George's subsequent conviction and execution on a charge of treason.

== Reign of Edward IV ==
=== Estates and titles ===
Richard was granted the Dukedom of Gloucester on 1 November 1461, and on 12 August the next year was awarded large estates in northern England, including the lordships of Richmond in Yorkshire, and Pembroke in Wales. He gained the forfeited lands of the Lancastrian John de Vere, 12th Earl of Oxford, in East Anglia. In 1462, on his birthday, he was made Constable of Gloucester and Corfe Castles and Admiral of England, Ireland and Aquitaine and appointed Governor of the North, becoming the richest and most powerful noble in England. On 17 October 1469, he was made Constable of England. In November, he replaced William Hastings, 1st Baron Hastings, as Chief Justice of North Wales. The following year, he was appointed Chief Steward and Chamberlain of Wales. On 18 May 1471, Richard was named Great Chamberlain and Lord High Admiral of England. Other positions followed: High Sheriff of Cumberland for life, Lieutenant of the North and Commander-in-Chief against the Scots and hereditary Warden of the West March. Two months later, on 14 July, he gained the Lordships of the strongholds Sheriff Hutton and Middleham in Yorkshire and Penrith in Cumberland, which had belonged to Warwick the Kingmaker. It is possible that the grant of Middleham seconded Richard's personal wishes. (Note: Says Kendall, "Richard had won his way back to Middleham Castle". However, any personal attachment he may have felt to Middleham was likely mitigated in his adulthood, as surviving records demonstrate he spent less time there than at Barnard Castle and Pontefract." "No great magnate or royal duke in the fifteenth century had a 'home' in the twentieth-century sense of the word. Richard of Gloucester formed no more of a personal attachment to Middleham than he did to Barnard Castle or Pontefract, at both of which surviving records suggest he spent more time.")

=== Exile and return ===
During the latter part of Edward IV's reign, Richard demonstrated his loyalty to the king, in contrast to their brother George who had allied himself with the Earl of Warwick when the latter rebelled towards the end of the 1460s. Following Warwick's 1470 rebellion, before which he had made peace with Margaret of Anjou and promised the restoration of Henry VI to the English throne, Richard, the Baron Hastings and Anthony Woodville, 2nd Earl Rivers, escaped capture at Doncaster by Warwick's brother, John Neville, 1st Marquess of Montagu. On 2 October they sailed from King's Lynn in two ships; Edward landed at Marsdiep and Richard at Zeeland. It was said that, having left England in such haste as to possess almost nothing, Edward was forced to pay their passage with his fur cloak; certainly, Richard borrowed three pounds from Zeeland's town bailiff. They were attainted by Warwick's only Parliament on 26 November. They resided in Bruges with Louis de Gruthuse, who had been the Burgundian Ambassador to Edward's court, but it was not until Louis XI of France declared war on Burgundy that Charles, Duke of Burgundy, assisted their return, providing, along with the Hanseatic merchants, 20,000 pounds, 36 ships and 1,200 men. They left Flushing for England on 11 March 1471. Warwick's arrest of local sympathisers prevented them from landing in Yorkist East Anglia and on 14 March, after being separated in a storm, their ships ran ashore at Holderness. The town of Hull refused Edward entry. He gained entry to York by using the same claim as Henry of Bolingbroke had before deposing Richard II in 1399; that is, that he was merely reclaiming the Dukedom of York rather than the crown. It was in Edward's attempt to regain his throne that Richard began to demonstrate his skill as a military commander.

=== 1471 military campaign ===
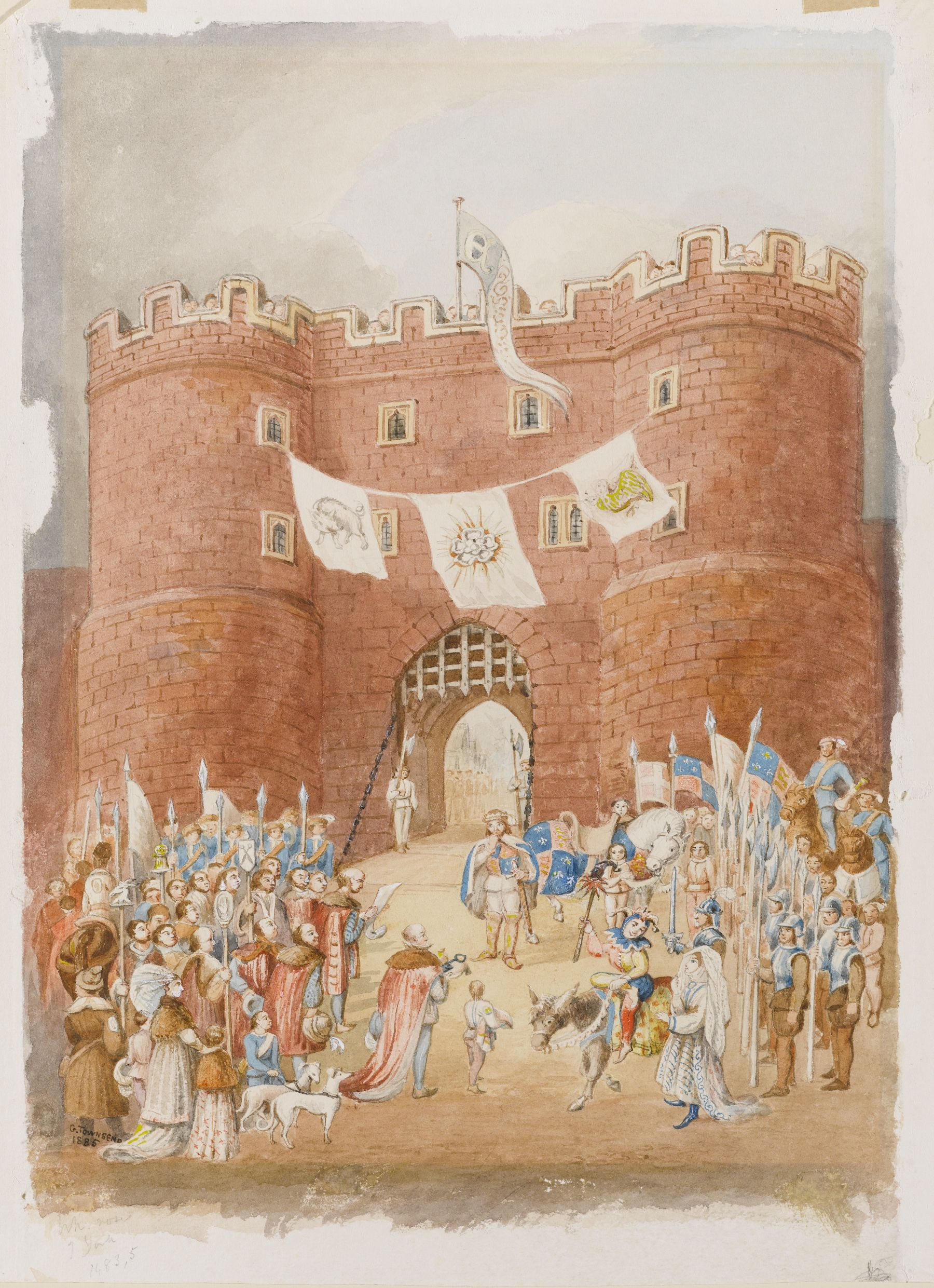
Imaginary depiction of the East Gate (since demolished) in Exeter and the Visit of King Richard III, painted in 1885

Once Edward had regained the support of his brother George, he mounted a swift and decisive campaign to regain the crown through combat; it is believed that Richard was his principal lieutenant as some of the king's earliest support came from members of Richard's affinity, including Sir James Harrington and Sir William Parr, who brought 600 men-at-arms to them at Doncaster. Richard may have led the vanguard at the Battle of Barnet, in his first command, on 14 April 1471, where he outflanked the wing of Henry Holland, 3rd Duke of Exeter, although the degree to which his command was fundamental may have been exaggerated. That Richard's personal household sustained losses indicate he was in the thick of the fighting. A contemporary source is clear about his holding the vanguard for Edward at Tewkesbury, deployed against the Lancastrian vanguard under Edmund Beaufort, 4th Duke of Somerset, on 4 May 1471, and his role two days later, as Constable of England, sitting alongside John Howard as Earl Marshal, in the trial and sentencing of leading Lancastrians captured after the battle.

=== 1475 invasion of France ===
At least in part resentful of King Louis XI's previous support of his Lancastrian opponents, and possibly in support of his brother-in-law Charles the Bold, Duke of Burgundy, Edward went to parliament in October 1472 for funding a military campaign, and eventually landed in Calais on 4 July 1475. Richard's was the largest private contingent of his army. Although well known to have publicly been against the eventual treaty signed with Louis XI at Picquigny (and absent from the negotiations, in which one of his rank would have been expected to take a leading role), he acted as Edward's witness when the king instructed his delegates to the French court, and received 'some very fine presents' from Louis on a visit to the French king at Amiens. In refusing other gifts, which included 'pensions' in the guise of 'tribute', he was joined only by Cardinal Bourchier. He supposedly disapproved of Edward's policy of personally benefiting—politically and financially—from a campaign paid for out of a parliamentary grant, and hence out of public funds. Any military prowess was therefore not to be revealed further until the last years of Edward's reign.

=== The North, and the Council in the North ===
Richard was the dominant magnate in the north of England until Edward IV's death. There, and especially in the city of York, he was highly regarded; although it has been questioned whether this view was reciprocated by Richard. (Note: Hanham has raised "the charge of hypocrisy", suggesting "that Richard would 'grin' at the city", and questioning whether he was either as popular or as devoted to the region as sometimes thought.) Edward IV delegated significant authority to Richard in the region. Paul Murray Kendall and later historians have suggested that this was with the intention of making Richard the Lord of the North; Peter Booth, however, has argued that "instead of allowing his brother Richard carte blanche, [Edward] restricted his influence by using his own agent, Sir William Parr." Following Richard's accession to the throne, he first established the Council of the North and made his nephew John de la Pole, 1st Earl of Lincoln, president and formally institutionalised this body as an offshoot of the royal Council; all its letters and judgements were issued on behalf of the king and in his name. The council had a budget of 2,000 marks per annum and had issued "Regulations" by July of that year: councillors to act impartially, declare vested interests and to meet at least every three months. Its main focus of operations was Yorkshire and the north-east and its responsibilities included land disputes, keeping of the king's peace and punishing lawbreakers.

=== War with Scotland ===
Richard's increasing role in the north from the mid-1470s to some extent explains his withdrawal from the royal court. He had been Warden of the West March on the Scottish border since 10 September 1470, and again from May 1471; he used Penrith as a base while 'taking effectual measures' against the Scots, and 'enjoyed the revenues of the estates' of the Forest of Cumberland while doing so. It was at the same time that the Duke of Gloucester was appointed High Sheriff of Cumberland for five consecutive years, being described as 'of Penrith Castle' in 1478.

By 1480, war with Scotland was looming; on 12 May that year, he was appointed Lieutenant-General of the North (a position created for the occasion) as fears of a Scottish invasion grew. Louis XI of France had attempted to negotiate a military alliance with Scotland (in the tradition of the "Auld Alliance"), with the aim of attacking England, according to a contemporary French chronicler. Richard had the authority to summon the Border Levies and issue Commissions of Array to repel the Border raids. Together with the Earl of Northumberland, he launched counter-raids, and when the king and council formally declared war in November 1480, he was granted 10,000 pounds for wages.

The king failed to arrive to lead the English army and the result was intermittent skirmishing until early 1482. Richard witnessed the treaty with Alexander, Duke of Albany, brother of King James III of Scotland. Northumberland, Stanley, Dorset, Sir Edward Woodville, and Richard with approximately 20,000 men took the town of Berwick as part of the English invasion of Scotland. The castle held out until 24 August 1482, when Richard recaptured Berwick-upon-Tweed from the Kingdom of Scotland. Although it is debatable whether the English victory was due more to internal Scottish divisions rather than any outstanding military prowess by Richard, it was the last time that the Royal Burgh of Berwick changed hands between the two realms.

== Lord Protector ==
On the death of Edward IV on 9 April 1483, his 12-year-old son, Edward V, succeeded him, with Richard being named Lord Protector of the Realm. At Baron Hastings' urging, Richard left his base in Yorkshire for London in order to assume his role. On 29 April, as previously agreed, Richard and his cousin, Henry Stafford, 2nd Duke of Buckingham, met Queen Elizabeth's brother Anthony Woodville, 2nd Earl Rivers, at Northampton. At the queen's request, Earl Rivers was escorting the young king to London with an armed escort of 2,000 men, while Richard and Buckingham's joint escort was 600 men. Edward V had been sent further south to Stony Stratford. At first convivial, Richard had Earl Rivers, his nephew Richard Grey and his associate, Thomas Vaughan, arrested. They were taken to Pontefract Castle, where they were executed on 25 June on the charge of treason against the Lord Protector after appearing before a tribunal led by Henry Percy, 4th Earl of Northumberland. Rivers had appointed Richard as executor of his will.

After having Rivers arrested, Richard and Buckingham moved to Stony Stratford, where Richard informed Edward V of a plot aimed at denying him his role as protector and whose perpetrators had been dealt with. He proceeded to escort the king to London. They entered the city on 4 May, displaying the carriages of weapons Rivers had taken with his 2,000-man army. Richard first accommodated Edward in the Bishop's apartments; then, on Buckingham's suggestion, the king was moved to the royal apartments of the Tower of London, where kings customarily awaited their coronation. Within the year 1483, Richard had moved himself to the grandeur of Crosby Hall, London, then in Bishopsgate in the City of London. Robert Fabyan, in his 'The new chronicles of England and of France', writes that "the Duke caused the King (Edward V) to be removed unto the Tower and his broder with hym, and the Duke lodged himselfe in Crosbyes Place in Bisshoppesgate Strete." In Holinshed's Chronicles of England, Scotland, and Ireland, he accounts that "little by little all folke withdrew from the Tower, and drew unto Crosbies in Bishops gates Street, where the Protector kept his houshold. The Protector had the resort; the King in maner desolate."

On hearing the news of her brother's 30 April arrest, the dowager queen fled to sanctuary in Westminster Abbey. Joining her were her son by her first marriage, Thomas Grey, 1st Marquess of Dorset; her five daughters; and her youngest son, Richard of Shrewsbury, Duke of York. On 10/11 June, Richard wrote to Ralph, Lord Neville, the City of York and others asking for their support against "the Queen, her blood adherents and affinity" whom he suspected of plotting his murder. At a council meeting on 13 June at the Tower of London, Richard accused Hastings and others of having conspired against him with the Woodvilles and accusing Jane Shore, lover to both Hastings and Thomas Grey, of acting as a go-between. According to Thomas More, Hastings was taken out of the council chambers and summarily executed in the courtyard, while others, like Lord Thomas Stanley and John Morton, Bishop of Ely, were arrested. Hastings was not attainted and Richard sealed an indenture that placed Hastings' widow, Katherine, under his protection. Bishop Morton was released into the custody of Buckingham. On 16 June, the dowager queen agreed to hand over the Duke of York to the Archbishop of Canterbury so that he might attend his brother Edward's coronation, still planned for 22 June.

== King of England ==
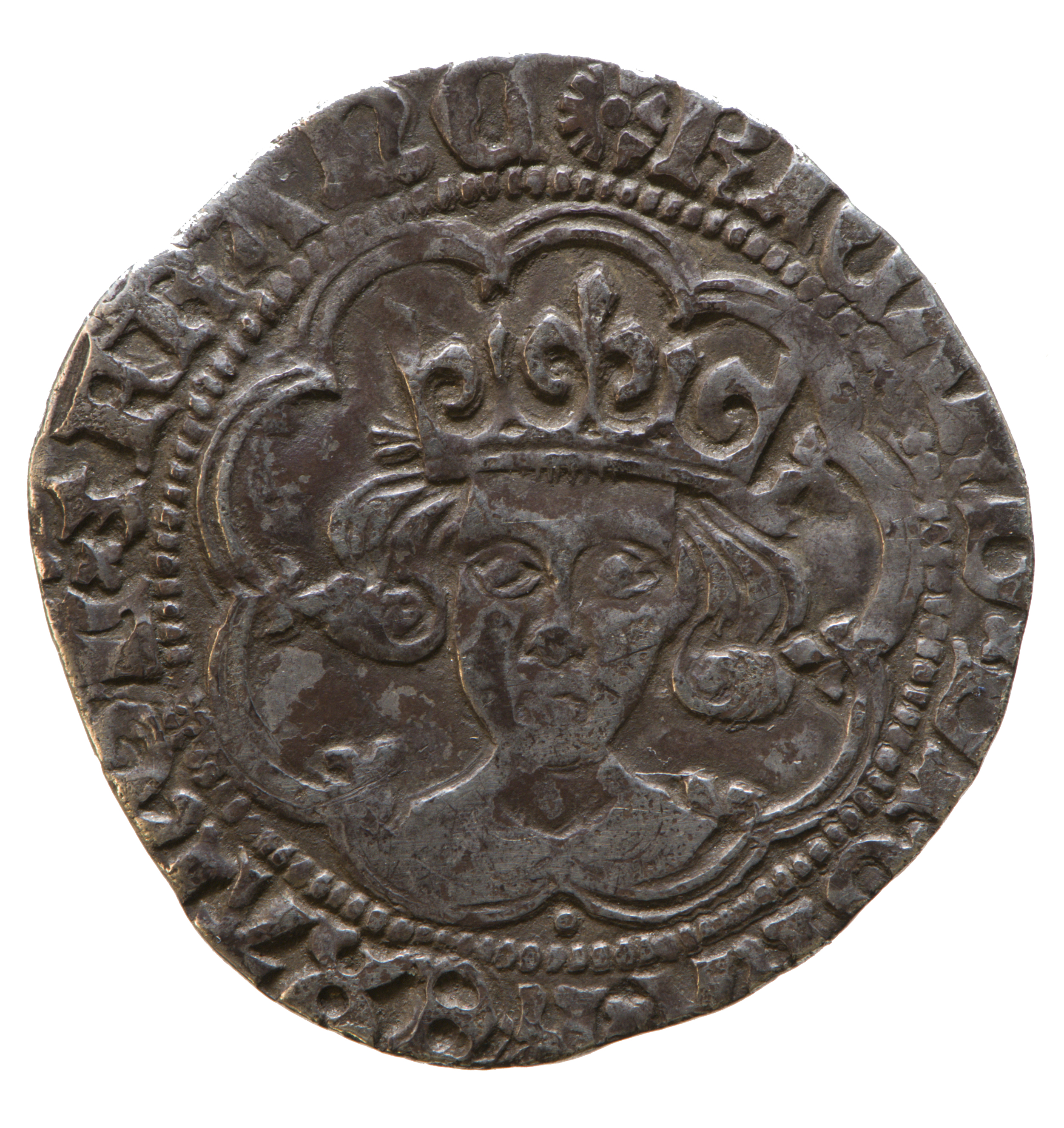
Silver groat of Richard III

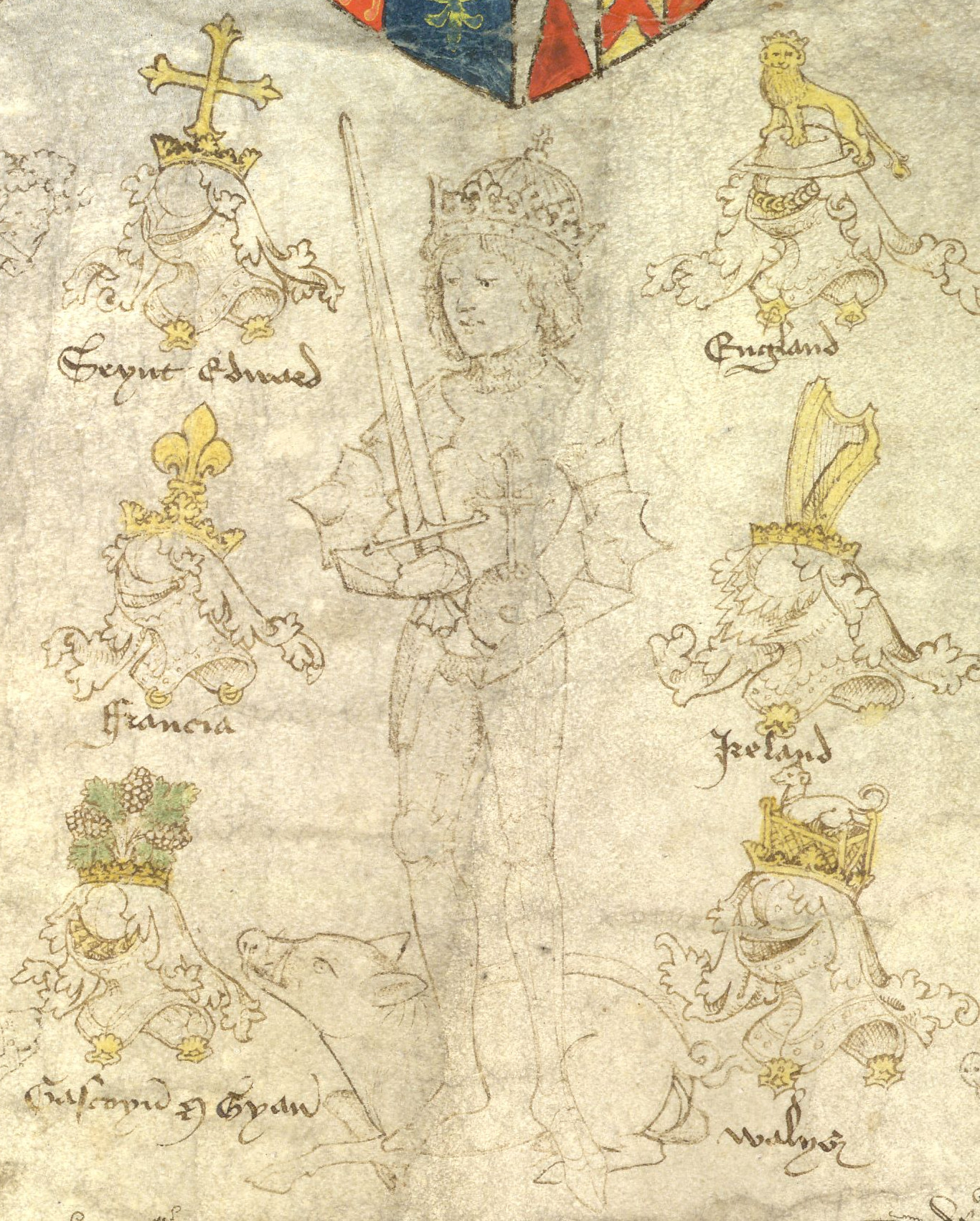
Detail from the Rous Roll (1483) showing Richard with a sword in his right hand, a globus cruciger in his left, a white boar (his heraldic badge) at his feet, framed by the crests and helms of England, Ireland, Wales, Gascony-Guyenne, France and St. Edward the Confessor.

Robert Stillington, the Bishop of Bath and Wells, is said to have informed Richard that Edward IV's marriage to Elizabeth Woodville was invalid because of Edward's earlier union with Eleanor Butler, making Edward V and his siblings illegitimate. The identity of Stillington was known only through the memoirs of the French diplomat, Philippe de Commines. On 22 June, a sermon was preached outside Old St. Paul's Cathedral by Ralph Shaa, declaring Edward IV's children bastards and Richard the rightful king. Shortly after, the citizens of London, nobles and commons, convened and drew up a petition asking Richard to assume the throne. He accepted on 26 June and was crowned at Westminster Abbey on 6 July. His title to the throne was confirmed by Parliament in January 1484 by the document Titulus Regius.

The princes, who were still lodged in the royal residence of the Tower of London at the time of Richard's coronation, disappeared from sight after the summer of 1483. Although after his death Richard III was accused of having Edward and his brother killed, notably by More and in Shakespeare's play, the facts surrounding their disappearance remain unknown. Other culprits have been suggested, including Buckingham and even Henry VII, although Richard remains the primary suspect.

After the coronation ceremony, Richard and Anne set out on a royal progress to meet their subjects. During this journey through the country, the king and queen endowed King's College and Queens' College at Cambridge University, and made grants to the church. Still feeling a strong bond with his northern estates, Richard later planned the establishment of a large chantry chapel in York Minster with over 100 priests. He also founded the College of Arms.

=== Buckingham's rebellion of 1483 ===
In 1483, a conspiracy arose among a number of disaffected gentry, many of whom had been supporters of Edward IV and the "whole Yorkist establishment". The conspiracy was nominally led by Richard's former ally, the Duke of Buckingham, although it had begun as a Woodville-Beaufort conspiracy (being "well underway" by the time of the Duke's involvement). (Note: Rosemary Horrox notes that "Buckingham was an exception amongst the rebels as, far from being a previous favourite, he 'had been refused any political role by Edward IV'".) Davies has suggested that it was "only the subsequent parliamentary attainder that placed Buckingham at the centre of events", to blame a disaffected magnate motivated by greed, rather than "the embarrassing truth" that those opposing Richard were actually "overwhelmingly Edwardian loyalists". It is possible that they planned to depose Richard III and place Edward V back on the throne, and that when rumours arose that Edward and his brother were dead, Buckingham proposed that Henry Tudor should return from exile, take the throne and marry Elizabeth, eldest daughter of Edward IV. It has also been pointed out that as this narrative stems from Richard's parliament of 1484, it should probably be treated "with caution". For his part, Buckingham raised a substantial force from his estates in Wales and the Marches. Henry, in exile in Brittany, enjoyed the support of the Breton treasurer Pierre Landais, who hoped Buckingham's victory would cement an alliance between Brittany and England.

Some of Henry Tudor's ships ran into a storm and were forced to return to Brittany or Normandy, while Henry anchored off Plymouth for a week before learning of Buckingham's failure. Buckingham's army was troubled by the same storm and deserted when Richard's forces came against them. Buckingham tried to escape in disguise but was either turned in by a retainer for the bounty Richard had put on his head, or was discovered in hiding with him. He was convicted of treason and beheaded in Salisbury, near the Bull's Head Inn, on 2 November. His widow, Catherine Woodville, later married Jasper Tudor, the uncle of Henry Tudor. Richard made overtures to Landais, offering military support for Landais's weak regime under Francis II, Duke of Brittany, in exchange for Henry. Henry fled to Paris, where he secured support from the French regent Anne of Beaujeu, who supplied troops for an invasion in 1485.

== Death at the Battle of Bosworth Field ==
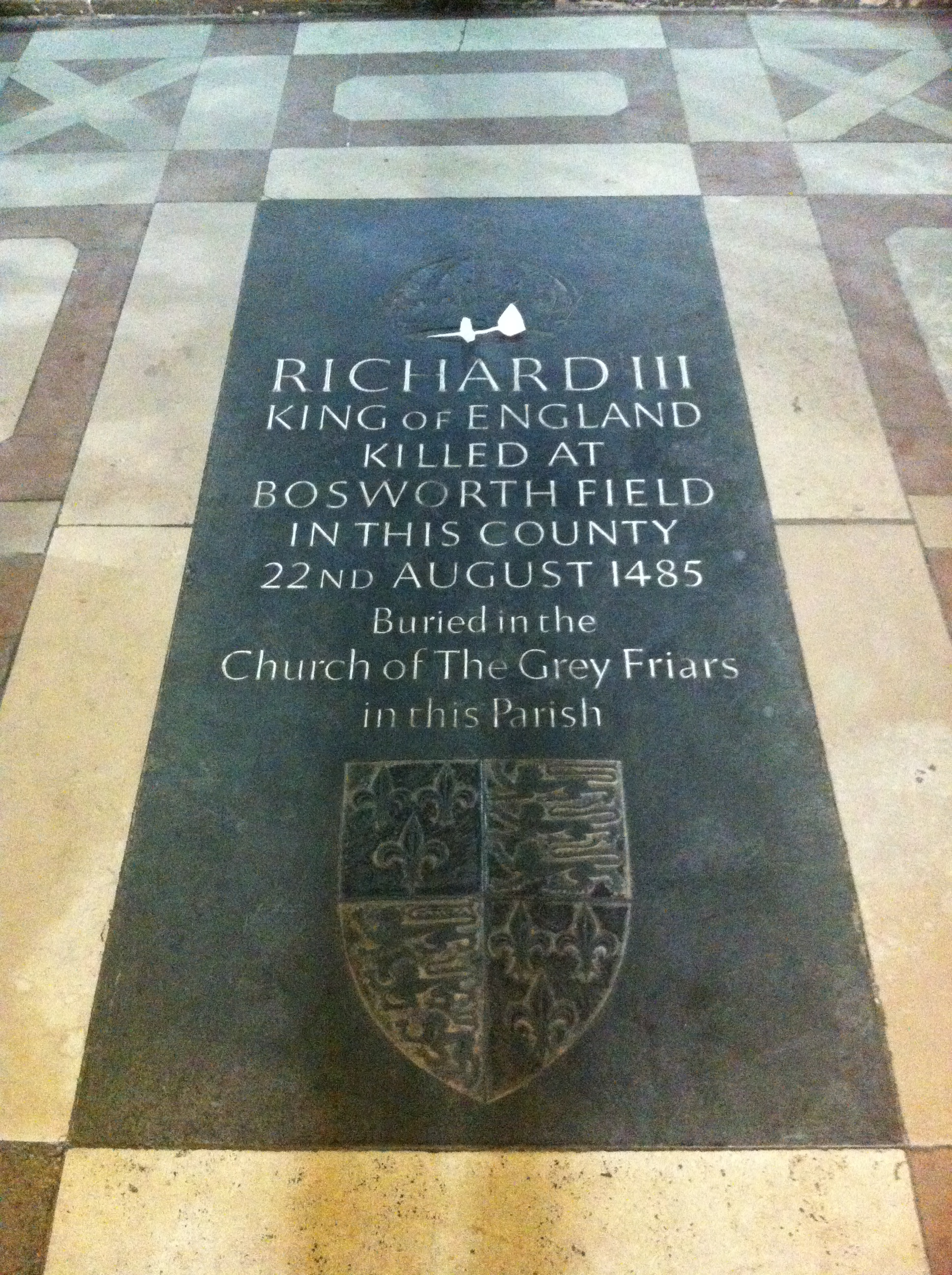
Former memorial ledger stone to Richard III in the choir of Leicester Cathedral, since replaced by his stone tomb (as illustrated further below)

On 22 August 1485, Richard met the outnumbered forces of Henry Tudor at the Battle of Bosworth Field. Richard rode a white courser, an especially swift and strong horse. The size of Richard's army has been estimated at 8,000 and Henry's at 5,000, but exact numbers are not known, though the royal army is believed to have "substantially" outnumbered Henry's. The traditional view of the king's famous cries of "Treason!" before falling was that during the battle Richard was abandoned by Baron Stanley (made Earl of Derby in October), Sir William Stanley, and Henry Percy, 4th Earl of Northumberland. The role of Northumberland is unclear; his position was with the reserve—behind the king's line—and he could not easily have moved forward without a general royal advance, which did not take place.

The physical confines behind the crest of Ambion Hill, combined with a difficulty of communications, probably physically hampered any attempt he made to join the fray. Despite appearing "a pillar of the Ricardian regime" and his previous loyalty to Edward IV, Baron Stanley was the stepfather of Henry Tudor and Stanley's inaction combined with his brother's entering the battle on Tudor's behalf was fundamental to Richard's defeat. The death of Richard's close companion John Howard, Duke of Norfolk, may have had a demoralising effect on the king and his men. Either way, Richard led a cavalry charge deep into the enemy ranks in an attempt to end the battle quickly by striking at Henry Tudor.

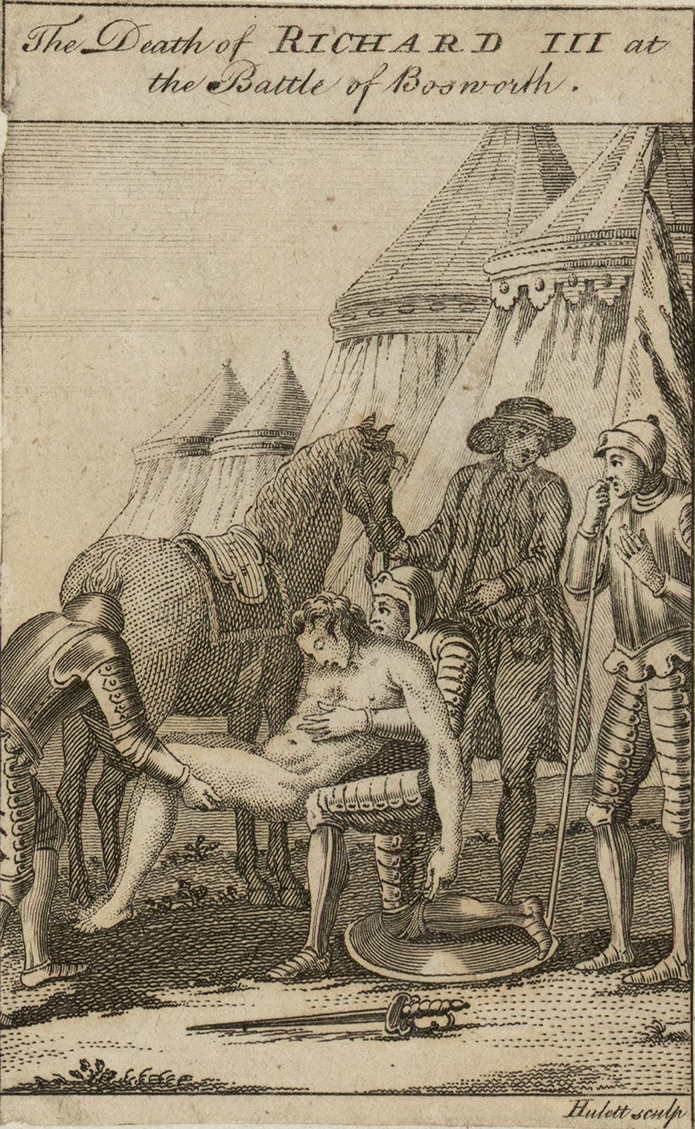
18th-century illustration of the death of Richard III at the Battle of Bosworth Field

All accounts note that King Richard fought bravely and ably during this manoeuvre, unhorsing Sir John Cheyne, a well-known jousting champion, killing Henry's standard bearer Sir William Brandon and coming within a sword's length of Henry Tudor before being surrounded by Sir William Stanley's men and killed. Polydore Vergil, Henry VII's official historian, recorded that "King Richard, alone, was killed fighting manfully in the thickest press of his enemies". The Burgundian chronicler Jean Molinet states that a Welshman struck the death blow with a halberd while Richard's horse was stuck in the marshy ground. It was said that the blows were so violent that the king's helmet was driven into his skull. It has been suggested that the poet Guto'r Glyn credits leading Welsh Lancastrian Rhys ap Thomas personally with the killing blow based on line 38 of his only surviving panegyric to the nobleman: Lladd y baedd, eilliodd ei ben 'killing the boar, he shaved his head'. Richard's emblem was a white boar, but Dafydd Johnston notes that the grammatical subject of the phrase in this poem is y Cing Harri 'King Henry' in line 35. The reference to the shaving likely refers instead to a post mortem ritual shaving of Richard's head, to be compared with the shaving of a boar's head before cooking. Nevertheless, the poet does appear to suggest Richard was killed by a group of soldiers led by Rhys.

The identification in 2013 of King Richard's body shows that the skeleton had 11 wounds, eight of them to the skull, clearly inflicted in battle and suggesting he had lost his helmet. Professor Guy Rutty, from the University of Leicester, said: "The most likely injuries to have caused the king's death are the two to the inferior aspect of the skull—a large sharp force trauma possibly from a sword or staff weapon, such as a halberd or bill, and a penetrating injury from the tip of an edged weapon." The skull showed that a blade had hacked away part of the rear of the skull. Richard III was the last English king to be killed in battle. Henry Tudor succeeded Richard as King Henry VII. He married the Yorkist heiress Elizabeth of York, Edward IV's daughter and Richard III's niece.

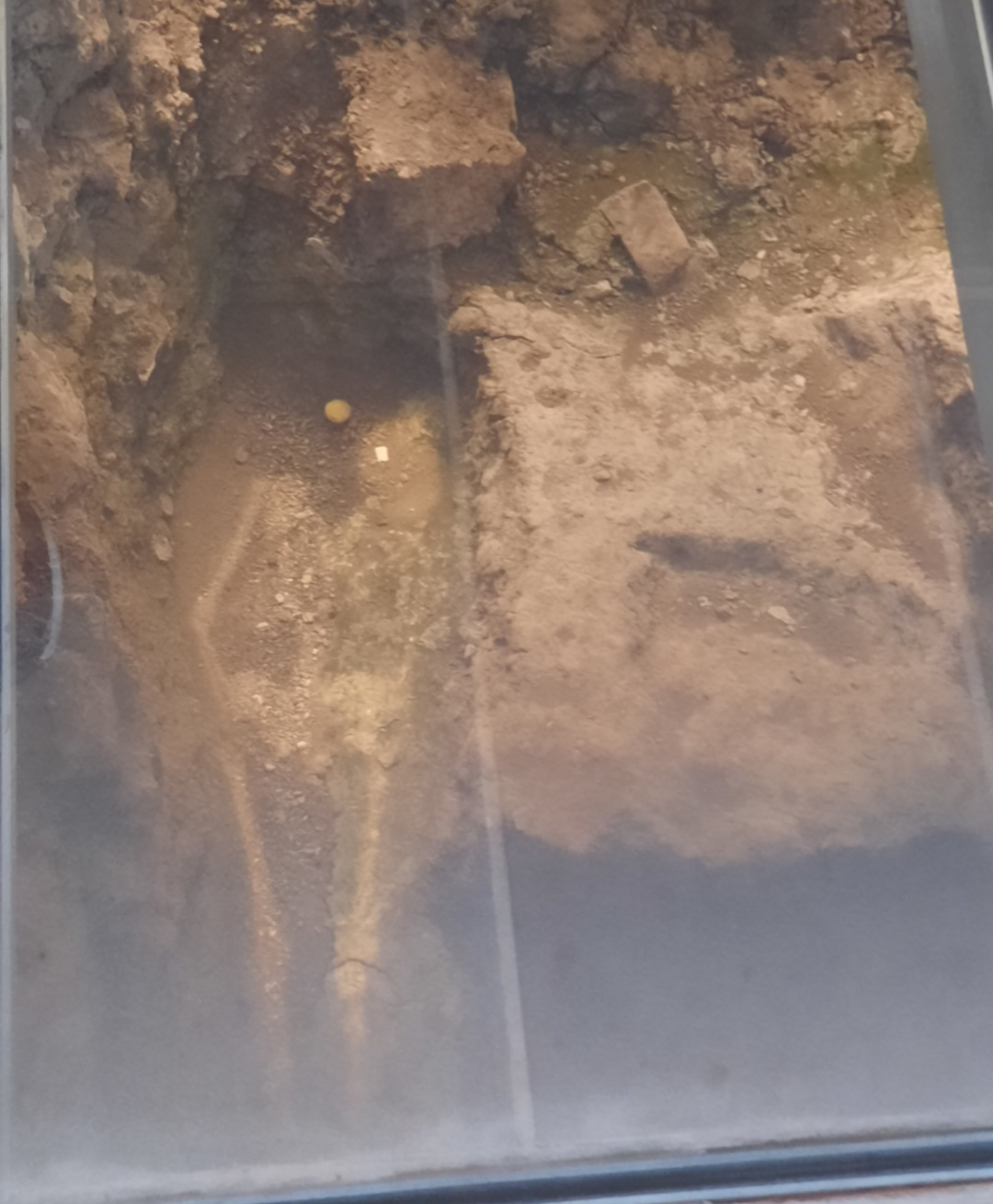
Richard III's grave in 2013

After the Battle of Bosworth, Richard's naked body was carried back to Leicester tied to a horse, and early sources strongly suggest that it was displayed in the collegiate Church of the Annunciation of Our Lady of the Newarke, prior to being hastily and discreetly buried in the choir of Greyfriars Church in Leicester. In 1495, Henry VII paid 50 pounds for a marble and alabaster monument. According to a discredited tradition, during the Dissolution of the Monasteries, his body was thrown into the River Soar, although other evidence suggests that a memorial stone was visible in 1612, in a garden built on the site of Greyfriars. The exact location was then lost, owing to more than 400 years of subsequent development, until archaeological investigations in 2012 revealed the site of the garden and Greyfriars Church. There was a memorial ledger stone in the choir of the cathedral, since replaced by the tomb of the king, and a stone plaque on Bow Bridge where tradition had falsely suggested that his remains had been thrown into the river.

According to another tradition, Richard consulted a seer in Leicester before the battle who foretold that "where your spur should strike on the ride into battle, your head shall be broken on the return". On the ride into battle, his spur struck the bridge stone of Bow Bridge in the city; legend states that as his corpse was carried from the battle over the back of a horse, his head struck the same stone and was broken open.

== Legacy ==
Richard's Council of the North, described as his "one major institutional innovation", derived from his ducal council following his own viceregal appointment by Edward IV; when Richard himself became king, he maintained the same conciliar structure in his absence. It officially became part of the royal council machinery under the presidency of John de la Pole, Earl of Lincoln in April 1484, based at Sandal Castle in Wakefield. It is considered to have greatly improved conditions for northern England, as it was intended to keep the peace and punish lawbreakers, as well as resolve land disputes. Bringing regional governance directly under the control of central government, it has been described as the king's "most enduring monument", surviving unchanged until 1641.

In December 1483, Richard instituted what later became known as the Court of Requests, a court to which poor people who could not afford legal representation could apply for their grievances to be heard. He also improved bail in January 1484, to protect suspected felons from imprisonment before trial and to protect their property from seizure during that time. He founded the College of Arms in 1484, he banned restrictions on the printing and sale of books, and he ordered the translation of the written Laws and Statutes from the traditional French into English. During his reign, Parliament ended the arbitrary benevolence (a device by which Edward IV raised funds), made it punishable to conceal from a buyer of land that a part of the property had already been disposed of to somebody else, required that land sales be published, laid down property qualifications for jurors, restricted the abusive Courts of Piepowders, regulated cloth sales, instituted certain forms of trade protectionism, prohibited the sale of wine and oil in fraudulent measure, and prohibited fraudulent collection of clergy dues, among others. Churchill implies he improved the law of trusts.

Richard's death at Bosworth marked the end of the Plantagenet dynasty, which had ruled England since the succession of Henry II in 1154. The last legitimate male Plantagenet, Richard's nephew Edward, Earl of Warwick (son of his brother George, Duke of Clarence), was executed by Henry VII in 1499.

=== Reputation ===
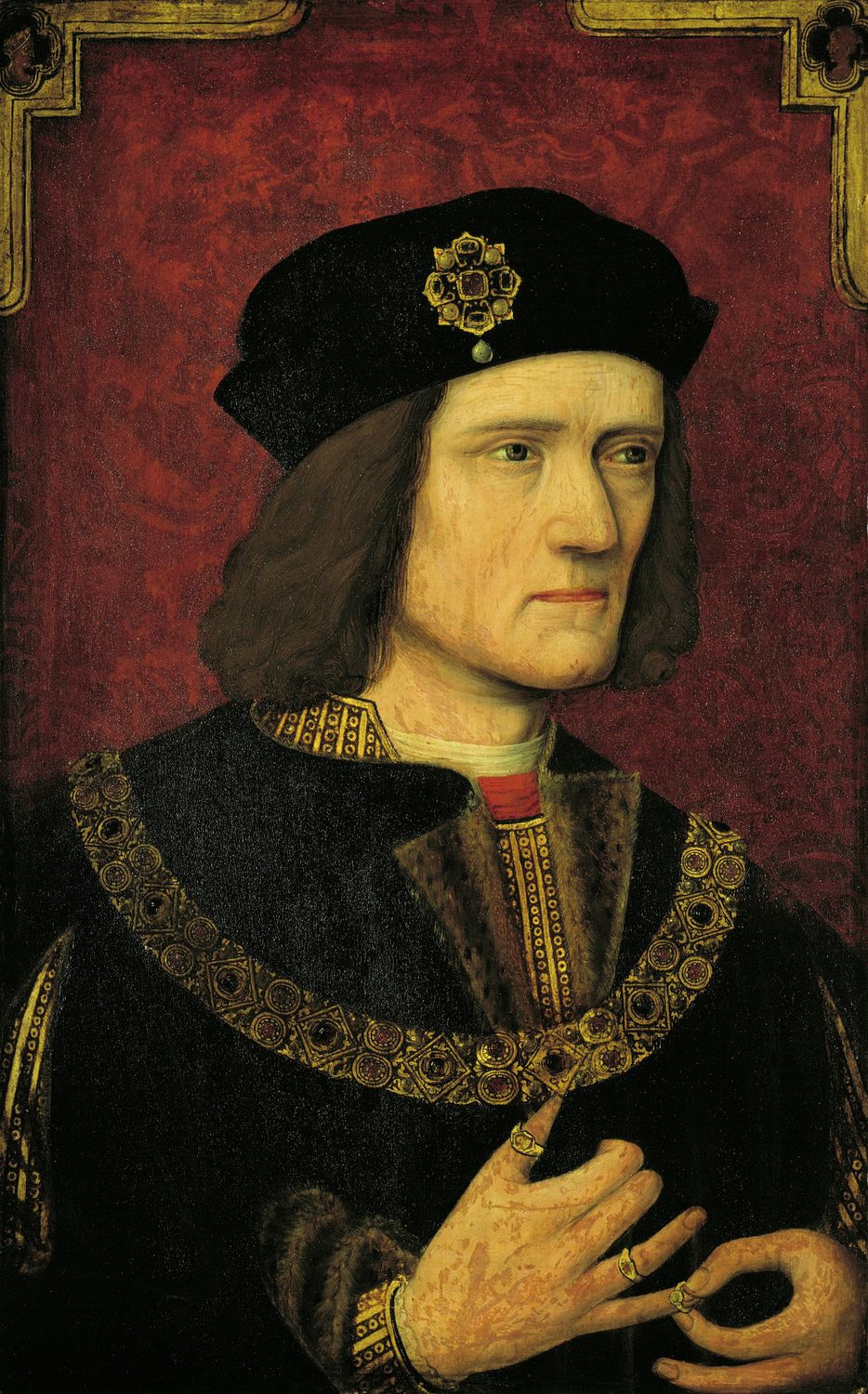
16th-century portrait, (oil on panel, Royal Collection)

There are numerous contemporary, or near-contemporary, sources of information about the reign of Richard III. These include the Croyland Chronicle, Commines' Mémoires, the report of Dominic Mancini, the Paston Letters, the Chronicles of Robert Fabyan and numerous court and official records, including a few letters by Richard himself. However, the debate about Richard's true character and motives continues, both because of the subjectivity of many of the written sources, reflecting the generally partisan nature of writers of this period, and because none was written by men with an intimate knowledge of Richard.

During Richard's reign, the historian John Rous praised him as a "good lord" who punished "oppressors of the commons", adding that he had "a great heart". In 1483, the Italian observer Mancini reported that Richard enjoyed a good reputation and that both "his private life and public activities powerfully attracted the esteem of strangers". His bond to the City of York, in particular, was such that on hearing of Richard's demise at the battle of Bosworth the City Council officially deplored the king's death, at the risk of facing the victor's wrath.

During his lifetime he was the subject of some attacks. Even in the North in 1482, a man was prosecuted for offences against the Duke of Gloucester, saying he did "nothing but grin at" the city of York. In 1484, attempts to discredit him took the form of hostile placards, the only surviving one being William Collingbourne's lampoon of July 1484 "The Cat, the Rat, and Lovell the Dog, all rule England under a Hog" which was pinned to the door of St. Paul's Cathedral and referred to Richard himself (the Hog) and his most trusted councillors William Catesby, Richard Ratcliffe and Francis, Viscount Lovell. On 30 March 1485 Richard felt forced to summon the Lords and London City Councillors to publicly deny the rumours that he had poisoned Queen Anne and that he had planned marriage to his niece Elizabeth, at the same time ordering the Sheriff of London to imprison anyone spreading such slanders. The same orders were issued throughout the realm, including York where the royal pronouncement recorded in the City Records dates 5 April 1485 and carries specific instructions to suppress seditious talk and remove and destroy evidently hostile placards unread.

As for Richard's physical appearance, most contemporary descriptions bear out the evidence that aside from having one shoulder higher than the other (with chronicler Rous not able to correctly remember which one, as slight as the difference was), Richard had no other noticeable bodily deformity. John Stow talked to old men who, remembering him, said "that he was of bodily shape comely enough, only of low stature" and a German traveller, Nicolas von Poppelau, who spent ten days in Richard's household in May 1484, describes him as "three fingers taller than himself...much more lean, with delicate arms and legs and also a great heart." Six years after Richard's death, in 1491, a schoolmaster named William Burton, on hearing a defence of Richard, launched into a diatribe, accusing the dead king of being "a hypocrite and a crookback...who was deservedly buried in a ditch like a dog."

Richard's death encouraged the furtherance of this later negative image by his Tudor successors due to the fact that it helped to legitimise Henry VII's seizure of the throne. The Richard III Society contends that this means that what "a lot of what people thought they knew about Richard III was pretty much propaganda and myth building." The Tudor characterisation culminated in the famous fictional portrayal of him in Shakespeare's play Richard III as a physically deformed, Machiavellian villain, ruthlessly committing numerous murders in order to claw his way to power; Shakespeare's intention perhaps being to use Richard III as a vehicle for creating his own Marlowesque protagonist. Rous himself in his History of the Kings of England, written during Henry VII's reign, initiated the process. He reversed his earlier position, and now portrayed Richard as a freakish individual who was born with teeth and shoulder-length hair after having been in his mother's womb for two years. His body was stunted and distorted, with one shoulder higher than the other, and he was "slight in body and weak in strength". Rous also attributes the murder of Henry VI to Richard, and claims that he poisoned his own wife. Jeremy Potter, a former Chair of the Richard III Society, claims that "At the bar of history Richard III continues to be guilty because it is impossible to prove him innocent. The Tudors ride high in popular esteem."

Polydore Vergil and Thomas More expanded on this portrayal, emphasising Richard's outward physical deformities as a sign of his inwardly twisted mind. More describes him as "little of stature, ill-featured of limbs, crook-backed ... hard-favoured of visage". Vergil also says he was "deformed of body ... one shoulder higher than the right". Both emphasise that Richard was devious and flattering, while planning the downfall of both his enemies and supposed friends. Richard's good qualities were his intelligence and bravery. All these characteristics are repeated by Shakespeare, who portrays him as having a hunch, a limp and a withered arm. With regard to the "hunch", the second quarto edition of Richard III (1598) used the term "hunched-backed" but in the First Folio edition (1623) it became "bunch-backed".

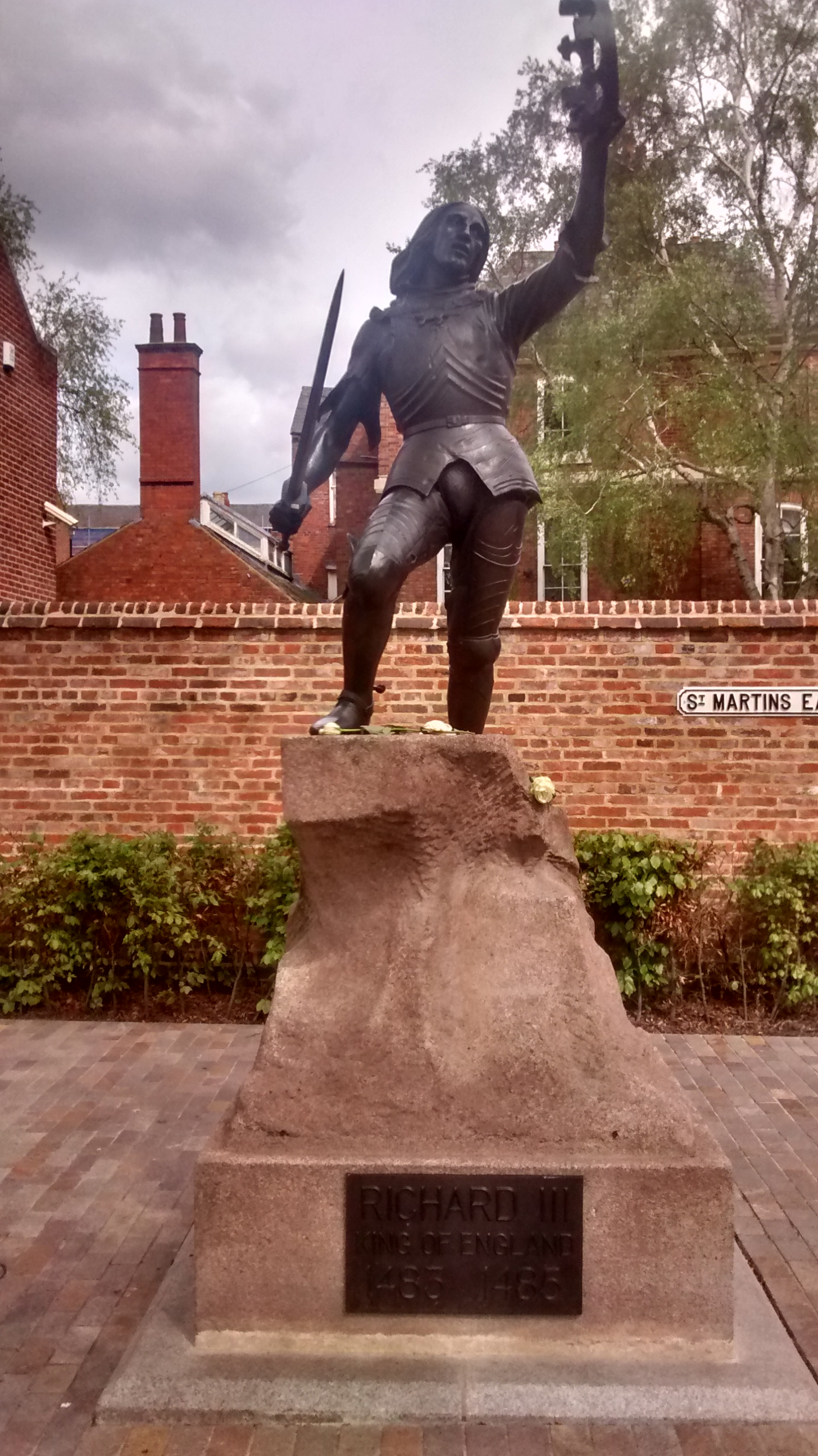
A statue of Richard III now outside Leicester Cathedral

Richard's reputation as a promoter of legal fairness persisted, however. William Camden in his Remains Concerning Britain (1605) states that Richard, "albeit he lived wickedly, yet made good laws". Francis Bacon also states that he was "a good lawmaker for the ease and solace of the common people". In 1525, Cardinal Wolsey upbraided the aldermen and Mayor of London for relying on a statute of Richard to avoid paying an extorted tax (benevolence) but received the reply "although he did evil, yet in his time were many good acts made."

Richard was a practising Catholic, as shown by his personal Book of Hours, surviving in the Lambeth Palace library. As well as conventional aristocratic devotional texts, the book contains a Collect of Saint Ninian, referencing a saint popular in the Anglo-Scottish Borders.

Despite this, the image of Richard as a ruthless tyrant remained dominant in the 18th and 19th centuries. The 18th-century philosopher and historian David Hume described him as a man who used dissimulation to conceal "his fierce and savage nature" and who had "abandoned all principles of honour and humanity". Hume acknowledged that some historians have argued "that he was well qualified for government, had he legally obtained it; and that he committed no crimes but such as were necessary to procure him possession of the crown", but he dismissed this view on the grounds that Richard's exercise of arbitrary power encouraged instability. The most important late 19th century biographer of the king was James Gairdner, who also wrote the entry on Richard in the Dictionary of National Biography. Gairdner stated that he had begun to study Richard with a neutral viewpoint, but became convinced that Shakespeare and More were essentially correct in their view of the king, despite some exaggerations.

Richard was not without his defenders, the first of whom was Sir George Buck, a descendant of one of the king's supporters, who completed The history of King Richard the Third in 1619. The authoritative Buck text was published only in 1979, though a corrupted version was published by Buck's great-nephew in 1646. Buck attacked the "improbable imputations and strange and spiteful scandals" related by Tudor writers, including Richard's alleged deformities and murders. He located lost archival material, including the Titulus Regius, but also claimed to have seen a letter written by Elizabeth of York, according to which Elizabeth sought to marry the king. Elizabeth's supposed letter was never produced. Documents which later emerged from the Portuguese royal archives show that after Queen Anne's death, Richard's ambassadors were sent on a formal errand to negotiate a double marriage between Richard and the Portuguese king's sister Joanna, of Lancastrian descent, and between Elizabeth of York and Joanna's cousin Manuel, Duke of Viseu (later King of Portugal).

Significant among Richard's defenders was Horace Walpole. In Historic Doubts on the Life and Reign of King Richard the Third (1768), Walpole disputed all the alleged murders and argued that Richard may have acted in good faith. He also argued that any physical abnormality was probably no more than a minor distortion of the shoulders. However, he retracted his views in 1793 after the Terror, stating he now believed that Richard could have committed the crimes he was charged with, although Pollard observes that this retraction is frequently overlooked by later admirers of Richard. Other defenders of Richard include the noted explorer Clements Markham, whose Richard III: His Life and Character (1906) replied to the work of Gairdner. He argued that Henry VII killed the princes and that the bulk of evidence against Richard was nothing more than Tudor propaganda. An intermediate view was provided by Alfred Legge in The Unpopular King (1885). Legge argued that Richard's "greatness of soul" was eventually "warped and dwarfed" by the ingratitude of others.

Some 20th-century historians have been less inclined to moral judgement, seeing Richard's actions as a product of the unstable times. In the words of Charles Ross, "the later fifteenth century in England is now seen as a ruthless and violent age as concerns the upper ranks of society, full of private feuds, intimidation, land-hunger, and litigiousness, and consideration of Richard's life and career against this background has tended to remove him from the lonely pinnacle of Villainy Incarnate on which Shakespeare had placed him. Like most men, he was conditioned by the standards of his age." The Richard III Society, founded in 1924 as "The Fellowship of the White Boar", is the oldest of several Ricardian groups dedicated to improving his reputation. Other historians still describe him as a "power-hungry and ruthless politician" who was most probably "ultimately responsible for the murder of his nephews."

=== In culture ===
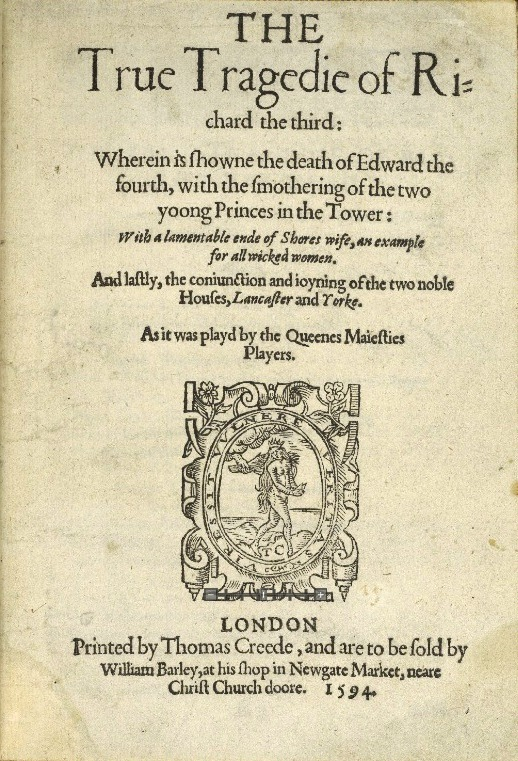
Cover of the 1594 quarto of the anonymous play, The True Tragedy of Richard III.

Richard III is the protagonist of Richard III, one of William Shakespeare's history/tragedy plays. Apart from Shakespeare, he appears in many other works of literature. Two other plays of the Elizabethan era predated Shakespeare's work. The Latin-language drama Richardus Tertius (first known performance in 1580) by Thomas Legge is believed to be the first history play written in England. The anonymous play The True Tragedy of Richard III (c. 1590), performed in the same decade as Shakespeare's work, was probably an influence on Shakespeare. Neither of the two plays places any emphasis on Richard's physical appearance, though the True Tragedy briefly mentions that he is "A man ill shaped, crooked backed, lame armed" and "valiantly minded, but tyrannous in authority". Both portray him as a man motivated by personal ambition, who uses everyone around him to get his way. Ben Jonson is also known to have written a play Richard Crookback in 1602, but it was never published and nothing is known about its portrayal of the king.

Marjorie Bowen's 1929 novel Dickon set the trend for pro-Ricardian literature. Particularly influential was The Daughter of Time (1951) by Josephine Tey, in which a modern detective concludes that Richard III is innocent in the death of the Princes. Other novelists such as Valerie Anand in the novel Crown of Roses (1989) have also offered alternative versions to the theory that he murdered them. Sharon Kay Penman, in her historical novel The Sunne in Splendour, attributes the death of the Princes to the Duke of Buckingham. In the mystery novel The Murders of Richard III by Elizabeth Peters (1974) the central plot revolves around the debate as to whether Richard III was guilty of these and other crimes. A sympathetic portrayal is given in The Founding (1980), the first volume in The Morland Dynasty series by Cynthia Harrod-Eagles.

One film adaptation of Shakespeare's play Richard III is the 1955 version directed and produced by Laurence Olivier, who also played the lead role. Also notable are the 1995 film version starring Ian McKellen, set in a fictional 1930s fascist England, and Looking for Richard, a 1996 documentary film directed by Al Pacino, who plays the title character as well as himself. The play has been adapted for television on several occasions.

== Discovery of remains ==
On 24 August 2012, the University of Leicester, Leicester City Council, and the Richard III Society announced that they were initiating a search for the remains of King Richard. The project was managed by Philippa Langley of the Society's Looking for Richard Project with the archaeology run by University of Leicester Archaeological Services (ULAS). The participants looked for the lost site of the former Greyfriars Church (demolished during Henry VIII's dissolution of the monasteries) to find his remains. By comparing fixed points between maps, the church was found, where Richard's body had been hastily buried without pomp in 1485, its foundations identifiable beneath a modern city centre car park. In 1975 Audrey Strange of the Richard III Society had predicted that the lost grave lay beneath one of the three car parks that partly cover the site of the former Grey Friars Priory. In the mid-1980s, academic David Baldwin, a medieval historian formerly of Leicester University, concluded that the burial site lay further to the east, beneath the northern (St Martin's) end of Grey Friars Street, or the buildings that face it on either side.

Site of Greyfriars Church, Leicester, shown superimposed over a modern map of the area. The skeleton of Richard III was recovered in September 2012 from the centre of the choir, shown by a small blue dot.

The excavators found Greyfriars Church by 5 September 2012 and two days later announced that they had found Robert Herrick's garden, where the memorial to Richard III stood in the early 17th century. A human skeleton was found beneath the Church's choir.

The excavators found the remains in the course of the first excavation at the car park.

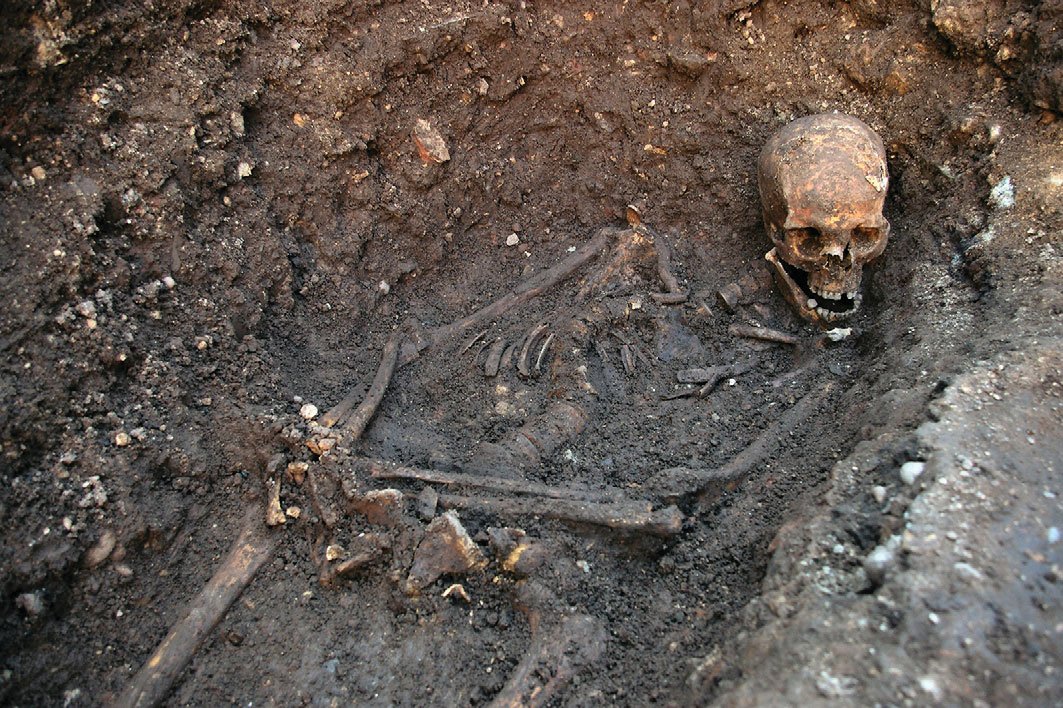
Skeleton as discovered

On 12 September, it was announced that the skeleton might be that of Richard III. Several reasons were given: the body was of an adult male, it was buried beneath the choir of the church, and there was severe scoliosis of the spine, possibly making one shoulder higher than the other. There was also what appeared to be an arrowhead embedded in the spine, and there were perimortem injuries to the skull. These included a shallow orifice which was probably caused by a rondel dagger, and a scooping depression to the skull that was probably inflicted by a sword.

Further, the bottom of the skull had a gaping hole, where a halberd had entered. The base of the skull had another fatal wound from a bladed weapon thrust, leaving a jagged hole. Inside the skull, there was evidence that the blade penetrated to a depth of 10.5 centimetres (4.1 in).

In total, the skeleton had 10 wounds: four minor injuries on the top of the skull, one dagger blow on the cheekbone, one cut on the lower jaw, two fatal injuries on the base of the skull, one cut on a rib bone, and one final wound on the pelvis that was probably inflicted after death. It is generally accepted that Richard's naked corpse was tied to the back of a horse, with his arms slung over one side and his legs and buttocks over the other. The angle of the blow on the pelvis suggests that one of those present stabbed Richard's right buttock with substantial force, as the cut extends from the back to the front of the pelvic bone, an action intended to humiliate. It is also possible that Richard and his corpse suffered other injuries which left no trace on the skeleton.

British historian John Ashdown-Hill had used genealogical research in 2004 to trace matrilineal descendants of Anne of York, Duchess of Exeter, Richard's elder sister. A British-born woman who emigrated to Canada after the Second World War, Joy Ibsen (née Brown), was found to be a 16th-generation great-niece of the king in the same direct maternal line. Her mitochondrial DNA was tested and belongs to mitochondrial DNA haplogroup J, which by deduction, should also be the mitochondrial DNA haplogroup of Richard III (rare mtDNA J1C2C3). Joy Ibsen died in 2008. Her son Michael Ibsen gave a mouth-swab sample to the research team on 24 August 2012. His mitochondrial DNA, passed down the direct maternal line, was compared to samples from the human remains found at the excavation site and used to identify King Richard.

On 4 February 2013, the University of Leicester confirmed that the skeleton was beyond reasonable doubt that of King Richard III. This conclusion was based on mitochondrial DNA evidence, soil analysis, and dental tests (there were some molars missing as a result of caries), as well as physical characteristics of the skeleton which are highly consistent with contemporary accounts of Richard's appearance. The team announced that the "arrowhead" discovered with the body was a Roman-era nail, probably disturbed when the body was first interred. However, there were numerous perimortem wounds on the body, and part of the skull had been sliced off with a bladed weapon; this would have caused rapid death. The team concluded that it is unlikely the king was wearing a helmet in his last moments. Soil taken from the remains was found to contain microscopic roundworm eggs. Several eggs were found in samples taken from the pelvis, where the king's intestines were, but not from the skull, and only very small numbers were identified in soil surrounding the grave. The findings suggest that the higher concentration of eggs in the pelvic area probably arose from a roundworm infection the king suffered in his life, rather than from human waste dumped in the area at a later date, researchers said. The mayor of Leicester announced that the king's skeleton would be re-interred at Leicester Cathedral in early 2014, but a judicial review of that decision delayed the reinterment for a year. A museum to Richard III was opened in July 2014 in the Victorian school buildings next to the Greyfriars grave site.

On 5 February 2013 Caroline Wilkinson of the University of Dundee conducted a facial reconstruction of Richard III, commissioned by the Richard III Society, based on 3D mappings of his skull. The face is described as "warm, young, earnest and rather serious". On 11 February 2014 the University of Leicester announced the project to sequence the entire genome of Richard III and one of his living relatives, Michael Ibsen, whose mitochondrial DNA confirmed the identification of the excavated remains. Richard III thus became the first ancient person of known historical identity whose genome has been sequenced.

In November 2014, the results of the DNA testing were published, confirming that the maternal side was as previously thought. The paternal side, however, demonstrated some variance from what had been expected, with the DNA showing no links between Richard (YDNA Haplogroup G-PF3293, possibly clade G-S11415 under G-L30) and Henry Somerset, 5th Duke of Beaufort (YDNA Haplogroup R1b-U152), a purported descendant of Richard's great-great-grandfather Edward III of England. This could be the result of covert illegitimacy that does not reflect the accepted genealogies between Edward III and either Richard III or the 5th Duke of Beaufort.

=== Reburial and tomb ===
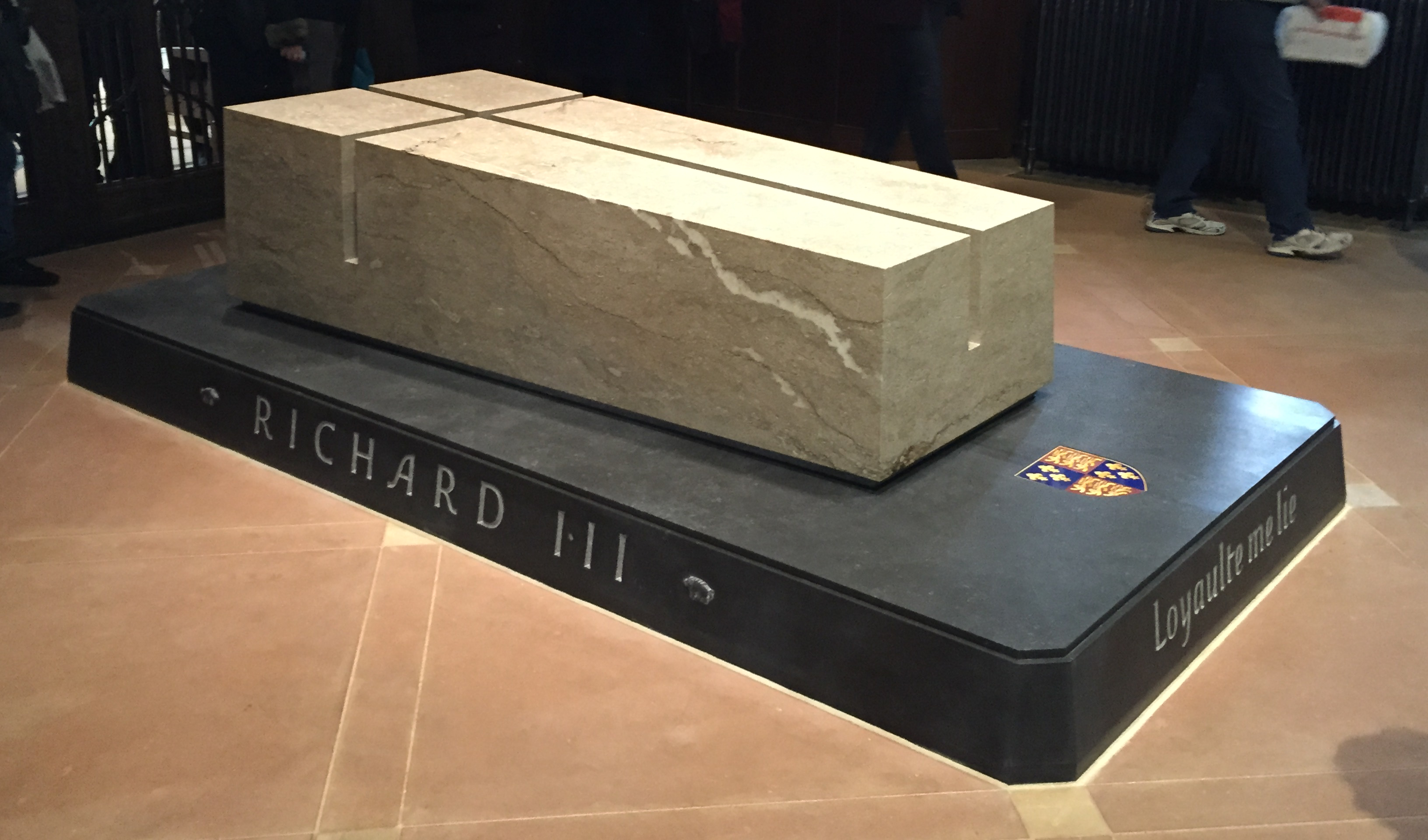
Modern tomb of Richard III in Leicester Cathedral, with his motto Loyaulte me lie (loyalty binds me) at right

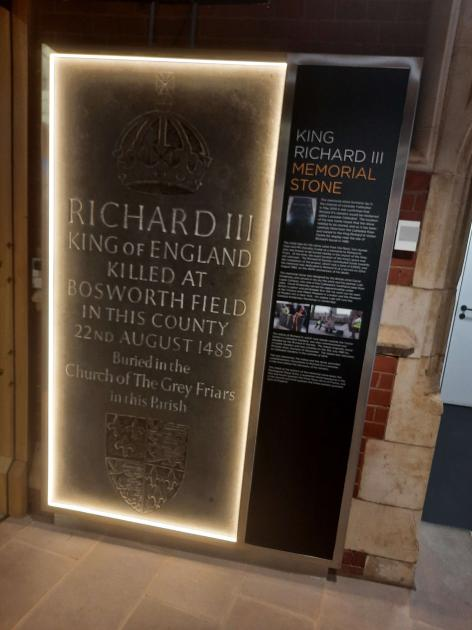
The ledger stone memorial from Leicester Cathedral now resides in the King Richard III Visitor Centre.

After his death in battle in 1485, Richard III's body was buried in Greyfriars Church in Leicester. Following the discoveries of Richard's remains in 2012, it was decided that they should be reburied at Leicester Cathedral, despite feelings in some quarters that he should have been reburied in York Minster. Those who challenged the decision included fifteen "collateral [non-direct] descendants of Richard III", represented by the Plantagenet Alliance, who believed that the body should be reburied in York, as they claim the king wished. In August 2013, they filed a court case in order to contest Leicester's claim to re-inter the body within its cathedral, and propose the body be buried in York instead. However, Michael Ibsen, who gave the DNA sample that identified the king, gave his support to Leicester's claim to re-inter the body in their cathedral. On 20 August, a judge ruled that the opponents had the legal standing to contest his burial in Leicester Cathedral, despite a clause in the contract which had authorized the excavations requiring his burial there. He urged the parties, though, to settle out of court in order to "avoid embarking on the Wars of the Roses, Part Two". The Plantagenet Alliance, and the supporting fifteen collateral descendants, also faced the challenge that "Basic maths shows Richard, who had no surviving children but five siblings, could have millions of 'collateral' descendants" undermining the group's claim to represent "the only people who can speak on behalf of him". A ruling in May 2014 decreed that there are "no public law grounds for the Court interfering with the decisions in question". The remains were taken to Leicester Cathedral on 22 March 2015 and reinterred on 26 March.

His remains were carried in procession to the cathedral on 22 March 2015, and reburied on 26 March 2015 at a religious re-burial service at which both Tim Stevens, the Bishop of Leicester, and Justin Welby, the Archbishop of Canterbury, officiated. Also present at the ceremony was Archbishop of Westminster and Roman Catholic Primate of England, Cardinal Vincent Nichols, as Richard III professed Catholicism. The British royal family was represented by the Duke and Duchess of Gloucester and the Countess of Wessex. The actor Benedict Cumberbatch, who later portrayed him in The Hollow Crown television series, read a poem by poet laureate Carol Ann Duffy.

Richard's cathedral tomb was designed by the architects van Heyningen and Haward. The tombstone is deeply incised with a cross, and consists of a rectangular block of white Swaledale fossil stone, quarried in North Yorkshire. It sits on a low plinth made of dark Kilkenny marble, incised with Richard's name, dates and motto (Loyaulte me lie – loyalty binds me). The plinth also carries his coat of arms in pietra dura. On top is a funeral crown commissioned specifically for the reinterment, and made by George Easton. The remains of Richard III are in a lead-lined inner casket, inside an outer English oak coffin crafted by Michael Ibsen, a direct descendant of Richard's sister Anne, and laid in a brick-lined vault below the floor, and below the plinth and tombstone. The original 2010 raised tomb design had been proposed by Langley's "Looking For Richard Project" and fully funded by members of the Richard III Society. The proposal was publicly launched by the Society on 13 February 2013 but rejected by Leicester Cathedral in favour of a memorial slab. However, following a public outcry, the Cathedral changed its position and on 18 July 2013 announced its agreement to give King Richard III a raised tomb monument.

== Issue ==
Richard and Anne had one son, Edward of Middleham, who was born between 1474 and 1476. He was created Earl of Salisbury on 15 February 1478, and Prince of Wales on 24 August 1483, and died on 9 April 1484, less than two months after he had been formally declared heir apparent. After the death of his son, Richard appointed his nephew John de la Pole, Earl of Lincoln, as Lieutenant of Ireland, an office previously held by his son Edward. Lincoln was the son of Richard's older sister, Elizabeth, Duchess of Suffolk. After his wife's death, Richard commenced negotiations with John II of Portugal to marry John's sister Joanna. The pious princess had already turned down several suitors because of her preference for the religious life.

Richard had two acknowledged illegitimate children, John of Gloucester and Katherine Plantagenet. Also known as 'John of Pontefract', John of Gloucester was appointed Captain of Calais in 1485. Katherine married William Herbert, 2nd Earl of Pembroke, in 1484. Neither the birth dates nor the names of the mothers of either of the children are known. Katherine was old enough to be wedded in 1484, when the age of consent was twelve, and John was knighted in September 1483 in York Minster, and so most historians agree that they were both fathered when Richard was a teenager. There is no evidence of infidelity on Richard's part after his marriage to Anne Neville in 1472 when he was around 20. This has led to a suggestion by the historian A. L. Rowse that Richard "had no interest in sex".

Michael Hicks and Josephine Wilkinson have suggested that Katherine's mother may have been Katherine Haute, on the basis of the grant of an annual payment of 100 shillings made to her in 1477.

Hicks and Wilkinson also suggest that John's mother may have been Alice Burgh. Richard visited Pontefract from 1471, in April and October 1473, and in early March 1474, for a week. On 1 March 1474, he granted Alice Burgh 20 pounds a year for life "for certain special causes and considerations". She later received another allowance, apparently for being engaged as a nurse for his brother George's son, Edward of Warwick. Richard continued her annuity when he became king. John Ashdown-Hill has suggested that John was conceived during Richard's first solo expedition to the eastern counties in the summer of 1467 at the invitation of John Howard and that the boy was born in 1468 and named after his friend and supporter. Richard himself noted John was still a minor (not being yet 21) when he issued the royal patent appointing him Captain of Calais on 11 March 1485, possibly on his seventeenth birthday.

Both of Richard's illegitimate children survived him, but they seem to have died without issue and their fate after Richard's demise at Bosworth is not certain. John received a 20-pound annuity from Henry VII, but there are no mentions of him in contemporary records after 1487 (the year of the Battle of Stoke Field). He may have been executed in 1499, though no record of this exists beyond an assertion by George Buck over a century later. Katherine apparently died before her cousin Elizabeth of York's coronation on 25 November 1487, since her husband Sir William Herbert is described as a widower by that time. Katherine's burial place was located in the London parish church of St James Garlickhithe, (Note: Specifically, in the Vinter's Hall, Thameside.) between Skinner's Lane and Upper Thames Street.

The mysterious Richard Plantagenet, who was first mentioned in Francis Peck's Desiderata Curiosa (a two-volume miscellany published 1732–1735) was said to be a possible illegitimate child of Richard III and is sometimes referred to as "Richard the Master-Builder" or "Richard of Eastwell", but it has also been suggested he could have been Richard, Duke of York, one of the missing Princes in the Tower. He died in 1550.

== Titles, styles, honours and arms ==
On 1 November 1461, Richard gained the title of Duke of Gloucester; in late 1461, he was invested as a Knight of the Garter. Following the death of King Edward IV, he was made Lord Protector of England. Richard held this office from 30 April to 26 June 1483, when he became king. During his reign, Richard was styled Dei Gratia Rex Angliae et Franciae et Dominus Hiberniae (by the Grace of God, King of England and France and Lord of Ireland).

Informally, he may have been known as "Dickon", according to a sixteenth-century legend of a note, warning of treachery, that was sent to the Duke of Norfolk on the eve of Bosworth:

Jack of Norfolk, be not too bold,
For Dickon, thy master, is bought and sold.

=== Arms ===
As Duke of Gloucester, Richard used the Royal Arms of France quartered with the Royal Arms of England, differenced by a label argent of three points ermine, on each point a canton gules, supported by a blue boar. As sovereign, he used the arms of the kingdom undifferenced, supported by two white boars. His motto was Loyaulte me lie, "Loyalty binds me"; and his personal device was a white boar.

Coats of arms of Richard III of England

Coat of arms of Richard as Duke of Gloucester

Royal achievement as king

=== Badges ===
Badges of Richard III of England

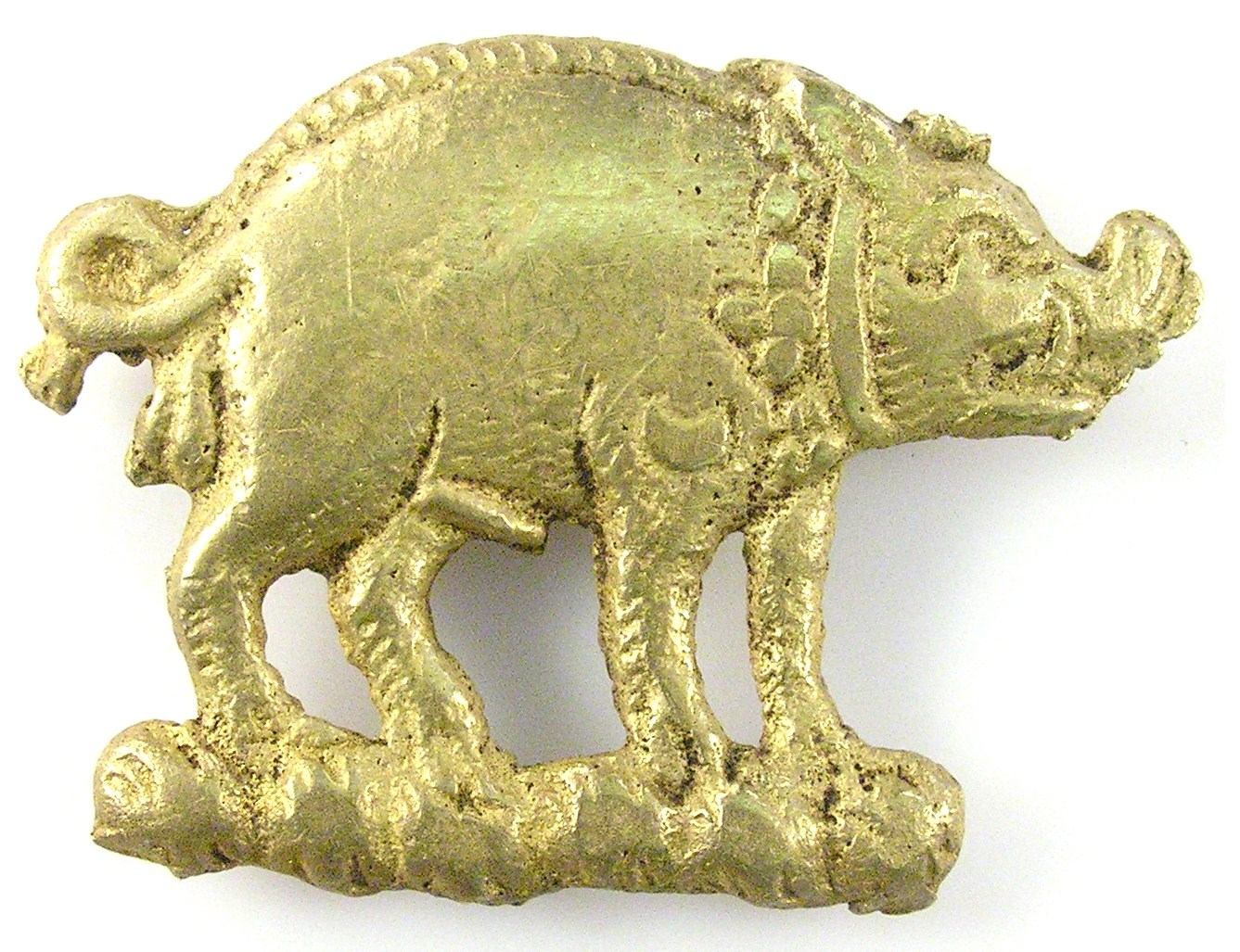
Bronze boar mount found on the Thames foreshore, and thought to have been worn by a supporter of Richard III.

White Boar Argent, armed and bristled

White rose of York

Sun in splendour

White falcon with a virgin's face holding a white rose.

== Family trees ==
Family tree of the Dukes of Gloucester, Dukes of Edinburgh, the Dukes of Gloucester and Edinburgh, the Marquesses of Carisbrooke, and the Earls of Ulster (UK creations)

Edward III of England; 1312–1377
Duke of Gloucester (1st creation), 1385
John of Gaunt; 1340–1399; Duke of Lancaster	Thomas of Woodstock; 1355–1397; Duke of Gloucester
Dukedom of Gloucester (1st creation) extinct, 1397
Henry IV of England; 1367–1413	John Beaufort; 1373–1410; 1st Earl of Somerset	Joan Beaufort c. 1379–1440
Duke of Gloucester (2nd creation), 1414
Humphrey of Lancaster; 1390–1447; Duke of Gloucester	John Beaufort; 1404–1444; Duke of Somerset	Cecily Neville; 1415–1495
Dukedom of Gloucester (2nd creation) extinct, 1447
Duke of Gloucester (3rd creation), 1461
Margaret Beaufort; 1443–1509	Edward IV of England; 1442–1483	Richard of York; 1452–1485; Duke of Gloucester; Later Richard III of England
Dukedom of Gloucester (3rd creation) merged in the Crown, 1483
Henry VII of England; 1457–1509	Elizabeth of York; 1466–1503
Margaret Tudor; 1489–1541	Henry VIII of England; 1491–1547
James V of Scotland; 1512–1542
Mary, Queen of Scots; 1542–1587
James VI & I of Scotland and England; 1566–1625
Princess Elizabeth Stuart; 1596–1662	Charles I of Scotland and England; 1600–1649
Duke of Gloucester (4th creation), 1659
Sophia of Hanover; 1630–1714	James II of Scotland and England; 1633–1701	Prince Henry; 1640–1660; Duke of Gloucester
Dukedom of Gloucester (4th creation) extinct, 1660
George I of Great Britain; 1660–1727	Anne of Great Britain; 1665–1714
George II of Great Britain; 1683–1760	Prince William; 1689–1700 styled Duke of Gloucester
Duke of Edinburgh (1st creation), Marquess of the Isle of Ely, Earl of Eltham (1st creation), Viscount Launceston, and Baron Snowdon, 1726
Prince Frederick Louis; 1707–1751; 1st Duke of Edinburgh, etc., styled Duke of Gloucester until created Duke of Edinburgh, 1726
Duke of Gloucester and Edinburgh, 1764
Prince George William Frederick; 1738–1820; 2nd Duke of Edinburgh, etc. Later George III of Great Britain, later the United Kingdom	Prince William Henry; 1743–1805; 1st Duke of Gloucester and Edinburgh
Dukedom of Edinburgh (1st creation) and subsidiary titles merged in the Crown, 1760	Dukedom of Gloucester and Edinburgh unused, 1805–1816
William IV of the United Kingdom; 1765–1837	Prince Edward; 1767–1820; Duke of Kent and Strathearn	Princess Mary; 1776–1857	Prince William Frederick; 1776–1834; 2nd Duke of Gloucester and Edinburgh
Dukedom of Gloucester and Edinburgh extinct, 1834
Queen Victoria of the United Kingdom; 1819–1901
Duke of Edinburgh (2nd creation) and Earl of Ulster (UK, 1st creation), 1866
Princess Alice; 1843–1878	Edward VII of the United Kingdom; 1841–1910	Prince Alfred Ernest Albert; 1844–1900; Duke of Saxe-Coburg and Gotha, Duke of Edinburgh, etc.	Princess Beatrice; 1857–1944
Dukedom of Edinburgh (2nd creation) and subsidiary title extinct, 1900
Marquess of Carisbrooke, Earl of Berkhampstead, Viscount Launceston, 1917
Princess Victoria of Hesse and by Rhine; 1863–1950	George V of the United Kingdom; 1865–1936	Alexander Albert Mountbatten; 1886–1960; Marquess of Carisbrooke, etc.
Marquessate of Carisbrooke and subsidiary titles extinct, 1960
Duke of Gloucester (5th creation), Earl of Ulster (UK, 2nd creation), Baron Culloden (2nd creation), 1928
Princess Alice of Battenberg; 1885–1969	George VI of the United Kingdom; 1895–1952	Prince Henry; 1900–1974; 1st Duke of Gloucester, etc.
Duke of Edinburgh (3rd creation), 1947
Prince Philip; 1921–2021; 1st Duke of Edinburgh	Elizabeth II of the United Kingdom; 1926–2022
Duke of Edinburgh (4th creation), 2023
Prince Charles b. 1948; 2nd Duke of Edinburgh; Later Charles III of the United Kingdom	Prince Edward b. 1964; Duke of Edinburgh, Earl of Wessex, Earl of Forfar, and Viscount Severn	Prince Richard b. 1944; 2nd Duke of Gloucester, etc.
Dukedom of Edinburgh (3rd creation) merged in the Crown, 2022	Dukedom of Edinburgh (4th creation) is a life peerage and therefore not hereditary
Alexander Windsor b. 1974 styled Earl of Ulster
Heir-apparent to the Dukedom of Gloucester
Xan Windsor b. 2007 styled Baron Culloden

English royal families in the Wars of the Roses

Dukes (except Aquitaine) and Princes of Wales are noted, as are the monarchs' reigns.
†=Killed in action; =Executed
See also Family tree of English monarchs

Henry of Grosmont; Duke of Lancaster	Edward III; King of England r. 1327–1377
Edward of Woodstock "The Black Prince"; Prince of Wales	Thomas of Woodstock; Duke of Gloucester	Blanche of Lancaster	John of Gaunt; Duke of Lancaster	Katherine Swynford	Edmund of Langley; Duke of York	Lionel of Antwerp; Duke of Clarence
Edward of Angoulême	Richard II; Prince of Wales, King of England r. 1377–1399	Henry IV; Duke of Lancaster, King of England r. 1399–1413	John Beaufort	Thomas Beaufort; Duke of Exeter	Joan Beaufort	Ralph Neville	Philippa of Clarence
Owen Tudor; Lancastrian	Catherine of Valois	Henry V Duke of Lancaster, Prince of Wales, King of England r. 1413–1422	Humphrey; Duke of Gloucester	Henry Percy "Hotspur"	Elizabeth Mortimer	Roger Mortimer
Edward of Norwich; Duke of York	Richard of Conisburgh	Anne de Mortimer
John Beaufort; Duke of Somerset; Lancastrian	Margaret of Anjou; Lancastrian	Henry VI; King of England r. 1422–1461, r. 1470–1471; Lancastrian	Edmund Beaufort; Duke of Somerset; Lancastrian †1st St Albans	William Neville; Yorkist	Anne Neville	Henry Percy; Lancastrian †1st St Albans	Eleanor Neville	Richard Neville; Yorkist; (executed) Wakefield	Cecily Neville	Richard of York; Duke of York, Prince of Wales; Yorkist †Wakefield
Henry Beaufort; Duke of Somerset; Lancastrian; (executed) Hexham	Richard Woodville; (executed) Edgecote	Edmund Beaufort; Duke of Somerset; Lancastrian; (executed) Tewkesbury	Margaret Beaufort	Humphrey Stafford	Henry Percy; Lancastrian †Towton	John Neville; Yorkist, then Lancastrian †Barnet	Richard Neville "Kingmaker"; Yorkist, then Lancastrian †Barnet
Margaret Beaufort; Lancastrian	Edmund Tudor; Lancastrian	Jasper Tudor; Duke of Bedford; Lancastrian	Catherine Woodville	Henry Stafford; Duke of Buckingham; Yorkist, then Lancastrian (executed)	Elizabeth Woodville	Edward IV; Duke of York, King of England r. 1461–1470, r. 1471–1483; Yorkist	George Plantagenet; Duke of Clarence; Yorkist, then Lancastrian; (executed) Tower	Edward of Westminster; Prince of Wales; Lancastrian †Tewkesbury	Anne Neville	Richard III; Duke of Gloucester, King of England r. 1483–1485; Yorkist †Bosworth Field
Henry VII; King of England; Lancastrian r. 1485–1509	Elizabeth of York	Edward V Prince of Wales, King of England r. 1483; Yorkist; (executed) Tower	Richard of Shrewsbury; Duke of York; (executed) Tower

== See also ==
- King Richard III Visitor Centre, Leicester
- Richard III Experience at Monk Bar, York
- Richard III Society

== Explanatory notes ==
Richard III of England House of York Cadet branch of the House of Plantagenet Born: 2 October 1452 Died: 22 August 1485
Regnal titles
Preceded by Edward V	King of England; Lord of Ireland; 1483–1485	Succeeded by Henry VII
Military offices
Preceded by William Neville, Earl of Kent	Lord High Admiral; 1462–1470	Succeeded by Richard Neville, Earl of Warwick
Preceded by Richard Neville, Earl of Warwick	Lord High Admiral; 1471–1483	Succeeded by John Howard, 1st Duke of Norfolk
Political offices
Preceded by Richard Woodville, 1st Earl Rivers	Lord High Constable; 1469–1470	Succeeded by John de Vere, 13th Earl of Oxford
Preceded by John de Vere, 13th Earl of Oxford	Lord High Constable; 1471–1483	Succeeded by Henry Stafford, 2nd Duke of Buckingham
