= Paul Murray Kendall =

American academic and historian (1911–1973)

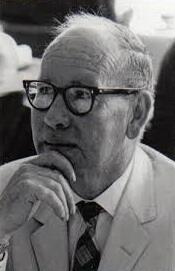
- Born: March 1, 1911; Philadelphia, Pennsylvania, U.S.
- Died: November 21, 1973 (aged 62)

Paul Murray Kendall (March 1, 1911 – November 21, 1973) was an American academic and historian, who taught for over 30 years at Ohio University and then, after his retirement, at the University of Kansas.

== Biography ==
Kendall was born in Philadelphia, Pennsylvania. He graduated from Frankford High School in 1928. He studied at the University of Virginia, receiving a bachelor's degree in 1932, and master's in 1933. In 1937, while studying for a Ph.D, he became an instructor in English at Ohio University in Athens, Ohio. He obtained a Ph.D. from the University of Virginia in 1939, and continued as professor at Ohio University, and was one of the first academics named as Distinguished Professor at Ohio University in 1959.

In 1939 Kendall married Carol Seeger (1917–2012), one of his former students. Carol Kendall was an author in her own right.

== Career ==
Kendall's teaching was primarily concerned with Renaissance writing and Shakespeare. He was granted tenure in 1947, and was appointed Distinguished Professor of English in 1959, one of the first three academics at Ohio University to receive this honor.

In 1950 Kendall was awarded a Marburgh Prize from Johns Hopkins University for a three-act play, The Ant Village. He published both light verse and scholarly articles. In 1952 he was awarded a Ford Foundation Fellowship which assisted him in completing Richard III, which was published in 1955, and raises anew the question whether or not that monarch was a usurper. It is for that work that he is best known. This work was a scholarly defence of the controversial monarch. It relied heavily on primary sources and made a significant contribution to the arguments for a favourable view of Richard. The work was critically very well received and was a runner-up for the National Book Award in 1956. Philippa Langley, who spearheaded the discovery of Richard III's remains, cited the book as the starting point for her interest in the monarch.

In 1957 Warwick the Kingmaker and History of Land Warfare were released. In 1963 The Yorkist Age was released. In 1970 Kendall retired from Ohio University to become head of the Shakespeare Institute at the University of Kansas. In 1971 his work, King Louis XI was published, the film by Henri Helman about Louis being clearly part of a rehabilitation movement driven, among others, by Kendall. In 1979 his novel, My Brother Chilperic, was published posthumously.

Paul Kendall died on November 21, 1973, aged 62. Kendall was survived by his wife and two daughters, Gillian Murray Kendall, who teaches Renaissance subjects and Shakespeare at Smith College in Massachusetts, and Caroline Kendall Orszak, who recently retired from a career in publishing in the UK, and lives in Western Massachusetts.

== Books ==
- Richard III (1955)
- Warwick the Kingmaker (1957)
- The Story of Land Warfare (1957)
- The Yorkist Age: Daily Life During the Wars of the Roses (1962)
- The Art of Biography (1965)
- Louis XI: The Universal Spider (1971)
- My Brother Chilperic (1979)

== Awards ==
- 1950 Marburgh Prize (Johns Hopkins University) for The Ant Village
- 1956 National Book Award runner-up for Richard III
- 1957-58 and 1961-62 Guggenheim Fellow
- 1970 Honorary L.H.D. (Doctor of Humane Letters) by Ohio University.

== See also ==
- Philippa Langley, whose interest in Richard III was inspired by Paul Murray Kendall
