= Richard III Society =

Society dedicated to research on Richard III of England

The Richard III Society
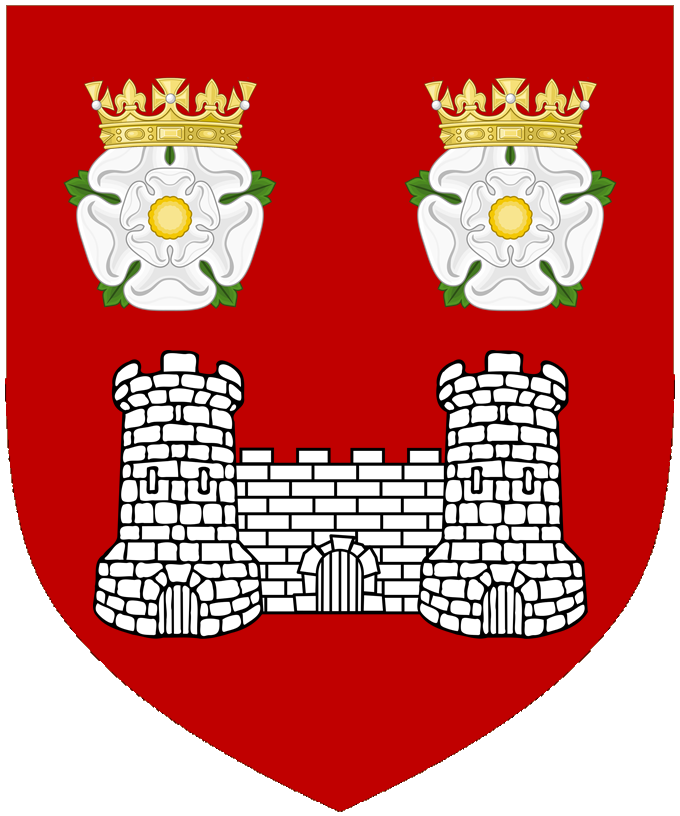
- The arms of the society, granted in 1989
- Formation: 1924; 102 years ago
- Founder: Dr. Saxon Barton
- Purpose: Reevaluation of the reputation and legacy of Richard III of England
- Patron: Prince Richard, Duke of Gloucester
- Publication: The Ricardian
- Website: richardiii.net
- Formerly called: The Fellowship of the White Boar

The Richard III Society is a Ricardian society dedicated to the re-assessment of the reputation of King Richard III, the last Plantagenet King of England and the last English king to be killed in battle, and whose reputation was widely maligned in the centuries since his death, in large part due to Tudor propaganda.

In 2012, the society gained worldwide attraction due to its role in the finding of King Richard's remains.

== History ==
The society was founded in 1924 by Liverpool surgeon Samuel Saxon Barton (1892-1957) as The Fellowship of the White Boar, Richard's badge and a symbol of the Yorkist army in the Wars of the Roses. Its membership was originally a small group of interested amateur historians whose aim was to bring about a re-assessment of the reputation of Richard III.

The society became moribund during the Second World War. In 1951, Josephine Tey published her detective novel The Daughter of Time, in which Richard's guilt is examined and doubted. In 1955, Laurence Olivier released his film of Shakespeare's Richard III, which at the beginning admitted that the play was based on legend, and a sympathetic, detailed biography of Richard was published by Paul Murray Kendall, all of which went some way towards re-invigorating the society.

The Fellowship of the White Boar was renamed The Richard III Society in 1959.

In 1980, Prince Richard, Duke of Gloucester, became the society's Patron. Richard III was Duke of Gloucester before ascending the throne, therefore he was before his accession (Prince) Richard, Duke of Gloucester.

In 1986, the society established the Richard III and Yorkist History Trust, a registered charity, to advance research and publication related to the history of late medieval England.

Since 1974 the society has published a scholarly journal, The Ricardian, which is edited by the historian Joanna Laynesmith. The former editor was Anne F. Sutton. The society also publishes a quarterly members' magazine, The Ricardian Bulletin. To mark its centenary year the society published a new official history written by John Saunders, entitled The Ricardian Century: A History of the Richard III Society.

In 2025 the society launched a podcast, The Ricardian Podcast, presented by the journalist Alec Marsh.

== Rediscovery of Richard III's remains ==
In 2012, the society, working in partnership with the University of Leicester and Leicester City Council, exhumed a skeleton at the site of the former Greyfriars Church that was later confirmed to be that of the King.

Philippa Langley, the secretary of the Scottish Branch of the Richard III Society, inaugurated the quest for King Richard's lost grave as part of her ongoing research into the controversial monarch. Her project marked the first-ever search for the grave of an anointed King of England, and in 2013 was made into an acclaimed TV documentary Richard III: King In A Car Park by Darlow Smithson Productions for Channel 4.

Langley and Ricardian historian John Ashdown-Hill were awarded the MBE in recognition of their services to "the Exhumation and Identification of Richard III" (London Gazette) in the 2015 Queen's Birthday Honours.

In 2022 the story of Philippa Langley and the rediscovery of Richard III’s remains were made into the feature film The Lost King directed by Stephen Frears.

Coat of arms of Richard III Society

Crest
A seated boar Argent hoofed and bristled Or one foot on a terrestrial globe the other supporting a banner of St George.
Escutcheon
Gules in chief two roses Argent each ensigned with an ancient crown Or in base a castle Argent.

== See also ==
- Ricardian (Richard III)
