= The Lost King =

British 2022 comedy-drama film

- Theatrical release poster
- Directed by: Stephen Frears
- Screenplay by: Steve Coogan; Jeff Pope
- Based on: The King's Grave: The Search for Richard III by Philippa Langley; Michael Jones
- Produced by: Steve Coogan; Christine Langan; Dan Winch
- Starring: Sally Hawkins; Steve Coogan; Harry Lloyd; Mark Addy; Lee Ingleby; James Fleet
- Cinematography: Zac Nicholson
- Edited by: Pia Di Ciaula
- Music by: Alexandre Desplat
- Production companies: Pathé; BBC Film; Ingenious Media; Creative Scotland; Baby Cow Productions; BFI
- Distributed by: Warner Bros. Pictures
- Release dates: 10 September 2022 (TIFF); 7 October 2022 (UK)
- Running time: 108 minutes
- Country: United Kingdom
- Language: English
- Box office: $4.5 million

The Lost King is a 2022 British biographical film directed by Stephen Frears. Written by Steve Coogan and Jeff Pope, it is based on the 2013 book The King's Grave: The Search for Richard III by Philippa Langley and Michael Jones. It is a dramatisation of the story of Philippa Langley (Sally Hawkins), the woman who initiated the search to find King Richard III's remains under a car park in Leicester, and her treatment by the University of Leicester in the claiming of credit for the discovery. Coogan and Harry Lloyd also feature in the cast.

The Lost King was produced by Pathé, Baby Cow, BBC Film and Ingenious Media, and distributed by Pathé in France and Switzerland as a standalone distributor, and in the UK via Warner Bros. Pictures. The film premiered at the 47th Toronto International Film Festival on 10 September 2022 and was released in the United Kingdom on 7 October. The Lost King received generally positive reviews from critics, although part of the film was later ruled to be defamatory in its depiction of Richard Taylor, with a settlement being reached and set out in a Tomlin order on 24 October 2025, and there have been critiques of its framing or veracity.

== Plot ==
Living in Edinburgh, Philippa Langley loses a work promotion to a less experienced and younger co-worker. She unsuccessfully confronts her male boss about being passed over and also appeals that her myalgic encephalomyelitis (or "ME") has never affected her work. Distraught, her ex-husband John, who helps with their two teenage boys, tells her to keep her job as they need the money.

Philippa attends the play Richard III, and identifies with Richard whom she feels was unfairly maligned as a hunchback, child killer, and usurper. She begins to have visions of Richard who appears to her. She joins the local Richard III Society who believe he was unfairly vilified by Tudor propagandists.

Philippa stops going to work, manages her ME with medication, and begins talking to her Richard III apparition. Her research shows some sources say he was buried in 1485 in the Leicester Greyfriars priory choir area, while others say his body was thrown into the River Soar. After Greyfriars was demolished in the 1530s Reformation, Leicester mayor Robert Herrick had a shrine built in his garden around the year 1600 saying "Here lies the body of Richard III, sometime king of England."

Philippa attends a lecture in Leicester on Richard, lying to her ex-husband about it being a work trip. She meets Dr Ashdown-Hill, who is publishing a genetic genealogy study on a Canadian direct descendant of Richard III's sister. He tells her to look for Richard in open spaces in Leicester because people for centuries have avoided building over old abbeys. While walking around Leicester looking for the ancient site of Greyfriars, and seeing apparitions of Richard, she gets a strong feeling that an "R" painted on a car park is the site of Richard's grave. Returning home, she confesses her activities to John.

Philippa contacts University of Leicester archaeologist Richard Buckley, who dismisses her ideas, but when the university cuts his funding, he gets back to her. Buckley finds an old map of Leicester marking Robert Herrick's property, showing a possible public shrine in his garden. They overlay a modern map of Leicester and find that the shrine may be in the middle of the car park that Philippa had felt strongly about.

Philippa and Buckley team up. She pitches it to Leicester City Council. Richard Taylor of the University of Leicester advises that her amateur "feeling" is too risky. The Council still approves her plan for the publicity, but when ground-radar finds nothing, funding drops out. She turns to the Richard III Society to crowd-fund her "Looking For Richard", and the money comes in from around the world to fund the excavation of three trenches.

On day one of the dig, Buckley tells Langley that the dig certificate has been signed, but does not tell her that her name has been omitted. Philippa gets Buckley to start trench one at the painted "R" spot, and they immediately find the legs of a skeleton. Buckley thinks it is an extramural graveyard for monks. Philippa confronts Taylor onsite for now falsely claiming credit for leading the project. While still only on day one of the dig, she insists on stopping all work to focus on the skeleton in trench one. Buckley angrily relents and goes home while the crew digs the skeleton. The osteologist soon sees that it is indeed Richard III, a 30-year-old male with a significantly curved spine and a death blow to the skull.

After the success of the first day of digging, the University of Leicester leaders rush in to take over the project. They re-hire Buckley. In February 2013, Taylor announces their findings to the world at a University of Leicester press conference, at which Phillippa is largely sidelined, even by Buckley. Buckley is later given an honorary doctorate by the university.

Richard appears to Philippa a final time at Bosworth Field; he thanks her, and rides off. Richard is shown getting a funeral fit for a king in Leicester Cathedral. The closing credits say the royal family's website has reinstated Richard as the rightful King of England 1483–1485, so that he is no longer regarded as an usurper. Langley was awarded an MBE for her work.

== Cast ==
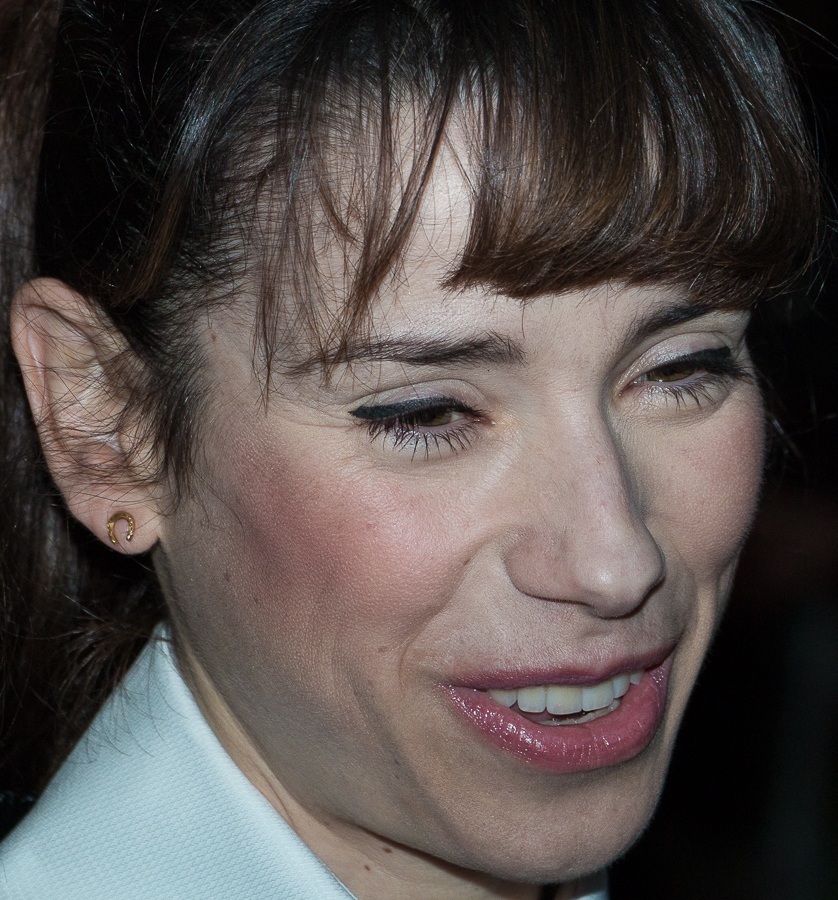
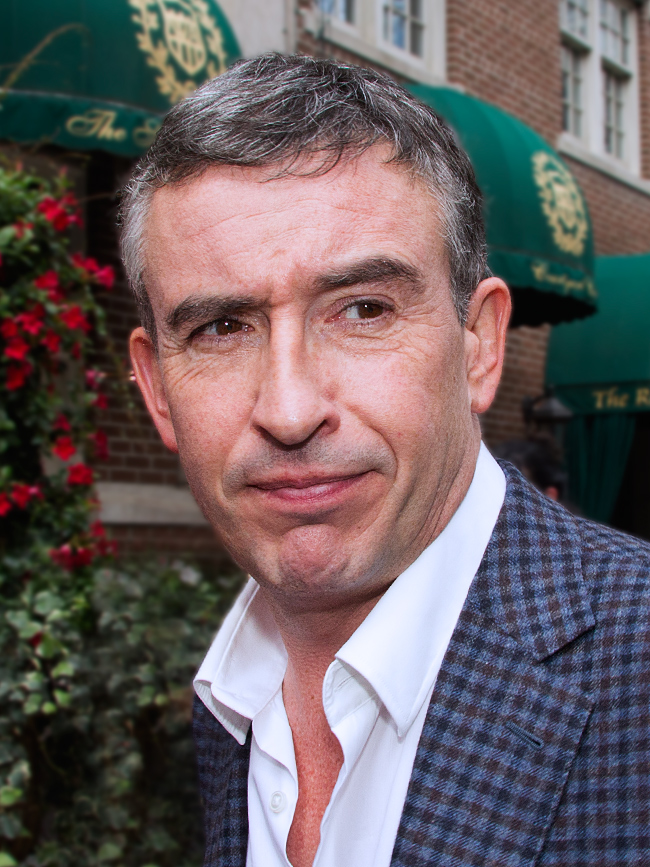
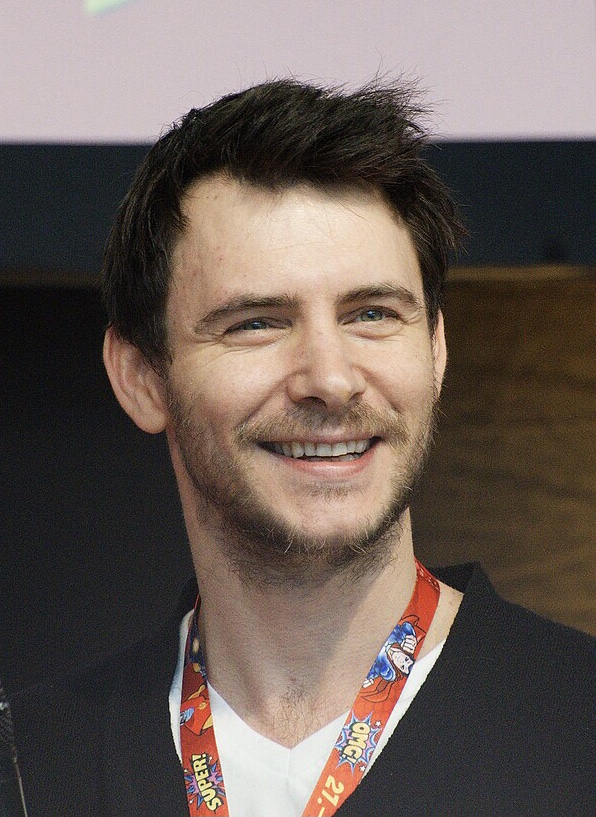
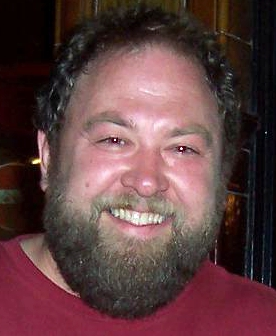
(Clockwise) The Lost King stars Sally Hawkins, Steve Coogan, Mark Addy and Harry Lloyd.
- Sally Hawkins as Philippa Langley; who suffers from a disabling chronic fatigue syndrome and whose marriage is broken, becomes obsessed with Richard III, joins the local Richard III Society, and embarks on a quest to find and exhume his body.
- Steve Coogan as John Langley; Philippa's estranged husband, who later supports her quest and reconciles with her moving back in with the family.
- Harry Lloyd as King Richard III, and as Pete, an actor who plays the lead in a performance of Richard III attended by Langley; Richard III appears to Philippa and speaks with her throughout the film, although his final appearance in the film is at the re-burial ceremony as the actor with his little daughter.
- Mark Addy as Richard Buckley; the University of Leicester Archaeological Services (ULAS) archaeologist in charge of the dig who initially supports Langley but later lets her down by not sufficiently acknowledging her central importance to the project; Buckley is granted an honorary doctorate by the University of Leicester and the closing credits state that Langley got the MBE for her work (whereas Buckley got a superior OBE).
- Lee Ingleby as Richard Taylor; the deputy registrar from the University of Leicester who is portrayed as being initially obstructive and dismissive of Langley's project, but who later is an enthusiastic supporter, and who omits Langley from the press conference announcing the results to the world.
- James Fleet as John Ashdown-Hill; the medieval historian who tells Langley that Greyfriars would likely be under open ground (i.e. such as a car park) and that he has tracked down a living direct descendant of Richard III in Canada who could be used for DNA-verification of any bones discovered.
- Bruce Fummey as Hamish; a member of the Richard III Society who encourages Langley to follow her dreams and undertake her own research.
- Amanda Abbington as Sheila Lock, the chair of the Leicester City Council (LCC) funding committee, and CEO of the LCC, who supports Langley's dig.

Also appearing are: Jessica Hardwick as Bookseller, Robert Jack as Alex, John-Paul Hurley as Buckingham, Nomaan Khan as Anil, Sinead MacInnes as Hiker, Phoebe Pryce as Jo Appleby, Alasdair Hankinson as Mathew Morris, James Rottger as Richmond, Benjamin Scanlan as Raife Langley, Mahesh Patel as Foreign Dignitary (uncredited), Sharon Osdin as Buckley's PA, Glenna Morrison as Lorna, Adam Robb as Max Langley, Simon Donaldson as Graham, Kern Falconer as Ken, Violet Hughes as School Girl 1, Josie O'Brien as School Girl 2, Robert Maloney as Heckling Bar Customer (uncredited), Lukas Svoboda as Car Seller (uncredited), Iman Akhtar as Receptionist, Lati Gbaja as Shopper (uncredited).

Philippa Langley makes a cameo appearance at the end of the film as Woman Attending the Re-Burial of Richard III (uncredited).

== Production ==
In November 2020, it was announced that Stephen Frears was set to direct the film, based on a screenplay written by Steve Coogan and Jeff Pope, and co-starring Coogan. In March 2021, it was announced that Sally Hawkins had joined the cast as Philippa Langley. Principal photography began in April of that year, and took place across a variety of locations in the Edinburgh area, including Morningside and Dalkeith.

== Release ==
The film premiered at the 47th Toronto International Film Festival, and was released in UK cinemas on 7 October 2022. IFC Films had acquired U.S. distribution rights to the film. It was then released in the US the following year on 24 March 2023.

== Reception ==
=== Critical response ===
On the review aggregator website Rotten Tomatoes, 77% of 124 critics' reviews are positive, with an average rating of 6.5/10. The website's consensus reads: "The movie's curiously bland compared to the remarkable real-life story it dramatizes, but Sally Hawkins' performance saves The Lost King from feeling like a royal disappointment." Metacritic, which uses a weighted average, assigned a score of 64 out of 100 based on 32 critics, indicating "generally favourable reviews".

Hawkins' performance was met with critical acclaim. The Evening Standard's four-star review stated "Sally Hawkins is Oscar-worthy". Likewise, Heat and iNews gave the film four out of five stars, with the latter stating "Coogan is marvellous". Peter Bradshaw of The Guardian gave the film two stars out of five, commenting on the "uneven" nature of the script and that scenes with Richard III "make the film odd and unrelaxed", while these scenes were praised in Matthew McMillan's four-star review for The Upcoming, for imbuing the film "with an offbeat allure", describing the film as "a treat […] spearheaded by Hawkins's performance, and guided by the dexterity of Frears's craft". The film made The Guardian readers' "best films of 2022 list" with the reviewer stating "As a lecturer myself, I particularly enjoyed the way the film pricked the bubble of academic arrogance". Kyle Smith in the Wall Street Journal praised the film saying, "As it ticks along from one small but crucial development to another, this climax is far more exciting than any part of any superhero movie I've seen in recent months". In March 2023, the New York Times added the film to its "Critic's Pick" list. Sally Hawkins' performance was nominated for a BIFA in 2022. The film itself was longlisted by BIFA in 2023 for the Outstanding British Film category.

=== Reception by the University of Leicester ===
Based on the trailer, some of the lead University of Leicester archaeologists involved in the story did not feel that the film's presentation as "the true story" was correct and that it had under-represented their involvement in the project. Langley contends that the archaeologists took undue credit for finding the remains of Richard III given that she had led the search, raised the funding for the dig and commissioned the archaeologists. Following the UK première of the film the University of Leicester issued a press release, including the following abstract:

We worked closely with Philippa Langley throughout the project, and she was not sidelined by the University. Indeed, she formed part of the team interview panel for every single press conference connected to the King.

The suggested whereabouts of the King's remains was public knowledge prior to Philippa's intervention, however, we recognise she was the positive driving force behind the decision to dig for Richard III.

Langley issued a rebuttal, calling the university's statement "misleading":

Contrary to the misleading media statement issued by the University, I did feel side-lined (and continue to feel side-lined) by the University wrongly taking my credit for leading the search for the King's remains. The only press conference that mattered was the one on 4 February 2013 to confirm that the remains were those of Richard III. That conference was the one attended by the world's media. I was not invited by the University to sit on the panel that faced the journalists and the University wrongly presented themselves as leading the search that I had commissioned and paid for. It is true the University invited me to address the conference but as the 13th of 13 speakers, long after the live TV news feed had ended.

As for the general whereabouts of the extensive Greyfriars precinct – where some (not all) believed Richard III might be buried – yes this was known, but no one knew the layout of the buildings and therefore where the Greyfriars Church itself (and therefore the body of the King) might be (if he wasn't in the River Soar as most leading historians then believed). Only through my intuition and research was the precise area identified where the dig should take place. In a matter of hours of starting to dig, the King's remains were revealed. If the University (and everyone else) knew exactly where to dig, why hadn't they done so before?

Richard Taylor said to the BBC:

I'm portrayed as kind of a bullying, cynical, double-crossing, devious manipulator which is bad, but then when you add to that I behave in a sexist way and a way that seems to mock Richard III's disabilities, you start to get into the realm of defamation.

The filmmakers responded to Taylor by saying:

The university's version of events has been extensively documented over the past 10 years. Philippa's recollection of events, as corroborated by the filmmakers' research, is very different.

=== Reception by other archaeologists ===
British archaeologist and academic Mike Pitts, who had written Digging for Richard III: The Search for the Lost King in 2015 with the team from the University of Leicester archaeology department, described the film as "a misleading saga based on a farrago of untruths and omissions". He says that by showing a "phalanx of male archaeologists and administrators, interested only in furthering their own careers at Langley's expense", the film portrays science unfairly, and in a manner that is closed to outsiders. Pitts later responded angrily to the film's review in The Guardian readers' "best films of 2022 list" where it was praised for having "pricked the bubble of academic arrogance", responding to the newspaper that: "Contrary to movie PR and most media coverage, however, its key thread is fiction: the 'bubble of academic arrogance' is a fantasy of the film's anti-intellectual agenda".

== Richard Taylor's legal action ==
In February 2024, Richard Taylor initiated legal action for libel against Steve Coogan, the production company Baby Cow, and the distributors Pathé, about his portrayal in The Lost King. Taylor claimed his character, as played by Lee Ingleby, was depicted in a highly negative "patronising and misogynistic" manner, and that the film suggested he took credit for the discovery and failed to acknowledge Langley's contribution.

On 14 June 2024, a high court judge ruled that the portrayal of Taylor in the film was defamatory. The judge, Clive Lewis, noted that the character was consistently depicted negatively throughout the film. Although Lewis rejected Taylor's argument that the portrayal suggested misogyny or sexism, he concluded that the film's overall depiction would lead a reasonable viewer to believe that Taylor had misrepresented facts to the media and the public, had marginalised Langley's role, and had behaved in a smug, dismissive and patronising manner. The ruling allowed the case to proceed to a full trial, requiring Coogan, Baby Cow and Pathé to defend the portrayal of Taylor in the film.

The case was settled and set out in a Tomlin order in the High Court in October 2025, the producers agreeing to pay Taylor "substantial damages" and his legal costs, and to add an onscreen clarification at the start of the film that the film character "Taylor" is fictional, and that the real Richard Taylor "acted with integrity during the events portrayed."

Coogan subsequently offered to "debate with Richard Taylor in a public forum on all the issues surrounding this saga".

== See also ==
- The Dig, a 2021 drama film based on the 1939 excavation of Sutton Hoo in Suffolk, England.
