= Philippa Langley =

British writer, producer, and Ricardian

Philippa Langley MBE
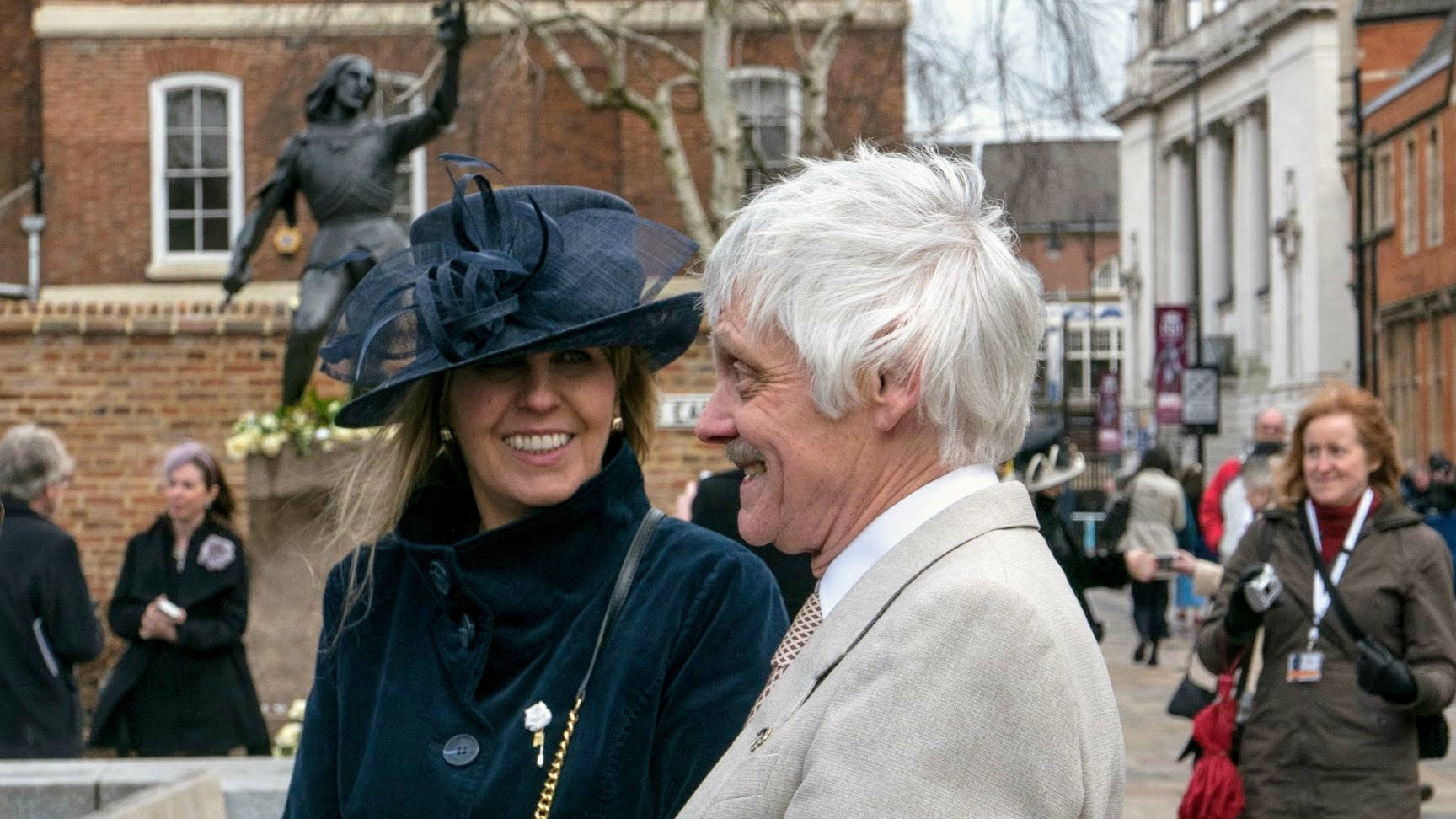
- Philippa Langley in March 2015
- Born: 29 June 1962 (age 64); British Kenya
- Education: Hummersknott School, Queen Elizabeth Sixth Form College
- Occupations: Writer and producer
- Organization: Richard III Society
- Known for: Discovery and exhumation of Richard III
- Notable work: The Princes in the Tower: How History’s Greatest Cold Case was Solved (2025); The Princes in the Tower: Solving History’s Greatest Cold Case (2023); The Lost King: The Search for Richard III (2022); Finding Richard III: The Official Account of Research by the Retrieval & Reburial Project (2014); The King's Grave: The Search for Richard III (2013)
- Television: The Princes in the Tower: The New Evidence (2023); Richard III: The Unseen Story (2013); Richard III: The King in the Car Park (2013)
- Spouse: John Langley (separated)
- Children: 2
- Awards: Robert Hamblin Award; RTS Award (History)
- Honours: MBE
- Website: www.philippalangley.co.uk

Philippa Jayne Langley MBE (born 29 June 1962) is a Kenyan-born British writer, producer, and Ricardian, who is best known for her role in the discovery and 2012 exhumation of Richard III, as part of the Looking for Richard project, for which she was awarded an MBE. Langley has written books and appeared in film-length documentaries on the search for Richard III and was portrayed in the 2022 film The Lost King.

== Early life ==
Langley was born in British Kenya and at the age of two moved with her parents to Blackwell, in Darlington, England. In Darlington, she attended Hummersknott School, and Queen Elizabeth Sixth Form College, and embarked on a career in marketing, eventually settling in Edinburgh.

== Looking for Richard project ==
Langley's interest in Richard III began in 1998, when she read American historian Paul Murray Kendall's biography of the king, saying: "it just blew me away. I thought, this is a man whose real story has never been told on screen, never". Langley had been diagnosed with myalgic encephalomyelitis and had abandoned her job in marketing to write a screenplay about Richard III more aligned with historians such as Kendall. Langley formed the Scottish branch of the Richard III Society. In May 2004, she visited various sites in Leicester associated with Richard III, including the three car-parks identified in 1975 as possible burial locations. (Note: In 1975, Ricardian Audrey Strange in an article published by the Richard III Society journal, listed three car parks near Leicester County Council's offices as the most likely sites for Richard's remains.) Langley entered the Social Services car park, and at the northern end felt a "strange sensation" come over her, saying "I knew in my innermost being that Richard's body lay there". In 2005, on completing her first draft, she returned to the car park and experienced the same feeling; when she looked down, someone had painted a reserved "R" over the space; she recounted "it told me all I needed to know".

In 2005, Langley engaged with John Ashdown-Hill, who had traced Richard's mitochondrial DNA to a living relative in Canada, thus enabling the identification of any remains. A 2007 dig that failed to find Greyfriars, a possible burial site, prompted further research by Langley, Ashdown-Hill, and independently by Annette Carson, which narrowed the location of Greyfriars to the Social Services car park. In February 2009, at the Cramond Inn in Edinburgh, Langley formed the Looking for Richard project to get the car park excavated, with Dr. David and Wendy Johnson, and later Ashdown-Hill and Carson, and chair of the Richard III Society, Dr. Phil Stone.

In late 2010, Langley won the backing of Leicester City Council (LCC) CEO Sheila Lock for a dig and television documentary to promote Leicester's association with Richard III; if any remains were found, they were to be buried in Leicester Cathedral. LCC would not provide direct funding, but as owners of the car park, they were able to approve and license the excavations, and introduce Langley to local state sponsors, particularly Leicestershire Promotions. Langley contracted the University of Leicester Archaeological Services (ULAS) to do the excavations. In August 2011, inconclusive ground penetrating radar results led to withdrawals of sponsorship. Langley led an online crowdfunding appeal to worldwide Richard III Society members, who filled the gap and provided £17,367 of the £32,867 cost for the 2-week excavation. (Note: The 2-week excavation commissioned by Langley and the Looking for Richard project, cost £32,867, and was funded by the Richard III Society members (£17,367), Leicester University (£10,000), Leicestershire Promotions (now LPL Tourism Services) (£5,000), and Leicester Adult Schools (£500).) On 25 August 2012, three days after the 527th anniversary of Richard III's death, the ULAS team commenced the excavation, and after a few hours osteoarchaeologist Jo Appleby uncovered a skeleton identifying spinal abnormalities which was later confirmed through DNA testing, led by Leicester University's Professor Turi King to be the remains of Richard III.

=== Disagreement with the University of Leicester ===
On 4 February 2013, the University of Leicester presented their results to the world's press. Langley felt sidelined at this presentation. Her name was also not on the exhumation licence as client because there wasn't room. This, combined with a clerical error processing the form, also led to a legal action by the Plantagenet Alliance that lasted several years.

In late 2022, the situation flared up with the release of The Lost King, a dramatisation of Langley's search. At the film's release, director Stephen Frears said: "They [the University] put a poster on the side of a bus saying 'We found the king!'", and "Well, Leicester University is a corporation and this is really about corporatism". The University issued statements rebutting aspects of the dramatisation in the film, while Langley, and the film's producers, issued their own rebuttals, with Frears saying: "nothing has turned up yet which makes me think we got something wrong".

The Richard III Society released a statement in support of the film, including the recognition of Langley and Ashdown-Hill's roles in the discovery, and the recognition of the importance of the financial commitment that worldwide members of the Society made to the success of the project.

On 14 June 2024, a UK high court judge ruled that the portrayal of academic Richard Taylor in the film was defamatory. The judge, Mr Justice Lewis, noted that the character was consistently depicted negatively throughout the film. Although the judge rejected Taylor's argument that the portrayal suggested misogyny or sexism, he concluded that the film's overall depiction would lead a reasonable viewer to believe that Taylor had misrepresented facts to the media and the public, had marginalised Langley's role, and had behaved in a smug, dismissive and patronising manner. The ruling allowed the case to proceed to a full trial, which would require Steve Coogan, Baby Cow, and Pathé to defend the portrayal of Taylor in the film, but on 27 October 2025 the parties reached an agreement including a financial settlement for Taylor and a statement at the front of the film clarifying that he had acted with integrity throughout the events depicted and that his portrayal in the film is fictional.

== Other projects ==
=== Hidden Abbey Project ===
In 2014, Langley started a project to locate the remains of Henry I of England, who was buried at Reading Abbey, but which later fell into ruin, which became the "Hidden Abbey Project". In 2020, Langley said that she believed that the grave of Henry I was beneath the western car park of the former Reading gaol. In 2021, Charles Spencer, 9th Earl Spencer joined the crowdfunding programme to begin excavating the site. In 2023, Langley was raising the estimated £55,000 needed for an excavation of the car park.

=== Missing Princes Project ===
In 2022, Langley led "The Missing Princes Project" to discover the fate of the Princes in the Tower. The project began in 2015, following the reburial of Richard III in Leicester and was formally launched in July the following year. In 2023 she claimed to have discovered new evidence that disproved the theory that Richard III was responsible for the deaths of the princes. Along with Rob Rinder, she hosted a Channel 4 programme called Princes in the Tower: The New Evidence, in which she revealed her own theories and new archival discoveries. Although praising Langley's discoveries, The Spectator's reviewer called the programme "a calculated insult to the viewer"; The Times called it "compelling" and awarded the documentary its "Critics Choice." The programme achieved a large audience with Richard III and the Princes in the Tower trending on Twitter. The Richard III Society issued a press release stating:

The disappearance of the princes has always been described as a great unsolved mystery. Why? Because there was no evidence of their fate. Their murder was never more than conjecture, but it was put about by the authorities and – for safety’s sake – only the brave dared to think differently. From now on, history must take account of this new breakthrough evidence. No longer can anyone confidently claim the princes were killed by Richard III.

Three leading members of the Dutch Research Group who had assisted in the project subsequently distanced themselves from Langley's documentary and book, arguing that the documents they had discovered "are in our own opinion open to various interpretations and do not constitute irrefutable proof" for the survival of the princes. Langley responded that her conclusions were based on "the totality of evidence thus assembled and the outcomes of a modern police missing person investigation methodology ... (and not through a traditional historical research method)". Historian Michael Hicks similarly opined that the new documents "do add to knowledge of the Tudor impostors, but they fall short of proof that either Edward V or Richard Duke of York survived beyond their disappearance in the autumn of 1483". Langley again responded that her use of "police investigative methodology" had provided "sufficient reason to conclude" that the two had survived the reign of Richard III.

In November 2024, the Princes in the Tower documentary was given the Association for International Broadcasting (AIB) award for "Best Historical Documentary".

In May 2025, Langley and her Missing Princes Project team published new archival proof of life discoveries for both Princes, bringing the project to its ten-year conclusion. The title of Langley’s book was updated to reflect the new discoveries and that her belief that the mystery had been solved.

== As writer and producer ==
From August 2011 to February 2013, Langley acted as associate producer of the Channel 4 documentary film, Richard III: The King in the Car Park. It won the 2013 Royal Television Society award for History, and was nominated for the 2014 BAFTA award for Specialist Factual. The film was the highest rated specialist factual documentary in Channel 4's history, and led to the follow-up short-documentary film, Richard III: The Unseen Story.

In 2013, Langley co-authored with military historian Michael K. Jones, The King's Grave: The Search for Richard III (the first edition was published in New York with the title The King’s Grave: The Discovery of Richard III's Lost Burial Place and the Clues It Holds).

In 2013, it was reported that Langley hoped her completed screenplay on Richard III would become a film, with Richard portrayed by English actor Richard Armitage. She had titled her screenplay, Blood Royal, and based it on Bosworth 1485: Psychology of a Battle, by Michael K. Jones.

In 2014, Langley detailed the years of research behind the Looking For Richard project that took her to the northern end of the car park in Leicester in search of the church and grave in Finding Richard III: The Official Account of Research by the Retrieval & Reburial Project. The co-authored work includes chapters from Looking For Richard project members, John Ashdown-Hill and David and Wendy Johnson, and was edited by Annette Carson.

In 2022, Langley and Jones re-wrote and expanded their 2013 book under the new title, The Lost King: The Search for Richard III. It was released alongside the film, The Lost King, with Stephen Frears, Steve Coogan and Jeff Pope writing the screenplay, and Sally Hawkins playing Langley. In 2023, Langley was associate Producer and co-presenter (with Rob Rinder) for the Channel 4 and PBS documentary The Princes in the Tower: The New Evidence (Brinkworth Productions, 18 November, PBS ‘Secrets of the Dead’ (S.21, Ep.3): 22 November). The show was followed by the publication of Langley’s new book: The Princes in the Tower: Solving History’s Greatest Cold Case (The History Press, UK, Pegasus, USA, 19 November). Based on the totality of evidence from the five-year investigation of The Missing Princes Project, Langley concludes that the mystery surrounding the Princes in the Tower is ‘now solved’. The book reveals how both Princes (Edward V, 12, and Richard, Duke of York, 9,) survived the reign of Richard III to each challenge Henry VII for the throne of England. In 2025 a new edition of the Princes book was published to mark the project’s ten-year conclusion. With further archival discoveries made supporting the continued lives of both Princes the book’s title, The Princes in the Tower: How History’s Greatest Cold Case Was Solved, was updated to reflect the project’s conclusion.

== Personal life ==
Prior to the discovery, Langley was diagnosed with myalgic encephalomyelitis (ME), which meant that she had to spend days building up her "sleep-bank" before making excursions to Leicester while researching locations for Richard III's remains.

She was married but later separated from her husband, John Langley; they have two sons. In 2022, Steve Coogan, who plays John Langley in The Lost King said "... they've got a very interesting relationship because they're not married anymore, but they both still love each other, and they're still in each other's lives", and "I've never seen that depicted on screen before ... and I wanted to just show that."

== Awards and honours ==
- In October 2021, Langley became a Fellow of the Richard III Society.
- On Tuesday 18 March 2014, Langley received the Royal Television Society (RTS) Award for the History category for the Specialist Factual documentary Richard III: The King in the Car Park (Channel 4, Darlow Smithson Productions, 2 February 2013). Award citation: “The winning programme created headlines around the world, and vividly portrayed the application of forensic science to a major historical mystery. It was presented with huge gusto, authority and sense of event.”
- In June 2015, Langley was appointed a Member of the Order of the British Empire (MBE) in the Queen's 2015 Birthday Honours for "services to the exhumation and identification of Richard III"; her colleague John Ashdown-Hill was also recognised with an MBE at the same time.
- In March 2015, Leicester Cathedral dedicated the poem Richard that they had commissioned from the poet laureate, Carol Ann Duffy, and which was read by Benedict Cumberbatch at King Richard III's burial, to Langley.
- In April 2014, a blue plaque was erected at the Cramond Inn to mark where Langley created the Looking for Richard project on 21 February 2009.
- In March 2013, she was awarded Honorary Life Membership of the Richard III Society.
- In October 2012, she was awarded the Robert Hamblin Award by the Richard III Society.

== In film ==
- Langley featured, and acted as co-producer, in the 2013 Channel 4 award-winning documentary film, Richard III: The King in the Car Park.
- Langley featured, and acted as co-producer, in the 2013 Channel 4 follow-up short documentary film, Richard III: The Unseen Story.
- Langley was played by Sally Hawkins in the 2022 comedy-drama film, The Lost King, a dramatisation of her search for Richard III. Langley appears in a cameo appearance in the cathedral during the reburial.
- In November 2023 she presented The Princes in the Tower: The New Evidence on Channel 4 with Robert Rinder.

== Bibliography ==
- Langley, Philippa; Jones, Michael K. (2013). The King's Grave: The Discovery of Richard III's Lost Burial Place and the Clues It Holds (New York ed.). St. Martin's Press. ISBN 978-1-250-04410-5.
- Langley, Philippa; Jones, Michael K. (2013). The King's Grave: The Search for Richard III (London ed.). John Murray. ISBN 978-1-84854-893-0.
- Ashdown-Hill, John; David Johnson; Wendy Johnson; Philippa Langley (2014). Carson, Annette (ed.). Finding Richard III: The Official Account of Research by the Retrieval & Reburial Project. Horstead: Imprimis Imprimatur. ISBN 978-0-9576840-2-7.
- Langley, Philippa; Jones, Michael K. (2022). The Lost King: The Search for Richard III. John Murray. ISBN 978-1-399-80262-8.
- Langley, Philippa (November 2023). The Princes in the Tower: Solving History's Greatest Cold Case. The History Press. ISBN 978-1-80399-541-0.
- Langley, Philippa (May 2025). The Princes in the Tower: How History's Greatest Cold Case Was Solved. The History Press. ISBN 978-1-803-99955-5.

== See also ==
- King Richard III Visitor Centre, Leicester City
- Richard III Experience at Monk Bar, City of York
- Ricardian (Richard III)
