= Tudor myth =

Tradition in English history, historiography and literature

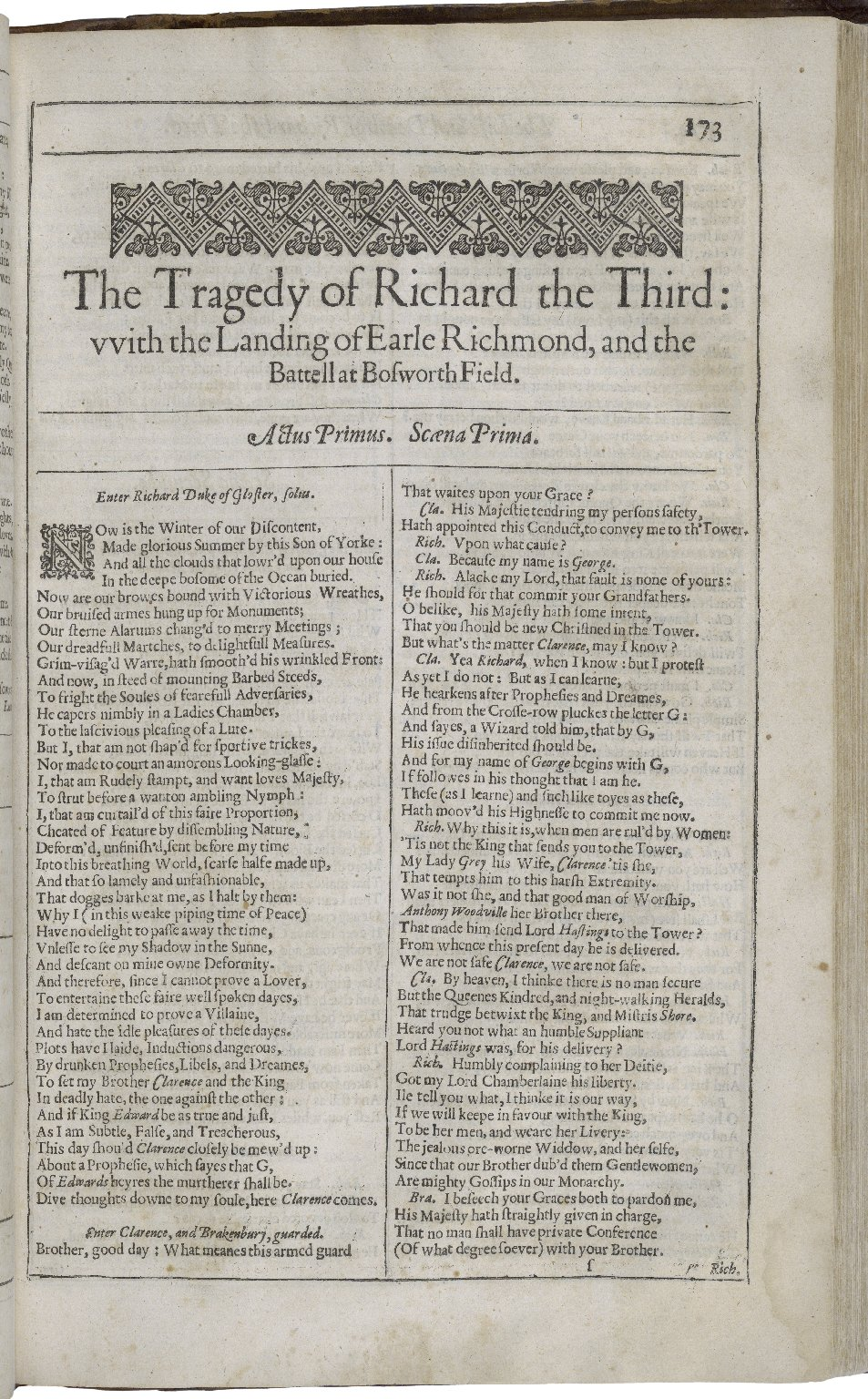
The first page of Richard III, printed in the Second Folio of 1632

The Tudor myth is the tradition in English history, historiography and literature that presents the 15th century, including the Wars of the Roses, in England as a dark age of anarchy and bloodshed. The narrative that the Tudor myth perpetrated was curated with the political purpose of promoting the Tudor period of the 16th century as a golden age of peace, law, order, and prosperity. The hope was to elevate King Henry VII's rulership compared to his predecessors.

The Tudor myth may have also been advanced by the Tudors and their confederates due to the poor financial conditions of the populace in the 16th century as opposed to the 15th century. In Thomas Lambert's Richard III, the Tudor Myth, and the Transition from Feudalism to Capitalism, he argues that the 16th century had "...poorer economic performance and higher taxation during the Tudor reign compared to the previous century..."

The Tudor myth was made to elevate King Henry VII (a Lancastrian by relation), by ruining King Richard II and King Richard III. Throughout the 16th century, Richard II would be vilified and portrayed as a terrible leader and traitor to the English monarchy. Richard III (and by extension, Yorkist loyalties) is portrayed as an irredeemable tyrant to legitimize Tudor rule. The most popular rendition gained notoriety due to Shakespeare's play, Richard III, in which King Richard III's moral character is berated.

== In Shakespeare's plays ==
=== Richard III ===
Shakespeare's plays were both a product of and a contributor to the Tudor myth and King Richard III's portrayal. His play was written in hindsight, since he was aware of the events that followed King Richard III's reign. With this information in mind, Shakespeare set out to disparage King Richard III's character, as exemplified in his portrayal of Richard Richard III of England (1452–1485; reigned, 1483–1485) as a deformed hunchback and murderer. Historian Thomas More was one of the first to spread this characterisation of King Richard III. William Shakespeare picked up on the rumour and continued this tradition through his history plays that covered the 15th century including Richard II, Henry IV, Part 1, Henry IV, Part 2, Henry V, Henry VI, Part 1, Henry VI, Part 2, Henry VI, Part 3, and Richard III. Though scholars and historians, such as Horace Walpole and Sir George Buck denounced this portrayal of the king during the seventeenth and eighteenth centuries, Shakespeare's description of King Richard III remained the most well-known depiction of him in British/Commonwealth-American historical writing up until the twentieth century.

This view of King Richard III was perpetuated by the revisionist historian Paul Murray Kendall, author of Richard III (1956), in which Shakespeare's portrayal is brought to life. Kendall's film also garnered more attention to King Richard III's reputation in general, and many historians would begin to explore the validity of Shakespeare's and the Tudor's portrayal of the king.

Though this portrayal of King Richard III is widely accepted, many, such as Merry England chose to provide a different perspective on his kingship. More specifically, Ricardian historians, the Richard III Society and The Society of Friends of King Richard III have striven to provide historical perspectives more favourable to Richard III and his achievements during his brief reign.

=== Richard II ===
The following passage from Act 4, Scene 1 in Shakespeare's play, Richard II, is often pointed to as an expression of the Tudor myth. It is a speech by the character the Bishop of Carlisle, spoken just as Bolingbroke suggests that he will ascend the throne of England. Carlisle raises his voice to object, and ends with a vision of the future that seems to prophesy the civil wars that are the basis of Shakespeare's English history plays:

My Lord of Hereford here, whom you call king,
Is a foul traitor to proud Hereford's king;
And if you crown him, let me prophesy,
The blood of English shall manure the ground
And future ages groan for this foul act;
Peace shall go sleep with Turks and infidels,
And in this seat of peace tumultuous wars
Shall kin with kin and kind with kind confound;
Disorder, horror, fear, and mutiny,
Shall here inhabit, and this land be call'd
The field of Golgotha and dead men's skulls.
O! if you raise this house against this house,
It will the woefullest division prove
That ever fell upon this cursed earth.
Prevent it, resist it, let it not be so,
Lest child, child's children, cry against you woe!

In this scene, Shakespeare is expressing the conventional Tudor-era view that the chaos of the 15th century was a divine punishment for the deposition of Richard II.

== In other notable works ==
- The Anglica Historia of Polydore Vergil, Books 23–25 on Richard III.; Entire 1555 edition (Henry VII's official historian). First in print in 1534.
- Sir Thomas More's History of King Richard III (1513). More's book is hostile to Richard in a partisan spirit. A few years after Richard died a Warwickshire historian named John Rous claimed that Richard spent two years in the womb, and was finally born with a full set of teeth, and a full head of hair. Thomas More described Richard as "malicious, wrathful, envious … little of stature, ill featured of limbs, crook back." More's source was John Morton, who was Archbishop of Canterbury under Henry VII, and had served as Bishop of Ely under Edward IV and Richard III. Other sources include various Tudor accounts, including those by John Rous and Polydore Vergil. More also provides direct testimony.
- Edward Hall's Union of the Noble and Illustre Families of Lancaster and York (1548), portrayed King Henry IV in a favourable light.
- Raphael Holinshed and his collaborators who wrote the Chronicles of England, Scotland and Wales (2nd edition, 1587), which was Shakespeare's primary source for his history plays.
- William Shakespeare's play, Richard III
- In The Black Adder, Richard III is presented as a kind man and good king who wins the Battle of Bosworth Field, but is succeeded by his nephew as Richard IV after he is accidentally killed. After Richard IV's death at the end of the series, Henry VII becomes king and rewrites history, presenting Richard III as an evil king, and eliminating Richard IV's reign from the history books.

== King John ==
Tudor propaganda also sought to rehabilitate King John as a dissenter from the church.

== See also ==
- Exhumation and reburial of Richard III of England
- Ricardian (Richard III)
