= Ricardian (Richard III) =

Person interested in rehabilitating the reputation of Richard III of England

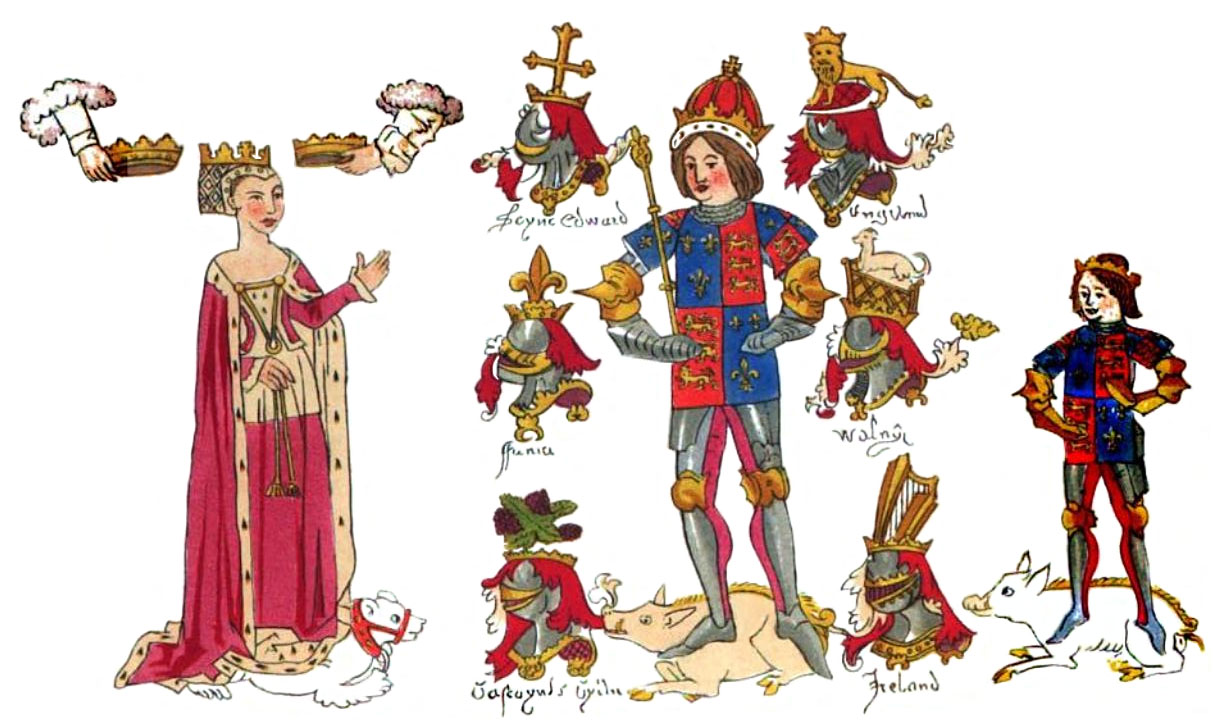
Richard, his wife Anne Neville, and their son Edward of Middleham, Prince of Wales standing on white boars in a contemporary heraldic roll by John Rous.

Ricardians are people who dispute the negative posthumous reputation of King Richard III of England (reigned 1483–1485). Richard III has long been portrayed unfavourably, most notably in Shakespeare's play Richard III, in which he is portrayed as murdering his 12-year-old nephew Edward V to secure the English throne for himself. Ricardians believe these portrayals are false and politically motivated by Tudor propaganda.

== Beliefs ==
Ricardians accept as facts: that first the young king Edward V was placed under the protection of his uncle Richard III; that Richard III himself was then crowned as the new king instead of young Edward V; and finally that the young king disappeared at some point over the coming years, never to be seen again. However, they dispute the initial common assumption by many, that Richard III was personally responsible for the disappearance (or perhaps murder) of Edward V.

Richard III's reign lasted for only two years, and his short reign came to a violent end on 22 August 1485 at the Battle of Bosworth; the last battle of the War of the Roses. In the aftermath of the battle, Richard III's body was not given a proper state funeral, and the location of his remains was soon forgotten; there was even a belief, now proved false, that they had been thrown into the River Soar in Leicester following the Dissolution of the Monasteries. Ricardians assert that many of the original assumptions about Richard III's motives and likely responsibility relating to these events were not supported by the facts of the day, that these assumptions were most probably instead the result of the political claims of his successors, and that they were most probably mistaken assumptions.

The two most notable societies of Ricardians are the Richard III Society, and the Richard III Foundation, Inc. A third much smaller Ricardian organisation, composed of "collateral descendants" of Richard III, was the Plantagenet Alliance. In 2012, the Richard III Society was instrumental in leading an archaeological effort to positively locate and identify the long-lost remains of Richard III, which resulted in the discovery and retrieval of the remains from beneath a Leicester car park. Subsequently, much popular historical interest was generated in this historical period. Such historical interest resulted in the review and publication of many articles and documents regarding Richard's reign, which have contributed to the scholarship of latter 15th-century England. After their discovery, Richard III's remains were first scientifically evaluated, then formally re-interred within the interior of Leicester Cathedral on 26 March 2015. Their re-interment occurred amidst days of solemn ceremonies and pageantry.

=== Notable Ricardians ===
Ricardian historiography includes works by Horace Walpole and by Sir George Buck, who was the king's first defender, after the Tudor period.

Ricardian fiction includes Josephine Tey's The Daughter of Time and Sharon Kay Penman's The Sunne in Splendour. Elizabeth George writes of the fictional discovery of an exonerating document in her short story "I Richard". Science fiction writer Andre Norton, in the 1965 novel Quest Crosstime, depicted an alternate history in which Richard III won at Bosworth and turned out to be one of England's greatest kings, "achieving the brilliance of the Elizabethan era two generations earlier".

Other notable Ricardians include:

- Laurence Olivier, actor
- Tallulah Bankhead, actress
- José Ferrer, actor
- T. S. Eliot, author
- Philippa Gregory, author

== Richard III Society ==
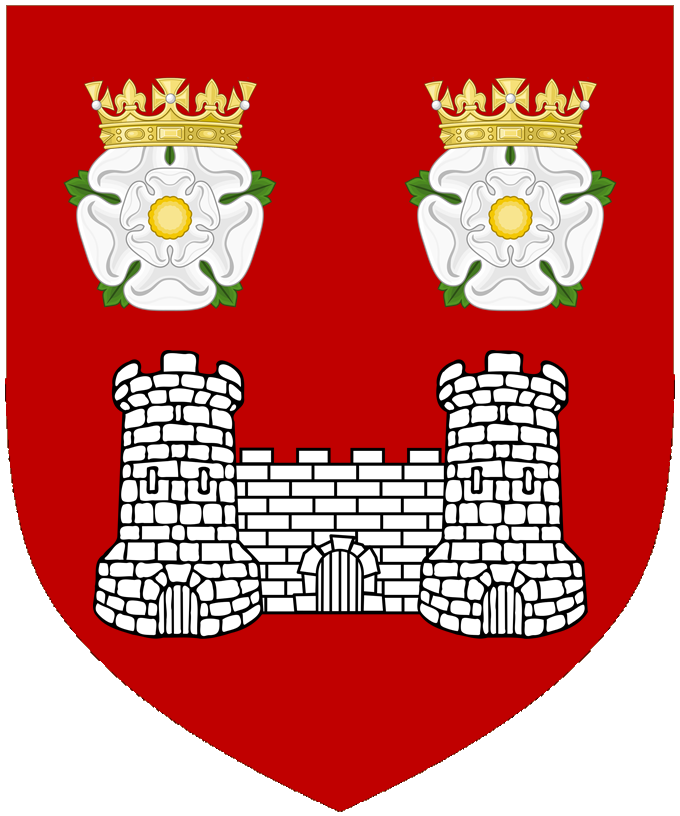
The arms of the society, granted in 1989

The Richard III Society was founded in 1924 by Liverpool surgeon Samuel Saxon Barton (1892-1957) as The Fellowship of the White Boar, Richard's badge and a symbol of the Yorkist army in the Wars of the Roses. Its membership was originally a small group of interested amateur historians whose aim was to bring about a re-assessment of the reputation of Richard III.

The society became moribund during the Second World War. In 1951, Josephine Tey published her detective novel The Daughter of Time, in which Richard's guilt is examined and doubted. In 1955, Laurence Olivier released his film of Shakespeare's Richard III, which at the beginning admitted that the play was based on legend, and a sympathetic, detailed biography of Richard was published by Paul Murray Kendall, all of which went some way towards re-invigorating the society.

The Fellowship of the White Boar was renamed The Richard III Society in 1959.

In 2012, the society, working in partnership with the University of Leicester and Leicester City Council, exhumed a skeleton at the site of the former Greyfriars Church that was later confirmed to be that of the King.

Philippa Langley, the secretary of the Scottish Branch of the Richard III Society, inaugurated the quest for King Richard's lost grave as part of her ongoing research into the controversial monarch. Her project marked the first-ever search for the grave of an anointed King of England. For their role in the exhumation, Langley and John Ashdown-Hill were awarded the MBEs in recognition of their services to "the Exhumation and Identification of Richard III" (London Gazette) in the 2015 Queen's Birthday Honours.

== The Richard III Foundation, Inc. ==
The Foundation is a US educational organization. The aims of the Foundation are to study, share and stimulate interest in the life and times of King Richard III and the Wars of the Roses.

Its website states, "The Foundation seeks to challenge the popular view of King Richard III by demonstrating through rigorous scholarship that the facts of Richard’s life and reign are in stark contrast to the Shakespearian caricature."

Their aim is to identify and translate documents and texts that shed new insight into this important period of history.

== Plantagenet Alliance ==
The Plantagenet Alliance was a grouping of 15 individuals who claimed to be "collateral [non-direct] descendants" of Richard III, and have been described as a "Ricardian fan club". The group, formed for the purpose, unsuccessfully campaigned during 2013 and 2014 to have Richard re-interred at York Minster rather than Leicester Cathedral, believing that that was his wish. During the campaign, the group failed to attract enough support to petition Parliament.
