= Exhumation and reburial of Richard III of England =

2012 archaeological event

Coordinates: 52°38′2.6″N 1°8′10.6″W

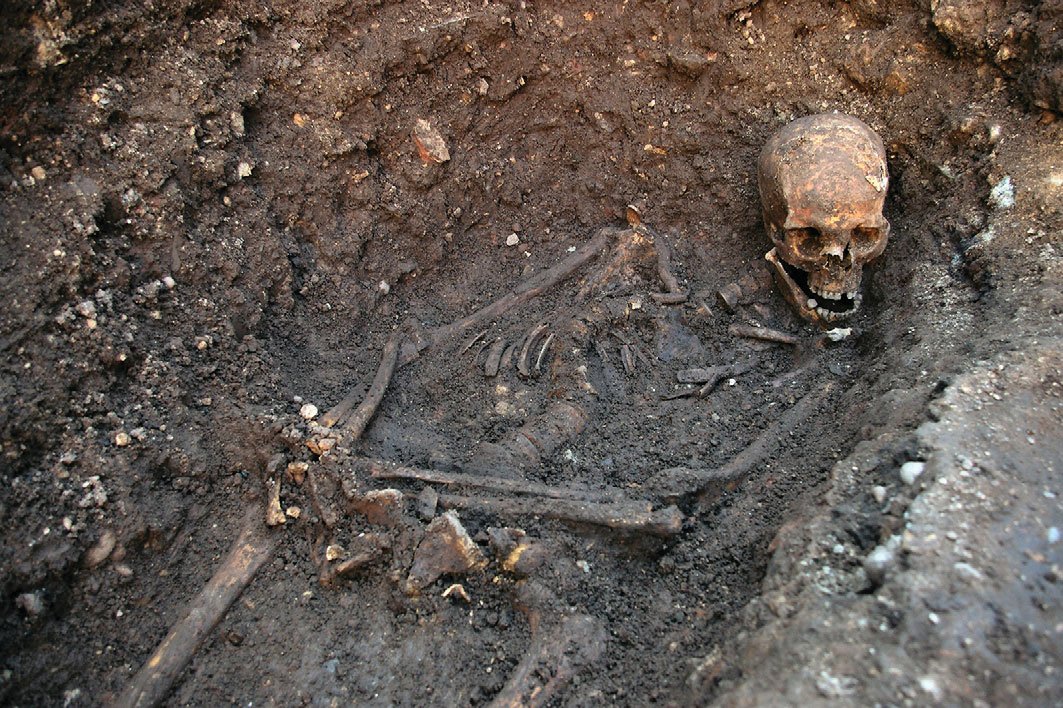
The remains of King Richard III as discovered in situ at the site of Grey Friars Priory, Leicester, pictured in 2012

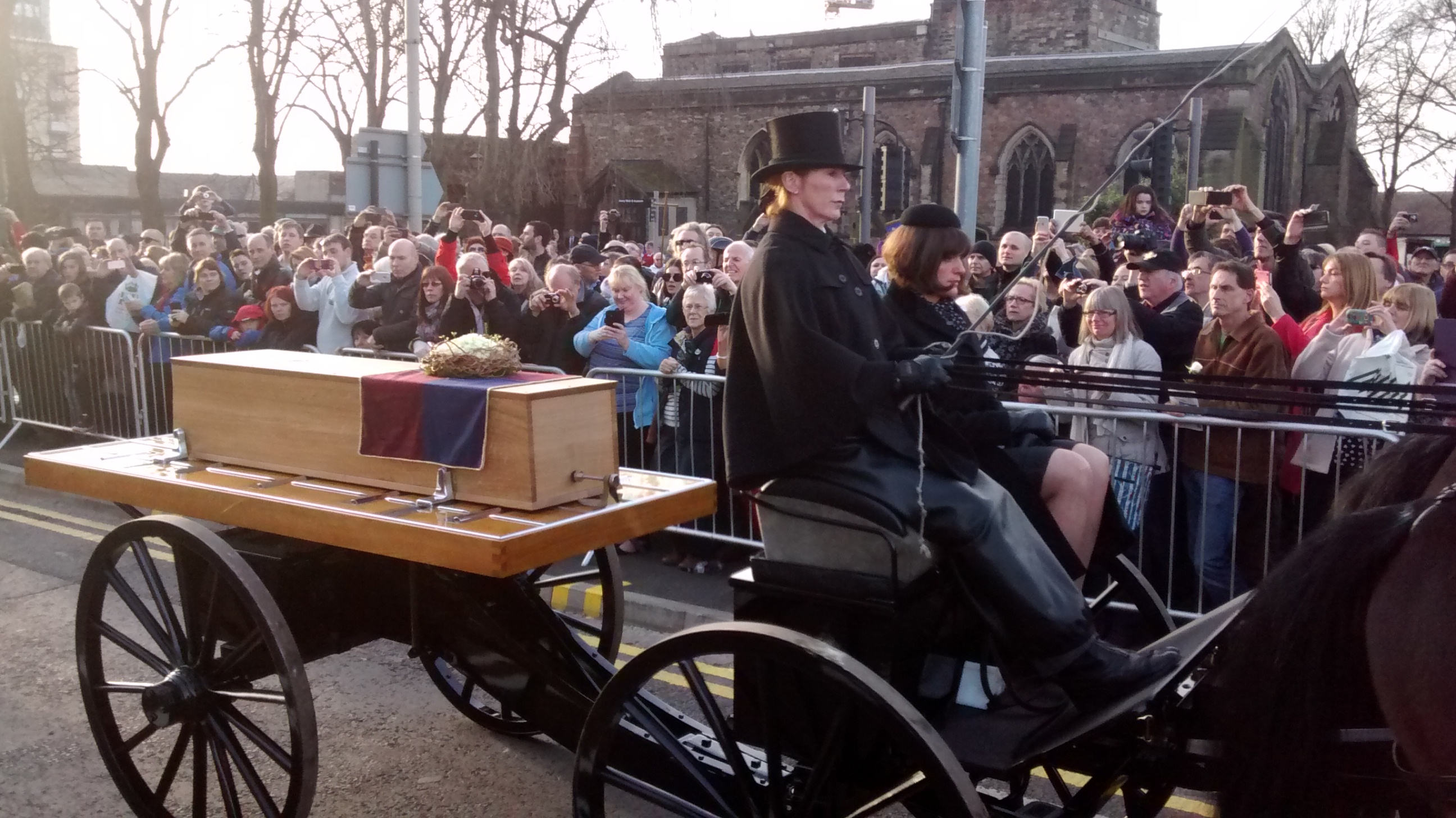
Funeral cortège bearing Richard's modern coffin

On 25 August 2012, in Leicester, England, the remains of Richard III, the last English king killed in battle and last king of the House of York, were discovered within the site of the former Greyfriars Friary. Following extensive anthropological and genetic testing, the remains were reinterred at Leicester Cathedral on 26 March 2015.

Richard III, the final ruler of the Plantagenet dynasty, was killed on 22 August 1485 in the Battle of Bosworth Field, the last significant battle of the Wars of the Roses. His body was taken to Greyfriars, where it was buried in a crude grave in the friary church. Following the friary's dissolution in 1538 and subsequent demolition, Richard's tomb was lost. An erroneous account arose that Richard's bones had been thrown into the River Soar at the nearby Bow Bridge.

A search for Richard's body began in August 2012, initiated by Philippa Langley and the Looking for Richard project with the support of the Richard III Society. The archaeological excavation was led by University of Leicester Archaeological Services, working in partnership with Leicester City Council. On the first day, a human skeleton belonging to a man in his thirties was uncovered showing signs of severe injuries. The skeleton, which had several unusual physical features, most notably scoliosis, a severe curvature of the spine, was exhumed to allow scientific analysis. Examination showed that the man had probably been killed either by a blow from a large bladed weapon, probably a halberd, which cut off the back of his skull and exposed the brain, or by a sword thrust that penetrated all the way through the brain. Other wounds on the skeleton had probably occurred after death as "humiliation injuries", inflicted as a form of posthumous revenge.

The age of the bones at death matched that of Richard when he was killed; they were dated to about the period of his death and were mostly consistent with physical descriptions of the king. Preliminary DNA analysis showed that mitochondrial DNA extracted from the bones matched that of two matrilineal descendants, one 17th-generation and the other 19th-generation, of Richard's sister Anne of York. Taking these findings into account along with other historical, scientific and archaeological evidence, the University of Leicester announced on 4 February 2013 that it had concluded beyond reasonable doubt that the skeleton was that of Richard III.

As a condition of being allowed to disinter the skeleton, the archaeologists agreed that, if Richard were found, his remains would be reburied in Leicester Cathedral. A controversy arose as to whether an alternative reburial site, York Minster or Westminster Abbey, would be more suitable. A legal challenge confirmed there were no public law grounds for the courts to be involved in that decision. Reinterment took place in Leicester on 26 March 2015, during a televised memorial service held in the presence of the Archbishop of Canterbury and senior members of other Christian denominations.

== Death and initial burial ==
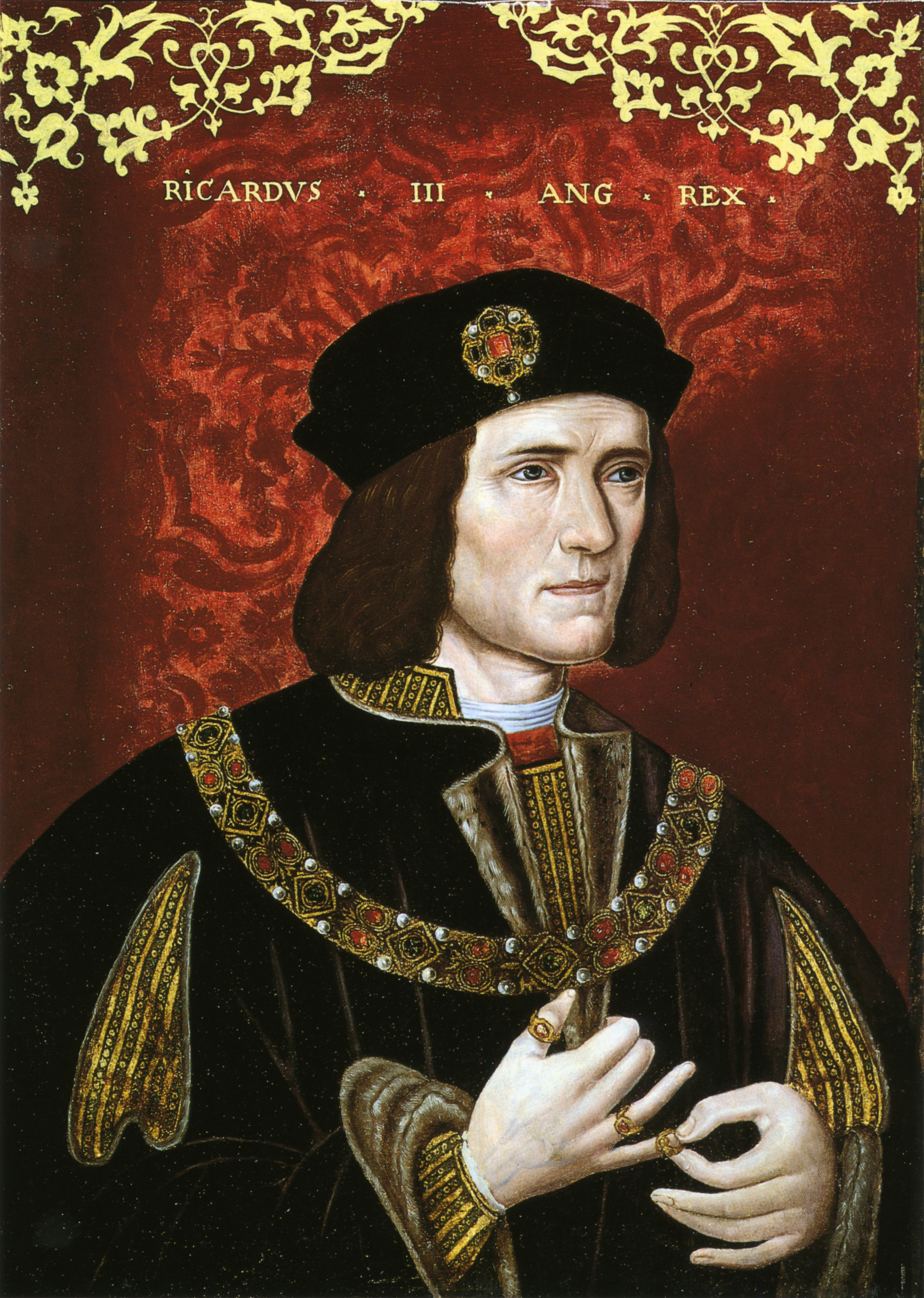
Richard III, by an unknown artist, late 16th century. The raised right shoulder was a visible sign of Richard's spinal deformity.

King Richard III of England was killed fighting the forces of Henry Tudor at the Battle of Bosworth in 1485, the last major battle of the Wars of the Roses. It has previously been suggested that the poet Guto'r Glyn credits Rhys ap Thomas personally with the killing blow based on line 38 of his only surviving panegyric to the nobleman: Lladd y baedd, eilliodd ei ben 'killing the boar, he shaved his head'. Richard's emblem was a white boar, but Dafydd Johnston notes that the grammatical subject of the phrase in this poem is y Cing Harri 'King Henry' in line 35. The reference to the shaving likely refers instead to a post mortem ritual shaving of Richard's head, to be compared with the shaving of a boar's head before cooking. Nevertheless, the poet does appear to suggest Richard was killed by a group of soldiers led by Rhys. Richard III was the last English king to be killed in battle.

Richard's body was stripped naked and taken to Leicester where it was put on public display. The anonymous Ballad of Bosworth Field says that "in Newarke laid was hee, that many a one might looke on him"—almost certainly a reference to the collegiate Church of the Annunciation of Our Lady of the Newarke, a Lancastrian foundation on the outskirts of medieval Leicester. According to the chronicler Polydore Vergil, Henry VII "tarried for two days" in Leicester before leaving for London, and on the same date as Henry's departure—25 August 1485—Richard's body was buried "at the convent of Franciscan monks [sic] in Leicester" with "no funeral solemnity". The Warwickshire priest and antiquary John Rous, writing between 1486 and 1491, recorded that Richard had been buried "in the choir of the Friars Minor at Leicester". Although later writers ascribed Richard's burial to other places, the accounts of Vergil and Rous were seen by modern investigators as the most credible.

=== Burial site ===
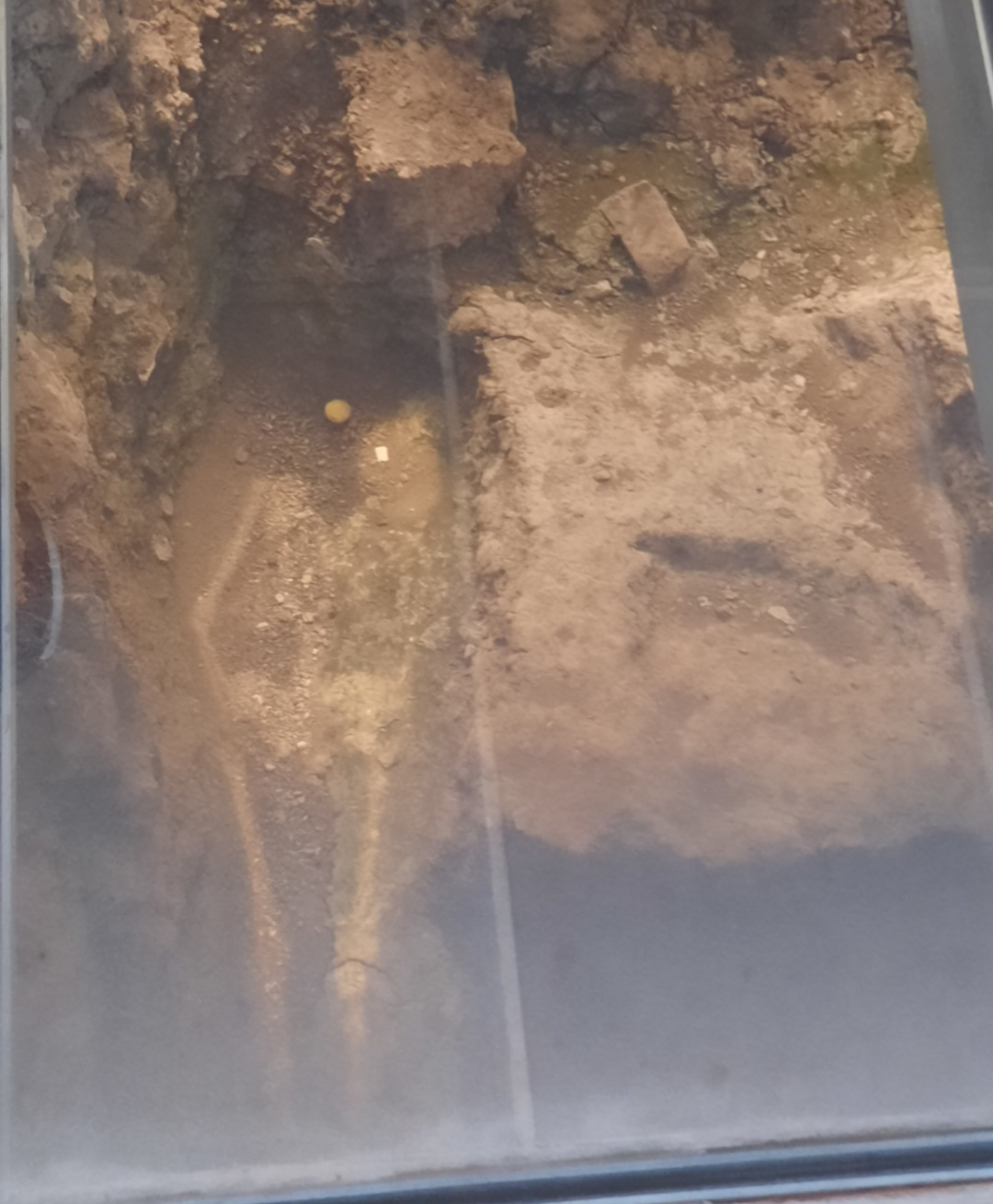
The grave of Richard III from 1485; an illuminated silhouette of his skeleton shows where his body lay within the grave.

In 1495, ten years after the burial, Henry VII paid for a marble and alabaster monument to mark Richard's grave. Its cost is recorded in surviving legal papers relating to a dispute over payment showing that two men received payments of £50 and £10/1s, respectively, to make and transport the tomb from Nottingham to Leicester. No first-person descriptions of the tomb survive, but Raphael Holinshed wrote in 1577 (perhaps quoting someone who had seen it in person) that it incorporated "a picture of alabaster representing [Richard's] person". Forty years later, George Buck wrote that it was "a fair tomb of mingled colour marble adorned with his image". Buck also recorded the epitaph inscribed on the tomb.

Following the dissolution of the monasteries in 1538, Greyfriars was demolished and the monument was either destroyed or slowly decayed as a result of being exposed to the elements. The site of the friary was sold to two Lincolnshire property speculators and was later acquired by Robert Herrick, the mayor of Leicester (and eventual uncle of the poet Robert Herrick). Mayor Herrick built a mansion close to Friary Lane, on a site now buried under the modern Grey Friars Street, and turned the rest of the land into gardens. Although Richard's monument had evidently disappeared by this time, the site of his grave was still known. The antiquary Christopher Wren (father of Christopher Wren the architect) recorded that Herrick erected a monument on the site of the grave in the form of a stone pillar three feet (1 m) high carved with the words, "Here lies the Body of Richard III, Some Time King of England." The pillar was visible in 1612 but had disappeared by 1844.

Despite the pillar marking the grave, the cartographer and antiquarian John Speed fabricated a story in his Historie of Great Britaine (1611) that local tradition held that Richard's body had been "borne out of the City, and contemptuously bestowed under the end of Bow-Bridge, which giveth passage over a branch of Soare upon the west side of the town." His account was widely accepted by later authors. In 1856 a memorial plaque to Richard III was erected next to Bow Bridge by a local builder, stating, "Near this spot lie the remains of Richard III the last of the Plantagenets 1485". The discovery of a skeleton in 1862 in the river sediments near the bridge led to claims that Richard's bones had been found, but closer examination showed they were probably those of a man in his early 20s and not Richard's.

Speed's misrepresentation of the truth was not attributed to any source, nor did it have any antecedents in other written accounts. The writer Audrey Strange forgives Speed's ignorance by suggesting that his account could merely be a confused retelling of desecration of the remains of John Wycliffe in nearby Lutterworth in 1428, when a mob disinterred him, burned his bones and threw them into the River Swift. The independent British historian John Ashdown-Hill proposes that Speed fabricated the story, and had never been to Herrick's property, where he would surely have seen the commemorative pillar and gardens, but instead Speed reported that the site was "overgrown with nettles and weeds" and there was no trace of Richard's grave. The map of Leicester drawn by Speed incorrectly shows Greyfriars where the former Blackfriars was, suggesting that he had looked for the grave in the wrong place and created the story of the skeleton having been thrown in the river.

Another local legend arose about a stone coffin that supposedly held Richard's remains, which Speed wrote was "now made a drinking trough for horses at a common Inn". A coffin certainly seems to have existed; John Evelyn recorded it on a visit in 1654, and Celia Fiennes wrote in 1700 that she had seen "a piece of his tombstone [sic] he lay in, which was cut out in exact form for his body to lie in; it remains to be seen at ye Greyhound [Inn] in Leicester but is partly broken." William Hutton found in 1758 that the coffin, which had "not withstood the ravages of time", was kept at the White Horse Inn on Gallowtree Gate. Although the coffin's location is no longer known, its description does not match the style of late 15th-century coffins, and it is unlikely to have had any connection with Richard. It is more likely that it was salvaged from one of the religious establishments demolished following the Dissolution.

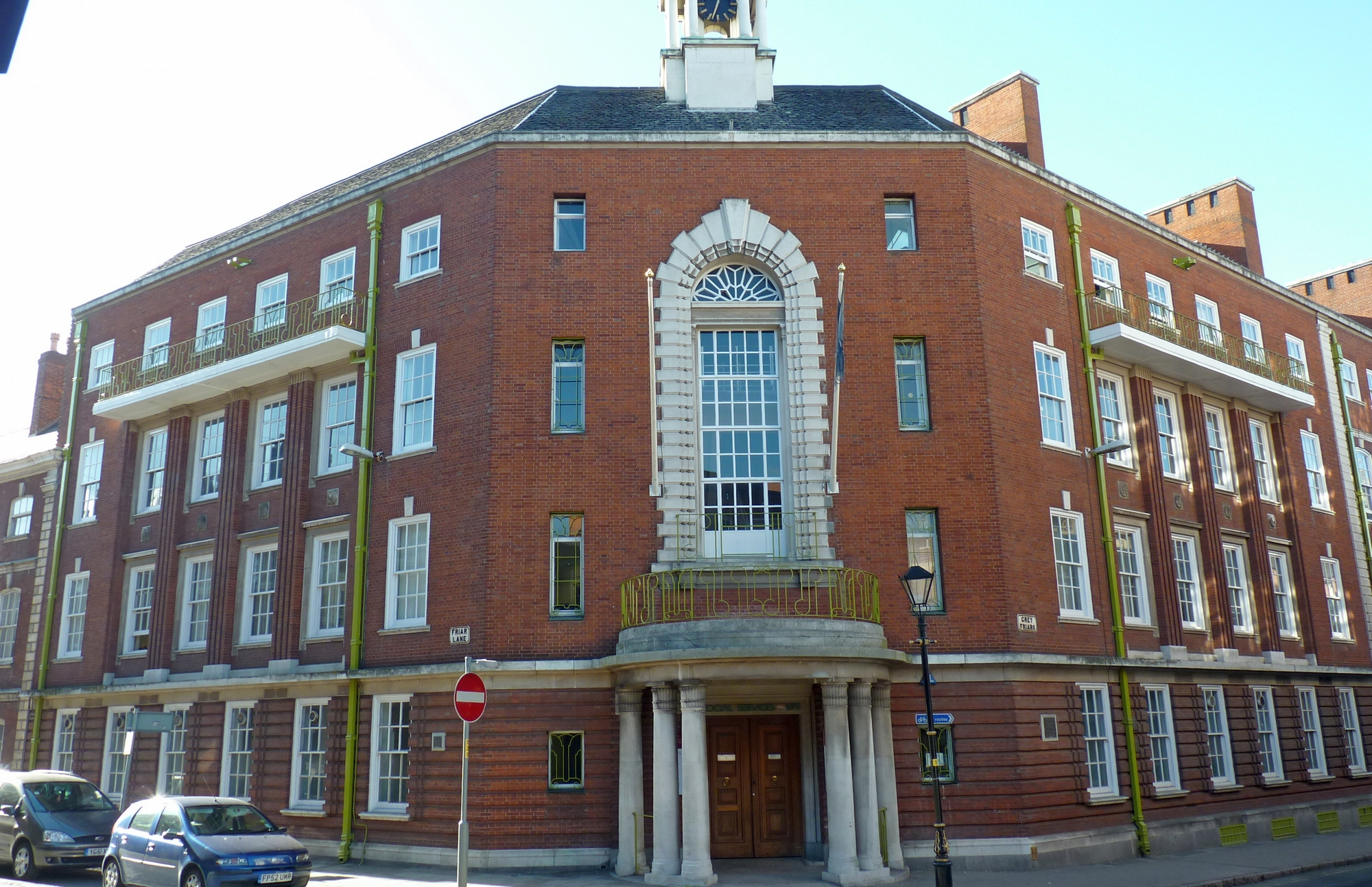
No 1, Grey Friars, County Offices for Leicestershire County Council from 1936 to 1965, occupies the site of the Herrick mansion.

Herrick's mansion, Greyfriars House, remained in the possession of his family until his great-grandson Samuel sold it in 1711. The property was subsequently divided and sold in 1740; three years later, New Street was built across the western part of the site. Many burials were discovered when houses were laid out along the street. A townhouse, 17 Friar Lane, was built on the eastern part of the site in 1759 and survives today. During the 19th century, the site was increasingly built on. In 1863 Alderman Newton's Boys' School built a schoolhouse on part of the site. Herrick's mansion was demolished in 1871, the present Grey Friars Street was laid through the site in 1873, and more commercial developments, including the Leicester Trustee Savings Bank, were built. In 1915 the rest of the site was acquired by Leicestershire County Council which built offices on it in the 1920s and 1930s. The county council relocated in 1965 when its new County Hall opened, and Leicester City Council moved in. The rest of the site, where Herrick's garden had once been, was turned into a staff car park in about 1944, but was not otherwise built on.

In 2007, a single-storey building from the 1950s was demolished on Grey Friars Street, giving archaeologists the opportunity to excavate and search for traces of the medieval friary. Very little was unearthed, except for a fragment of a post-medieval stone coffin lid. The results of the dig suggested that the remains of the friary church were farther west than previously thought.

== Looking for Richard project ==
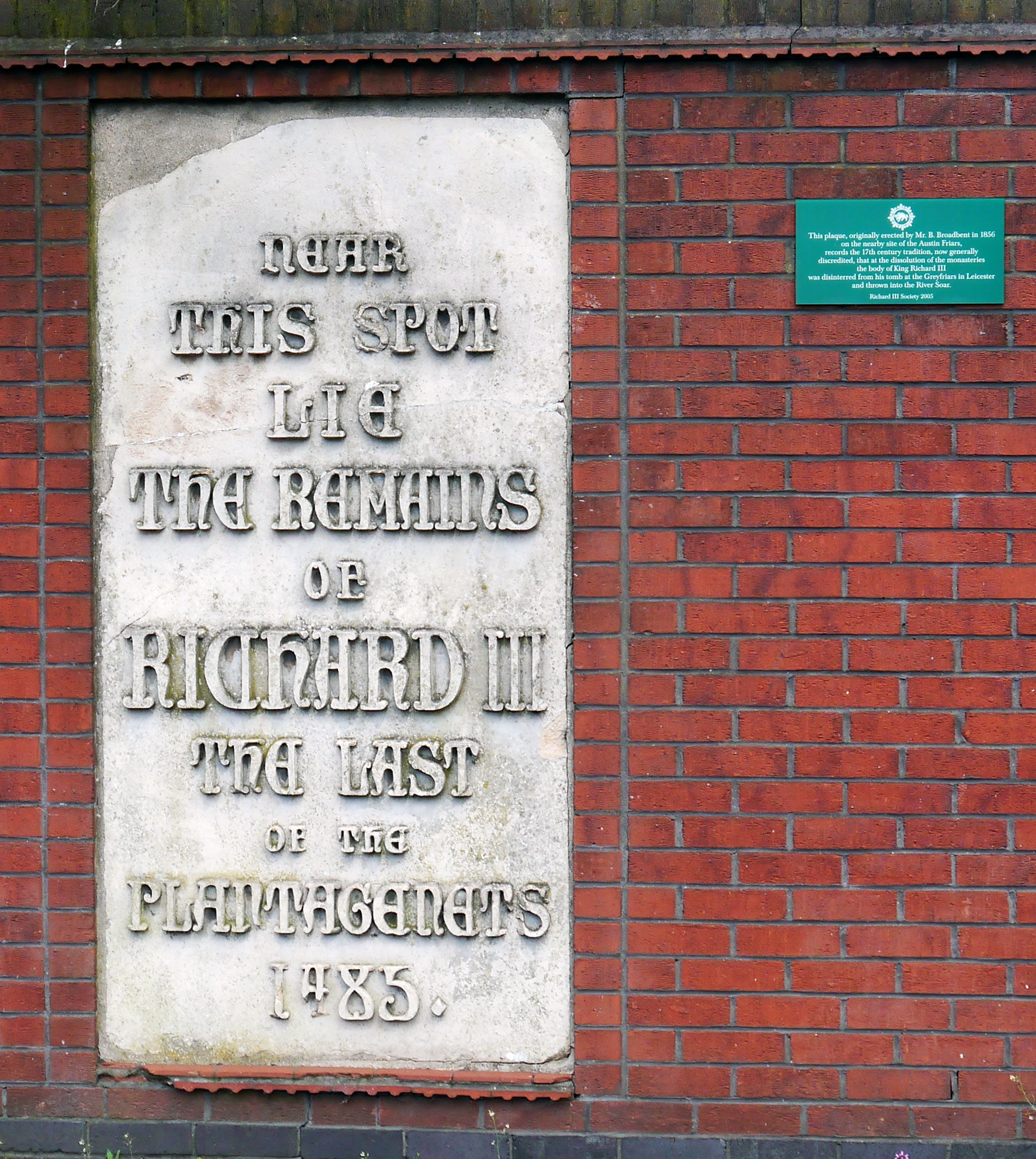
Plaques on Bow Bridge, Leicester, relating to the story that Richard's bones had been dumped into the River Soar. The small plaque was installed by the Richard III Society in 2005 to dispute the statement on the larger plaque, installed in 1856. The body was found buried in the city in 2012.

The location of Richard III's body had long been of interest to the members of the Richard III Society, a group established to bring about a reappraisal of the King's tarnished reputation. In 1975 an article by Audrey Strange was published in the society's journal, The Ricardian, suggesting that his remains were buried under Leicester City Council's car park. The claim was repeated in 1986, when historian David Baldwin suggested that the remains were still in the Greyfriars area. He speculated, "It is possible (though now perhaps unlikely) that at some time in the twenty-first century an excavator may yet reveal the slight remains of this famous monarch."

Although the Richard III Society remained interested in discussing the possible location of the king's grave, they did not search for his remains. Individual members suggested possible lines of investigation, but neither the University of Leicester nor local historians and archaeologists took up the challenge, probably because it was widely thought that the grave site had been built over or the skeleton had been scattered, as John Speed's account suggested.

In 2004 and 2005, Philippa Langley, secretary of the Scottish Branch of the Richard III Society, carried out research in Leicester in connection with a biographical Richard III screenplay and became convinced that the car park was the key location for investigation. In 2005, John Ashdown-Hill announced that he had discovered the mitochondrial DNA sequence of Richard III after identifying two matrilineal descendants of Richard III's sister Anne of York. He also concluded, from his knowledge of the layout of Franciscan priories, that the ruins of the priory church at Greyfriars were likely to lie under the car park and had not been built over. After hearing of his research, Langley urged Ashdown-Hill to contact the producers of Channel 4's Time Team archaeology series to propose an excavation of the car park, but they declined as the dig would take longer than the standard three-day window for Time Team projects.

Three years later, writer Annette Carson published her independent conclusion that his body probably lay under the car park. She joined forces with Langley and Ashdown-Hill to carry out further research. By this point Langley had found what she called a "smoking gun"—a medieval map of Leicester showing the Greyfriars Church at the north end of what was now the car park.

In February 2009, Langley, Carson, and Ashdown-Hill teamed up with Richard III Society members David Johnson and his wife Wendy to launch a project with the working title Looking for Richard: In Search of a King. Its premise was a search for Richard's grave "while at the same time telling his real story", with an objective "to search for, recover and rebury his mortal remains with the honour, dignity and respect so conspicuously denied following his death at the battle of Bosworth." To ensure support from decision makers in Leicester, Langley had secured interest from Darlow Smithson Productions for a televised documentary, which Langley envisaged as a "landmark TV special".

The project gained the backing of several key partners—Leicester City Council, Leicester Promotions (responsible for tourist marketing), the University of Leicester, Leicester Cathedral, Darlow Smithson Productions (responsible for the planned TV show) and the Richard III Society. Funding for the initial phase of pre-excavation research came from the Richard III Society's bursary fund and members of the Looking for Richard project, with Leicester Promotions agreeing to pick up the £35,000 cost of the dig. The University of Leicester Archaeological Services—an independent body with offices at the university—was appointed as the project's archaeological contractor.

== Greyfriars project and excavations ==
Site of Greyfriars, Leicester, shown superimposed over a modern map of the area. The skeleton of Richard III was recovered in September 2012 from the centre of the choir, shown by a small blue dot.

In March 2011, an assessment of the Greyfriars site began to identify where the monastery had stood, and which land might be available for excavation. A desk-based assessment (Note: A desk-based assessment involves gathering together the written, graphic, photographic and electronic information that already exists about a site to help identify the likely character, extent, and quality of the known or suspected remains or structures being researched.) was conducted to determine the archaeological viability of the site, followed by a survey in August 2011 using ground-penetrating radar (GPR). The GPR results were inconclusive; no clear building remains could be identified owing to a layer of disturbed ground and demolition debris just below the surface. The survey was useful in finding modern utilities crossing the site, such as pipes and cables.

Three possible excavation sites were identified: the staff car park of Leicester City Council Social Services, the disused playground of the former Alderman Newton's School and a public car park on New Street. It was decided to open two trenches in the Social Services car park, with an option for a third in the playground. Because most of the Greyfriars site had been built on, only 17% of its former area was available to excavate; the area to be investigated amounted to just 1% of the site, owing to the limitations of the project's funding.

The proposed excavation was announced in the June 2012 issue of the Richard III Society's magazine, the Ricardian Bulletin, but a month later one of the main sponsors pulled out, leaving a £10,000 funding shortfall; an appeal resulted in members of the several Ricardian groups donating £13,000 in two weeks. A press conference held in Leicester on 24 August announced the start of the work. Archaeologist Richard Buckley admitted the project was a long shot: "We don't know precisely where the church is, let alone where the burial site is." He had earlier told Langley that he thought the odds were "fifty-fifty at best for [finding] the church, and nine-to-one against finding the grave."

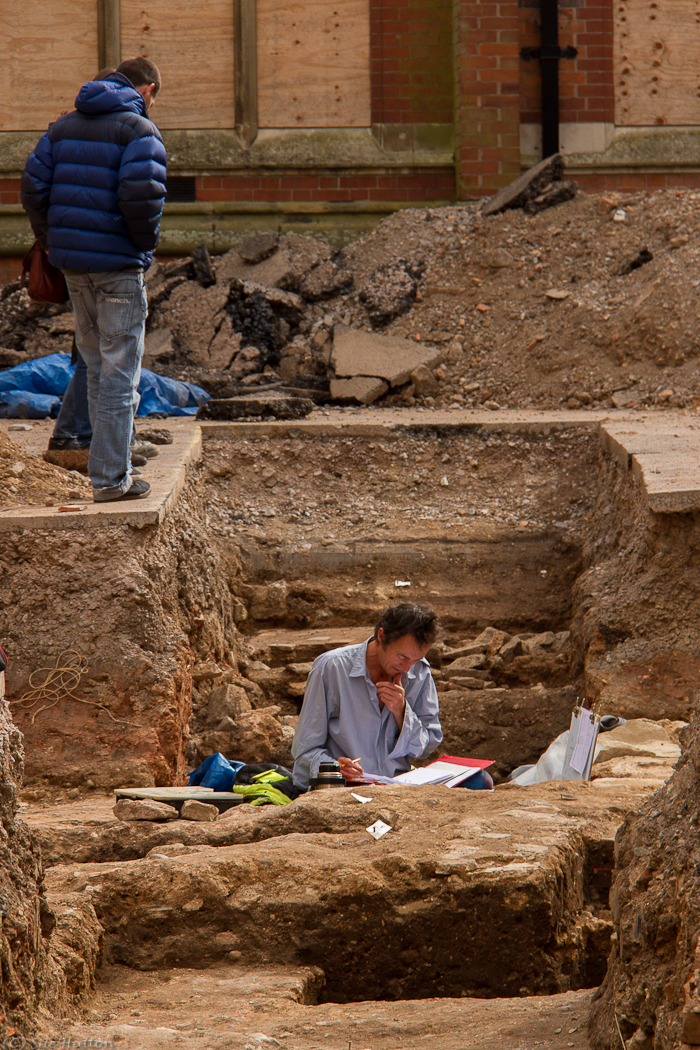
Archaeologists working in a trench in the playground of the former Alderman Newton's School, on the site of the Greyfriars Church, in September 2012

Digging began the next day with a trench 1.6 metres (5.2 ft) wide by 30 metres (98 ft) long, running roughly north-south. A layer of modern building debris was removed before the level of the former monastery was reached. Two parallel human leg bones were discovered about 5 metres (16 ft) from the north end of the trench at a depth of about 1.5 metres (4.9 ft), indicating an undisturbed burial. The bones were covered temporarily to protect them while excavations continued further along the trench. A second, parallel trench was dug next day to the south-west. Over the following days, evidence of medieval walls and rooms was uncovered, allowing the archaeologists to pinpoint the area of the friary. It became clear that the bones found on the first day lay inside the east part of the church, possibly the choir, where Richard was said to have been buried. On 31 August, the University of Leicester Archaeological Services applied for a licence from the Ministry of Justice to permit the exhumation of up to six sets of human remains. To narrow the search, it was planned that only the remains of men in their thirties, buried within the church, would be exhumed.

The bones found on 25 August were uncovered on 4 September and the grave soil dug back further over the next two days. The feet were missing, and the skull was found in an unusual propped-up position, consistent with the body being put into a grave that was slightly too small. The spine was curved in an S-shape. No sign of a coffin was found; the skeleton's posture suggested the body had not been put in a shroud, but had been hurriedly dumped into the grave and buried. As the bones were lifted from the ground, a piece of rusted iron was found underneath the vertebrae. The skeleton's hands were in an unusual position, crossed over the right hip, suggesting they were tied together at the time of burial, although this could not be established definitively. After the exhumation, work continued in the trenches over the following week, before the site was covered with soil to protect it from damage and re-surfaced to restore the car park and playground to their former condition.

== Analysis of the discovery ==
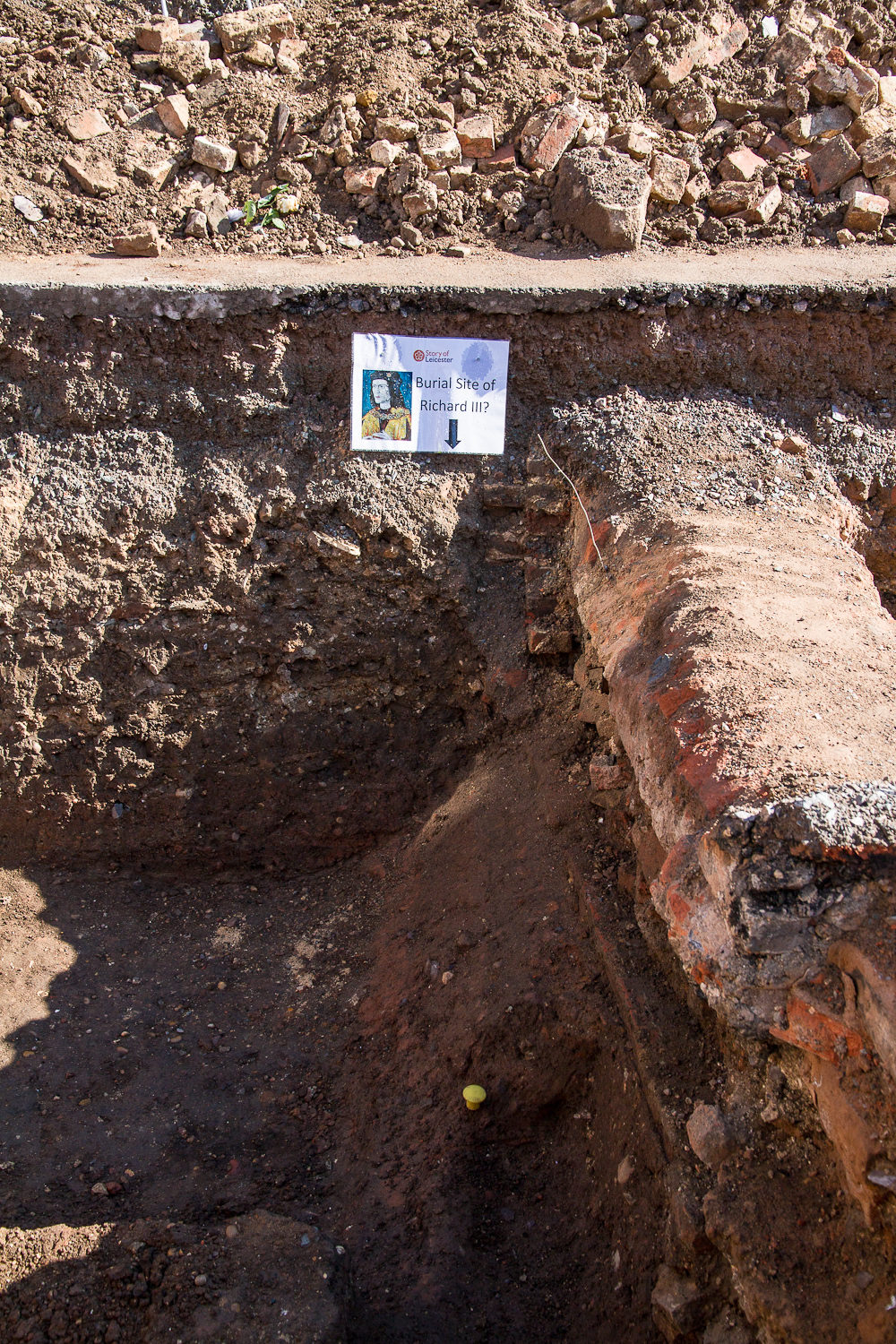
The site of Richard III's grave, against a wall in the choir of the former Greyfriars Church

On 12 September 2012, the University of Leicester team announced that the human remains were a possible candidate for Richard's body, but emphasised the need for caution. The positive indicators were that the body was of an adult male; it was buried beneath the choir of the church; it had severe scoliosis of the spine, possibly making one shoulder higher than the other. An object that appeared to be an arrowhead was found under the spine and the skull had severe injuries.

=== DNA evidence ===
After the exhumation the emphasis shifted from the excavation to laboratory analysis of the bones. Ashdown-Hill had used genealogical research to track down matrilineal descendants of Anne of York, Richard's older sister, whose matrilineal line of descent is extant through her daughter Anne St Leger. Academic Kevin Schürer subsequently traced a second individual in the same line.

Ashdown-Hill's research came about as a result of a challenge in 2003 to provide a DNA sequence for Richard's sister Margaret, to identify bones found in her burial place, the Franciscan priory church in Mechelen, Belgium. He tried to extract a mitochondrial DNA sequence from a preserved hair from Edward IV held by the Ashmolean Museum in Oxford, but the attempt proved unsuccessful, owing to degradation of the DNA. Ashdown-Hill turned instead to genealogical research to identify an all-female-line descendant of Cecily Neville, Richard's mother. After two years, he found that a British-born woman who had emigrated to Canada after World War II, Joy Ibsen (née Brown), was a direct descendant of Richard's sister, Anne of York, and therefore Richard's 16th generation great-niece. Ibsen's mitochondrial DNA was tested and found to belong to mitochondrial DNA Haplogroup J, which by deduction should be Richard's mitochondrial DNA haplogroup. The mtDNA obtained from Ibsen showed that the Mechelen bones were not those of Margaret.

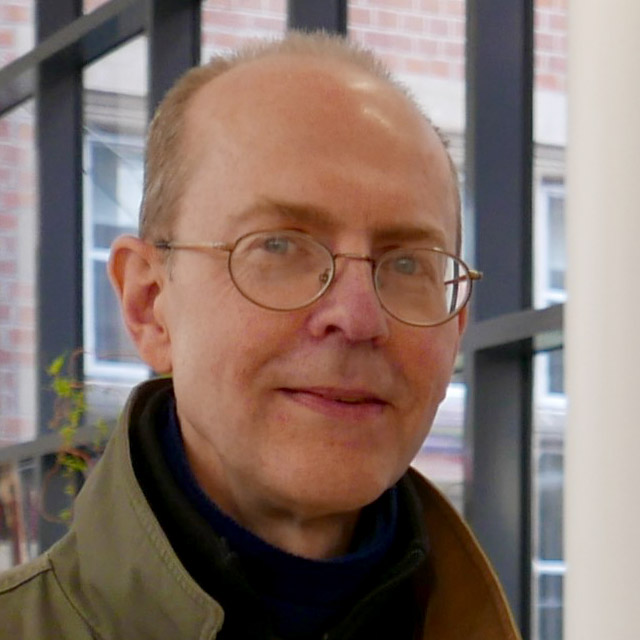
Michael Ibsen, Richard III's nephew 16 times removed

Joy Ibsen, a retired journalist, died in 2008, leaving three children: Michael, Jeff, and Leslie. On 24 August 2012, her son Michael (born in Canada in 1957, a cabinet maker residing in London, England) gave a mouth-swab sample to the research team to compare with samples from the human remains found at the excavation. Analysts found a mitochondrial DNA match among the exhumed skeleton, Michael Ibsen, and a second direct maternal line descendant, who shares a relatively rare mitochondrial DNA sequence, haplogroup J1c2c.

One other living female-line relative of Richard III is Wendy Duldig, an Australian resident in England and a 19th generation descendant of Anne of York. Duldig, who has no surviving children, is connected to the Ibsen family through Anne's granddaughter Catherine Constable (née Manners). Descendants of Constable, including one of Duldig's ancestors, reportedly emigrated to New Zealand. Duldig's mitochondrial DNA is reportedly a close match, i.e., it features one mutation.

Despite the matching mitochondrial DNA, geneticist Turi King continued to pursue a link between the paternally-inherited Y DNA and that of descendants of John of Gaunt. Four living male-line descendants of Gaunt have been located, and their results are a match to each other. The Y DNA from the skeleton is somewhat degraded, but proved not to match any of the living male-line relatives, suggesting that a false-paternity event had happened somewhere in the 19 generations between Richard III and Henry Somerset, 5th Duke of Beaufort; work by Turi King and others has shown that historical rates of false paternity are around 1–2% per generation.

Michael Hicks, a Wars of the Roses historian, was particularly critical of the use of the mitochondrial DNA to argue that the body is Richard III's, stating that "any male sharing a maternal ancestress in the direct female line could qualify". He also criticises the rejection by the Leicester team of the Y chromosomal evidence, suggesting that it was not acceptable to the Leicester team to conclude that the skeleton was anyone other than Richard III. He argues that on the basis of the present scientific evidence "identification with Richard III is more unlikely than likely". However, Hicks draws attention to the contemporary view held by some that Richard III's grandfather, Richard, Earl of Cambridge, was the product of an illegitimate union between Cambridge's mother Isabella of Castile and John Holland (brother in law of Henry IV of England), rather than Edmund of Langley, 1st Duke of York (Edward III's fourth son). If that was the case, then the Y chromosome discrepancy with the Beaufort line would be explained but obviously still fail to prove the identity of the body. Hicks suggests alternative candidates descended from Richard III's maternal ancestress for the body (e.g. Thomas Percy, 1st Baron Egremont, and John de la Pole, 1st Earl of Lincoln) but does not provide evidence to support his suggestions.

Langley rebuts Hicks's argument on the grounds that he does not take into account all the circumstantial evidence. The University of Leicester also responded to Hicks's criticism:

The identification was made by combining different lines of evidence. These include the fact that the location of the grave matches the information provided by John Rous, and that the nature of the skeleton – the age of the man, his build, injuries and scoliosis – is in agreement with historical accounts... The strength of the identification is that different kinds of evidence all point to the same result.

=== Bones ===
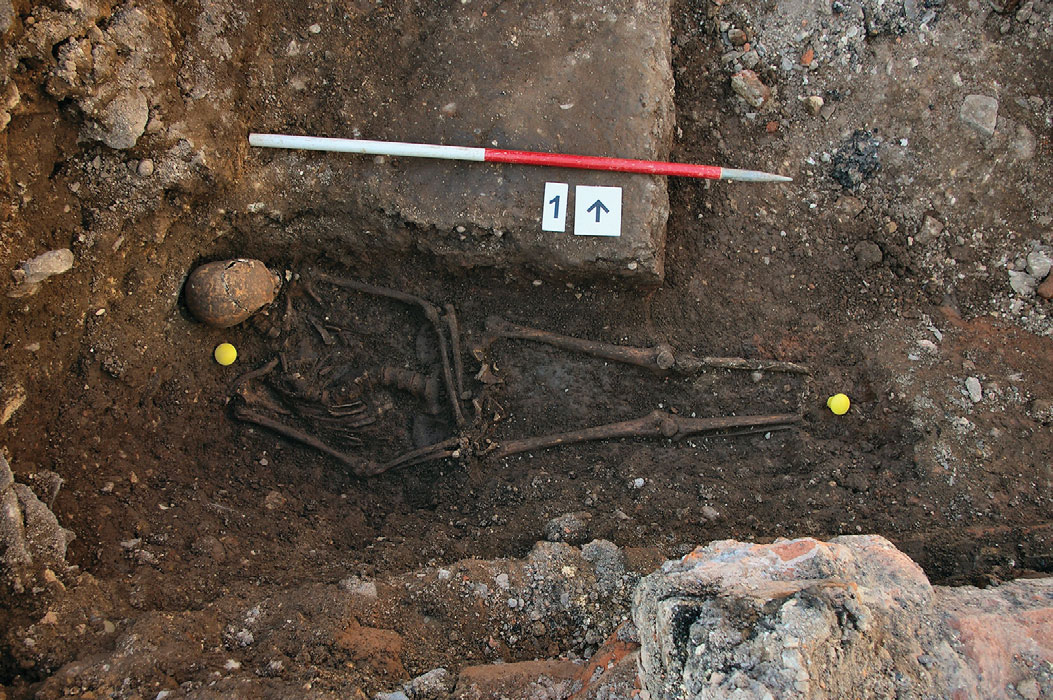
Richard III's bones as originally discovered

An osteological examination of the bones showed them to be in generally good condition and largely complete except for the missing feet, which may have been destroyed by Victorian building work. It was immediately apparent that the body had suffered major injuries, and further evidence of wounds was found as the skeleton was cleaned. The skull shows signs of two lethal injuries; the base of the back of the skull had been completely cut away by a bladed weapon, which would have exposed the brain, and another bladed weapon had been thrust through the right side of the skull, striking the inside of the left side through the brain. Elsewhere on the skull, a blow from a pointed weapon had penetrated the crown of the head. Bladed weapons had clipped the skull and sheared off layers of bone, without penetrating it. Other holes in the skull and lower jaw were found to be consistent with dagger wounds to the chin and cheek. The multiple wounds on the skull indicated that the man was not wearing his helmet at the time, which he may have either removed or lost when he was on foot after his horse had become stuck in the marsh. One of his right ribs had been cut by a sharp implement, as had the pelvis. There was no evidence of the withered arm that afflicted the character in William Shakespeare's play Richard III.

Taken together, the injuries appear to be a combination of battle wounds, which were the cause of death, followed by post-mortem humiliation wounds inflicted on the corpse. The body wounds show that the corpse had been stripped of its armour, as the stabbed torso would have been protected by a backplate and the pelvis would have been protected by armour. The wounds were made from behind on the back and buttocks while they were exposed to the elements, consistent with the contemporary descriptions of Richard's naked body being tied across a horse with the legs and arms dangling down on either side. There may have been further flesh wounds not apparent from the bones.

The head wounds are consistent with the narrative of a 1485 poem by Guto'r Glyn in which a Welsh knight, Rhys ap Thomas, killed Richard and "shaved the boar's head". It had been thought that this was a figurative description of Richard being decapitated, but the skeleton's head had clearly not been severed. Guto's description may instead be a literal account of the injuries that Richard suffered, as the blows sustained to the head would have sliced away much of his scalp and hair, along with slivers of bone. Other contemporary sources refer explicitly to head injuries and the weapons used to kill Richard; the French chronicler Jean Molinet wrote that "one of the Welshmen then came after him, and struck him dead with a halberd", and the Ballad of Lady Bessie recorded that "they struck his bascinet to his head until his brains came out with blood". Such accounts would certainly fit the damage inflicted on the skull.

Sideways curvature of the spine was evident as the skeleton was excavated. It has been attributed to adolescent-onset scoliosis. Although it was probably visible in making his right shoulder higher than the left and reducing his apparent height, it did not preclude an active lifestyle, and would not have caused what modern medicine describes as a "hunchback". The bones are those of a male with an age range estimation of 30–34, consistent with Richard, who was 32 when he died.

=== Radiocarbon dating and other scientific analyses ===
Two radiocarbon datings to find the age of the bones suggested dates of 1430–1460 (Note: Scottish Universities Environmental Research Centre (SUERC)) and 1412–1449 (Note: University of Oxford's Radiocarbon Accelerator Unit)—both too early for Richard's death in 1485. Mass spectrometry carried out on the bones found evidence of much seafood consumption, which is known to make radiocarbon dating samples appear older than they are. A Bayesian analysis suggested there was a 68.2% probability that the true date of the bones was between 1475 and 1530, rising to 95.4% for 1450–1540. Although by itself not enough to prove that the skeleton was Richard's, it was consistent with the date of his death. The mass spectrometry result indicating the rich seafood diet was confirmed by a chemical isotope analysis of two teeth, a femur, and a rib. From the isotope analysis of carbon, nitrogen, and oxygen in the teeth and bones, the researchers discovered the diet included much freshwater fish and exotic birds such as swan, crane, and heron, and a vast quantity of wine—all items at the high end of the luxury market. Close analysis of the soil immediately below the skeleton revealed that the man had been infested with roundworm parasites when he died.

The excavators found an iron object under the skeleton's vertebrae and speculated it might be an arrowhead that had been embedded in its back. An X-ray analysis showed it was a nail, probably dating to Roman Britain, that had been in the ground by chance immediately under the grave, or was in soil disturbed when the grave was dug, and had nothing to do with the body.

== Identification of Richard III and other findings ==
On 4 February 2013, the University of Leicester confirmed that the skeleton was that of Richard III. The identification was based on mitochondrial DNA evidence, soil analysis, dental tests, and physical characteristics of the skeleton consistent with contemporary accounts of Richard's appearance. Osteoarchaeologist Jo Appleby commented: "The skeleton has a number of unusual features: its slender build, the scoliosis, and the battle-related trauma. All of these are highly consistent with the information that we have about Richard III in life and about the circumstances of his death."

Caroline Wilkinson, Professor of Craniofacial Identification at the University of Dundee, led the project to reconstruct the face, commissioned by the Richard III Society. On 11 February 2014, the University of Leicester announced a project headed by Turi King to sequence the entire genome of Richard III and Michael Ibsen—a direct female-line descendant of Richard's sister, Anne of York—whose mitochondrial DNA confirmed the identification of the excavated remains. Richard III is thus the first ancient person with known historical identity whose genome has been sequenced. A study published in Nature Communications in December 2014 confirmed a perfect whole-mitochondrial genome match between Richard's skeleton and Michael Ibsen and a near-perfect match between Richard and his other confirmed living relative. However, Y chromosome DNA inherited via the male line found no link with five other claimed living relatives, indicating that at least one "false-paternity event" occurred in the generations between Richard and these men. One of these five was found to be unrelated to the other four, showing that another false-paternity event had occurred in the four generations separating them.

The story of the excavation and subsequent scientific investigation was told in a Channel 4 documentary, Richard III: The King in the Car Park, broadcast on 4 February 2013. It proved a ratings hit for the channel, watched by up to 4.9 million viewers, and won a Royal Television Society award. Channel 4 subsequently screened a follow-up documentary on 27 February 2014, Richard III: The Unseen Story, which detailed the scientific and archaeological analyses that led to the identification of the skeleton as Richard III.

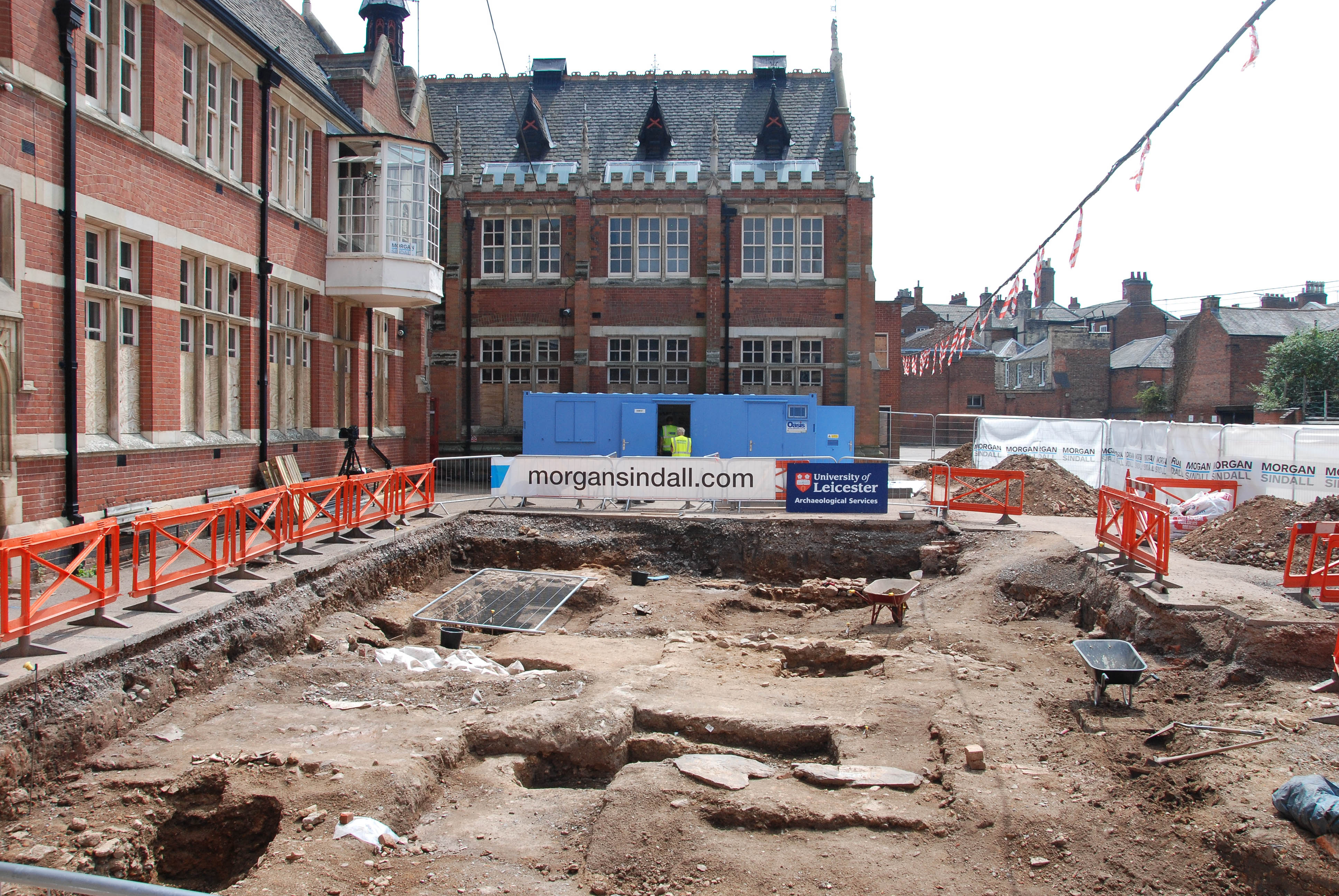
The July 2013 excavation, which uncovered more of Greyfriars and exhumed several other burials

The site was re-excavated in July 2013 to learn more about the friary church, before building work on the adjacent disused school building. In a project co-funded by Leicester City Council and the University of Leicester, a single trench about twice the area of the 2012 trenches was excavated. It succeeded in exposing the entirety of the sites of the Greyfriars presbytery and choir sites, confirming archaeologists' earlier hypotheses about the layout of the church's east end. Three burials identified but not excavated in the 2012 project were tackled afresh. One burial was found to have been interred in a wooden coffin in a well-dug grave, while a second wooden-coffined burial was found under and astride the choir and presbytery; its position suggests that it pre-dates the church.

A stone coffin found during the 2012 excavation was opened for the first time, revealing a lead coffin inside. An investigation with an endoscope revealed the presence of a skeleton along with some head hair and fragments of a shroud and cord. The skeleton was at first assumed to be male, perhaps that of a knight, William de Moton, who was known to have been buried there, but later examination showed it to be of a woman—perhaps a high-ranking benefactor. She may not necessarily have been local, as lead coffins were used to transport corpses over long distances.

=== Plans and challenges ===
The University of Leicester's plan to inter Richard's body in Leicester Cathedral was in keeping with British legal norms, which hold that Christian burials excavated by archaeologists should be reburied in the nearest consecrated ground to the original grave, and was a condition of the licence granted by the Ministry of Justice to exhume any human remains found during the excavation. The British royal family made no claim on the remains—Queen Elizabeth II was reportedly consulted but rejected the idea of a royal burial—so the Ministry of Justice initially confirmed that the University of Leicester would make the final decision on where the bones should be re-buried. David Monteith, Canon Chancellor of Leicester Cathedral, said Richard's skeleton would be reinterred at the cathedral in early 2014 in a "Christian-led but ecumenical service", not a formal reburial but rather a service of remembrance, as a funeral service would have been held at the time of burial.

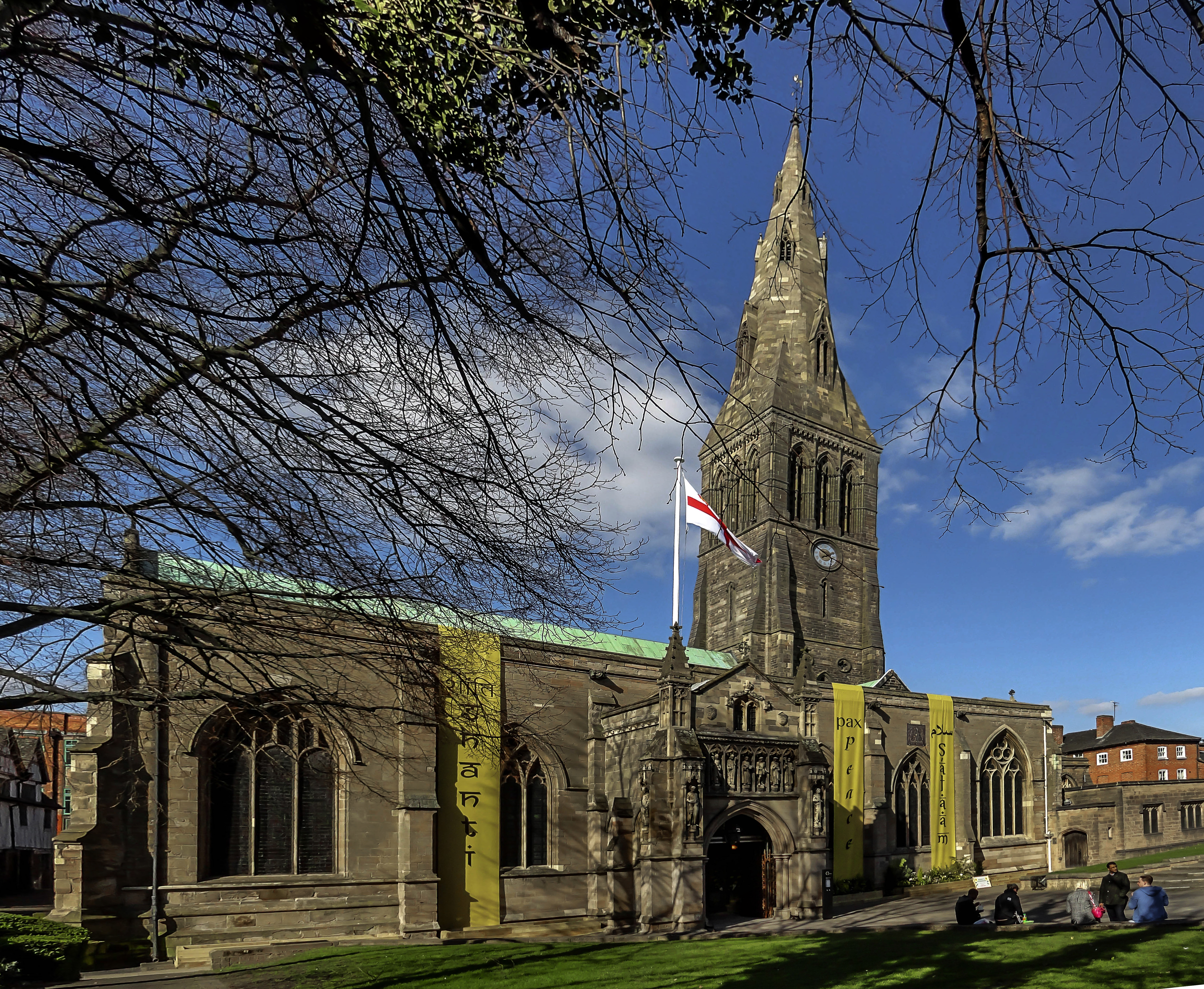
Leicester Cathedral, where Richard III was reburied in March 2015

The choice of burial site proved controversial, and proposals were made for Richard to be buried in places which some felt were more fitting for a Roman Catholic and Yorkist monarch. Online petitions were launched calling for Richard to be buried in Westminster Abbey, (Note: Richard's wife Anne Neville is buried within Westminster Abbey; it is uncertain where their only child Edward of Middleham, Prince of Wales, is buried; theories have included Sheriff Hutton Church, or Middleham, both in North Yorkshire.) where 17 other English and British kings are interred; York Minster, which some claimed was Richard's own preferred burial site; the Roman Catholic Arundel Cathedral; or in the Leicester car park in which his body was found. Only two options received significant public support, with Leicester receiving 3,100 more signatures than York. The issue was discussed in the Houses of Parliament; the Conservative MP and historian Chris Skidmore proposed that a state funeral should be held, while John Mann, the Labour MP for Bassetlaw, suggested that the body should be buried in Worksop in his constituency—halfway between York and Leicester. All options were rejected in Leicester, whose mayor Peter Soulsby retorted: "Those bones leave Leicester over my dead body."

After legal action brought by the Plantagenet Alliance, a group representing claimed descendants of Richard's siblings, his final resting place remained uncertain for nearly a year. The group, which described itself as "his Majesty's representatives and voice", called for Richard to be buried in York Minster, which they claimed was his "wish". The Dean of Leicester called their challenge "disrespectful", and said that the cathedral would not invest any more money until the matter was decided. Historians said there was no evidence that Richard III wanted to be buried in York. Mark Ormrod of the University of York expressed scepticism over the idea that Richard had devised any clear plans for his own burial. The standing of the Plantagenet Alliance was challenged. Mathematician Rob Eastaway calculated that Richard III's siblings may have millions of living descendants, saying that "we should all have the chance to vote on Leicester versus York".

In August 2013, Mr. Justice Haddon-Cave gave the Plantagenet Alliance permission for a judicial review since the original burial plans ignored the common law duty "to consult widely as to how and where Richard III's remains should appropriately be reinterred". The judicial review opened on 13 March 2014 and was expected to last two days but the decision was deferred for four to six weeks. Lady Justice Hallett, sitting with Mr. Justice Ouseley and Justice Haddon-Cave, said the court would take time to consider its judgment. On 23 May, the High Court ruled there was "no duty to consult" and "no public law grounds for the court to interfere", so reburial in Leicester could proceed. The litigation cost the defendants £245,000—far more than the cost of the original investigation.

== Reburial and commemorations ==
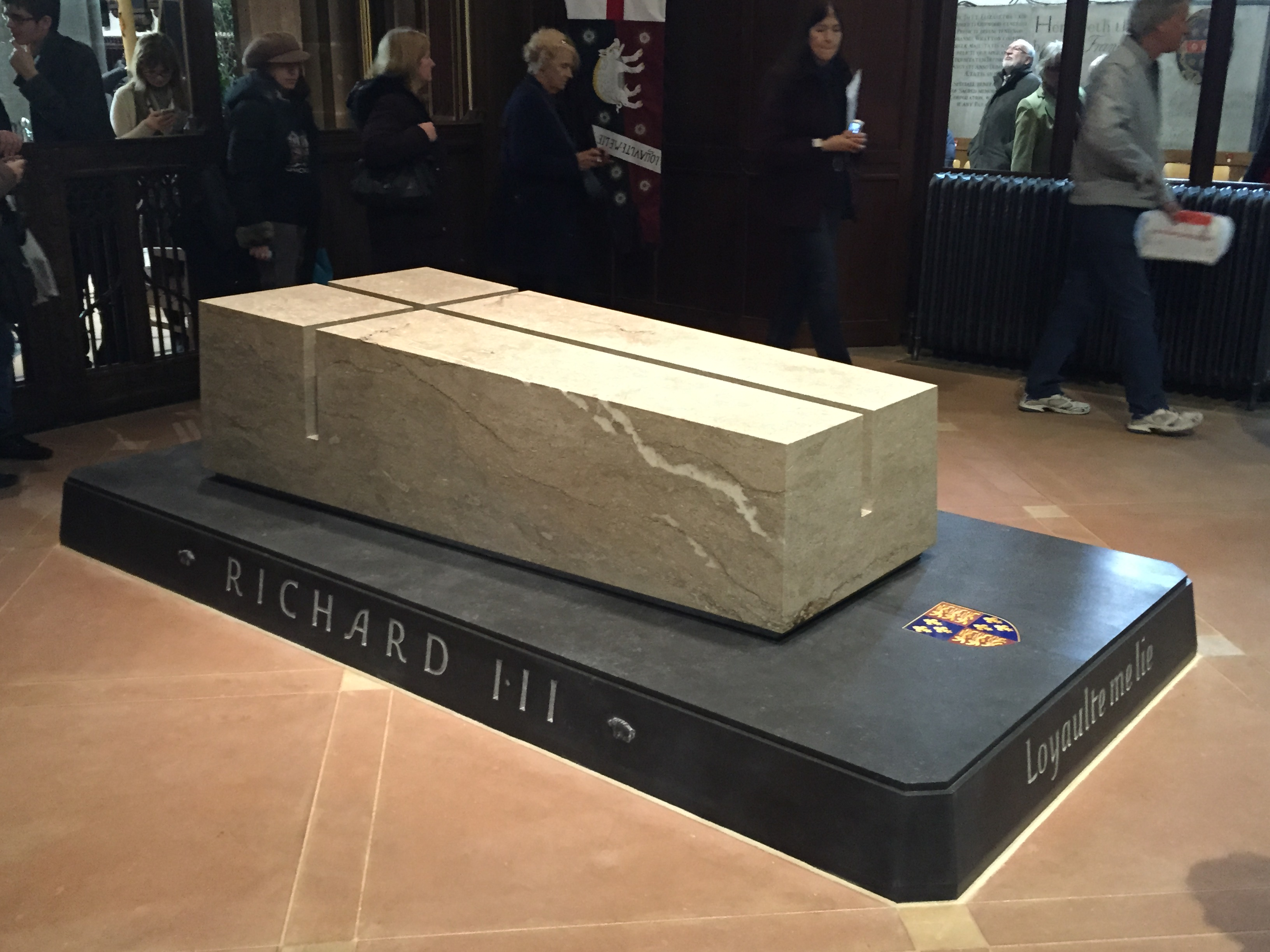
The 2015 tomb of Richard III

In February 2013, Leicester Cathedral announced a procedure and timetable for the reinterment of Richard's remains. The cathedral authorities planned to bury him in a "place of honour" within the cathedral. Initial plans for a flat ledger stone, perhaps modifying the memorial stone installed in the chancel in 1982, proved unpopular. A table tomb was the most popular option among members of the Richard III Society and in polls of Leicester people. In June 2014 the design was announced, in the form of a table tomb of Swaledale fossil stone on a Kilkenny marble plinth. That month, the statue of Richard III that had stood in Leicester's Castle Gardens was moved to the redesigned Cathedral Gardens, which were reopened on 5 July 2014.

The reburial took place during a week of events between 22 and 27 March 2015. The sequence of events included:

- Sunday 22 March 2015: Richard's bones were sealed in a lead-lined ossuary and placed in a wooden coffin. The remains were moved from the University of Leicester to Leicester Cathedral via the site of the Battle of Bosworth at Fenn Lane Farm and through Dadlington, Sutton Cheney, Bosworth Battlefield Heritage Centre on Ambion Hill, and Market Bosworth retracing part of Richard's last journey. The coffin, made from English oak from the Duchy of Cornwall estate by Michael Ibsen, was transferred from a motor hearse to a four-horse-drawn hearse for entry into the city of Leicester.
- Monday 23 – Wednesday 25 March 2015: Remains lay in repose in the cathedral. Waiting times to view the coffin were reported to exceed four hours.
- Monday 23 March 2015: Cardinal Vincent Nichols, Archbishop of Westminster, celebrated a Requiem Mass for Richard III's soul in Holy Cross Priory Church, Leicester's principal Roman Catholic Church. Music for the introit 'In memoriam; Ricardus Rex' was composed by Graham Keitch.
- Thursday 26 March 2015: Reburial in the presence of Justin Welby, Archbishop of Canterbury, and Tim Stevens, Bishop of Leicester. The service, shown live on Channel 4, included memorial prayers for Richard III and the victims of Bosworth and other conflicts. Actor Benedict Cumberbatch, a distant relative of Richard III, who would soon portray him in the BBC Shakespeare adaptation The Hollow Crown, read a poem written for the service by the poet laureate, Carol Ann Duffy. The royal family was represented by Sophie, Countess of Wessex, Prince Richard, Duke of Gloucester, and Birgitte, Duchess of Gloucester—Richard III was Duke of Gloucester before his accession. Music during the service included a setting of Psalm 138 by Leonel Power; Ghostly Grace, an anthem composed for the service by Judith Bingham; a setting of Psalm 150 by Philip Moore; and an arrangement of "God Save the Queen" by Judith Weir.
- Friday 27 March 2015: Unveiling the tomb to the public, in a Service of Reveal at Leicester Cathedral, followed by commemorations across Leicester.

== Reactions ==
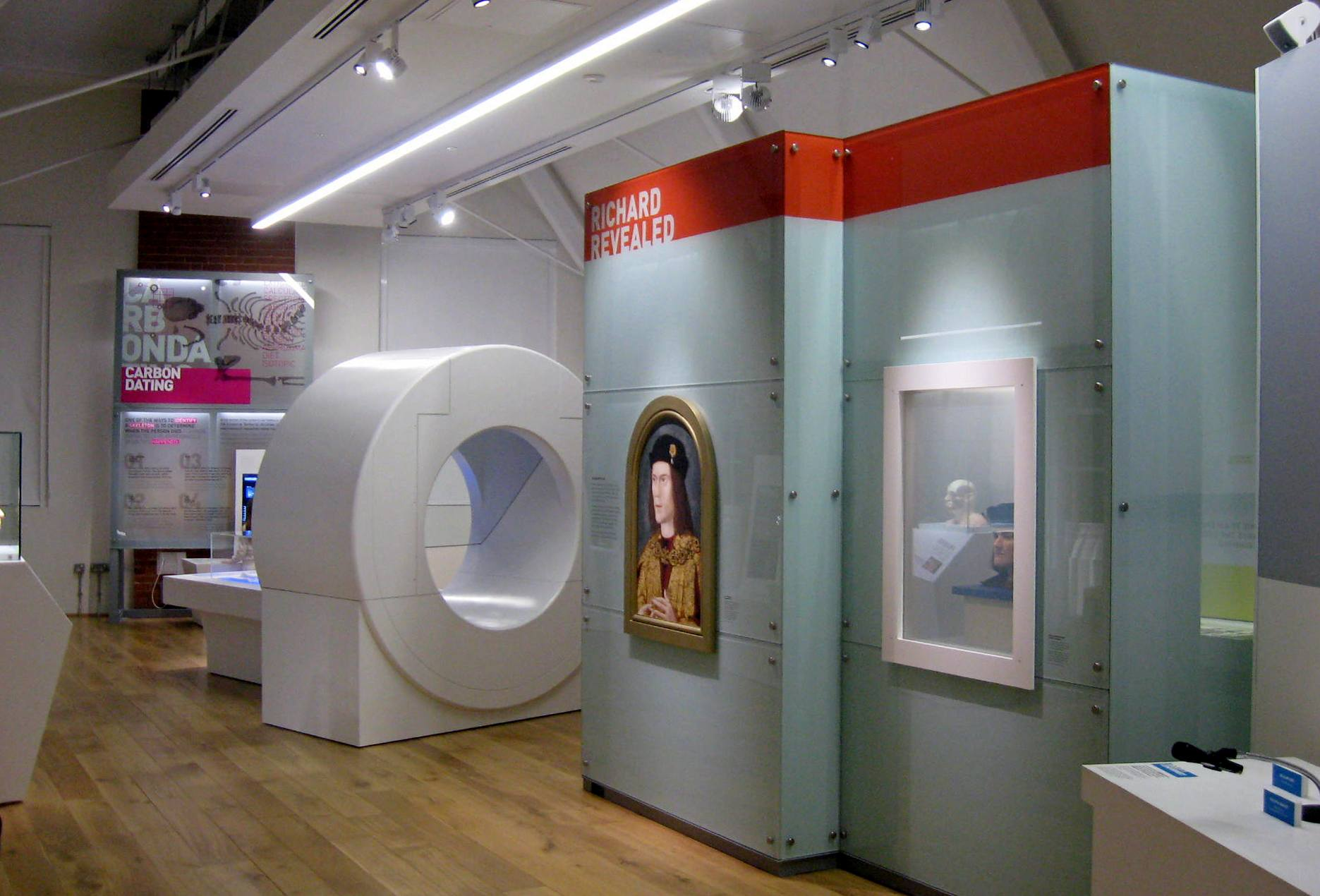
One of the galleries in the King Richard III Visitor Centre in Leicester

After the discovery, Leicester City Council set up a temporary exhibition about Richard III in the city's medieval guildhall. The council announced it would create a permanent attraction and subsequently spent £850,000 to buy the freehold of St Martin's Place, formerly part of Leicester Grammar School, in Peacock Lane, across the road from the cathedral. The site adjoins the car park where the body was found, and overlies the chancel of Greyfriars Friary Church. It was converted into the £4.5 million King Richard III Visitor Centre, telling the story of Richard's life, death, burial and rediscovery, with artefacts from the dig including Philippa Langley's Wellington boots and the hard hat and high-visibility jacket worn by archaeologist Mathew Morris on the day he found Richard's skeleton. Visitors can see the grave site under a glass floor. The council anticipated that the visitor centre, which opened in July 2014, would attract 100,000 visitors a year.

In Norway, archaeologist Øystein Ekroll hoped that the interest in the discovery of the English king would spill over to Norway. In contrast to England where, with the possible exceptions of Henry I and Edward V, all the gravesites of English and British monarchs since the 11th century have now been discovered, in Norway about 25 medieval kings are buried in unmarked graves around the country. Ekroll proposed to start with Harald Hardrada, who was probably buried anonymously in Trondheim, beneath what is today a public road. A previous attempt to exhume Harald in 2006 was blocked by the Norwegian Directorate for Cultural Heritage (Riksantikvaren).

Richard Buckley of the University of Leicester Archaeological Services, who said he would "eat his hat" if Richard was discovered, fulfilled his promise by eating a hat-shaped cake baked by a colleague. Buckley later said:

Cutting-edge research has been used in the project and the work has really only just begun. The discoveries, such as the very precise carbon dating and medical evidence, will serve as a benchmark for other studies. And it is, of course, an incredible story. He's a controversial figure; people love the idea he was found under a car park; the whole thing unfolded in the most amazing way. You couldn't make it up.

A few days after the burial, Leicester City F.C. began a winning streak to take them from bottom of the Premier League to comfortably avoiding relegation, and they went on to win the league the following year. Mayor Peter Soulsby said:

For too long, people in Leicester have been modest about their achievements and the city they live in. Now – thanks first to the discovery of King Richard III and the Foxes' phenomenal season – it's our time to step into the international limelight.

The two events inspired Michael Morpurgo's 2016 children's book The Fox and the Ghost King, in which the ghost of Richard III promises to help the football team in return for being released from his car park grave. In 2022, Stephen Frears directed the British comedy-drama film The Lost King, which follows Langley's search for King Richard III's remains.

== Bibliography ==
- Ashdown-Hill, John (2013). The Last Days of Richard III and the Fate of His DNA. Stroud, England: The History Press. ISBN 978-0-7524-9205-6.
- Ashdown-Hill, John; David Johnson; Wendy Johnson; Pippa Langley (2014). Carson, Annette (ed.). Finding Richard III: The Official Account of Research by the Retrieval & Reburial Project. Horstead: Imprimis Imprimatur. ISBN 978-0-9576840-2-7. Archived from the original on 28 April 2024.
- Baldwin, David (1986). "King Richard's Grave in Leicester" (PDF). Transactions. 60. Leicester Archaeological and Historical Society. Archived (PDF) from the original on 4 February 2012.
- Bennett, Michael John (1985). The Battle of Bosworth. Gloucester: Alan Sutton. ISBN 978-0-8629-9053-4.
- Buckley, Richard; Mathew Morris; Jo Appleby; Turi King; Deirdre O'Sullivan; Lin Foxhall (2013). ""The King in the Car Park": New Light on the Death and Burial of Richard III in the Grey Friars Church, Leicester, in 1485". Antiquity. 87 (336): 519–538. doi:10.1017/s0003598x00049103.
- Griffiths, Ralph A. (1993). Sir Rhys ap Thomas and His Family: A Study in the Wars of the Roses and Early Tudor Politics. Cardiff: University of Wales Press. ISBN 978-0708312186.
- Halsted, Caroline Amelia (1844). Richard III, as Duke of Gloucester and King of England. Volume 2. Carey and Hart. OCLC 2606580.
- The Grey Friars Research Team; Kennedy, Maev; Foxhall, Lin (2015). The Bones of a King: Richard III Rediscovered. Wiley-Blackwell. ISBN 978-1118783146.
- Hipshon, David (2009). Richard III and the Death of Chivalry. History Press. ISBN 978-0750950749.
- Johnston, Dafydd, ed. (2013). "Moliant i Syr Rhys ap Tomas o Abermarlais". Guto'r Glyn.net. Aberystwyth: Centre for Advanced Welsh and Celtic Studies. Archived from the original on 19 June 2015.
- King, TE; Gonzalez Fortes, G; Balaresque, P; Thomas, MG; Balding, D; Maisano Delser, P; Neumann, Rita; Parson, Walther; Knapp, Michael; Walsh, Susan; Tonasso, Laure; Holt, John; Kayser, Manfred; Appleby, Jo; Forster, Peter; Ekserdjian, David; Hofreiter, Michael; Schürer, Kevin (2014). "Identification of the remains of King Richard III". Nature Communications. 5 (5631): 5631. Bibcode:2014NatCo...5.5631K. doi:10.1038/ncomms6631. PMC 4268703. PMID 25463651.
- Langley, Philippa; Jones, Michael (2014). The Search for Richard III: The King's Grave. John Murray. ISBN 978-1-84854-893-0.
- Mathew, Morris; Richard Buckley (2013). Richard III: The King Under the Car Park. Leicester: University of Leicester Archaeological Services. ISBN 978-0-9574792-2-7.
- Penn, Thomas (2011). Winter King – Henry VII and the Dawn of Tudor England. Simon & Schuster. ISBN 978-1-4391-9156-9.
- Pitts, Mike (2014). Digging for Richard III: How Archaeology Found the King. London: Thames and Hudson. ISBN 978-0-500-25200-0.
- Rees, EA (2008). A Life of Guto'r Glyn. Tal-y-bont, Ceredigion: Y Lolfa. ISBN 978-0-86243-971-2.
- Rhodes, Neil (1997). English Renaissance Prose: History, Language, and Politics. Tempe, AZ: Medieval & Renaissance Texts & Studies. ISBN 978-0-8669-8205-4.
