= Plantagenet Alliance =

Campaign group in the United Kingdom

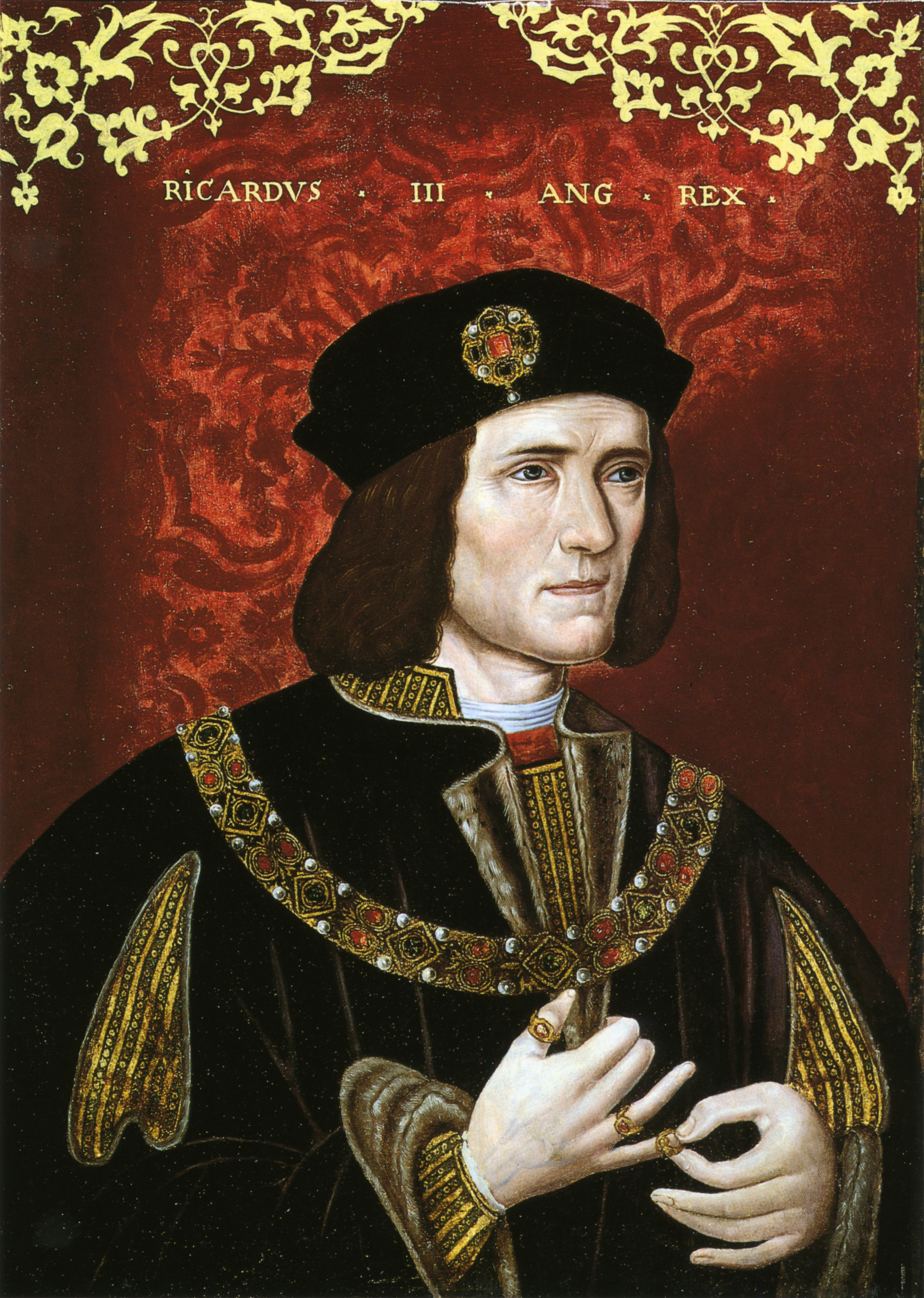
Richard III, reigned 1483–1485

The Plantagenet Alliance was a small grouping of individuals claiming to be descendants of the House of Plantagenet. The Alliance was formed in 2013 shortly after the discovery and identification of the remains of Richard III, the last Plantagenet king of England who died in 1485, in order to advance their views on the location of Richard's reburial. Reports of the number of members of the Alliance varied between fifteen and around forty.

In 2013 and 2014 the group campaigned to have Richard re-interred at York Minster, believing that, as his collateral descendants, (Note: A collateral descendant, in contrast to a lineal descendant, is someone who is not directly descended from the individual in question but, instead, shares a common ancestor with that individual; for example, they may be descended from the individual’s brother, sister, aunt or uncle. Richard III died without leaving any lineal descendants.) they knew his wishes. They referred to themselves as "his Majesty's representatives and voice". However, historians disputed that there was any evidence that Richard III wanted to be buried in York. The Plantagenet Alliance's standing to represent Richard was also challenged on the basis that he would have had many millions of other living collateral descendants whose views were not necessarily represented by the Alliance.

The Alliance's activities included initiating a judicial review of decisions taken by the Ministry of Justice relating to the proposed re-interment in Leicester. The Alliance lost the judicial review in 2014 and the campaign to have Richard's remains buried in York failed. The group has not been publicly active since the loss of the court case. Richard III's remains were finally re-interred within the interior of the Leicester Cathedral on 26 March 2015.

== Background and formation ==
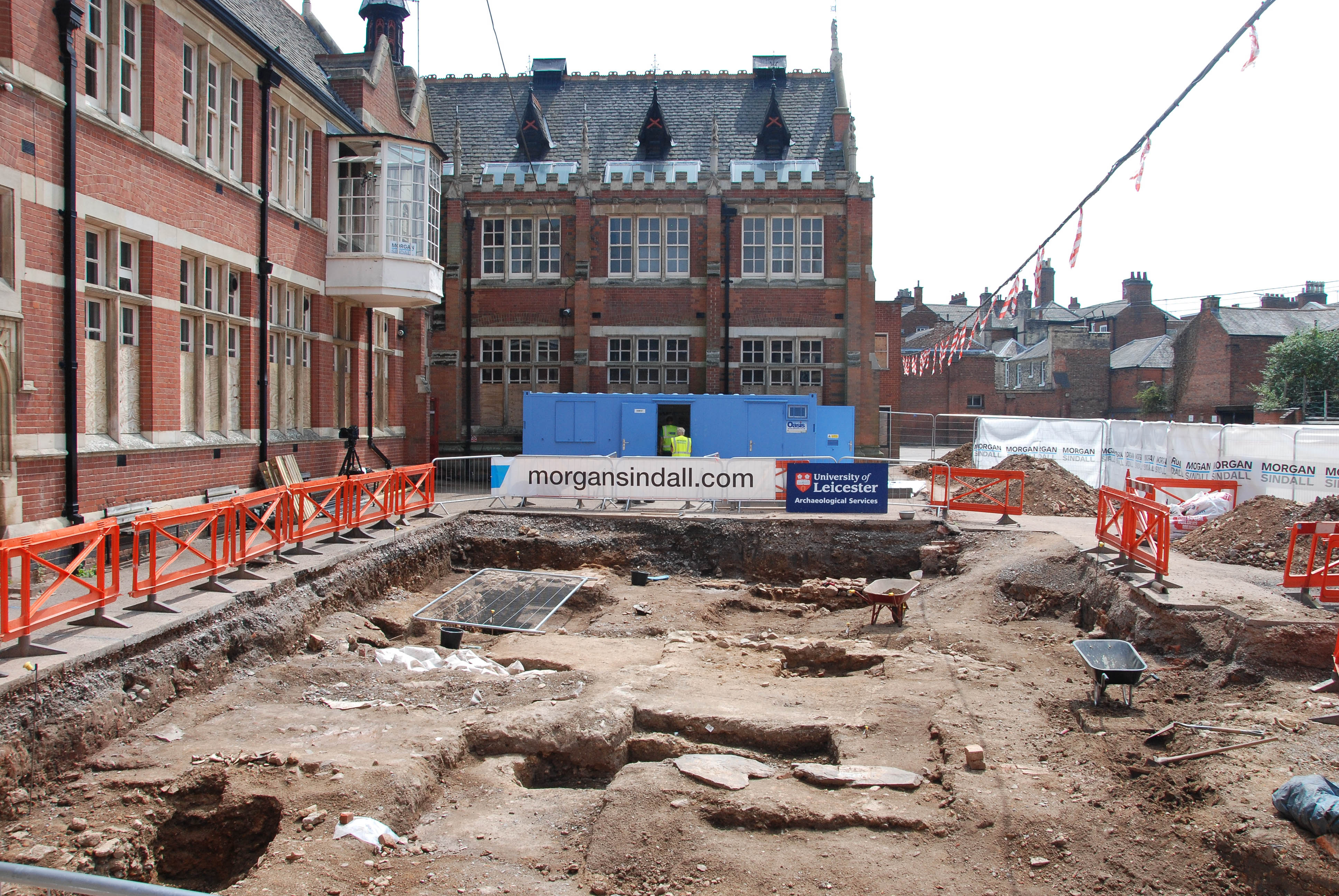
The archaeological dig at a council car park in Leicester, which resulted in the discovery of Richard III's remains

In September 2012, an archaeological dig led by the University of Leicester resulted in the remains of Richard III, who was killed at the Battle of Bosworth Field in 1485, being discovered underneath a council car park in Leicester. The Ministry of Justice announced in February 2013 that the university had the authority to determine the location of Richard's reburial under the terms of the licence it had been granted to carry out the archaeological exhumation. The University of Leicester subsequently confirmed that it had always been its intention that the remains should be re-interred in Leicester Cathedral.

According to a BBC report and The Guardian journalist Joshua Rozenberg, Stephen Nicolay, a descendant of Richard III's sister, founded the Plantagenet Alliance shortly after confirmation, in February 2013, that it had been Richard's remains that had been discovered the previous year. According to the BBC report and Rozenberg, Nicolay formed the group with other "collateral [non-direct] descendants" with the aim of having Richard buried at York Minster. However, Vanessa Roe, another member of the group, told Prospect Magazine, in an interview, that the Plantagenet Alliance came about as a result of her contacting York City Council after she had seen a Channel 4 documentary about the exhumation and identification of Richard III's remains. The council had put her in touch with others who claimed to be related to Richard.

== Name and composition ==
The Alliance is a group of individuals who believe they are descendants of relatives of Richard III. Specifically they claim to be 16th, 17th and 18th great-nieces and great-nephews of Richard. The Alliance took their name from the House of Plantagenet, the medieval royal dynasty, of which Richard III was the last king. In March 2013, it was reported that they numbered fifteen, but a subsequent report, in December 2013, stated that there were "around forty" in the Alliance. The full group has never met in person.

Prominent members include Stephen Nicolay, Vanessa Roe and Charles Brunner. Nicolay, a self-employed gardener, is a 16th great-nephew of Richard through his sister, Anne of York. He was unaware of his relationship to Richard until late 2011 and he received confirmation that he was a 16th great-nephew in early 2012. Vanessa Roe, who runs a small farm near York and works with young people with disabilities, is a 16th great-niece of Richard III. She is descended from Richard's brother, George, Duke of Clarence and has said that she has always been aware of her Plantagenet ancestry. Roe has been described as the "group's spokesperson". Charles Brunner is an American and owns a night-club in Kansas. He is a 17th great-nephew of the king, and a descendant of Richard's sister, Anne of York. He has been described as "one of the leaders" of the Alliance.

== Views ==
The competing locations for Richard III's reburial

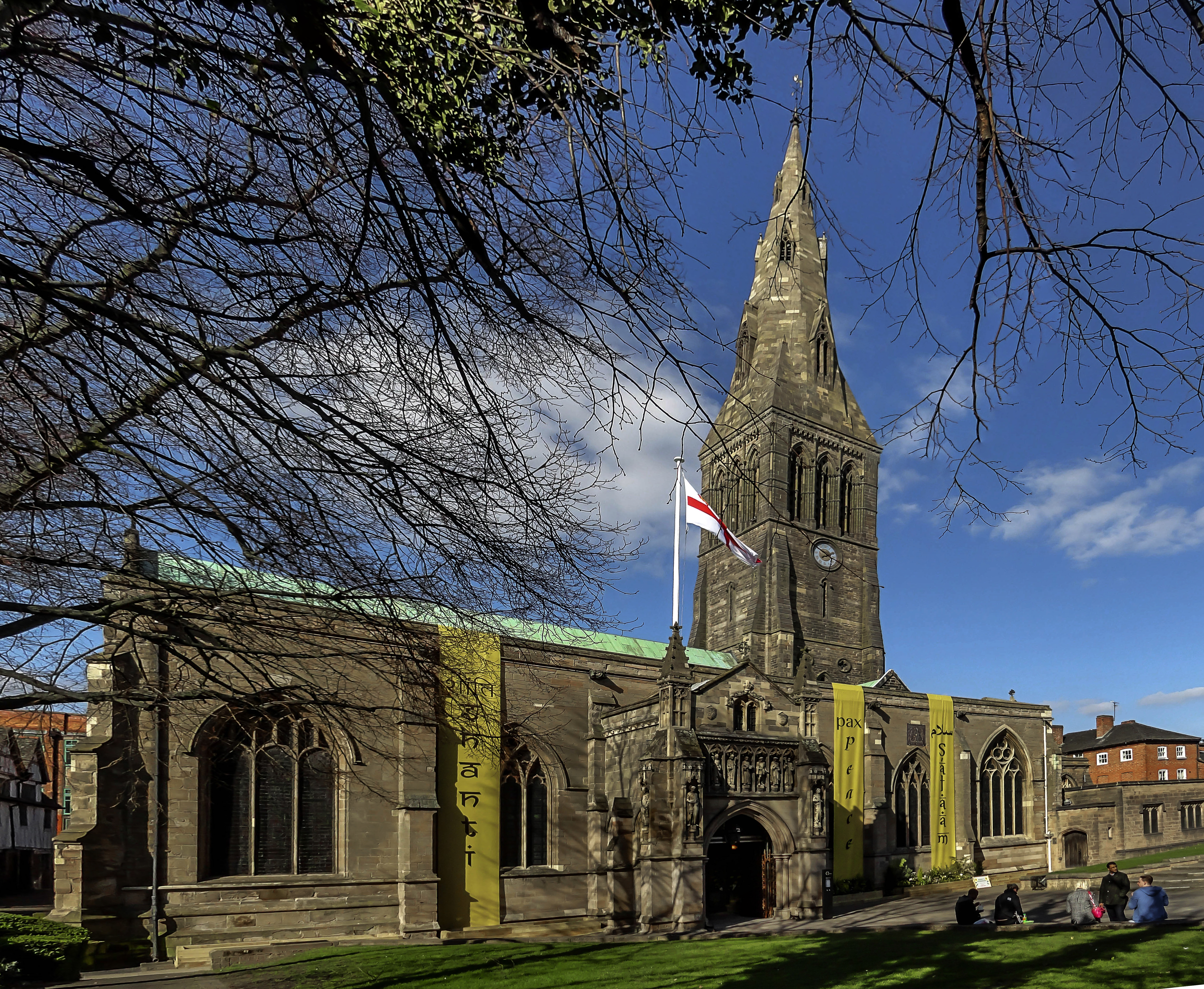
Leicester Cathedral, where Richard was re-interred in March 2015

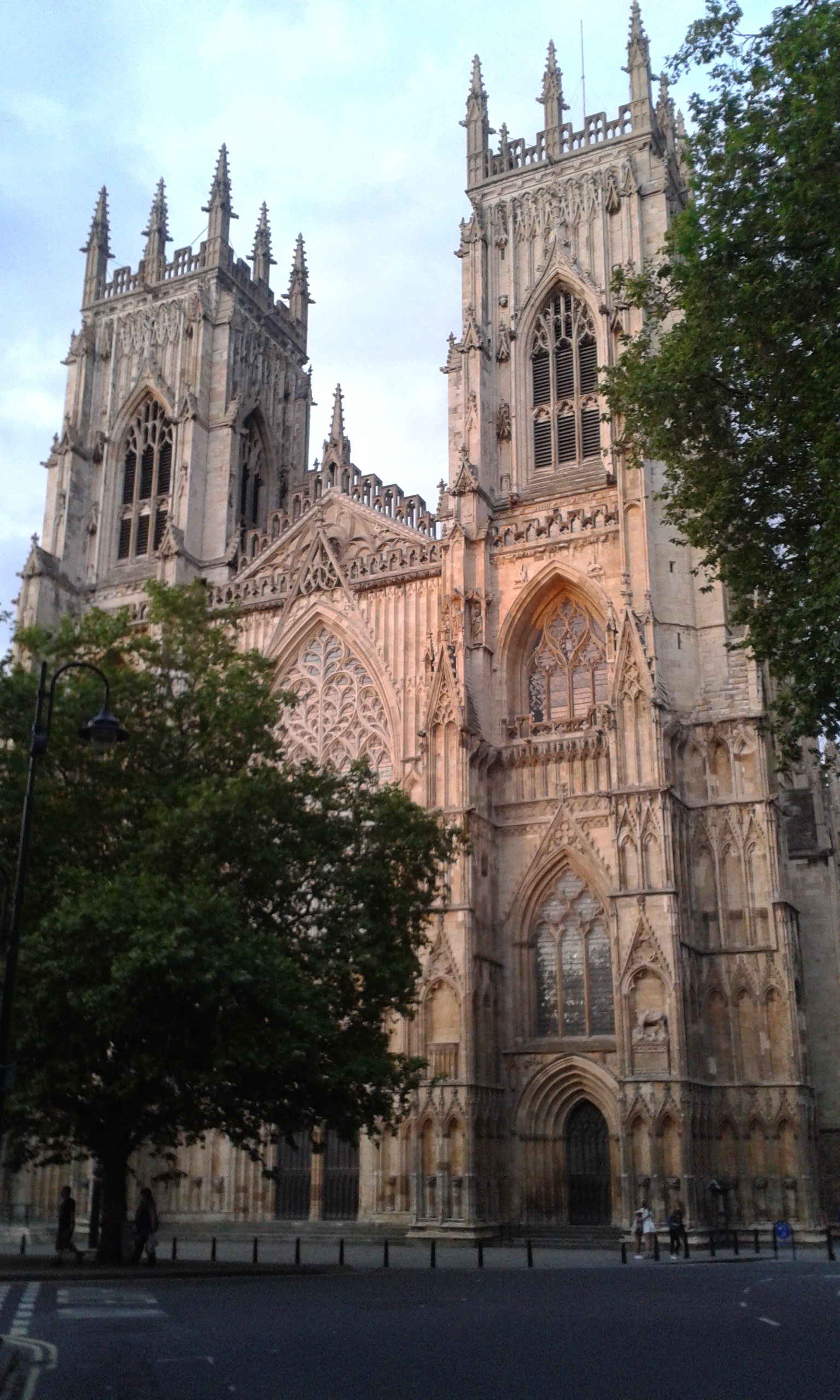
York Minster, favoured by the Plantagenet Alliance but not chosen

In February 2013, the Plantagenet Alliance issued a statement declaring its views on the burial place of Richard III:

The Plantagenet Alliance does hereby most respectfully demand that the remains of King Richard III, the last Plantagenet King of England and our mutual, collateral ancestor, be returned to the City of York for ceremonial reburial. We believe that such an interment was the desire of King Richard in life and we have written this statement so that his inferred wishes may be fully recognised.

The group claims to speak on behalf of Richard III and to know his wishes by virtue of their claimed family connection. It described itself as "his Majesty's representatives and voice". The BBC referred to the group feeling "an almost supernatural bond" with Richard and Charles Brunner called it an "ancestral memory". Vanessa Roe stated in 2013:

Who do we think we are? We don't think we are anyone – we know who we are. We are the collateral [non-direct] descendants of Richard III, we speak on behalf of him, the only people who can speak on behalf of him…we decided he needed someone to fight for him…Many of us have grown up knowing about Richard, we know what he wanted.

The group claimed it was Richard's "wish" to be buried in York and called for his re-interment to take place within York Minster. In support of their belief, the alliance pointed to his connections with Yorkshire: he grew up in the county, was known as "Richard of York" prior to becoming king and visited York often during his reign.

== Campaign ==
=== e-Petition ===
The Alliance launched a UK Government online "e-Petition" in 2013 in support of their call to have Richard re-buried in York. e-Petitions that receive at least 100,000 signatures become eligible to have their proposal debated in Parliament. However, when the Alliance petition closed on 24 September 2013 it failed to achieve the necessary target, having received only 31,276 signatures.

=== Litigation ===
In 2013, the Plantagenet Alliance commenced judicial review proceedings, complaining that they had not been consulted on Richard's place of burial thereby violating their human rights, and which resulted in a court hearing in May 2014. In March 2013, Matthew Howarth of the Leeds firm of solicitors, Gordons, announced that he had written to the Ministry of Justice on behalf of the Plantagenet Alliance claiming that the Ministry had breached Article 8 of the European Convention on Human Rights in the terms of the archaeological exhumation licence it had issued to the University of Leicester. Article 8 includes the right to respect for family life, and is considered to be one of the convention's most open-ended provisions. The Alliance's claim was specifically that their human rights had been breached because they had not been consulted on the place of reburial. The licence specified that re-interment was to be in Leicester, and they claimed the failure to consult them, as Richard's relatives, violated their Article 8 rights.

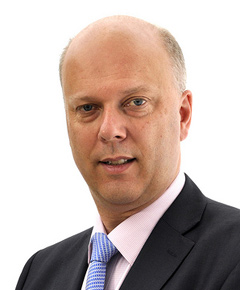
Chris Grayling, the Secretary of State for Justice at the time, criticised the Plantagenet Alliance, calling their case "nonsensical".

Chris Grayling, the Secretary of State for Justice at the time, rejected the claim and the Alliance therefore commenced proceedings for judicial review of the Ministry of Justice's decision not to consult on the terms of the licence. The litigation was undertaken by the Alliance's solicitors, Gordons, and by their counsel, Gerard Clarke and Tom Cleaver of Blackstone Chambers, on a contingency fee basis – that is, they would only have their fees paid if they win and the court consequently orders that the other side has to pay their legal costs. The proceedings were brought by a company called Plantagenet Alliance Limited, owned and controlled solely by Stephen Nicolay, and which The Telegraph subsequently described as "a 'front' company...with no assets, to avoid being hit with legal costs."

At a preliminary hearing in August 2013 the court gave permission to the Alliance to proceed with the judicial review and granted them a full "protective costs order". The protective costs order meant that the Alliance would not have to pay the Ministry's legal costs even if the Alliance lost the case. (Note: Normally in UK litigation, the "Indemnity Rule" applies and the "loser" pays the "winner's" costs.) The judge explained that such orders were granted in judicial review cases where it was in the public interest for the courts to hear the case and it might "otherwise be stifled for lack of financial means".

In May 2014 the case was heard by three High Court judges who ruled in favour of the Ministry of Justice. The judges said there was no "legitimate expectation" that Richard's "collateral descendants would be consulted after centuries in relation to an exhumed historical figure". They also concluded that any consultation was "not capable of sensible limit" since Richard's collateral descendants could number millions of people.

After the decision, Vanessa Roe said that the judgment meant there was "no justice" for Richard III. Chris Grayling, on the other hand, criticised the Plantagenet Alliance for bringing the case, saying that it was "a group with tenuous claims to being relatives of Richard III" and that he was "frustrated and angry" that they had "taken up so much time and public money." He added that:

This nonsensical case is a perfect example of how the system of judicial review is being misused – and at ridiculous expense to taxpayers. Judicial review is, and must remain, an important way to hold authorities to account but we have to do something to stop challenges like this exploiting the system.

The legal costs of the Ministry of Justice and Leicester City Council, which was also a party to the case, amounted to £175,000. Together with the expense of a three-day court hearing the total likely cost to the British taxpayer has been estimated to be in excess of £200,000.

=== Other reactions ===
In response to the Alliance's claims, historians said that there was no evidence that Richard III wanted to be buried in York. Mark Ormrod of the University of York expressed scepticism over the idea that Richard had devised any clear plans for his own burial. The standing of the Plantagenet Alliance was also challenged. Mathematician Rob Eastaway calculated that Richard III may have millions of living collateral descendants, saying that "we should all have the chance to vote on Leicester versus York".

Although the Alliance lost their judicial review case, the High Court ruling is cited as authority in administrative law for when there is or is not a legal duty to consult those affected by administrative governmental decisions.

== Re-interment in Leicester ==
Plans for the reburial had been "on hold" while the outcome of the court case was awaited. David Monteith. the Dean of Leicester called the Plantagenet Alliance's challenge "disrespectful", and said that the cathedral would not be investing funding in the re-interment project until the matter was resolved. Once the High Court decision rejecting the Alliance's claim was issued in May 2014, Tim Stevens, the then Bishop of Leicester, announced that the re-interment would proceed at Leicester Cathedral the following spring. The re-interment took place on 26 March 2015.

== See also ==
- King Richard III Visitor Centre
- Philippa Langley
