= Charles Hancock =

Charles or Charlie Hancock may refer to:

- Charles Hancock (organist) (1852–1927), English organist and composer
- Charles Hancock (painter) (c. 1800–1877), British painter
- Charlie Hancock (baseball) (1902–1974), American Negro league baseball catcher
- Charlie Hancock (rugby union) (born 1998), Australian rugby union player
