= Samuel Knight (bishop) =

Samuel Kirshbaum Knight was a suffragan bishop from 1924 until his death in 1932.

Born in 1868 and educated at Trinity College, Dublin he was ordained in 1892. His first post was as a curate at Wardleworth after which he was successively Priest-in-charge at St Paul’s Barking and Vicar of St Mark’s Notting Hill before being appointed a Lecturer at King's College London. In 1919 he moved to the North East to becoming the Rural Dean for the Houghton-le-Spring area, then a Canon Residentiary at Durham Cathedral and finally in 1924 the Bishop of Jarrow.
He was married to Emmeline Cicely Knight, who died on 26 November 1955, aged 83. They are buried together in St Cuthbert's Cemetery, Durham.

Religious titles
Preceded by John Nathaniel Quirk	Bishop of Jarrow; 1924–1932	Succeeded by James Geoffrey Gordon
