= Dean of Leicester =

Church of England senior clergy member

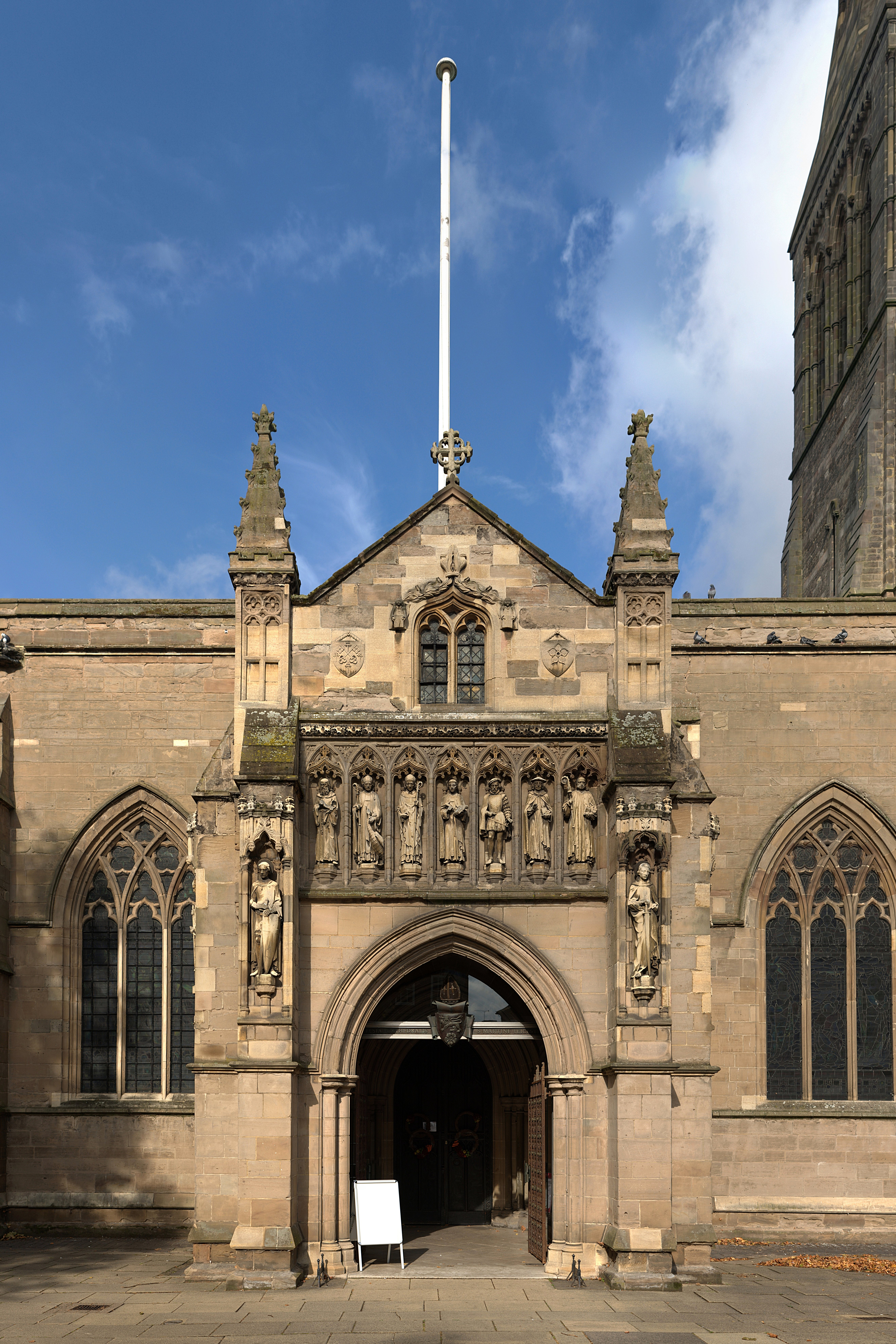
Leicester Cathedral

The Dean of Leicester is the head (primus inter pares – first among equals) and chair of the chapter of canons, the ruling body of Leicester Cathedral. The dean and chapter are based at the Cathedral Church of Saint Martin in Leicester. Before 2000 the post was designated as a provost, which was then the equivalent of a dean at most English cathedrals. The cathedral is the mother church of the Diocese of Leicester and seat of the Bishop of Leicester.

== List of deans ==
=== Provosts ===
- 1927–1934 Frederick MacNutt (also Archdeacon of Leicester, 1921–1938)
- 1938–1954 Herbert Jones (afterwards Dean of Manchester, 1954)
- 1954–1958 Mervyn Armstrong (afterwards Bishop of Jarrow, 1958)
- 1958–1963 Richard Mayston
- 1963–1978 John Hughes
- 1978–1992 Alan Warren
- 1992–1999 Derek Hole
- 2000–2002 Viv Faull (became Dean)

=== Deans ===
- 2002–2012 Viv Faull
- 2012-2013 Barry Naylor (acting)
- 2013–2022 David Monteith
- 2024–present Karen Rooms
