= Jitesh Patel =

The Reverend Jitesh Patel
- Associate vicar at Holy Trinity Church, Leicester
- Church: Church of England
- Diocese: Diocese of Leicester
- In office: 2018 to present
- Previous posts: Bishop-designate of Jarrow (2026); Assistant director of St Mellitus College East Midlands (2019–present)

Orders
- Ordination: 2010 (deaocn); 2011 (priest)

Personal details
- Born: June 1982 (age 44)
- Denomination: Anglicanism
- Education: Jesus College, Oxford; Kellogg College, Oxford; Wycliffe Hall, Oxford

Jitesh Krisnakant Patel (born June 1982) is a British Anglican priest and academic. He has been an associate vicar at Holy Trinity Church, Leicester since 2018, and assistant director and a lecturer in Theology at St Mellitus College East Midlands. In October 2026, he was announced as the next Bishop of Jarrow, the suffragan bishop of the Diocese of Durham.

== Biography ==
Patel was born in June 1982, to a Hindu Indian diaspora family. He grew up in Leicester, Leicestershire, England. He studied physics at Jesus College, Oxford, graduating with a Master of Physics (MPhys) degree in 2004. He converted to Christianity while studying at the University of Oxford. He completed a Postgraduate Certificate in Education (PGCE) at Kellogg College, Oxford, in 2006. He trained for ordination at Wycliffe Hall, Oxford, an evangelical Anglican theological college. During this time, he also studied theology at the University of Oxford, graduating with a Bachelor of Arts (BA) degree in 2009; as per tradition, his BA was promoted to a Master of Arts (MA Oxon).

Patel was ordained in the Church of England as a deacon in 2010 and as a priest in 2011. He served his curacy at Christ Church, Abingdon in the Diocese of Oxford. Then, in 2015, he moved to the Diocese of Portsmouth where he was appointed associate vicar at St Jude's Church, Southsea. In 2018, he was appointed diocesan director of contextual training in the Diocese of Leicester, and also associate vicar (training and development) at Holy Trinity Church, Leicester, a resourcing church in the diocese. The following year, he left his diocesan position, having been appointed assistant director of St Mellitus College East Midlands on 1 August 2019. He was also a lecturer in theology for the theological college. On 20 September 2024, he was awarded a Doctor of Philosophy (PhD) degree by thesis via the Lambeth degrees. By October 2026, he was acting director of St Mellitus College East Midlands.

On 23 October 2026, he was announced as the next Bishop of Jarrow, the suffragan bishop of the Diocese of Durham. He will be consecrated as a bishop on 8 December 2026 during a service at York Minster.

== Selected works ==
- Patel, Jitesh K. (2025). Charismatics and postmodernity: modernism, postmodernism, and premodernism in the Church of England's Charismatic movement. Eugene, OR: Pickwick Publications. ISBN 979-8385240289.
