= Frederick MacNutt =

British Anglican priest and author

The Very Reverend Frederick MacNutt MA

Provost of Leicester
- In office 1927–1938

Personal details
- Born: 24 September 1873
- Died: 17 July 1949 (aged 75)
- Spouse(s): 1) Hettie Sina (née Bullock); 2) Evelyn May (née Oliver)

Frederick Brodie MacNutt (26 September 1873 – 17 July 1949) was an Anglican priest and author in the first half of the 20th century.

Born in Brighton to Irish parents, MacNutt was educated at St Paul's School, London, and Trinity College, Cambridge. He earned an Athletics Blue whilst there.

He was ordained in 1898 and was a curate at Holy Trinity, Beckenham (1898-1901), and St James's Church, Piccadilly (1901-1902). After this he was curate-in-charge of Christ Church, Wimbledon (1902-1903), then vicar of St John’s, Cheltenham (1903-1907), and St Matthew’s, Surbiton (1907-1918). From 1909 to 1918 he was a canon of Southwark Cathedral. While at Surbiton, he served from 1915 to 1918 as a Temporary Chaplain to the Forces (TCF), including lecturing at the Chaplains School at St Omer. He accompanied the Archbishop of Canterbury on a visit to the Western Front, conducting a service with 1500 soldiers at which he ‘with a splendid voice, read a shortened service’. Macnutt had published several books by 1914 and edited The Church in the Furnace in 1917 in which 17 TCFs contributed essays critical of the Church of England and its leadership.

In 1918 he became the vicar of St Martin's, Leicester, and was appointed archdeacon of Leicester in 1920. He oversaw major works to the interior of the church. When St Martin's Church became a cathedral in 1927 he became its first provost, and resigned in 1938. He was chaplain to the king from 1931 until his death. From 1938 until his retirement in 1946 he was a residentiary canon of Canterbury Cathedral.

MacNutt was married twice, firstly to Hettie Sina Bullock (1973-1945) and shortly after her death to Evelyn May Oliver (1898-1981). He had two children by Hettie: Derrick Somerset (1902-1971) and Margaret Hester (1906-1939).

== Works ==
- The Reproach of War: Addresses Given in Southwark Cathedral (London: Robert Scott, 1911)
- Advent Certainties: The Throne, the Cross, and the Spirit (London: R. Scott, 1913)
- The Church in the Furnace: Essays by Seventeen Temporary Church of England Chaplains on Active Service in France and Flanders (London: Macmillan, 1917)
- Classics of the Inner Life (London: Hodder and Stoughton, 1924)
- The Early Diocese of Leicester (Leicester: W. H. Lead, 1926) (Booklet)
- A War Primer: Containing Prayers, Old and New, for public and private use in time of war (London: S.P.C.K., 1939)
- Four Freedoms: Atlantic and Christian (Leicester: W. Thomley and Son, 1943) (Booklet)
- The Prayer Manual: For Private Devotion or Public Use on Divers Occasions (London: A. R. Mowbray, 1951) (830 prayers; based on MacNutt's collection of 1,400 prayers)
- Prayers on the Passion: Compiled from all sources, Ancient, Medieval, and Modern (London: A. R. Mowbray; New York: Morehouse-Gorham, 1954)

== Notes ==
Church of England titles
Preceded by Inaugural appointment	Provost of Leicester; 1927– 1934	Succeeded by Herbert Arthur Jones
