= Peter Gilbert White =

English cathedral organist

Peter Gilbert White (21 January 1937 – 3 April 2007) was an English church and concert organist, most famous for serving as Leicester Cathedral's Director of Music from 1969 to 1994.

== Background ==
White was born on 21 January 1937 in Plymouth, Devon.

After serving as organ scholar at St John's College, Cambridge from 1956 to 1960 and graduation from the university, he was appointed as assistant organist of Chester Cathedral, succeeding Brian Runnett. He served as such until 1962; he was succeeded by Harold Hullah.

In 1969, he was appointed as organist and director of music (master of the choristers) at Leicester Cathedral following the resignation of George Charles Gray, until his own retirement in 1994. He was succeeded there by Jonathan Gregory.

White died on 3 April 2007.

Cultural offices
Preceded by George Charles Gray	Organist and Master of the Choristers of Leicester Cathedral; 1969-1994	Succeeded by Jonathan Gregory
