= Herbert Jones (priest) =

Herbert Arthur Jones

Provost of Leicester
- In office 1938–1954

Dean of Manchester
- In office 1954–1963

Herbert Arthur Jones was Dean of Manchester in the third quarter of the 20th century.

Born in 1882, the son of a joiner and carpenter, he was educated at Birmingham University. He was ordained in 1917 and began his career with curacies at St Paul's Church, Balsall Heath and St Agatha's Church, Sparkbrook. He was then Vicar of All Saints' Small Heath after that Provost of Leicester Cathedral before entering the Deanery. He died on 17 February 1969.

== Notes ==
Church of England titles
Preceded by Frederick Brodie MacNutt	Provost of Leicester; 1938– 1954	Succeeded by Mervyn Armstrong
Preceded by John Leonard Wilson	Dean of Manchester; 1954 – 1963	Succeeded by Alfred Jowett
