= John Quirk (bishop) =

British Anglican bishop (1849–1924)

John Nathaniel Quirk (1849 – 26 April 1924) was an Anglican bishop.

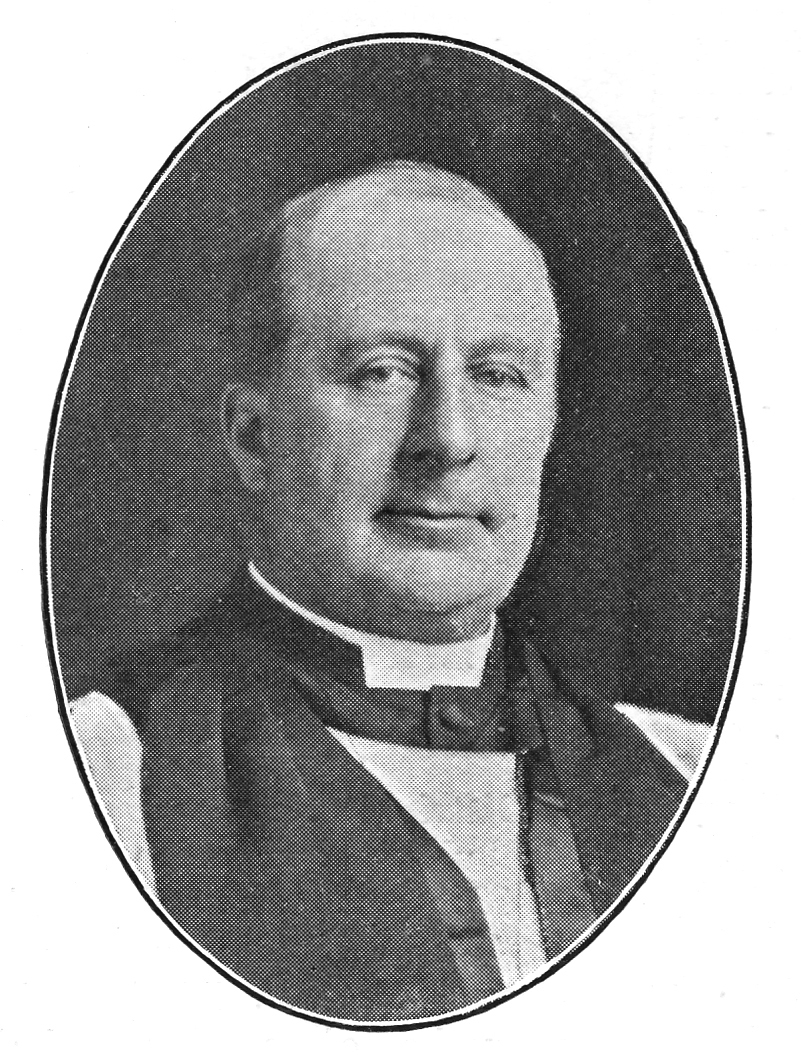
Photograph of Quirk which appeared in the 'Sheffield & District Who's Who' of 1905.

== Early life ==
Quirk was the son of Charles Thomas Quirk, sometime rector of Golborne. After being educated at Shrewsbury School and St John's College, Cambridge, he was ordained deacon in 1874 and priest in the following year.

== Ecclesiastical career ==
His first post was as a curate at St Leonard's, Bridgnorth, where he served for four years, after which he was at Doncaster. He was Vicar of St Thomas's, Douglas, for a year, then successively Vicar of Rotherham, of St Mary's, Beverley and of St Paul's, Lorrimore Square, before being appointed Canon of York in 1888. He was appointed Rector and Rural Dean of Bath in 1895, where he was heavily involved with the restoration of Bath Abbey. Quirk had recently been nominated Vicar Designate of Doncaster, when in September 1901 he became the first and (as it turned out) only Bishop of Sheffield to be a suffragan bishop in the Diocese of York. He was consecrated as a bishop in York Minster on 18 October 1901. In May 1902 he received the degree Doctor of Divinity (DD) from the University of Cambridge. In early 1903 he was appointed to an additional vicarage, that of St. Andrew′s, Sharrow.

When Sheffield was selected to form the centre of a new diocese in 1914, Quirk was translated to be the second Bishop of Jarrow (a suffragan bishop in the Diocese of Durham). He also served as Archdeacon of Durham from 1922 to 1924.

He was appointed Honorary Chaplain to the Yeomanry regiment the Yorkshire Dragoons on 28 May 1902.

He died on 26 April 1924.

== Family ==
Quirk was married, on 22 April 1880 at Brathay Church, Ambleside, to Mary Jane Clay (b. 17 August 1856 at Stapenhill, Burton-on-Trent; d. 21 August 1934 at Ulverstoke). She was the daughter of John Clay(1805–1877), a priest, of Burton-on-Trent, and his wife, Jessie Harden (1814–1908) of Ambleside. They had two sons and a daughter:

- Robert Quirk (1883–1949), m. Stella Sedgewick in 1908 and had children Roger, Diana and Catharine.
- Douglas Quirk (1887–1939), m. Inna Obolianoff in 1923, no children.
- Margery Quirk (1886–1911) d.unm.

Religious titles
Preceded by Inaugural appointment	Bishop of Sheffield; 1901–1914	Succeeded by Leonard Burrows
Preceded by George Nickson	Bishop of Jarrow; 1914–1924	Succeeded by Samuel Knight
