= Mike Hill (bishop) =

English Anglican bishop

The Right Reverend Mike Hill
- Bishop of Bristol
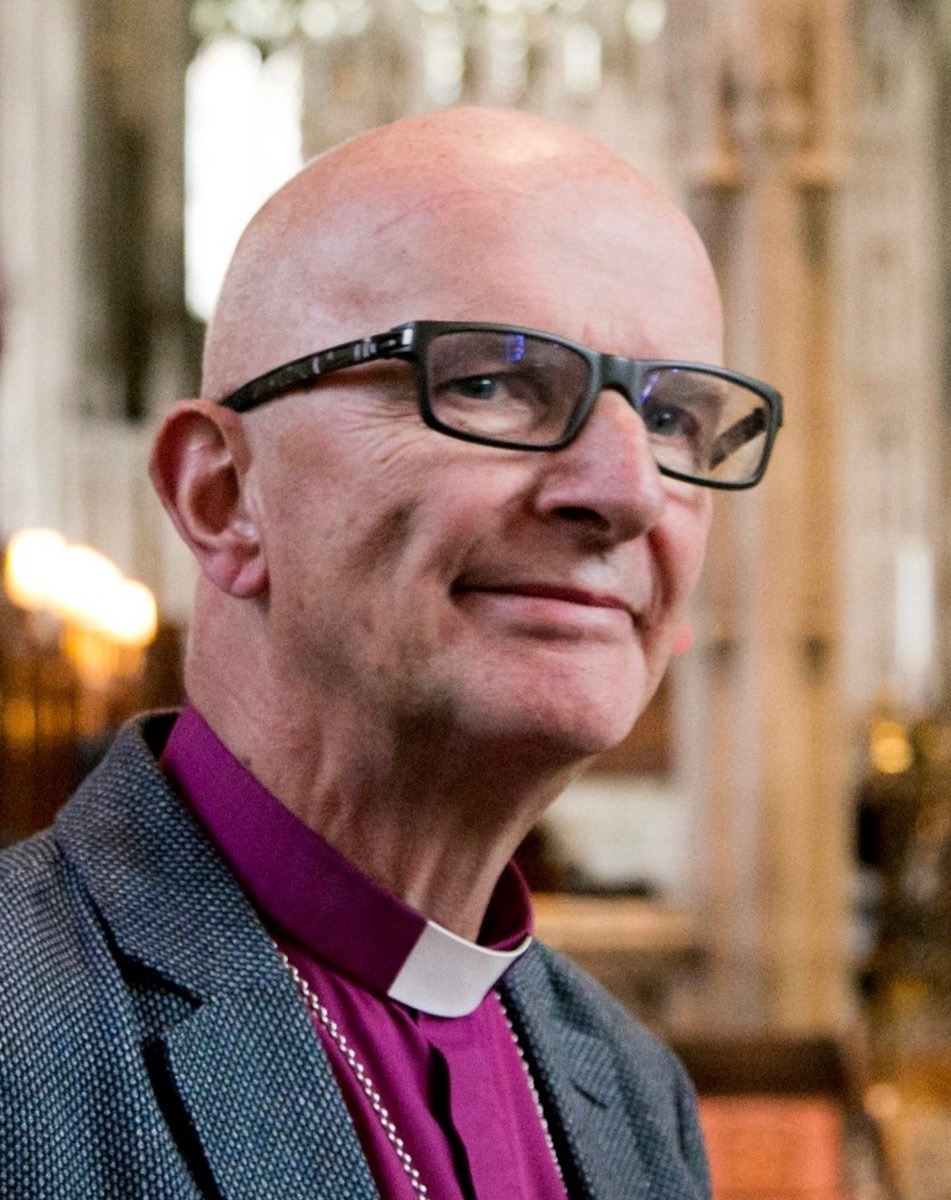
- Church: Church of England
- Diocese: Diocese of Bristol
- In office: 2003–2017
- Predecessor: Barry Rogerson
- Successor: Vivienne Faull
- Other post: Bishop of Buckingham (1998–2003)

Orders
- Ordination: 1977 (deacon); 1978 (priest) by Donald Coggan
- Consecration: 1998

Personal details
- Born: 17 April 1949 (age 77) Manchester, Lancashire, United Kingdom
- Denomination: Anglican
- Residence: Winterbourne, Bristol
- Parents: Arthur and Hilda Hill
- Spouse: Anthea (m. 1973)
- Children: Five
- Profession: formerly printing executive
- Education: Fitzwilliam College, Cambridge

Member of the House of Lords
- Lord Spiritual
- Bishop of Bristol; 16 July 2009 – 30 September 2017

Michael Arthur Hill (born 17 April 1949) is an English Anglican bishop. He was the Bishop of Bristol from 2003 until he retired effective in 2017. In addition to parish ministry, he had been the Archdeacon of Berkshire (1992–1998) and the Bishop of Buckingham (1998–2003).

== Early life and education ==
Hill was born on 17 April 1949, to Arthur and Hilda Hill. He was educated at Wilmslow County Grammar School, Fitzwilliam College, Cambridge and at Ridley Hall, Cambridge.

== Ordained ministry ==
He was ordained a deacon at Petertide 1977 (26 June) and a priest the next Petertide (2 July 1978), both times by Donald Coggan, Archbishop of Canterbury, at Canterbury Cathedral. From 1977 to 1980 he was curate of St Mary Magdalene's, Addiscombe; and, from 1980 to 1983, of St Paul's Slough. From 1983 to 1990 he was priest in charge of St Leonard's Chesham Bois. In 1990 he became Rural Dean of Amersham and the Archdeacon of Berkshire in 1992.

Hill was consecrated a bishop on 19 March 1998 at Southwark Cathedral. From 1998 to 2003, he was the Bishop of Buckingham, an area bishop in the Diocese of Oxford. He was then the Bishop of Bristol from 2003 until he retired effective 30 September 2017.

In December 2012, he became Chair of the Wycliffe Hall Council.

Hill withdrew from public ministry in June 2020 while the subject of a racism inquiry conducted by a Church of England tribunal. In January 2021, he was "formally rebuked" having admitted that he had used racial stereotypes in a letter of reference for a fellow clergyman.

== Styles ==
- The Reverend Mike Hill (1977–1992)
- The Venerable Mike Hill (1992–1998)
- The Right Reverend Mike Hill (1998–present)

Church of England titles
Preceded by Simon Burrows	Bishop of Buckingham; 1998–2003	Succeeded by Alan Wilson
Preceded by Barry Rogerson	Bishop of Bristol; 2003–2017	Succeeded by Vivienne Faull
