= John Ramsbotham =

The Right Reverend John Ramsbotham
- Bishop of Wakefield
- Church: Church of England
- Province: Province of York
- Diocese: Diocese of Wakefield
- In office: 1958–1967
- Predecessor: Roger Wilson
- Successor: Eric Treacy
- Other posts: Bishop of Jarrow, Diocese of Durham (1950–1958)

Orders
- Ordination: 1929 (deacon); 1930 (priest)
- Consecration: 1950

Personal details
- Born: John Alexander Ramsbotham; 25 February 1906
- Died: 16 December 1989 (aged 83)
- Denomination: Anglicanism
- Spouse: Eirian Morgan Owen (m. 1933–1988)
- Children: 5
- Education: Haileybury and Imperial Service College
- Alma mater: Corpus Christi College, Cambridge

John Alexander Ramsbotham (25 February 1906 – 16 December 1989) was an eminent Anglican clergyman during the middle third of the 20th century.

== Early life and education ==
Son of late Rev. Alexander Ramsbotham and of late (Margaret) Emily, née Cooke (m. 1896). Educated at Haileybury and Corpus Christi College, Cambridge.

== Ordained ministry ==
Ramsbotham was ordained in the Church of England as a deacon in 1929 and as a priest in 1930. His first post was as a curate at All Hallows Lombard Street, after which he became a chaplain to the Student Christian Movement. Appointed Vice Principal of Wells Theological College and then Warden of the College of the Ascension, Selly Oak, after a brief spell as Rector of Ordsall in the Diocese of Southwell, in 1942 he became Vicar of St George's, Jesmond before elevation to the episcopate as Bishop of Jarrow (and Archdeacon of Auckland) eight years later. When Michael Ramsey was translated to York from Durham, he recommended Ramsbotham for several Diocesan bishoprics, but with reservations. For Newcastle in 1956 he was concerned that Ramsbotham said inappropriate things because he was poorly prepared. For Guildford, he observed that Ramsbotham 'lives on his nerves'. He judged that Lincoln was too large a diocese for Ramsbotham. Finally, after being 'runner-up' to Donald Coggan for Bradford, Ramsbotham's appointment to Wakefield was approved by the Prime Minister, the key figure in episcopal appointments at that time. The note from the Prime Minister's patronage secretary to Prime Minister Harold Macmillan narrowed the choice to the rather austere Noel Kellaby, Provost of Newcastle, and the personable and popular Ramsbotham.

'It is a free choice between Kennaby and Ramsbotham. On the evidence I think that you ought to choose the Provost of Newcastle. But I cannot help hoping you will choose the Bishop of Jarrow'

Ramsbotham served in Wakefield for 9 years before poor health led to his retirement after many successful Diocesan initiatives. From 1968 to 1976 he was Assistant Bishop of Newcastle and died in 1989.

== Personal life ==
He married in 1933, Eirian Morgan Owen (d 1988); three sons (one of whom David Ramsbotham, Baron Ramsbotham) and two daughters.

Church of England titles
Preceded by David Colin Dunlop	Bishop of Jarrow; 1950 – 1958	Succeeded by Mervyn Armstrong
Preceded by Roger Plumpton Wilson	Bishop of Wakefield; 1958 – 1967	Succeeded by Eric Treacy
