= Jonathan Gregory =

Jonathan Gregory is the Director of Music of the UK-Japan Music Society and UK-Japan Choir, having previously been Director of Music at Leicester Cathedral from 1994 - 2010.

== Biography ==
Gregory was born in Leicester, where he was a chorister in the choir of Leicester Cathedral. He studied at the Royal Academy of Music, London before taking up the position of Organ Scholar at Clare College, Cambridge. In 1994, Leicester Cathedral appointed him as the Master of Music, having previously held the same position at St Anne's Cathedral, Belfast, St George's Church, Belfast, and also Church of St Mary the Great, Cambridge - the University church of Cambridge.

== Career ==
Throughout his career, Gregory has been a regular concert performer, giving performances in the UK of oratorios and orchestral music, including Bach's St Matthew Passion, St John Passion, Mass in B Minor, Christmas Oratorio, Elgar's Apostles, Handel's Messiah and Britten's War Requiem. He has also made regular recordings and broadcasts for organisations such as the BBC, and is a Fellow of the Royal College of Organists, an Associate of the Royal Academy of Music, and since 2008, and an examiner for the Associated Board of Royal Schools of Music.

In his role of an organist and harpsichordist, Gregory has given recitals throughout Britain, Europe and the Far East, including venues such as St John's College, Cambridge, Christ Church, Nara in Japan, and the Embassy of Japan in London. He has also performed with ensembles at Leicester's De Montfort Hall, playing with the London Mozart Players, Marylebone Camerata, Leicester Philharmonic Choir, and Philharmonia Orchestra, as well as giving occasional organ recitals there.

== Links with Japan, and the UK-Japan Music Society ==
He first took Leicester Cathedral Choir to Japan in 1998. In October 2005, the choir traveled there again as part of 2005 EU-Japan Year of People to People Exchanges. They visited Toyama, Kyoto, Nara, Yokohama and Tokyo, where 'Faure's Requiem' was performed with choirs from around Japan.

The visit, known as the "Friendship Music Visit to Japan", had the aim of strengthening links with Japanese Anglican churches, as well as introducing English Cathedral and church music to more of Japan. Although Gregory has since left his role as Director of Music at Leicester Cathedral, the close links between Leicester Cathedral and Japan still remain.

Gregory founded the UK-Japan Music Society and UK-Japan Choir in 1992. The choir rehearses and performs regularly in London, Cambridge, and Leicester, thus attracting singers from these areas. He conducted Bach's Christmas Oratorio and Beethoven's Ninth Symphony at Queen Elizabeth Hall, Handel's Messiah, Bach's Magnificat and other works at St John's Smith Square, London, and Monteverdi's Vespers at Leicester Cathedral.

Since 2003 the choir has held an annual Christmas Concert at London's St John's Wood Church - a performance which is regularly attended by the Japanese Ambassador and other ministers from the Embassy.

Cultural offices
Preceded by Harry Grindle	Director of Music, St Anne's Cathedral, Belfast; 1976–1984	Succeeded by Andrew Padmore
Preceded by Peter Gilbert White	Director of Music, Leicester Cathedral; 1994–2010	Succeeded by Christopher Ouvry-Johns
