= Gordon Archbold Slater =

English cathedral organist (1896–1979)

Gordon Archbold Slater O.B.E. D.Mus. FRCO (1896–1979) was an English cathedral organist, who served in Leicester Cathedral and Lincoln Cathedral.

Born in Harrogate, the son of a cabinet-maker, he was a composer of organ, piano and choral music.

== Hymn Tunes ==
Three hymn tunes appear in well-known and well-used books. 'St Botolph' is very widely sung to the words "Jesu the Very Thought of Thee" (or "To Mary, Mother of our God") 'Bilsdale' was sung by generations of children to the words "I love God's tiny creatures" whilst 'Fountains Abbey' with an 8.4.8.4.10.10. metre alternates between triple and duple time.

One of his pupils was Dennis Townhill, later organist of St Mary's Episcopal Cathedral, Edinburgh.

== Career ==
Slater was an organist of St Botolph's Church, Boston (1919–1927), Leicester Cathedral (1927–1931) and Lincoln Cathedral (1931–1966). He was appointed OBE in the 1974 New Year Honours.

Cultural offices
Preceded by George Herbert Gregory	Organist and Master of the Choristers of St Botolph's Church, Boston; 1919-1927	Succeeded by Joseph Bernard Jackson
Preceded by Charles Hancock	Organist and Master of the Choristers of Leicester Cathedral; 1927-1931	Succeeded by George Charles Gray
Preceded by George Bennett	Organist and Master of the Choristers of Lincoln Cathedral; 1931-1966	Succeeded by Philip Marshall
