= Alexander Hamilton (bishop) =

- Bishop of Jarrow
- Diocese: Diocese of Durham
- In office: 1965–1980
- Predecessor: Mervyn Armstrong
- Successor: Michael Ball
- Other posts: Honorary assistant bishop, Diocese of Bath and Wells (1988–2001)

Orders
- Ordination: 1939 (deacon); 1940 (priest)
- Consecration: 1965 by Donald Coggan

Personal details
- Born: 11 May 1915
- Died: 22 December 2001 (aged 86) Burnham-on-Sea, Somerset, United Kingdom
- Denomination: Anglican
- Parents: Cuthbert Arthur Hamilton and Agnes Maud Hamilton
- Spouse: unmarried
- Education: Trinity Hall, Cambridge

Alexander Kenneth Hamilton (11 May 1915 – 22 December 2001) was an eminent Anglican clergyman during the second half of the 20th century.

Educated at Malvern and Trinity Hall, Cambridge (he proceeded Cambridge Master of Arts {MA Cantab} in 1941), he trained for the ministry at Westcott House, Cambridge. He was ordained a deacon by John Willis, assistant bishop, at Holy Apostles, Leicester, on 8 October 1939; and a priest by Vernon Smith, Bishop of Leicester, at St Margaret's, Leicester, on 22 September 1940. His first post was as a Curate in Birstall, Leicestershire, after which he was a Chaplain in the RNVR. When peace returned he was Vicar of St Francis, Ashton Gate. Appointed Rural Dean of Central Newcastle in 1962, when Vicar of the Parish Church of St John the Baptist, Grainger Street, he became Bishop of Jarrow, a suffragan bishop in the Diocese of Durham, three years later. He was ordained (consecrated) a bishop by Donald Coggan, Archbishop of York, on St Matthias' day (24 February) 1965.

Religious titles
Preceded by Mervyn Armstrong	Bishop of Jarrow; 1965–1980	Succeeded by Michael Ball
