= Alan Warren (priest) =

Anglican priest and author (1932–2020)

The Very Reverend Alan Warren MA

Provost of Leicester Cathedral
- In office 1978–1992

Personal details
- Born: Alan Christopher Warren; 27 June 1932 (age 93) Sydenham, London, England
- Died: 22 December 2020
- Occupation: Priest, author

Alan Christopher Warren (27 June 1932 – 22 December 2020) was an Anglican priest and author, in the second half of the 20th century.

He was educated at Dulwich College and Corpus Christi College, Cambridge. He trained for ordination at Ridley Hall, Cambridge and was ordained deacon in 1957 and priest in 1958. During his time at Cambridge he was a choral scholar and was a violinist and violist in the Footlights and then in the Plymouth and Leicester Symphony orchestras. He later conducted several choirs and composed choral and chamber music. He was an M.C.C. cricketer and in 1968 he had brief appearances for the Leicestershire 2nd XI cricket club in the Second XI Championship, and played for Hunstanton and Leicestershire Golf Clubs. He began his career with curacies at St Paul's, Margate and St Andrew, Plymouth. After this he was Chaplain of Kelly College, Tavistock then Vicar of Holy Apostles, Leicester. From 1972 to 1978 he was a Canon of Coventry Cathedral and Coventry Diocesan Missioner when he became Provost of Leicester Cathedral, a post he held for 14 years, serving also on the General Synod of the Church of England and on the Cathedral Statutes Commission. In 1991 he succeeded the former England cricketer Trevor Bailey as President of the Alleyn Club.

After his retirement to West Norfolk in 1992 he preached widely and founded the Brancaster Music Festival in 2000. He died in 2020, aged 88.

== Notes ==
Church of England titles
Preceded by John Chester Hughes	Provost of Leicester Cathedral; 1978 – 1992	Succeeded by Derek Norman Hole
