= Karen Rooms =

British Anglican priest

The Very Reverend Karen Rooms
- Dean of Leicester
- Church: Church of England
- Diocese: Leicester
- In office: March 2024 – present
- Predecessor: David Monteith

Orders
- Ordination: 2006 (deacon); 2007 (priest)

Personal details
- Born: Karen Sheila Frances Rooms; 1 January 1961 (age 65) Edinburgh
- Denomination: Anglicanism
- Education: University of Bristol; St John's College, Nottingham

Karen Sheila Frances Rooms (born 1 January 1961) is a British Anglican priest. Since 2024, she has served as Dean of Leicester.

== Life and career ==
Rooms was born on 1 January 1961 in Edinburgh. She was educated at Nottingham Girls' High School and at the University of Bristol, where she graduated BA in 1982. She worked in sales and marketing with Procter and Gamble and in logistics with Boots. She then spent seven years living in northern Tanzania, where she worked with the Anglican Church of Tanzania and also established a café business in Moshi, Tanzania. Upon her return to the United Kingdom, she volunteered with Citizens Advice and trained for ordination at St John's College, Nottingham, and was ordained as a priest in 2007. She served as a curate in the parish of Hyson Green from 2006 to 2009, and then as vicar of St Ann's from 2009 to 2016, both in the city of Nottingham.

In 2016, she was appointed Canon Missioner at Leicester Cathedral, a position which she combined with parish ministry at St Andrew's Jarrom Street and at St Nicholas, Leicester. Her appointment as Dean of Leicester was announced on 1 December 2023. She was installed as Dean on 9 March 2024 by the Bishop of Leicester, Martyn Snow.

Church of England titles
Preceded by David Monteith	Dean of Leicester; 2024–	incumbent
