= Vivienne Faull =

British Anglican bishop and Lord Spiritual (born 1955)

The Right Reverend Vivienne Faull
- Bishop of Bristol
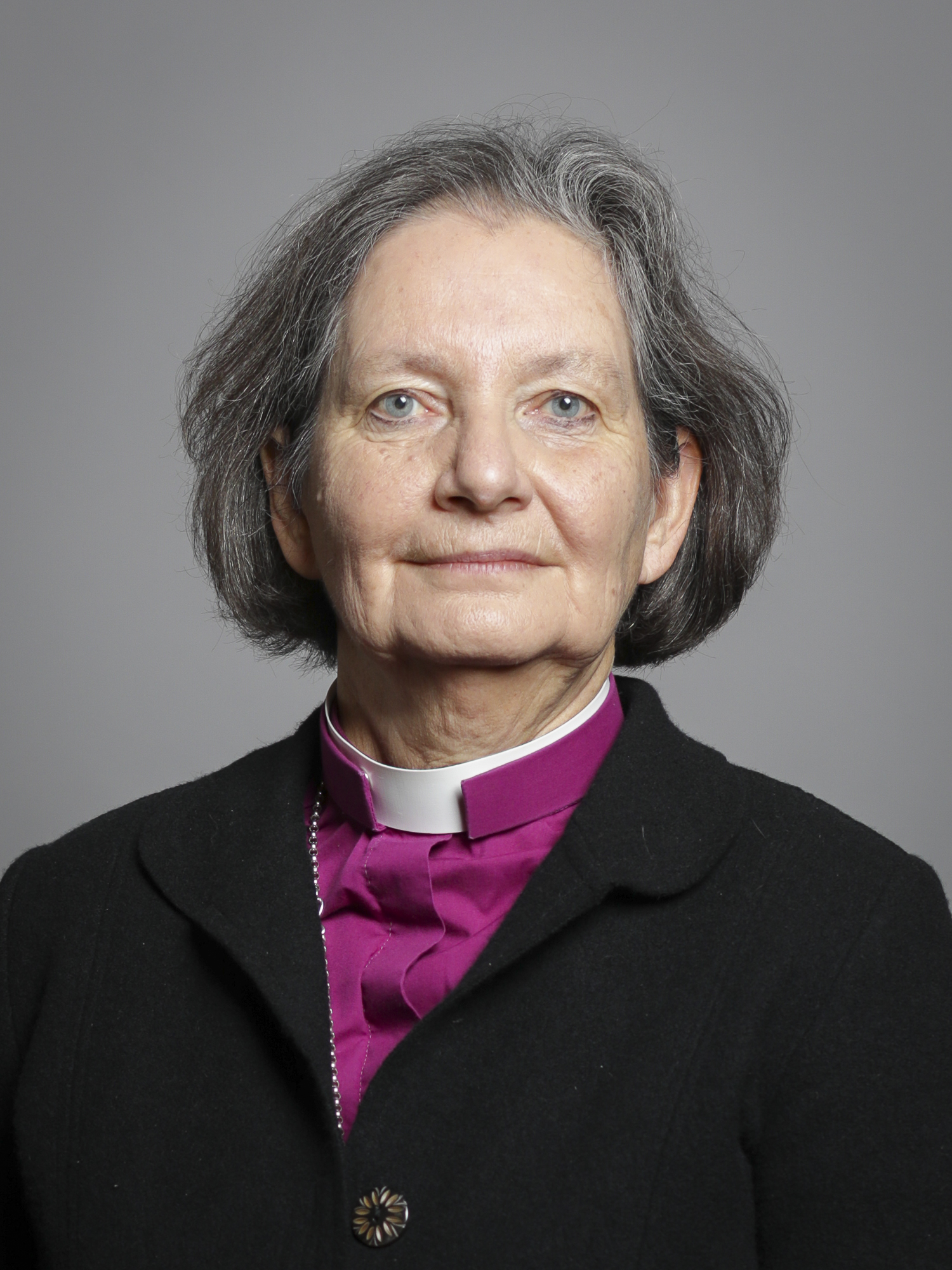
- Official portrait, 2019
- Church: Church of England
- Diocese: Diocese of Bristol
- In office: 2018 – 2025
- Predecessor: Mike Hill
- Other post: Lord Spiritual (2018–2025)
- Previous posts: Dean of York (2012–2018); Provost/Dean of Leicester (2000–2012)

Orders
- Ordination: 1987 (deacon); 1994 (priest)
- Consecration: 3 July 2018 by Justin Welby

Personal details
- Born: 20 May 1955 (age 71)
- Denomination: Anglican
- Education: St Hilda's College, Oxford; St John's College, Nottingham

Member of the House of Lords
- Lord Spiritual
- Bishop of Bristol; 23 October 2018 – 1 September 2025

Vivienne Frances Faull (born 20 May 1955) is a British retired Anglican bishop. From 2018 to 2025, she served as the Bishop of Bristol. In 1985, she was the first woman to be appointed chaplain to an Oxbridge college. She was later a cathedral dean, and the only female cathedral provost in Church of England history, having served as Provost of Leicester from 2000 to 2002.

== Early life ==
Faull was born on 20 May 1955. She was educated at The Queen's School, Chester, an all-girls private school. She studied at St Hilda's College, Oxford, and graduated in 1977 with a Bachelor of Arts (BA) degree; it was promoted to a Master of Arts (MA Oxon) in 1982. When she began studying theology at St John's College, Nottingham, she became the first woman to be paid by the Church of England to do so.

== Ordained ministry ==
Faull was licensed as a deaconess in the Church of England in 1982, and ordained as a deacon in 1987 and as a priest in 1994. She served first at the Church of St Matthew and St James, Mossley Hill, Liverpool, and then as Chaplain at Clare College, Cambridge. She was the first woman to become a chaplain of an Oxford or Cambridge University college. From 1990 to 1994, she was on the staff at Gloucester Cathedral. In 1994 she became Canon Pastor at Coventry Cathedral, later becoming Vice Provost, before moving to Leicester in 2000.

On 13 May 2000, she was installed as Provost of Leicester Cathedral – the first (and, due to the Cathedrals Measure 1999 redesignating all cathedral provosts as deans, only) female cathedral provost in Church of England history. In 2002, when her job title (but not the essential nature of the role) changed, she became the Dean of Leicester – and thus, with that change of title, the first female dean in the Church of England.

It was announced on 5 July 2012 that Faull was to become Dean of York in late 2012. She was duly installed at York Minster on 1 December.

=== Episcopal ministry ===
Faull was thought by many to be a leading candidate for the first woman appointed a bishop in the Church of England when canon law was altered in 2014 to allow female bishops, but the first woman to be made a bishop was Libby Lane. Faull eventually became the 18th female bishop in 2018.

On 15 May 2018, it was announced that Faull would be the next Bishop of Bristol, the diocesan bishop of the Diocese of Bristol, in succession to Mike Hill. She officially took up the appointment when she was elected and confirmed on 25 June 2018. On 3 July 2018, she was consecrated a bishop by Justin Welby, the Archbishop of Canterbury, during a service at St Paul's Cathedral, London. She was installed as the 56th Bishop of Bristol at Bristol Cathedral on 20 October 2018 and introduced as a Lord Spiritual at the House of Lords on 23 October.

On 6 February 2025, Faull announced her intention to retire in September. A farewell service was held on 30 August in Bristol Cathedral in which she laid down her crosier. She retired as Bishop of Bristol on 1 September.

=== Views ===
Faull's views have been described as "centrist to liberal" and as "open evangelical".

In 2014, she said that she supported the blessing of same-sex partnerships. In 2023, in reaction to the announcement that the Church of England was planning on introducing blessing for same-sex couples, she stated "I further support a change to the law that would allow for the marriage of same-sex couples in church, and regret that this proposal does not extend that legal change".

In 2023, she was one of 44 Church of England bishops who signed an open letter supporting the use of the Prayers of Love and Faith (i.e. blessings for same-sex couples) and called for "Guidance being issued without delay that includes the removal of all restrictions on clergy entering same-sex civil marriages, and on bishops ordaining and licensing such clergy".

== Controversies ==
In 2013 Faull was the target of hate mail during an unsuccessful campaign to have the remains of Richard III interred in York Minster. Protests against Faull's involvement in the decision to inter the remains in Leicester Cathedral continued, ultimately resulting in the prosecution of one protester, and an online petition calling for the removal of the dean.

In October 2016 Faull was instrumental in the sacking of all the York Minster bellringers with no notice on grounds of safeguarding, and the subsequent suspension of a carillonneur. Subsequent security measures were called 'uncharitable' and 'unChristian' in the press. The Archbishop, John Sentamu, decried the way that Faull had been "hounded" and said that she was one of the best deans he had ever worked with. The bell ringers had been dismissed following a claim of sexual assault against one of its members; although no conviction followed the cathedral chapter felt there was an ongoing risk. Several of the original bell ringers were recruited to the new team.

=== Minster School suspension incident (2018) ===
In May 2018, the Minster School, York, drew media attention when the headteacher, Alex Donaldson, and two senior staff were suspended due to the way air rifles were stored in a staff area. According to press reporting at the time, the headteacher Alex Donaldson and two members of the senior management team were escorted off the school premises following the discovery. The discovery led to an internal investigation by the Chapter of York, the school's governing body. In a letter to parents, Faull, who was then Dean of York and Chair of Governors, stated that "no child was at risk" and that the suspensions were a precautionary measure pending disciplinary proceedings.

The suspensions prompted protests by some parents, who demonstrated outside York Minster and called for the staff to be reinstated – Faull was criticised by some for her heavy-handed approach towards the matter. Two of the suspended staff were subsequently reinstated, while the headteacher remained barred from the school. Donaldson, who had worked at the school for several decades, formally stepped down from his position in November 2018. Prior to the May 2018 suspensions, it was reported that the headteacher, Alex Donaldson, had been asked to step down by the Chapter of York and had been offered a severance package, according to parents involved in the matter.

In June 2020, the Chapter of York announced that the Minster School would close at the end of the summer term, citing financial pressures exacerbated by reduced visitor income to York Minster during the COVID-19 pandemic. The closure ended more than six centuries of the school's operation – chorister pupils were given places at St Peter's School. Following the school’s closure in 2020, planning applications were submitted to convert the former Minster School building to commercial and community uses. The proposals included the change of use of the Grade II-listed former school to a restaurant (use class E) with a new kitchen, plant and service doors, the creation of level access and a platform lift, internal alterations and re-roofing, and the integration of solar photovoltaic panels on the roof. The plans also involved external repairs and landscaping improvements including public open space, cycle parking and associated amenities. Parts of the school were turned into office space for Minster staff.

== Personal life ==
In 1993, Faull married Michael Duddridge, a hospital doctor.

== Honours ==
In 2014, Faull was awarded an honorary Doctor of Philosophy (DPhil) degree by the University of Gloucestershire "for her outstanding contribution to the church and her work for the equality of women". On 20 March 2015, she was awarded an honorary Doctor of Letters (DLitt) degree by the University of Chester "in recognition of her outstanding contribution to Ministry in this country, in particular in recognition of her roles as Dean of Leicester and Dean of York". On 17 July 2015, she was awarded an honorary degree by the University of York.

== Styles ==
- Miss Vivienne Faull (1955–1987)
- The Revd Vivienne Faull (1987–1994)
- The Revd Canon Vivienne Faull (1994–2000)
- The Very Revd Vivienne Faull (2000–2018)
- The Rt Revd Vivienne Faull (2018–present)

Church of England titles
Preceded by Derek Hole	Provost of Leicester; 2000 – 2002	Succeeded by Herself as Dean
Preceded by Herself as Provost	Dean of Leicester; 2002 – 2012	Succeeded by David Monteith
Preceded by Keith Jones	Dean of York; 2012 – 2018	Succeeded by Jonathan Frost
Preceded by Mike Hill	Bishop of Bristol; 2018 – 2025	Succeeded by TBD
