= George Charles Gray =

English cathedral organist

George Charles Gray (1897–1981) was an English cathedral organist, who served in Leicester Cathedral.

== Background ==
Gray was born on 7 October 1897 in Nutfield. He was educated at Rotherham Grammar School. He saw military service in World War I. He was a pupil of Edward Bairstow at the same time as Gerald Finzi. In 1928 he gained a B Mus degree from Durham. He lectured at Leicester University (1931–1946) and at the Leicester College of Education (1945–1976). He was awarded an honorary M Mus degree by Leicester University in 1968 and a Lambeth D Mus degree in 1969.

At Leicester, one of his pupils was Stanley Vann, later organist of Peterborough Cathedral.

Other pupils of his included Harold Dexter and Jonathan Gregory, the latter becoming cathedral organist at St Anne's cathedral, Belfast.

He died at Leicester on 24 March 1981.

== Career ==
Organist of:

- St Michael le Belfrey, York (1920–1922)
- St. Martin's Church, Leeds (1922–1923)
- Alnwick Parish Church (1923–1926)
- St. Mary le Tower, Ipswich (1926–1930)
- Leicester Cathedral (1931–1969)

Cultural offices
Preceded by Gordon Archbold Slater	Organist and Master of the Choristers of Leicester Cathedral; 1931–1969	Succeeded by Peter Gilbert White
