= Derek Hole =

Provost of Leicester Cathedral (1933–2021)

Derek Norman Hole (5 December 1933 – 4 September 2021) was a Church of England priest who spent most of his long career living and ministering in Leicestershire.

Born on 5 December 1933 in Cornwall, he was educated at Public Central School, Plymouth and prepared for ordination at Lincoln Theological College. He began his career as Curate at St Mary Magdalen, Knighton, Leicester after which he was Domestic Chaplain to the Archbishop of Cape Town.

After a further curacy at St Nicholas Church, Kenilworth he was Rector of St Mary the Virgin, Burton Latimer. From 1973 to 1992 he was Vicar of St James the Greater, Leicester when he became Provost of Leicester Cathedral - a post he held for 7 years. He was also appointed chaplain to Queen Elizabeth II.

He was actively involved in the Leicestershire community until a few months before his death, and was approved to officiate by the Bishop until 2020. He died on 4 September 2021, at the age of 87 with a Requiem Mass and funeral service at St James the Greater.

== Notes ==
Church of England titles
Preceded by Alan Christopher Warren	Provost of Leicester Cathedral; 1992– 1999	Succeeded by Vivienne Frances Faull
