= Mervyn Armstrong =

Anglican clergyman (1906–1984)

Armstrong in 1958.

Mervyn Armstrong, OBE (1906–1984) was an eminent Anglican clergyman during the middle third of the 20th century.

Educated at Balliol College, Oxford, he was awarded an Aeogrotat degree in Philosophy, Politics and Economics ('PPE') in 1928. Ordained in 1938, his first post was as a Chaplain in the RNVR, after which he was Vicar of Margate. Appointed Chaplain to the Archbishop of Canterbury in 1949 he became Archdeacon of Stow and then Provost of Leicester Cathedral before appointment to the episcopate as Bishop of Jarrow in 1958. In 1964, he resigned that See to become an "advisor on industry" to Donald Coggan, Archbishop of York, and an Assistant Bishop of York; he retired in 1970.

Church of England titles
Preceded by Arthur Ivan Greaves	Archdeacon of Stow; 1951 – 1954	Succeeded by Lawrence Ashcroft
Preceded by Herbert Arthur Jones	Provost of Leicester Cathedral; 1954 – 1958	Succeeded by Richard John Forrester Mayston
Preceded by John Alexander Ramsbotham	Bishop of Jarrow; 1958 – 1965	Succeeded by Alexander Kenneth Hamilton
