= John Hughes (priest, 1924–2008) =

British Anglican priest

The Very Reverend John Hughes ChStJ
- Provost of Leicester Cathedral
- Church: Church of England
- Diocese: Diocese of Leicester
- In office: 1963–1978
- Predecessor: Richard Mayston
- Successor: Alan Warren

Orders
- Ordination: 1950 (deacon); 1951 (priest)

Personal details
- Born: John Chester Hughes; 20 February 1924
- Died: 16 October 2008 (aged 84)
- Denomination: Anglicanism
- Education: Dulwich College; Durham University

John Chester Hughes, ChStJ (20 February 1924 – 16 October 2008) was an Anglican priest in the second half of the 20th century.

== Early life and education ==
Hughes was born on 20 February 1924, educated at Dulwich College and Durham University.

== Ordained ministry ==
Hughes was ordained in 1950. He began his career with a curacy at St Alban, Westcliff-on-Sea after which he was Succentor at Chelmsford Cathedral. He then held incumbencies at St Barnabas, Leicester and St St John the Baptist, Croxton Kerrial. In 1963 he became Provost of Leicester Cathedral, a post he held for 15 years. His last post before retirement in 1987 was as Vicar of St Nicholas, Bringhurst.

He died on 16 October 2008.

== Honours ==
In November 1974, Hughes was appointed a Chaplain of the Order of St John (ChStJ).

Church of England titles
Preceded by Richard John Forrester Mayston	Provost of Leicester Cathedral; 1963–1978	Succeeded by Alan Christopher Warren
