= Richard Mayston =

Irish Anglican priest (1907-1963)

Richard John Forrester Mayston CBE

Provost of Leicester Cathedral
- In office 1958–1963

Richard John Forrester Mayston CBE was an Anglican priest.

He was born in Dublin on 23 January 1907, educated at Trinity College, Dublin and ordained in 1931. He began his career as a curate in Holywood, County Down. Commissioned into the Royal Army Chaplains' Department, he served until 1958. He then became Provost of Leicester Cathedral, a post he held until his death on 13 May 1963.

== Notes ==
Church of England titles
| Preceded by Mervyn Armstrong | Provost of Leicester Cathedral; 1958– 1963 | Succeeded by John Chester Hughes |
