= Charles Hancock (organist) =

English organist & composer (1852–1927)

Charles Hancock FRCO (4 January 1852 – 6 February 1927) was an organist and composer based in England.

== Life ==
His early musical education was as a chorister in the choir of St George's Chapel, Windsor. He was awarded his FRCO in 1872 and graduated from Oxford University in 1874.

In Leicester he was the conductor of the Leicester New Musical Society.

He died on 6 February 1927, a few weeks before the church was upgraded to cathedral status.

== Appointments ==
- Organist of St. Mary's Church, Datchet, Windsor
- Organist of St. Andrew's Church, Uxbridge
- Assistant organist of St George's Chapel, Windsor
- Organist of St. Martin's Church, Leicester 1875 - 1927

== Compositions ==
He composed works for choir and organ.

Cultural offices
Preceded by John Morland	Organist of St. Martin's Church, Leicester; 1875 - 1927	Succeeded by Gordon Archbold Slater
