= David Monteith =

Northern Irish Anglican priest

The Very Reverend David Monteith
- Dean of Canterbury
- Church: Church of England
- Diocese: Diocese of Canterbury
- In office: 2022 – present
- Predecessor: Robert Willis
- Other post: Dean of Leicester (2013-2022)

Orders
- Ordination: 1993 (deacon); 1994 (priest)

Personal details
- Born: David Robert Malvern Monteith; 5 June 1968 (age 58) Enniskillen, Northern Ireland
- Denomination: Anglicanism
- Partner: David Hamilton
- Education: Portora Royal School
- Alma mater: St John's College, Durham; St John's College, Nottingham; University of Nottingham

David Robert Malvern Monteith (born 5 June 1968) is a Northern Irish Anglican priest in the Church of England and is the current Dean of Canterbury, the senior canon of Canterbury Cathedral. He was previously the Dean of Leicester since his appointment in May 2013 until 2022.

== Early life and education ==
Monteith is the son of Malvern and Molly Monteith, the eldest of two boys and two girls. He was born on 5 June 1968 in Enniskillen, Northern Ireland. He was educated at Portora Royal School, a grammar school in Enniskillen. He studied zoology at the University of Durham, where he was a member of St John's College, and he graduated with a Bachelor of Science (BSc) degree in 1989.

In 1990, Monteith entered St John's College, Nottingham, an Anglican theological college, to train for ordained ministry. During this time, he also studied theology at the University of Nottingham, and graduated with a Bachelor of Theology (BTh) degree in 1992. He then studied for a Master of Arts (MA) degree in mission and ministry, completing it in 1993.

== Ordained ministry ==
Monteith was ordained in the Church of England as a deacon in 1993 and as a priest in 1994. From 1993 to 1997, he served his curacy at All Saints' Church, Kings Heath in the Diocese of Birmingham. He then joined the staff of St Martin-in-the-Fields, City of Westminster in the Diocese of London, where he was an assistant curate from 1997 to 2000 and an associate vicar from 2000 to 2002.

In 2002, Monteith moved to the Diocese of Southwark to become Priest-in-Charge of Holy Trinity Church, Wimbledon. He was also Area Dean of Merton between 2004 and 2009. In 2009, there was a reorganisation of parishes in the area, and Holy Trinity joined with two other churches to form the Parish of Merton Priory. Monteith served for a short time as the parish's team rector.

In 2009, Monteith moved to Leicester Cathedral, where he served as canon chancellor from 2009 to 2013. On 18 May 2013, he was installed as dean of the cathedral, and as such he was the most senior priest in the Diocese of Leicester.

On 11 October 2022, it was announced that the late Queen Elizabeth II had approved Monteith's nomination for election as Dean of Canterbury, and he was appointed by her successor King Charles III on 7 November 2022; his institution took place on 17 December 2022.

He serves on the Executive Board of the Association of English Cathedrals.

His appointment was criticised by the Global South Fellowship of Anglican Churches (GSFA) and the Global Fellowship of Confessing Anglicans (GAFCON), on the grounds that Monteith is in a same-sex civil partnership; the Church of England defended his appointment, stating that Monteith lives chastely with his partner.

== Personal life ==
In 2008, Monteith entered into a civil partnership with David Hamilton. In a short church biography, Monteith "shares his life in a Civil Partnership with David Hamilton."

Church of England titles
Preceded by Viv Faull	Dean of Leicester; 2013–2022	Succeeded by Karen Rooms
Preceded by Robert Willis	Dean of Canterbury; 2022–present	Incumbent
