= Bishop of Jarrow =

Suffragan bishop in the Church of England

The Bishop of Jarrow is an episcopal title used by a suffragan bishop of the Church of England Diocese of Durham, in the Province of York, England. The title takes its name after the former Anglo Saxon monastery (Monkwearmouth–Jarrow Abbey) in the town of Jarrow in Tyne and Wear.

== List of bishops ==
Bishops of Jarrow
From	Until	Incumbent	Notes
1906	1914	George Nickson	Translated to Bristol
1914	1924	John Quirk	(1849–1924). Formerly Suffragan Bishop of Sheffield
1924	1932	Samuel Knight	(1868–1932).
1932	1939	James Gordon	
1939	1944	Leslie Owen	Translated to Maidstone
1944	1950	Colin Dunlop	Previously Prior and Precentor of St Mary's Cathedral, Edinburgh
1950	1958	John Ramsbotham	Translated to Wakefield
1958	1965	Mervyn Armstrong	
1965	1980	Alexander Hamilton	
1980	1990	Michael Ball	(b. 1932). Translated to Truro
1990	2002	Alan Smithson	
2002	2007	John Pritchard	(b. 1948). Translated to Oxford
2007	2018	Mark Bryant	(b. 1949) Retired on 8 October 2018.
2019	2026	Sarah Clark	(b. 1965) Consecrated on 27 February 2019; acting diocesan bishop, 2024–present; translated to Ely in 2026.
2026		Jitesh Patel	(b. 1982) Announced 23 October 2026
