= Cultural depictions of Richard III of England =

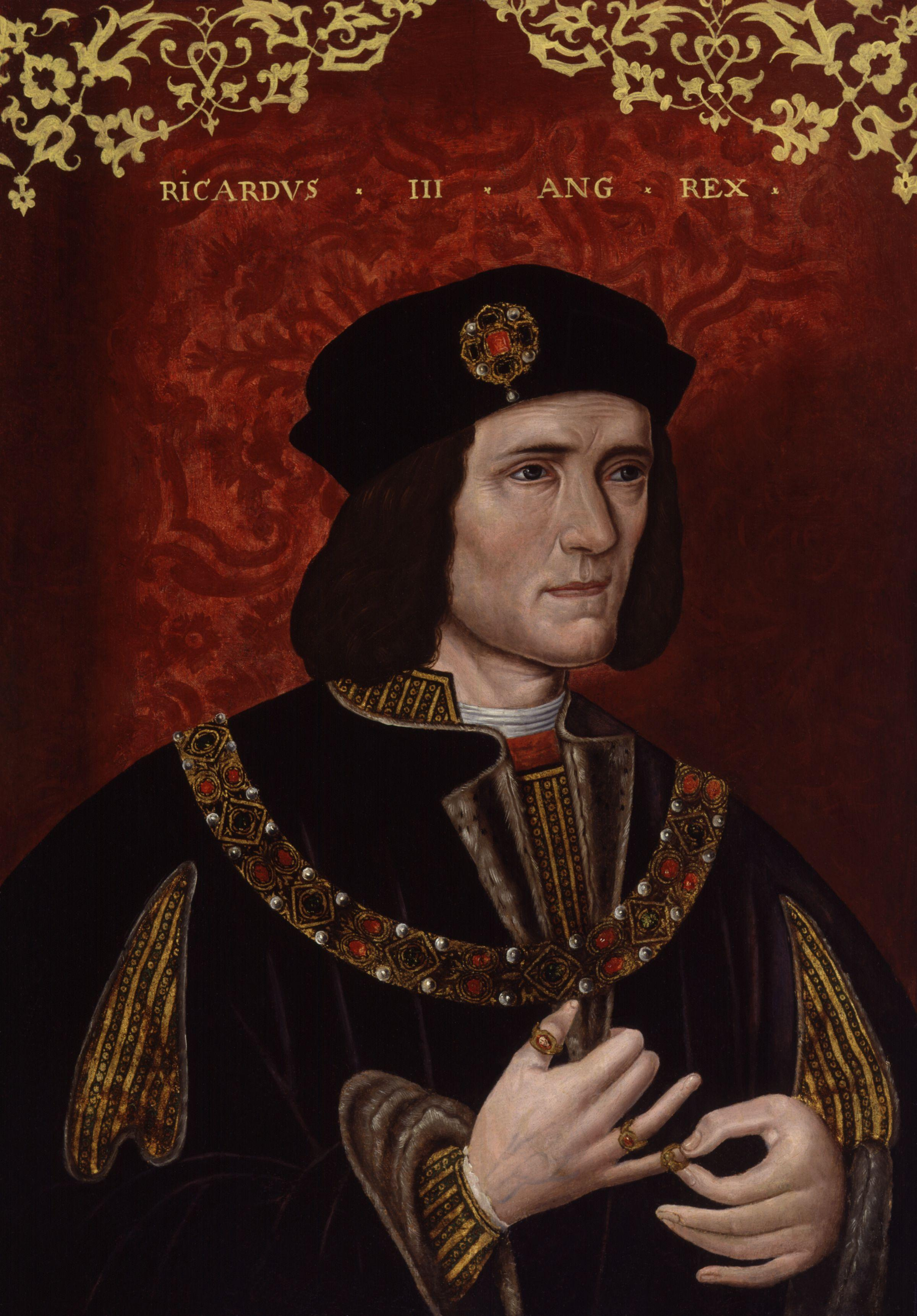
Late 16C portrait of Richard III (National Portrait Gallery, London), copied from an early 16C one in the Royal Collections. This version features in Josephine Tey's novel The Daughter of Time.

Richard III of England has been depicted in literature and popular culture many times. In the Tudor period he was invariably portrayed as a villain, most famously in Shakespeare's play Richard III, but also in other literature of the period. Richard's life was not much depicted again until the 20th century when the "Ricardian" movement sought to restore his reputation. Much of more recent creative literature has portrayed him in a positive light. However his reputation as a hunchbacked villain has remained a familiar historical cliché within popular culture.

== Literature ==
=== Tudor period ===
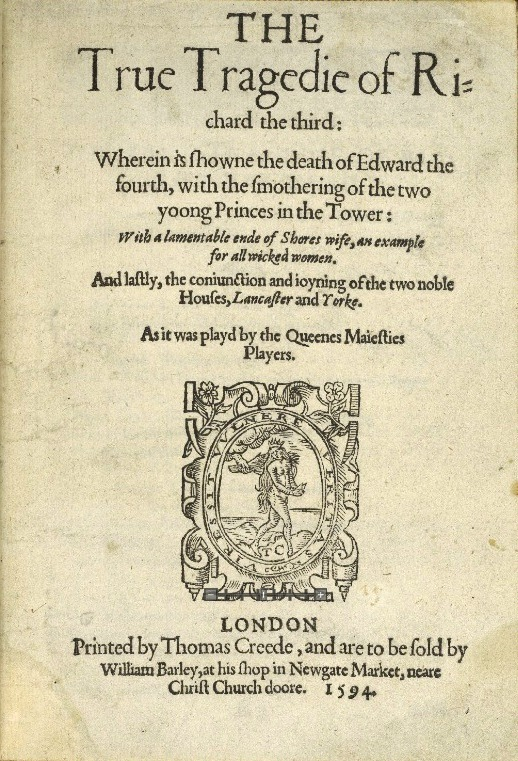
Cover of the 1594 quarto of The True Tragedy of Richard III, which was "printed by Thomas Creede and ... to be sold by William Barley, at his shop in Newgate Market".

The foremost work of literature featuring Richard III is William Shakespeare's Richard III, which is believed to have been written in 1591, a century after the King's death. It was the final part of a tetralogy of plays about the Wars of the Roses. Richard also appears in the two plays preceding it, Henry VI, Part 2 and Henry VI, Part 3. Shakespeare depicts Richard as a deformed and malevolent individual who takes out his bitterness over his own twisted body on the world, serving only his own ambition. His self-serving amorality is the culmination of the social and moral chaos caused by power struggles between the great magnates of the era. In Henry VI part 3 (Act III, Scene 2, lines 1645–50) Richard describes himself as follows:

Why, love forswore me in my mother's womb:

And, for I should not deal in her soft laws,
She did corrupt frail nature with some bribe,
To shrink mine arm up like a wither'd shrub;
To make an envious mountain on my back,
Where sits deformity to mock my body;

To shape my legs of an unequal size.

Two other plays of the Elizabethan era predated Shakespeare's work. The Latin-language drama Richardus Tertius (1579) by Thomas Legge is believed to be the first history play written in England. The anonymous play The True Tragedy of Richard III (c.1590), performed in the same decade as Shakespeare's work, was probably an influence on Shakespeare. Neither of the two plays places any emphasis on Richard's physical appearance, though the True Tragedy briefly mentions that he is "A man ill shaped, crooked backed, lame armed" adding that he is "valiantly minded, but tyrannous in authority." Both portray him as a man motivated by personal ambition, who uses everyone around him to get his way.

In 1602, in the last days of Tudor England, Ben Jonson wrote a play about Richard entitled Richard Crookback. His portrayal of the king is unknown, as it was never published. However, it is unlikely to have departed from the negative portrayal of Richard, and probably followed the same pattern as Jonson's only other tragedies, written at the same period, Catiline His Conspiracy and Sejanus His Fall, both of which are about ruthless usurpers who finally receive just retribution.

Several ballads about the Battle of Bosworth Field (1485) also survive from this period, some of which may date back to the immediate aftermath of the battle.

=== 18th century ===
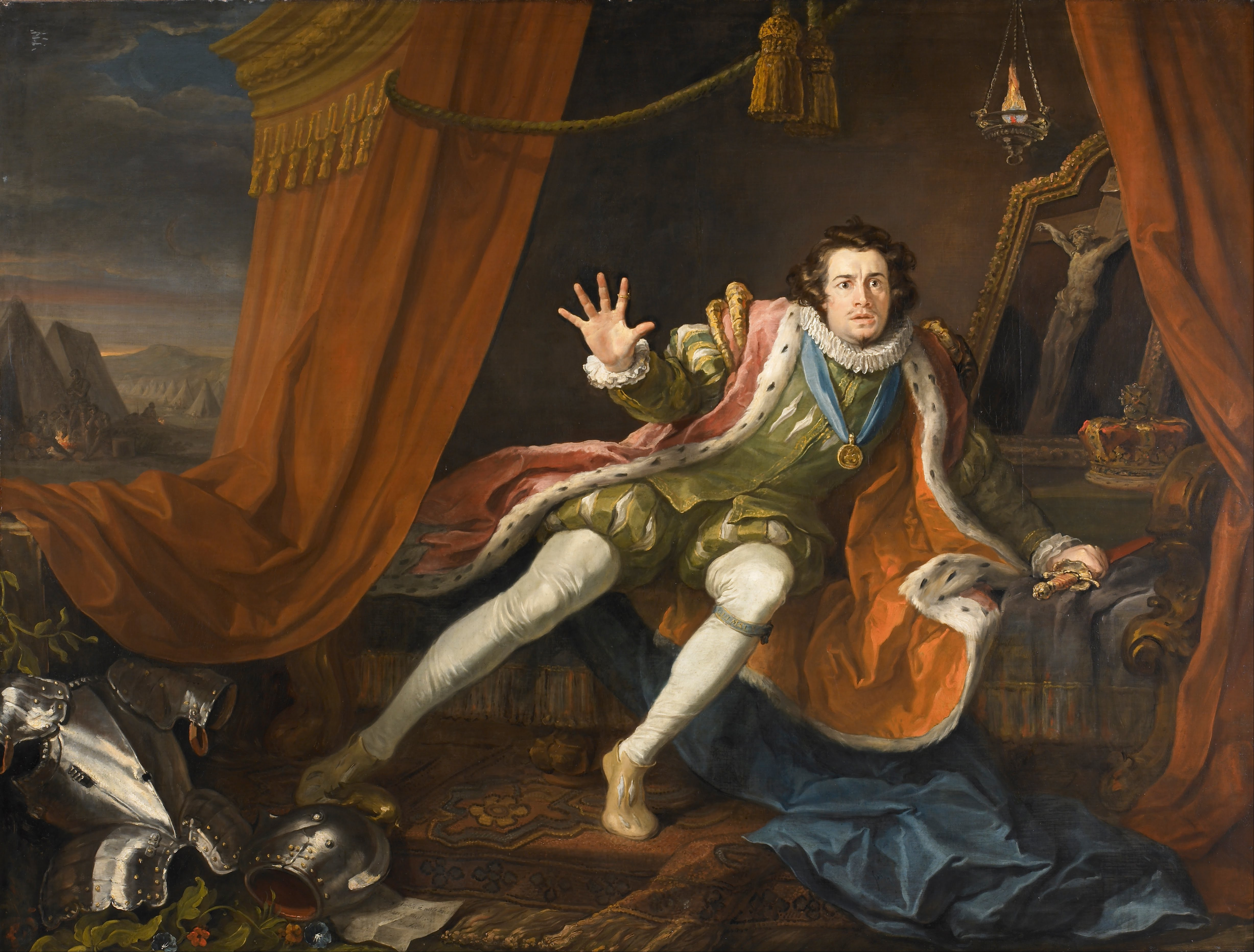
Garrick as Richard III (1745) by William Hogarth. The scene is Shakespeare's Richard III Act V, Sc. 3. David Garrick plays Richard III just before the Battle of Bosworth, his sleep having been haunted by the ghosts of those he has murdered. He wakes to the realization that he is alone in the world and death is imminent.

- Richard is one of the central characters in Nicholas Rowe's 1714 play The Tragedy of Jane Shore; he is portrayed as a tyrant, similar to Shakespeare's Richard.
- Richard Plantagenet a legendary tale, a poem by Thomas Hull was published in 1774. It is written in the first person, spoken by Richard Plantagenet, the king's illegitimate son. The boy grows up in ignorance of his parentage. He meets his father just before the Battle of Bosworth. His father proposes to acknowledge him and raise him to royalty after the battle, but he tells him to keep his parentage secret if the battle is lost. With the king's defeat, Richard spends the rest of his life as a lowly workman.

=== 19th century ===
- In Edward Bulwer-Lytton's novel The Last of the Barons (1843) Richard, as Duke of Gloucester, features prominently.
- In Robert Louis Stevenson's The Black Arrow: A Tale of the Two Roses the young Richard of Gloucester is a significant secondary character, as "Richard Crookback".
- In Mark Twain's A (Burlesque) Autobiography he writes: "I was born without teeth — and there Richard III had the advantage of me; but I was born without a humpback, likewise, and there I had the advantage of him."

=== 20th century ===
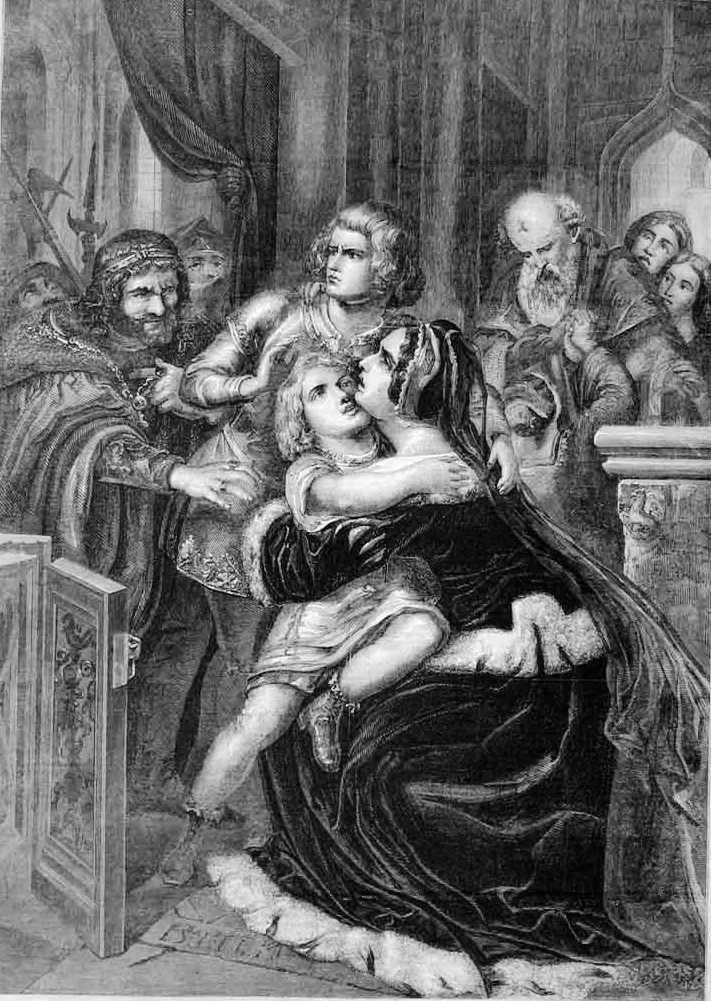
The villainous image of Richard III. An 1860 portrayal of Richard (left) taking Richard, Duke of York from his mother's arms in church sanctuary

- Dickon is a 1929 novel by Marjorie Bowen about King Richard III of England, giving a sympathetic portrayal of Richard.
- Josephine Tey's The Daughter of Time (1951) puts Clements Markham's theories regarding the Princes in the Tower, from his Richard III: his life and character (1906), into the form of a modern detective novel. While in hospital, an injured police detective devotes his spare time to an investigation of the murder of the Princes, supposedly committed or commissioned by Richard III. He concludes that Richard was innocent and that the most likely culprit was Henry VII. Writing as Gordon Daviot, she also wrote a play, Dickon (produced 1955), based more closely on the historical Richard, and again sympathetic in its treatment.
- Counterfactual treatments of what would have happened had Richard III won the Battle of Bosworth and killed Richmond instead are rare within the alternate history subgenre of science fiction. One rare exception is Andre Norton's The Crossroads of Time (1956/1962), in which Ferdinand and Isabella also fail to subdue Granada. Thus, John Cabot discovers America (or Cabotland, as it is called here), amidst other historical alterations. While Richard III plays a minor role, Norton's sympathies seem Ricardian in this context.
- Rosemary Hawley Jarman's novel We Speak No Treason (1971) is another account from the Ricardian viewpoint, told through three courtiers.
- John Crowley's novel The Deep features a fictionalized version of Richard named Sennred, who is portrayed as a hero.
- Elizabeth Peters's novel The Murders of Richard III (1974) is set in a modern country house filled with Ricardians re-enacting the events of 1483–5. A series of pranks escalating to crimes occur during the re-enactments.
- Rhoda Edwards wrote two historical novels examining Richard's youth up to his betrothal to Anne Neville, Fortune's Wheel (1979), and his reign as king up to his death, Some Touch of Pity (1977) (published in the US as The Broken Sword).
- Dickon by Jack Pulman (1979) is a play premiered by the John Lewis Partnership Dramatic Society, directed by Michael Deacon, and starring Alan Patient as Richard III.
- Richard III features as a character in The Founding (1980), Volume 1 of The Morland Dynasty, a series of historical novels by Cynthia Harrod-Eagles. This volume is set against the background of the Wars of the Roses.
- Sharon Kay Penman's historical novel The Sunne in Splendour (1982) gives a comprehensive account of the Wars of the Roses. However, the author has made additions and minor adjustments to enrich the story.
- John M. Ford wrote a counterfactual fantasy treatment of Richard III's rise to power, The Dragon Waiting (1986), albeit one set in an alternate universe where Julian the Apostate reigned as Roman Emperor for longer than in our history and was successful in reinstating Roman polytheism as a consequence. Magic also works in this alternate universe. At its end, Richard III wins the Battle of Bosworth and kills Richmond.
- In the Jonny Quest comic, #10, March 1987: "Winters of Discontent", Jonny and Hadji are accidentally sucked back in time and meet Richard III, only to find the princes are not locked in the tower (they adore their uncle), that Richard, not deformed, is loved by the people, and that there is a plot by Henry to usurp Richard and launch a smear campaign to legitimize his own claim to the throne. The theme is that history is written by the winners and that the truth will out.
- Kate Sedley's "Roger the Chapman" series (1991 - 2013) features a pedlar who solves murders and is often employed by Richard III.

=== 21st century ===
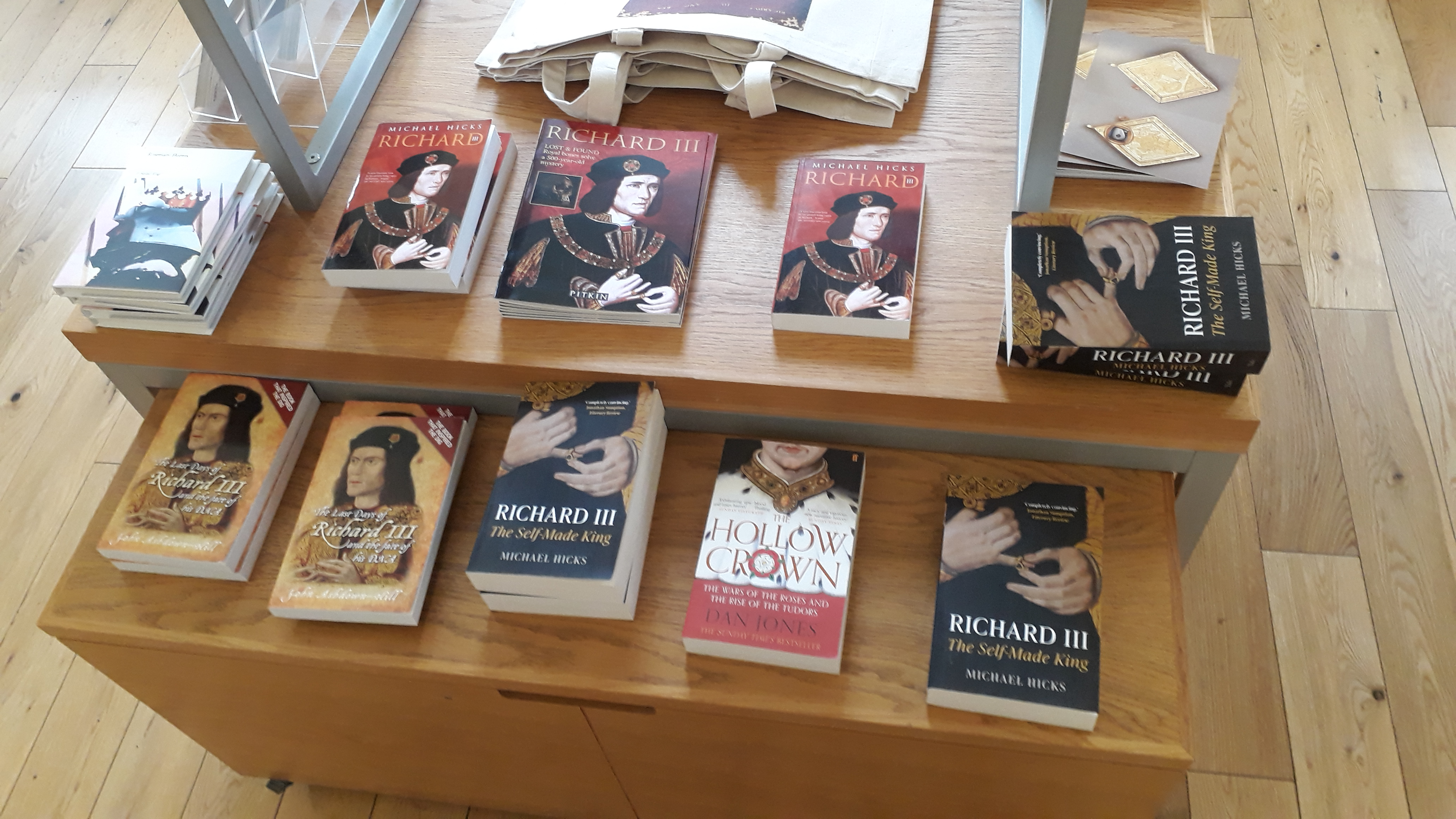
Richard III book display

- Reay Tannahill's The Seventh Son (2001) is a sympathetic but unromanticized treatment of Richard III.
- Sandra Worth's trilogy "The Rose of York" includes three titles: Love and War (2003), Crown of Destiny (2006) and Fall from Grace (2007).
- Anne Easter Smith's A Rose for the Crown (2006) is a romantic novel centred upon Katherine Haute, who has been suggested as the mother of at least one of Richard's illegitimate children.
- In Jasper Fforde's Thursday Next series, the Shakespeare play is treated in the same way as The Rocky Horror Show, with regular audiences dressing up as characters from the play, stepping in to take part in it, and regular, evolutionary audience participation.
- Posie Graeme-Evans's trilogy about the later Plantagenet kings features a young Richard III.
- In Margaret Peterson Haddix's 2009 young-adult novel Sent, volume two of her The Missing novel series about a time-traveling illegal adoption ring involving abducted young historical figures, two of the main characters, Chip and Alex, turn out to be Edward V and Richard of Shrewsbury, respectively. They dodge an assassination attempt by Richard III, who believed that it was necessary for them to die for the good of England, and nevertheless was wracked by guilt about it throughout his reign.
- Philippa Gregory's novel The White Queen (2009) never fully acquits Richard of the young princes' murder/disappearance, but implies that Henry Tudor's mother, Margaret Beaufort, is involved, with the intention of incriminating Richard; however, Prince Richard is saved by being secretly sent abroad. Her novels The Red Queen and The White Princess confirm the suggestions made in the earlier book.
- Moonyeen Blakey's novel The Assassin's Wife implicates Richard in the murder of the princes.
- In Requiem of the Rose King, a manga series begun in 2013 by Aya Kanno and loosely based on Shakespeare's plays, Richard is portrayed as being intersex rather than hunchbacked.
- Jason Charles's The Claws of Time (2017) is a historical fantasy novel which depicts the relationship between Richard III and his fictional mistress Dimiza/River.

== Screen adaptations ==
Perhaps the best-known film adaptation of Shakespeare's play Richard III is the 1955 version directed and produced by Sir Laurence Olivier, who also played the lead role. Also notable are the 1995 film version starring Sir Ian McKellen, set in a fictional 1930s fascist England, and Looking for Richard, a 1996 documentary film directed by Al Pacino, who plays the title character as well as himself. In the 1960 BBC series based on Shakespeare's history plays, An Age of Kings, Paul Daneman played Richard. Ron Cook played Richard III in the 1983 BBC Shakespeare production of the play. Away from the Shakespearean tradition, Aneurin Barnard played Richard in the 2013 BBC-Starz joint production TV series The White Queen based on Philippa Gregory’s novels, and in September 2014 BBC started filming a new TV version of the Shakespearean play for the second part of The Hollow Crown with Benedict Cumberbatch in the title role.

Richard's career is the subject of the 1939 film Tower of London, in which he is played by Basil Rathbone. The film was later remade by Roger Corman in 1962, starring Vincent Price as Richard (Price had played Clarence in the earlier version). Richard is a thorough-paced villain in both versions. Neither film owes much to the Shakespeare play, but the 1962 Corman version has similarities to Macbeth, complete with paradoxical prophesies, and visions of bloodied ghosts. Unusually, Richard's wife Anne is portrayed, like Lady Macbeth, as an ally, egging him on in his evil plans.

Despite his having died at the age of 32, Richard is often depicted as being considerably older: Laurence Olivier was 47 (in his 1955 film), Vincent Price was 51, Ian McKellen was 56 as was Pacino in his 1996 film (although Pacino was 39 when he played him on Broadway in 1979, and Olivier was 37 when he played him on stage in 1944). Ron Cook was 35 when he played Richard III in the 1983 BBC Shakespeare production of the play. Aneurin Barnard was 25 at the time of filming, and Cumberbatch 38.

York Theatre Royal introduced a recreation of Richard III and his voice by FaceLab in November 2024.

=== Films ===
Richard has been portrayed by the following actors on film, mostly in versions of the Shakespeare play:

- William V. Ranous in the silent short Richard III (1908), dramatising a part of Shakespeare's play.
- Frank Benson in the silent short Richard III (1911), also dramatising a part of Shakespeare's play.
- Frederick Warde in the silent Shakespeare adaptation Richard III (1912), one of the earliest American feature films.
- Rolf Leslie in the silent film Jane Shore (1915), an adaptation of the play The Tragedy of Jane Shore by Nicholas Rowe.
- John Barrymore in The Show of Shows (1929), in the Henry VI Part III segment.
- Basil Rathbone in Tower of London (1939), a horror film loosely dramatising Richard's rise to power.
- Lowell Gilmore in The Black Arrow (1948), a dramatisation of the novel The Black Arrow: A Tale of the Two Roses by Robert Louis Stevenson.
- Laurence Olivier in the Shakespeare adaptation Richard III (1955), for which he was nominated for the Academy Award for Best Actor and won the BAFTA Award for Best British Actor
- Vincent Price in the remake of Tower of London (1962); Price had played the Duke of Clarence in the original film.
- Ramaz Chkhikvadze in a Russian version of the Shakespeare play, Richard III (1980).
- Ariel García Valdés in a French version of the Shakespeare play, Richard III (1986).
- Ian McKellen in Richard III (1995), set in a fictional fascist England, for which he was nominated for the BAFTA Award for Best Actor in a Leading Role
- Al Pacino in Looking for Richard (1996), Pacino's free-form exploration of the character and the play.
- Jamie Martin in Richard III (2005), a modernised version set on a Brighton housing estate.
- Scott Anderson in Richard III (2008), a modern-day version.
- In a play within a play in Neil Simon's 1977 film The Goodbye Girl, Richard Dreyfuss's character reluctantly portrays Richard as a stereotypically effeminate homosexual at the insistence of an avant-garde director.
- Stephen Frears directs The Lost King (2022) starring Harry Lloyd as the ghost of King Richard III.

=== Television ===
Richard has been portrayed on television by:

- William Windom in Shakespeare's Richard III (1950), an episode of the American series Masterpiece Playhouse
- Paul Daneman in the BBC series An Age of Kings (1960), which contained all the history plays from Richard II to Richard III, and in the drama Traitor's Gate (1962)
- Wolfgang Kieling in the West German TV version of Shakespeare's play König Richard III (1964)
- Ian Holm in War of the Roses (1965), which was a filmed version of the Royal Shakespeare Company performing all three parts of Henry VI and Richard III
- Adalberto Maria Merli in the Italian serial La Freccia nera (1968), an adaptation of The Black Arrow
- Péter Haumann in III. Richárd (1973), a Hungarian version of Shakespeare's play
- Colin Starkey in "Who Killed the Princes in the Tower?", an episode of the BBC drama documentary series Second Verdict (1976)
- Ron Cook in the BBC Shakespeare versions of Henry VI, Part 2, Henry VI, Part 3 and The Tragedy of Richard the Third (1983)
- Andrew Jarvis in the BBC series The Wars of the Roses (1989), which included all of Shakespeare's history plays performed by the English Shakespeare Company
- Antony Sher (voice) in the BBC series Shakespeare: The Animated Tales (1994)
- Paul Mohan in an episode of the British educational TV series Historyonics entitled "Richard III" (2004)
- Benedict Cumberbatch portrayed Richard in the second season of The Hollow Crown (2016), an adaptation of Shakespeare's historical plays.
- Mitsuki Saiga in Japanese and Ciarán Strange in English in the 2022 TV anime adaptation of the manga Requiem of the Rose King.
- "The Trial of King Richard the Third" was a modern-day simulated trial aired on the BBC on February 21, 1984; in which King Richard III is tried for the murder of King Edward V and Prince Richard of Shrewsbury. Richard is not depicted directly, but being "inescapably absent" is tried in absentia.
- Jim Howick in the CBBC children's television show Horrible Histories; Richard III sings a power ballad in which he attempts to restore his reputation.
- Aneurin Barnard in The White Queen, the 2013 television dramatisation of Philippa Gregory's Cousins' War novels.
- Peter Cook in the pilot episode of the 1983 British historical sitcom Blackadder. In the series', Richard is a parody of Laurence Olivier's depiction; Richard in this continuity is a kind, benevolent monarch, who defeats Henry Tudor at the aforementioned battle but is accidentally killed by bumbling noble Edmund, Duke of Edinburgh (Rowan Atkinson).

== Other ==
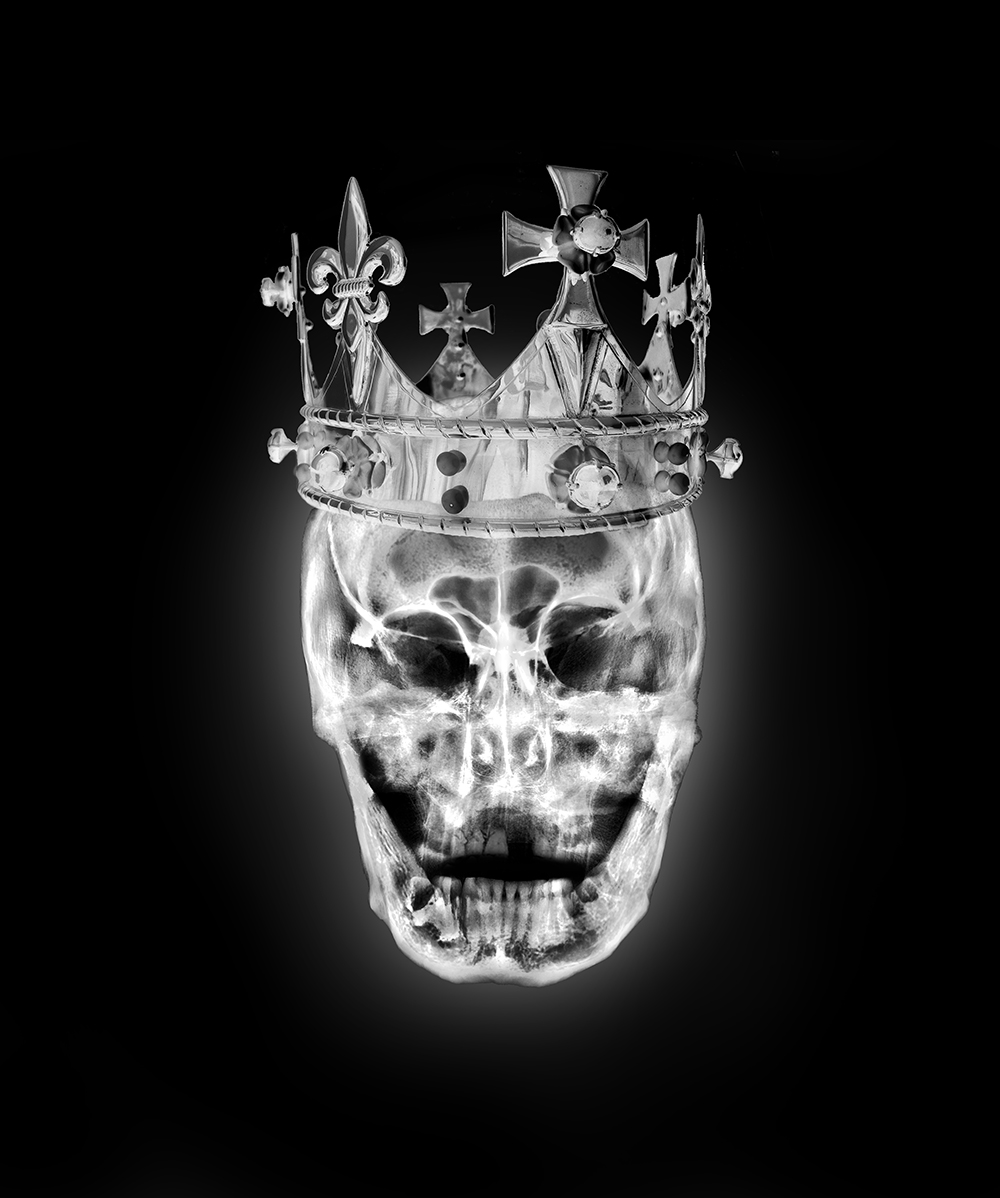
The King by Alexander de Cadenet, based on an x-ray of King Richard III (photographic print on aluminium, 2016)

- In 2016 contemporary British artist Alexander de Cadenet presented a skull-portrait of Richard III in conjunction with Leicester University. The portrait was produced using University of Leicester forensic X-ray scans of the king.
- Richard III has the dubious distinction of being immortalised in Cockney rhyming slang, Richard the Third meaning turd. In the Thames Television series Minder, a different use of rhyming slang is made when Arthur describes a girlfriend of his minder Terry's as being a "comely Richard" (i.e. Richard the Third = bird, a British slang term for "girl"). The "bird" meaning was also used by Ronnie Barker in a comedy sketch in which he played a clergyman giving a sermon in rhyming slang. This seems more logical, given that in baby talk, a bird is commonly a "dicky-bird", and "Dick" is a common short form of Richard.
- Britpop band Supergrass have a song titled Richard III on their album In It for the Money.
- Richard Lawrence, who tried but failed to assassinate U.S. President Andrew Jackson in 1835, was under the delusion that he was actually King Richard III.
- Stephen Beckett plays Richard III in the Doctor Who audio drama The Kingmaker.
- Slysheen, a character from Yu-Gi-Oh! The Duelists of the Roses, is portrayed as Richard III.
- Peter Sellers slyly mocks both the Beatles and Laurence Olivier's portrayal of Richard III by reciting the lyrics to A Hard Day's Night in costume and delivery that parody Olivier in a recording that he reprised on a television show (available from YouTube).
- It has been posited that character of Humpty Dumpty was inspired by Richard III. This theory, advanced by Katherine Elwes Thomas in 1930 and adopted by Robert Ripley, posits that Humpty Dumpty is Richard III, depicted in Tudor histories, and particularly in Shakespeare's play, as humpbacked and who was defeated, despite his armies at Bosworth Field in 1485. However, the term "humpback" was not recorded until the eighteenth century, and no direct evidence linking the rhyme with the historical figure has been advanced.
- In German productions of musical Tanz Der Vampire (Dance of the Vampires) at the ball of Count von Krolock there are several historical figures among vampires, including Richard III and his wife Anne Neville. The musical is based on a 1967 horror comedy film "The Fearless Vampire Killers" directed by Roman Polanski, where Richard III also appears as a vampire at the ball. His portrait hangs on the wall in Alfred's bedroom in Count von Krolock's castle.
- American folk/indie artist Sparklehorse has a song titled Homecoming Queen, which follows Richard III's thoughts as he dies at the Battle of Bosworth, specifically thoughts of his wife, Anne Neville. The song plays on the fourth scene of the fifth act of Shakespeare's Richard III, with its opening lines, "A horse, a horse/My kingdom for a horse", but appears to view Richard III in a sympathetic light with its strange, regretful melancholy.
- An anime adaptation of Shakespeare's works, Baraou no Souretsu (Requiem of the Rose King) was released in January, 2022. The story follows Richard's and Henry VI's life and depicts the events that took place during the War of the Roses.
- Dunedin, New Zealand, Rock band Soulseller have a song titled 'Bloody Richard' from their debut self-titled album. The song opens and closes with quotes from Shakespeare's play.
- The music video for Leicester-based rock band Kasabian's 2017 single "Ill Ray (The King)" features an occultist (Lena Headey) resurrecting Richard (Michael Socha) from his burial site beneath a car park and taking him day-drinking in contemporary Leicester city centre. The video was directed by Dan Cadan.
- He bears a striking resemblance to the character Lord Farquaad in the 2001 DreamWorks animation Shrek.
