= Shakespeare and Star Trek =

References to the English playwright in the science fiction franchise

Jean-Luc Picard (Patrick Stewart) holds a book of Shakespeare's work in the 1987 Star Trek: The Next Generation episode "Hide and Q"

The Star Trek franchise, begun in 1966, has frequently included stories inspired by and alluding to the works of William Shakespeare. The science fiction franchise includes television series, films, comic books, novels and games, and has material both Star Trek canon and non-canon. Many of the actors involved have been part of Shakespearean productions, including Patrick Stewart and Christopher Plummer.

== Background ==
Jean-Luc Picard: "Well, Number One, you can never go wrong with Shakespeare."
—Picard's advice to Riker about what to say in his wedding vows, from " 'Til Death", short story by Bob Ingersoll and Thomas F. Zahler, 2007

Shakespeare's work has a strong presence in the Star Trek universe. There are several opinions on why this is, and a 1995 issue of Extrapolation was dedicated to the subject. Suggestions and speculation include the creators' appreciation of, and pleasure in, these works; their inclusion may also signal that something is "high culture", "elitist" or "repressive". Critics have suggested that the purpose is to give the franchise a veneer of sophistication or cultural legitimation. The character Jean-Luc Picard (Shakespearean actor Patrick Stewart) argues that Shakespeare provides moving insights into the human condition.

According to Shakespearean scholar Craig Dionne, Star Trek's use of Shakespeare "mirrors a long and largely unexamined aspect of Shakespeare's 'common place' in American culture". Shakespearean scholar Brandon Christopher argued that "'Shakespeare' for Star Trek should be understood not simply as a collection of culturally valued texts but as emblematic of a nineteenth-century ethos of Anglo-American world dominance repackaged for a 1980s audience".

== The Original Series ==
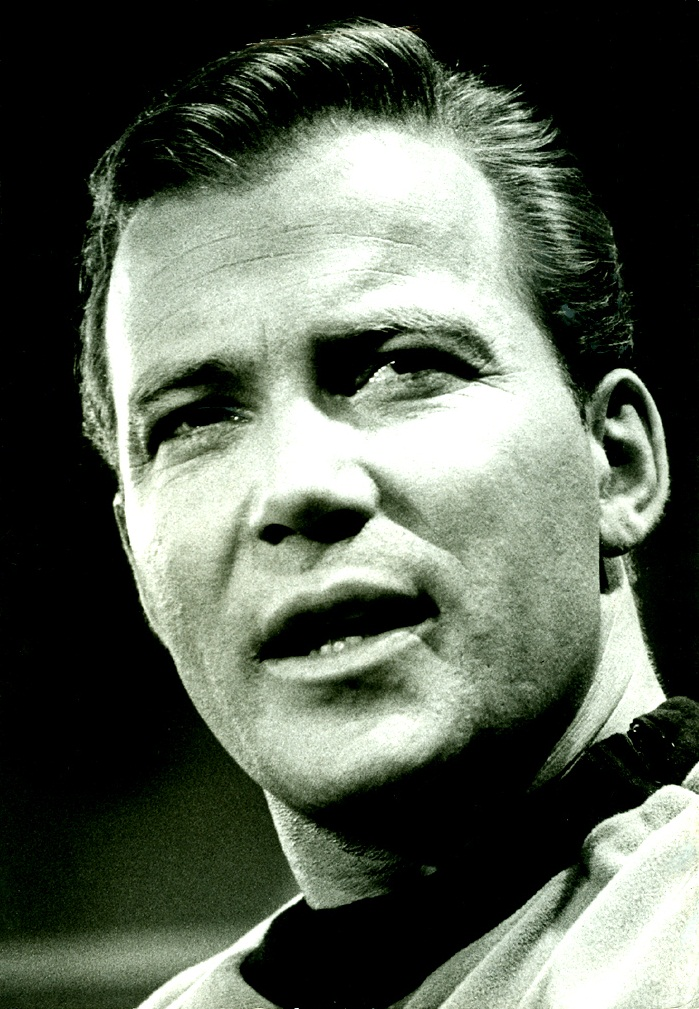
William Shatner as Captain James T. Kirk, 1966

Star Trek began in 1966 and used Shakespeare's works as one of many "preexisting motifs", including gangsters, the Old West, and Greco-Roman mythology. According to Shakespeare actor Andy Kirtland, "Smart writers won't try to reinvent the wheel, and so plots and characters are borrowed in such a way as to nod to the past, but be relevant to the present". He says that The Tempest is probably the Shakespeare play that best fits in a science fiction context, "reconciling the past with the future and in general, dealing with a world in transition".

William Shatner, who played Captain James T. Kirk, had previously acted in several Shakespearean plays, including Julius Caesar as Mark Antony. When Shakespearean actor Christopher Plummer in the mid-1950s played the title role in Henry V in Stratford, Ontario, Shatner was his understudy, and successfully filled in for him one night when he was sick. According to Shatner, that was the night he knew he was an actor. Plummer later commented: "He didn't do what I did at all. Where I stood up to make a speech, he sat down. He did the opposite of everything I did. And I knew that son of a bitch was going to be a star." Shatner's album The Transformed Man (1968) included readings from Shakespearean plays.

Kirk says that Shakespeare is his favorite author. The episodes "The Conscience of the King" and "Catspaw" included scenes from Shakespearean plays. In "Requiem for Methuselah", the immortal Flint possesses a First Folio, and together with "Is There in Truth No Beauty?", the episode borrows from The Tempest. In "Bread and Circuses", the character Claudius Marcus wears Shakespeare's coat of arms on his robe. The titles of the episodes "All Our Yesterdays", "By Any Other Name", "The Conscience of the King" and "Dagger of the Mind" are all lines from Shakespeare.

Star Trek II: The Wrath of Khan shares themes with King Lear, and the play can be seen on the antagonist Khan Noonien Singh's bookshelf. In Star Trek IV: The Voyage Home, Dr. Leonard McCoy, doubting Spock's restored faculties, at one point mutters "Angels and ministers of grace, defend us", which Spock immediately identifies as "Hamlet, act I, scene IV".

The subtitle of Star Trek VI: The Undiscovered Country (1991) is also a Shakespeare line, from Hamlet. (Note: The phrase "The undiscovered country" appears in Hamlet, Act 3, Scene 1, line 80.) In this film, the Klingons appreciate Shakespeare greatly, and the film's antagonist General Chang (Christopher Plummer) quotes him extensively. Director Nicholas Meyer, a Shakespeare enthusiast, found inspiration for the character by listening to a CD with Plummer performing from Henry V. Shakespeare scholar Kay H. Smith says "Everybody in our ever-widening English-speaking world is expected to recognize a little Shakespeare, and Star Trek VI makes it easy by assigning almost all the quotations to one character, so we can all play the game," and that combining high and low culture can be fruitful as well as problematic.

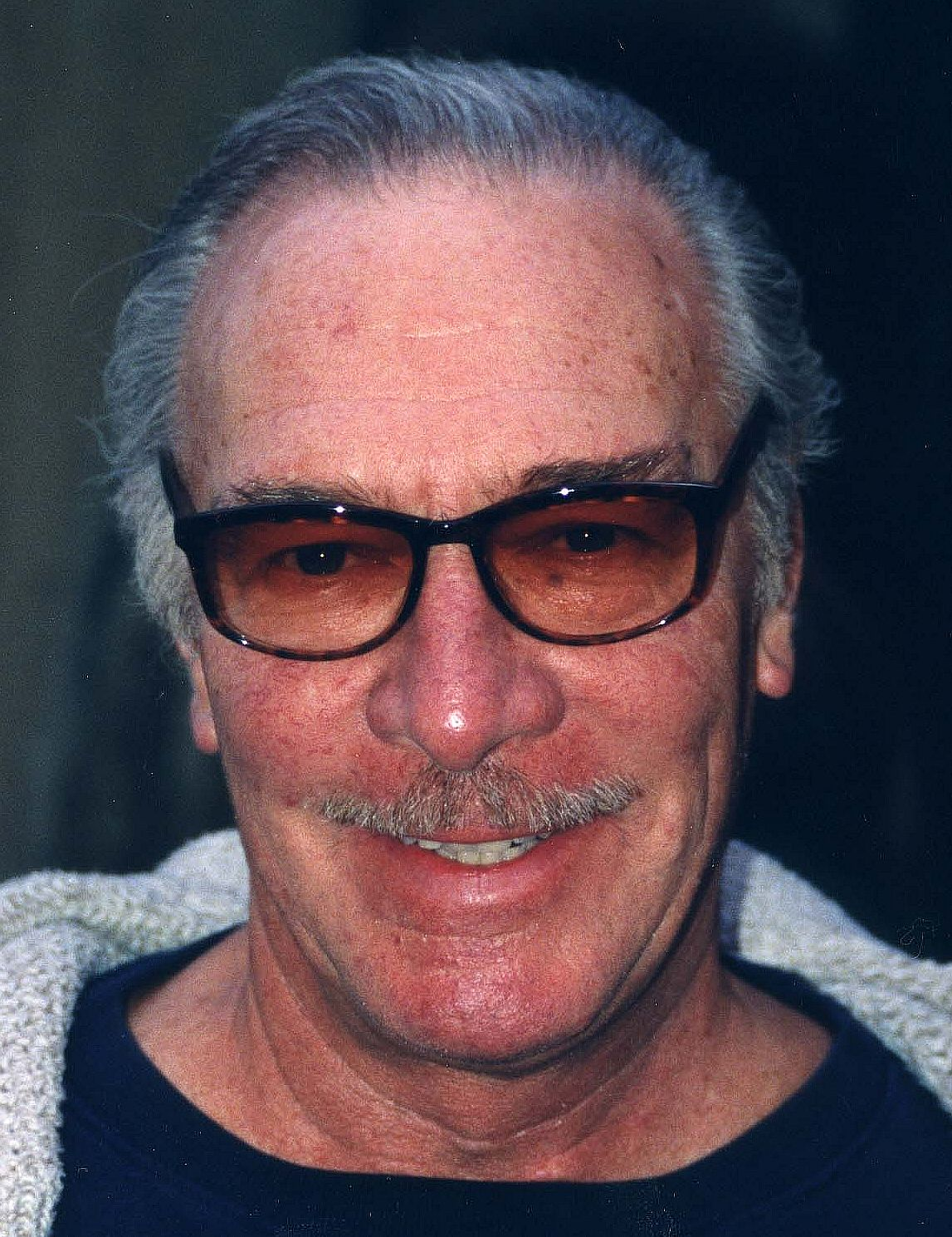
Christopher Plummer in 1995

Like several of Shakespeare's tragic heroes, Chang is a "military aristocrat", and Plummer reprised the role in the computer game Star Trek: Klingon Academy (2000), where Chang gives the player's missions Shakespearean names. In the film, while attacking the Enterprise, Chang's Shakespeare quotations become so abundant that Leonard McCoy exclaims "I'd give real money if he'd shut up!" According to Smith, McCoy echoes the feelings of those in the audience who have experienced bad performances, bad teachers, and a "cultural establishment that insists on defending the cause of Shakespearean hegemony while simultaneously commodifying it". She says that Plummer's Chang has potential to be a great villain like Richard III, but falls short and becomes flat. Rolling Stone and Time have both ranked the character among the 10 greatest Star Trek villains.

Plummer said that while he greatly enjoyed the part of Chang, he regretted that David Warner (Chancellor Gorkon) got what Plummer considered to be the best line in the film, "You've not experienced Shakespeare until you've read him in the original Klingon". Academics have suggested several interpretations of this line, some seeing it as a joke, others as something more serious.

Mark: So you'll play all the parts?
Shatner: Well, I can't play Calpurnia (laughs). I thought I'd get Sharon Stone for that.
Mark: She actually could be difficult to get.
Shatner: Then we'll get Heather Locklear. I know her.
Mark: If you play both Caesar and Brutus, won't you have to stab yourself in the back?

— Free Enterprise, 1999.

The film inspired the creation of The Klingon Hamlet (1996), a translation of Hamlet into the constructed Klingon language. Parts of it have been performed by the Washington Shakespeare Company. Much Ado About Nothing (2001) has also been translated. The translations are put in a framing story where Shakespeare (Wil'yam Shex'pir) actually was a Klingon, and characters like Hamlet (Khamlet), Benedick and Beatrice (B'enerdik and B'eterirsh) are discussed in the context of Klingon culture. In this setting, the English versions are the actual translations, and have acquired the status of originals through a campaign of deception. Karolina Kazimierczak, sociologist, compares the Klingon translations to The Maori Merchant of Venice (2002).

In the romantic comedy Free Enterprise (1999), Shatner, playing himself, is approached by two trekkies and hopes with their help to produce a musical version of Julius Caesar.

== The Next Generation ==
When Star Trek: The Next Generation (TNG) began in 1987, Patrick Stewart was referred to as an "unknown British Shakespearean actor" by the Los Angeles Times. TNG actor Brent Spiner put this "title" on a sign and hung it on Stewart's trailer door. Stewart's Shakespearean background was one aspect that made Gene Roddenberry, Star Trek's creator, consider him for the role of Captain Jean-Luc Picard. Stewart, a member of the Royal Shakespeare Company (RSC) 1966–1982, has said: "All the time I spent sitting around on the thrones of England as various Shakespearean kings was nothing but a preparation for sitting in the captain's chair on the Enterprise".

Jean-Luc Picard: Ohh, I know Hamlet! And what he might say with irony, I say with conviction! What a piece of work is man! How noble in reason, how infinite in faculty! In form and moving how express and admirable! In action how like an angel, in apprehension how like a god!
Q: Surely you don't see your species like that, do you?
Picard: I see us one day becoming that, Q. Is it that which concerns you?

— "Hide and Q", 1987

Picard keeps a collection of Shakespeare's work titled The Globe Illustrated Shakespeare, and this book is seen frequently throughout the series. It reappeared when Stewart returned to the role in Star Trek: Picard in 2020. The android Data has his own book of Shakespeare's work. Picard often quotes Shakespeare, for example when dealing with the powerful entity Q (played by John de Lancie, himself a member of the American Shakespeare Festival).

The episodes "The Defector" and "Emergence" included scenes from Shakespearean plays. In "The Defector", Stewart plays Michael Williams from Henry V as well as Picard. Spiner's character Data plays Henry V and Prospero (in "Emergence"). Picard tells him, "Data, you're here to learn about the human condition and there is no better way of doing that than by embracing Shakespeare". Later in the episode, Picard asks Data about the crew's morale, since Picard, unlike Henry V, cannot easily walk disguised among the crew and gauge it himself. Data and Picard discuss the Prospero character in "Emergence". In "Time's Arrow", part 2, Picard and an away team have travelled back in time to 19th century Earth. Picard attempts to persuade a landlady that they are, in fact, a group of actors performing A Midsummer Night's Dream. In "Ménage à Troi", he has to woo Lwaxana Troi with romantic Shakespearean speech.

David Warner, who had appeared in Star Trek V: The Final Frontier and VI, played a character who tortures Picard in "Chain of Command". Stewart and Warner had met and become friends when Stewart joined the RSC in the 1960s, and one of Stewart's reasons for joining was having seen a Hamlet production with Warner in the title role.

Armin Shimerman, who was one of the first on-screen Ferengi in "The Last Outpost" and later Quark in Star Trek: Deep Space Nine (DS9), thought of the race as the Richard IIIs of space. Richard III is one of many Shakespeare plays Shimerman has appeared in.

In Diane Duane's novel Dark Mirror (1994), Picard encounters literature from the brutal Mirror Universe. He finds Shakespeare "horribly changed in all but the parts that were already horrible". In The Merchant of Venice, Portia successfully argues for Shylock's right to a pound of flesh. However, Titus Andronicus, Macbeth and King Lear are mostly unchanged.

== Deep Space Nine ==
Garak: But I'm sorry, Doctor, I just don't see the value of this man's work.
Bashir: Garak, Shakespeare is one of the giants of human literature.
Garak: I knew Brutus was going to kill Caesar in the first act, but Caesar didn't figure it out until the knife is in his back.

— "Improbable Cause", 1995

Avery Brooks was an experienced Shakespearean actor before playing Commander/Captain Benjamin Sisko in Star Trek: Deep Space Nine (DS9, 1993). Armin Shimerman is a Shakespearean actor and teacher of Shakespeare. In 2005, Brooks played the title role of Othello. Eight years earlier, Stewart had played that role at the same stage in Washington, D.C., in a production that reversed the racial roles of Othello and Iago.

René Auberjonois (who plays Odo in DS9) said that "Actors with a background in the larger-than-life works of Shakespeare — or even musical comedy — adapt easily to non-real characters and bring a sense of truth to them". Alexander Siddig (Julian Bashir) stated that everyone in the DS9 cast had done more Shakespeare than he had had hot dinners.

Robert O'Reilly (the Klingon Gowron in TNG and DS9) said that doing a lot of Shakespeare was helpful for playing a Klingon. Richard Herd, who played another Klingon, agreed that he found his character very Shakespearean.

In the episode "Improbable Cause", the characters Elim Garak and Julian Bashir discuss the merits of Shakespeare and Julius Caesar, Garak being very skeptical. However, he quotes the play in the following episode, "The Die Is Cast", showing new understanding.

Brooks directed "Fascination", in which several characters mysteriously become strongly attracted to each other. It was inspired by A Midsummer Night's Dream, specifically the 1935 film version.

== Other series ==
Shakespeare is mostly absent in Star Trek: Voyager (1995) and Star Trek: Enterprise (2001). The Voyager episode "Mortal Coil" is named after a line in Hamlet. In the Enterprise episode "Cogenitor", an alien captain receives a gift of Earth literature, including Shakespeare.

In the Star Trek: Discovery (2017) episode "Perpetual Infinity", Spock quotes Hamlet (Act 1, Scene 5), to which Michael Burnham replies "Hamlet, hell yeah".

The titles of the Star Trek: Strange New Worlds (2023) episodes "A Quality of Mercy" (The Merchant of Venice, Act 4, Scene 1) and "Tomorrow and Tomorrow and Tomorrow" (Macbeth, Act 5, Scene 5) are Shakespeare references.
