= Waking Moments =

- Star Trek: Voyager episode
- Episode no.: Season 4 Episode 13
- Directed by: Alexander Singer
- Written by: André Bormanis
- Production code: 182
- Original air date: January 14, 1998

Guest appearances
- Mark Colson - Dream Alien; Jennifer Grundy - Ensign

Episode chronology
← Previous "Mortal Coil"	Next → "Message in a Bottle"
- Star Trek: Voyager season 4

"Waking Moments" is the 81st episode of Star Trek: Voyager, the 13th episode of the fourth season. This episode focuses on the dreams the crew of a spacecraft are having, as they make their way back to Earth after being stranded on the other side of the galaxy, in the Star Trek universe.

This episode was written by Andre Bormanis and directed by Alexander Singer, it aired January 14, 1998 on UPN.

== Plot ==
The episode opens with the dream sequences of Voyager senior staff. The two commonalities between the dreams are that they are all nightmares and that in each dream, an unknown alien appears towards the end. Upon waking, and reporting to their duty shifts on the bridge, the captain and first officer compare dreams, and when noting the common strange alien in their dreams, Tom Paris notes that the same alien appeared in his dream. At this point it is realized that Harry Kim has not reported for duty yet. After failing to respond to the bridge hails, Janeway takes Tuvok to Kim's quarters in an attempt to find out why he isn't responding to hails. Upon entering Kim's quarters, they find him asleep and are unable to wake him up. They take him to sickbay for further examination. The Doctor explains that Kim and several other crew members are in a hyper-REM state and that he cannot wake them, even through medical means. The Doctor advises that everyone avoid going to sleep for the time being.

It is realized that Voyager is experiencing contact with an alien race which lives out its life in a dream state. Chakotay mentions that he has mastered a skill of his native people called "lucid dreaming". Before entering a dream state, Chakotay provides himself with a trigger image, Earth's Moon, that will remind him that he is still dreaming and can restore himself to a conscious state. Suddenly he is asleep and in his dream, he is holding a spear and is deer hunting through the corridors of Voyager. When the deer enters the mess hall, he sees the full moon outside the window and realizes he's dreaming. A few seconds later, he sees the deer again but it transforms into the alien. The two men fight but Chakotay manages to subdue the alien who expresses surprise that Chakotay can control his dream. Chakotay then forces the alien to tell him how the other crew members can wake up. The alien tells him that once they pass the aliens' space they will awake. Chakotay taps his hand three times and is instantly awake in sickbay.

Upon reaching their desired destination however, it is realized that Voyager was deceived and was actually directed to the heart of the "Dream Aliens" space. First, a few crewmen cannot awaken, then the aliens attack. The attack occurs in the guise of crew members being put into a sleep state. The aliens take over the ship, or so it seems. The remainder of the crew are now not only in a state of sleep, but they all share the same dream.

Chakotay uses lucid dreaming to escape the collective unconscious. With chemical assistance provided by the Doctor he manages to stay awake long enough to locate the planet that is generating the neurogenic field which is keeping the crew unconscious and asleep. He then transports to the surface of the planet and finds a large cavern where thousands of the aliens appear in a state of sleep. He orders The Doctor to target the cave with a photon torpedo and destroy it if he does not hear from Chakotay in five minutes. Chakotay then wakes one of the aliens and orders him to turn off the field or he will open fire. Before he can take any further action, Chakotay falls asleep due to exhaustion and once again enters the dream. There, he tells the aliens that they will all be killed if they do not stop this dream immediately after which they comply and allow Voyager to proceed. The only side effect to this encounter is insomnia.

== Reception ==
In 2012, Den of Geek ranked this as an honorable mention as a candidate for their ranking of the top ten episodes of Star Trek: Voyager.

Tor.com gave this episode 7 out 10, noting that the script "plays with expectations".

== Releases ==
In 2017, the complete Star Trek: Voyager television series was released in a DVD box set with special features.
