= Mortal Coil (Star Trek: Voyager) =

- Star Trek: Voyager episode
- Episode no.: Season 4 Episode 12
- Directed by: Allan Kroeker
- Written by: Bryan Fuller
- Cinematography by: Marvin V. Rush
- Production code: 180
- Original air date: December 17, 1997

Guest appearances
- Nancy Hower - Samantha Wildman; Brooke Stephens - Naomi Wildman; Robin Stapler - Alixia

Episode chronology
← Previous "Concerning Flight"	Next → "Waking Moments"
- Star Trek: Voyager season 4

"Mortal Coil" is the twelfth episode of the fourth season of the American science fiction television series Star Trek: Voyager, the 80th episode overall. The episode originally aired on December 17, 1997, on the UPN network. Directed by Allan Kroeker, it was written by Bryan Fuller, and produced by Kenneth Biller and Joe Menosky.

Set in the 24th century, the series follows the adventures of the Starfleet and Maquis crew of the starship USS Voyager after they were stranded in the Delta Quadrant far from the rest of the Federation. In this episode, it deals with a starring character's death, resurrection, and crisis of faith.

Mortal coil is a poetic term for living, from the play Hamlet by Shakespeare.

== Plot ==
Neelix is killed while participating in a survey mission of a protomatter nebula. Using a technique devised by Seven of Nine, however, the Doctor is able to revive Neelix after being dead for nearly 19 hours. Distressed that he had not perceived the afterlife while he was dead, Neelix begins to question his religious beliefs. With the aid of Chakotay, Neelix embarks on a spiritual vision quest, during which he confronts his dead sister, Alixia, who mocks him and then dies and crumbles into dust. He then finds himself on a slab, surrounded by visions of his shipmates, who tell him that life is irrelevant and that he knows what he has to do.

Convinced that his existence is meaningless and that his life has no purpose, Neelix decides to commit suicide by transporting himself into the nebula. Despite the attempts of his shipmates, Neelix prepares to beam off until Ensign Samantha Wildman arrives to ask Neelix if he could console Naomi, who believes she saw a monster in the replicator and who will only allow Neelix to tuck her in. Realizing that he does, indeed, have purpose in his life, Neelix relents and heads for the Wildmans' quarters. Once there, Naomi, who had heard that Neelix was sick, wonders if a monster had got him. "Yes", Neelix replies, "But I chased him away."

== Theme ==
In this episode, Neelix's religious faith is seriously challenged; he eventually chooses to live without it. Chakotay serves as a counterpoint to his perspective, encouraging Neelix not to abandon all faith. In Star Trek: The Human Frontier, Michèle and Duncan Barrett discuss this episode as an example of Star Trek's shifting attitudes towards religion, specifically Voyager's treatment of religious faith and how it can change. The Barretts contrast this episode with "Sacred Ground," in which the rationalist Captain Janeway (Kate Mulgrew) is forced to accept the possibility of forces outside rational explanation. Both episodes are considered as illustrations of how "Star Trek articulates the conflicts between religion and science that continue to recur in modern western thought."

Actor Ethan Phillips, who plays Neelix, said he felt the episode was the most rewarding of the show for him, and that it was one of his favorites. "I thought that was a beautiful show," he said, "It was very existential [...] and very well directed by Allan Kroeker."

== Reception ==
Ian Grey at RogertEbert.com noted this episode in 2013 in their feature on Star Trek: Voyager, pointed out "Mortal Coil" as an exploration of a "spiritual crisis" and afterlife beliefs.

The Hollywood Reporter ranked "Mortal Coil" as 81st best Star Trek of the franchises' episodes in 2016, and the 13th best Star Trek: Voyager episode. TrekNews.net ranked this the 7th best episode of Star Trek:Voyager in 2016.

In 2020, SyFy Wire ranked this episode the 12th best episode of Star Trek: Voyager, elaborating it has a "dark, brooding storyline" focused on the troubles of Neelix. In 2016, SyFy Wire had ranked it the 15th best Bryan Fuller episode (that he had a writing credit for), but lamenting that "Neelix episode starts at an automatic handicap because Neelix is awful" and said it failed its portrayal of faith. However, they were impressed that it took on suicide. Den of Geek, said it was actually the 6th best Bryan Fuller writing credit, and recognized it as one of the best "Neelix episodes" and praised it for tackling tough subject material.

In 2020, Tor.com gave this 5 out 10, remarking "This should’ve been a great episode, and in many ways it is..." but struggled with many details of the plot. They were happy with Philips, saying "Phillips knocks it out of the park here".

== Releases ==
In 2017, the complete Star Trek: Voyager television series was released in a DVD box set with special features.

== See also ==
- Shakespeare and Star Trek
