= The True Tragedy of Richard III =

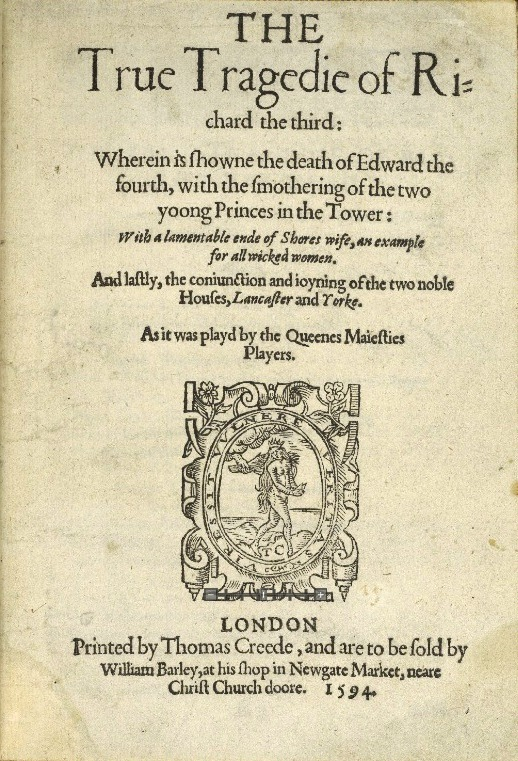
Cover of the 1594 quarto of The True Tragedy of Richard III, which was "[p]rinted by Thomas Creede and ... to be sold by William Barley, at his shop in Newgate Market".

The True Tragedy of Richard III is an anonymous Elizabethan history play on the subject of Richard III of England. It has attracted the attention of scholars of English Renaissance drama principally for the question of its relationship with William Shakespeare's Richard III.

The title spelling that appears on the cover page of the quarto is The True Tragedie of Richard the third.

The True Tragedy of Richard III should not be confused with The True Tragedy of Richard, Duke of York; the latter is the early alternative version of Shakespeare's Henry VI, Part 3.

== Publication ==
The play was entered into the Stationers' Register on 19 June 1594; it appeared in print later that year, in a quarto printed and published by Thomas Creede and sold by the stationer William Barley, "at his shop in Newgate Market, near Christ Church door." In addition to Creede's 1594 quarto, another edition of the play was "Printed at London by W.W. for Thomas Millington and are to be sold at his shoppe under Saint Peters Church in Cornewall, 1600." "Cornewall" is likely Cornhill; "under" meaning below, since it is on a hill. No further editions are known prior to the nineteenth century.

The full title was The true tragedie of Richard the third: wherein is showne the death of Edward the fourth, with the smothering of the two yoong princes in the Tower: with a lamentable ende of Shores wife, an example for all wicked women. And lastly, the coniunction and ioyning of the two noble houses, Lancaster and Yorke.

Only three copies of these editions of the play are known to have survived, all of which are now in the US. One copy is in the Pforzheimer Library of the Harry Ransom Center at the University of Texas, one is in the Folger Shakespeare Library, and one is in the Huntington Library.

W. W. Greg prepared a modern edition of the play, primarily from the Pforzheimer copy; it was published in 1929 by the Malone Society.

== Date ==
"The question of date is confused and unsettled." Most scholars and critics, relying on internal clues in the text, have estimated a date of authorship within a year or two of 1590, though dates as early as c. 1585 have also been posited.

The title page of the 1594 quarto states that the play was acted by the Queen Majesties Players. The title page of the 1600 quarto states that the play was acted "sundry" times by the "Right Honourable the Earle of Pembrooke his servantes". Any date of authorship for The True Tragedy in the mid-to-late 1580s to the early 1590s would be compatible with performance by the Queen's Men.

Critics generally judge the author of The True Tragedy to have been influenced by Thomas Legge's Latin play Richardus Tertius (c. 1580) – though that relationship is of little help in dating the True Tragedy.

== Sources and Genre ==
Apart from the question of Richardus Tertius, the author of The True Tragedy relied upon the standard historical sources of his generation for the story of Richard – principally Edward Hall's chronicle on the Wars of the Roses, and the chronicle by John Hardyng later continued by Richard Grafton.

While The True Tragedy clearly belongs to the genre of the Elizabethan history play, some critics have also pointed out its relationship with the revenge tragedy.

== Authorship ==
There is no external attribution of authorship for The True Tragedy; and the question of authorship is complicated by the fact that the single text of the play, the 1594 quarto, is notably inferior. Modern critics have tended to treat it as a bad quarto and a "reported text." Individual commentators have nominated Christopher Marlowe, Thomas Lodge, George Peele, and Thomas Kyd, among other writers of their generation, as possible authors or revisers of the play; but no scholarly consensus in favour of any single candidate or hypothesis has evolved.

== Characters ==
- Truth
- Poetry
- The Ghost of George, Duke of Clarence
- King Edward IV
- Lord Hastings
- Thomas Grey, Lord Marquess Dorset, son of the Queen
- Elizabeth, daughter of Edward IV
- Shore's Wife, mistress of Edward IV
- Hursly, Shore's Wife's maid
- Lodowick, servant to Lord Hastings
- Morton, a serving man
- Richard, Duke of Gloucester, later King Richard the Third
- Sir William Catesby, Richard's follower
- Percival, a messenger from Buckingham
- Edward, Prince of Wales, briefly King Edward V
- Richard, Duke of York, brother of Edward V
- Anthony Woodville, Earl Rivers, brother to Queen Elizabeth
- Lord Grey, brother to Queen Elizabeth
- Sir Richard Haute
- Sir Thomas Vaughan
- Elizabeth Woodville, the Queen Mother, widow of Edward IV
- The Duke of Buckingham
- Sir Robert Brakenbury, Lieutenant of the Tower
- James Tyrrell, a follower of Richard III
- Myles Forrest, a keeper in the Tower
- Will Slaughter, a murderer
- Jack Denton, a murderer
- Ralph Banistre, servant to Buckingham
- Lord Stanley, stepfather of Richmond
- George Stanley, son of Lord Stanley
- Francis Lovell, 1st Viscount Lord Lovell
- Henry, Earl of Richmond, later King Henry VII
- Pierre Landais, treasurer to the Duke of Brittany
- Captain Blunt

== And Shakespeare ==
The True Tragedy bears a general resemblance to Shakespeare's Richard III, as any play on the same subject would. Critics are not unanimous on the view that Shakespeare used The True Tragedy as a source for his play, though the majority tend to favour this judgement. Geoffrey Bullough treats The True Tragedy as a "probable source" for Richard III, citing several commonalities (as when, in both plays, Richard calls for a horse on Bosworth Field (1485), yet refuses to flee the battle) – though Bullough admits that the nature of the plays' relationship is "not clear."

The uncertainty in dating has allowed a few commentators to propose a reversed priority, and to argue that the author (or reviser) of The True Tragedy may have borrowed from Shakespeare's play.

Shakespeare appears to have known of The True Tragedy, since he paraphrases it in Hamlet, III, ii, 254, "the croaking raven doth bellow for revenge." Line 1892 in The True Tragedy reads "The screeking raven sits croking for revenge."

Unlike Shakespeare, "The True Tragedy" has no act or scene division.

== In Performance ==
In 2021 the Beyond Shakespeare Company released on-line a play-reading and discussion of The True Tragedy of Richard III.
