= Concerning Flight =

- Star Trek: Voyager episode
- Episode no.: Season 4 Episode 11
- Directed by: Jesús Salvador Treviño
- Story by: Jimmy Diggs; Joe Menosky
- Teleplay by: Joe Menosky
- Production code: 179
- Original air date: November 26, 1997

Guest appearances
- John Rhys-Davies - Leonardo da Vinci; John Vargas - Tau; Don Pugsley - Alien Visitor; Doug Spearman - Alien Buyer

Episode chronology
← Previous "Random Thoughts"	Next → "Mortal Coil"
- Star Trek: Voyager season 4

"Concerning Flight" is the 79th episode of Star Trek: Voyager, the 11th episode of season four. Set in the 24th century of the Star Trek science fiction universe, the series follows a Federation spaceship on its way home after being flung to the other side of the Galaxy. In this installment, the crew must retrieve stolen goods.

Actor John Rhys-Davies guest stars as a holographic Leonardo da Vinci.

== Plot ==
An enemy uses a high-energy transporter beam to steal valuable technology from Voyager, including their computer core and the Doctor's mobile holo-emitter. Captain Janeway and the crew track the stolen goods to an alien world that is an active center of commerce. When Tuvok and Janeway beam down to search, they encounter the holographic Leonardo da Vinci from Janeway's Florence holodeck program, who had been downloaded into the mobile emitter. Believing that he is in 16th century America, Leonardo has established a relationship with a wealthy "patron". He is constantly amazed by the technological marvels in this "New World".

Chakotay interrogates a local trader and learns that a man named Tau sells weapons and technology he steals from passing ships. As it turns out, Tau is Leonardo's patron. Posing as a buyer, Janeway attends one of Tau's parties, where Tau reveals that he has Voyager's computer core for sale. Armed with Leonardo's accurate topographic maps of the region, Tuvok and Seven of Nine locate the storage facility where the processor is kept, but a dispersion field around it makes transport impossible. They agree that Janeway will have to infiltrate the facility and initiate a power surge that will produce a signal strong enough for the transporter beam to lock onto. Unfortunately, Tau overhears Janeway talking to Voyager and trains a weapon on her. Leonardo knocks out Tau, then he and Janeway flee for the facility.

Once they find the processor, Janeway successfully executes Tuvok's plan, but an armed guard prevents the pair from beaming up with the computer. Janeway knocks out the guard. Leonardo has been shot, but being a hologram he is unhurt. He cannot comprehend this and demands an explanation. Janeway reminds him that it is a poor apprentice who cannot surpass their master, and explains that there are things that she understands and he cannot. They use a site-to-site transporter to beam themselves a good distance away into the countryside. They board a fixed-wing glider constructed by Leonardo and take off, just as Tau's guards open fire. Finally, Voyager is able to get close enough to the planet to beam aboard the Captain and her mentor.

== Reception ==
In 2020, The Digital Fix called the "Concerning Flight" a "delightful holodeck adventure" and praised it for its exploration of Captain Janeway's character.

Tor.com gave this 6 out 10, noting the actors "Rhys-Davies and Kate Mulgrew being amazing together" but wanting more from the rest of story.

== Releases ==
In 2017, the complete Star Trek: Voyager television series was released in a DVD box set with special features.
