= Gwynyth Walsh =

Canadian actress (born 1956)

- Born: 1956 (age 69–70); Winnipeg, Manitoba, Canada
- Education: University of Alberta (BFA)
- Occupations: Actress; producer
- Years active: 1983–present
- Known for: Star Trek: The Next Generation; Virgin River; Da Vinci's Inquest; Perry Mason
- Spouse: Christopher Britton (m. 2006)

Gwynyth Walsh (born 1956) is a Canadian actress best known for her role of the Star Trek character B'Etor, one of the Duras sisters. She also played constable Nimira in the Star Trek: Voyager episode "Random Thoughts", and provided the voice for the character Grey Mother, in the video game The Long Dark. Walsh earned her Bachelor of Fine Arts at the University of Alberta and started her career appearing on stage across Canada and in the United States in many classics. For Shakespeare's Much Ado About Nothing she won a Dramalogue Award - Best Actress for her portrayal of Beatrice. Her first appearance on screen was in a 1983 TV movie Pajama Tops.

== Filmography ==
=== Film ===
Year	Title	Role	Notes
1987	Blue Monkey	Rachel Carson	
1988	The Jeweler's Shop	Dr. Robert	
1992	The Portrait	Helen Schroeder	
1993	The Crush	Liv Forrester	
1994	Star Trek Generations	B'Etor	
1994	Soft Deceit	Capt. Brock	
1997	2103: The Deadly Wake	Martine Quiller	
1997	Titanic	Extra (Lady being forced on lifeboat)	
1997	Crossing Fields	Jessica	
2004	MXP: Most Extreme Primate	Julie	Video
2004	Flush	Sarah	Short
2006	The Sparkle Lite Motel	Sidura Abelson	Short
2008	Barbie in A Christmas Carol	Spirit of Christmas Future (voice)	Video
2009	No One Knows You Like Your Mother	Darlene Alberton	Short
2016	Chokeslam	Janet Swanson	
2017	A Family of Ghosts	Margaret	Short
2019	Miracle in East Texas	Classafay Vaudine	

=== Television ===
Year	Title	Role	Notes
1983	Pajama Tops	Claudine	TV film
1984	Iolanthe	Phoebe	TV film
1986	Adderly	Jennifer Christie	Episode: "A Change of Mind"
1986	Hot Shots	Lynda Martin	Episode: "Writ of Habeas Corpse"
1987, 1988	Street Legal	Val St. Clair, April Morgan	Episodes: "Take My Jokes, Please", "Equal Partners"
1988	Diamonds	Lucy Morrison	Episode: "Ay, There's the Rib"
1988	Night Heat	Dr. Eisley	Episode: "Woof"
1988	The Return of Ben Casey	Rita Gillete	TV film
1988	Captain Power and the Soldiers of the Future	Christine Larrabee	Episode: "Freedom One"
1988	T. and T.	Emma	Episode: "Now You See It"
1988	War of the Worlds	Charlotte	Episodes: "The Resurrection: Parts 1 & 2"
1988	My Secret Identity	Martha	Episode: "For Old Time's Sake"
1988	Starting from Scratch	Faith	Episode: "James in Love"
1988	The Christmas Wife	Betty	TV film
1989	Friday the 13th: The Series	Reatha Wilkerson	Episode: "13 O'Clock"
1989	Passion and Paradise	Lee Kingsley	TV film
1989	Alfred Hitchcock Presents	Anne Hathaway	Episode: "Driving Under the Influence"
1989	The Twilight Zone	Elaine	Episode: "Cat and Mouse"
1989	L.A. Law	Melanie Hayes	Episodes: "Leave It to Geezer", "His Suit is Hirsute"
1989	Alien Nation	Diane Elrea	Episode: "The Takeover"
1990	It's Garry Shandling's Show	Helen Falls	Episode: "Firehose"
1990, 1993	Matlock	Sandra Hopkins, Kiki Rice	Episodes: "The Blackmailer", "The Last Laugh"
1991	The Challengers	Angie Daniels	TV film
1991	Perry Mason: The Case of the Maligned Mobster	Maria Sorrento	TV film
1991	MacGyver	Montana	Episode: "High Control"
1991	The Girl from Mars	Stacey Moliet	TV film
1991	My Son Johnny	Janet David	TV film
1991, 1994	Star Trek: The Next Generation	B'Etor	Episodes: "Redemption", "Redemption II", "Firstborn"
1991, 1992	Tropical Heat	Marissa, Rachael Rockwell	Episodes: "Marissa", "Alive and Kicking"
1992	The Commish	Pam Reid	Episode: "Escape"
1993	Star Trek: Deep Space Nine	B'Etor	Episode: "Past Prologue"
1993	Darkness Before Dawn	Sandra Guard	TV film
1993	Without a Kiss Goodbye	Jenine	TV film
1994	In the Heat of the Night	Lula Finch	Episodes: "Give Me Your Life: Parts 1 & 2"
1994	Forever Knight	The Hunter	Episode: "Hunted"
1994	RoboCop: The Series	Tessa Stark	Episode: "Corporate Raiders"
1994	Melrose Place	Margaret Jeffers	Episode: "The Doctor Who Rocks the Cradle"
1994	Murder, She Wrote	Gina Powell	Episode: "Murder of the Month Club"
1995	Falling from the Sky: Flight 174	Pearl Dion	TV film
1995	The Other Mother: A Moment of Truth Movie	Barbara	TV film
1995–1996	One West Waikiki	Joan Williams	Episodes: "Holiday on Ice", "Kingmare on Night Street"
1996	Justice for Annie: A Moment of Truth Movie	Lydia Sawyer	TV film
1996	Sliders	Det. L. Specateli	Episode: "Love Gods"
1996	The Limbic Region	Ann Lucca	TV film
1996	Stand Against Fear: A Moment of Truth Movie	Vicky Cooke	TV film
1997	The Perfect Mother	Joy Pigeon	TV film
1997	Final Descent	Patty	TV film
1997	Star Trek: Voyager	Nimira	Episode: "Random Thoughts"
1998	Millennium	Miss Shetterly	Episode: "Anamesis"
1998–2002	Da Vinci's Inquest	Patricia Da Vinci	Main role (seasons 1–4)
1999	Zenon: Girl of the 21st Century	Astrid Kar	TV film
1999	Our Guys: Outrage at Glen Ridge	Mrs. Archer	TV film
1999	Twice in a Lifetime	Madeline Strong	Episode: "Sixteen Candles"
1999	A Gift of Love: The Daniel Huffman Story	Lynn Young	TV film
2000	ER	Barbara Knight	Episode: "Be Patient"
2000	Ice Angel	Mrs. Bryan	TV film
2000–2001	NYPD Blue	Dr. Timmons	Episodes: "Bats Off to Larry", "The Last Round Up", "Daveless in New York", "Waking Up Is Hard to Do"
2002	Tom Stone	Elaine	Episode: "Water"
2002	Stargate SG-1	Kelmaa / Queen Egeria	Episode: "Cure"
2002	Smallville	Mrs. Moore	Episode: "Nocturne"
2003	Stealing Christmas	Jo	TV film
2005	The Collector	Sheila Broderick	Episode: "The Campaign Manager"
2005	Masters of Horror	Katja	Episode: "Cigarette Burns"
2006	Flight 93	Esther Heyman	TV film
2006	Eight Days to Live	Jodeen Cassidy	TV film
2006	Commander in Chief	Jackie Ross	Episode: "Happy Birthday, Madam President"
2006	Holiday Wishes	Kelly King	TV film
2007	Nightmare	Dr. Edmonds	TV film
2007	Tin Man	Emily	TV miniseries
2008	Maternal Obsession	Inez Stanler	TV film
2008	Sea Beast	Barbara	TV film
2009	Storm Seekers	Dr. Johnson	TV film
2009	Knights of Bloodsteel	Raven	TV miniseries
2010	One Angry Juror	Marbella Walsh	TV film
2011	To the Mat	Mildred Bailor	TV film
2013	American Horror Story: Asylum	Dr. Stevens	Episode: "Spilt Milk"
2013	The Haunting Hour: The Series	Mrs. Niffenberger	Episode: "Worry Dolls"
2013	The Christmas Ornament	Eve Atkinson	TV film
2014	Continuum	Mariah	Episode: "Waning Minute"
2014	For Better or for Worse	Marianne	TV film
2014	The Lottery	Judge #1 / Elizabeth	Episode: "Crystal City"
2014	Heavenly Match	Sarah Brown	TV film
2015	A Gift of Miracles	Elaine Parsons	TV film
2015	The Whispers	Dr. Tully	Episodes: "The Archer", "Whatever It Takes"
2015	Tis the Season for Love	Shirley	TV film
2016	Beat Bugs	Doris (voice)	TV series short
2016	Journey Back to Christmas	Gretchen	TV film
2016	Van Helsing	Magdalene	Episodes: "Stay Away", "Last Time", "He's Coming"
2017	Hailey Dean Mystery: Deadly Estate	Doris Keating	TV film
2017	Like Cats & Dogs	Ellen	TV film
2017	My Favorite Wedding	Mrs. Tilton	TV film
2017	Final Vision	Perry MacDonald	TV film
2018	It's Christmas, Eve	Nella	TV film
2018	Homegrown Christmas	Peg Finley	TV film
2019	Black Summer	Barbara Watson	Recurring role
2019	The 100	Josephine Lightbourne VII	Episodes: "Nevermind", "Matryoshka"
2019	The Man in the High Castle	Margarethe Himmler	Episodes: "Happy Trails", "No Masters But Ourselves"
2019–present	Virgin River	Jo Ellen	Recurring role
2020	The Secret Ingredient	Mrs. McIntyre	TV film
