= Random Thoughts (Star Trek: Voyager) =

- Star Trek: Voyager episode
- Episode no.: Season 4 Episode 10
- Directed by: Alexander Singer
- Written by: Kenneth Biller
- Production code: 178
- Original air date: November 19, 1997

Guest appearances
- Gwynyth Walsh - Nimira; Wayne Pére - Guill; Rebecca McFarland - Talli; Ted Barba - Malin; Bobby Burns - Frane; Jeanette Miller - Miss Tembit

Episode chronology
| ← Previous "Year of Hell" | Next → "Concerning Flight" |
- Star Trek: Voyager season 4

"Random Thoughts" is the 78th episode of the science fiction television series Voyager, the tenth episode of season four. On a spaceship making its way back to planet Earth, they stop by an alien planet. However, they become entangled in a legal proceeding due to the actions of the crew, and they must resolve it before proceeding on. This has been noted as exploration of what it means to control emotions, as often shows have the format of a morality play in the context of science fiction adventure.

This episode was written by Kenneth Biller and directed by Alexander Singer, it aired on UPN on November 19, 1997.

== Plot ==
The Federation starship Voyager is orbiting the Mari homeworld, a race of telepaths. As the ship's crew trade for supplies, they find it difficult to haggle and bargain with Mari mind readers. Meanwhile, Lt Commander Tuvok and the city's Chief Examiner Nimira discuss security and maintaining order. Nimira's job is becoming obsolete since there has been no violence in Mari society for years. Tuvok offers to transport her aboard Voyager to demonstrate Starfleet security enforcement. While Captain Janeway and B'Elanna Torres are negotiating for a resonator coil, someone bumps into Torres, momentarily angering her. She calms herself, shrugging it off as an accident. Moments later, they find the man who had bumped into Torres beating another man severely. When Janeway stops the aggressor, he expresses surprise at his own behaviour.

While aboard Voyager, Nimira is puzzled by the ship's brig and the concept of incarceration as a form of punishment. She is called back to the surface to investigate the attack, and determines that Torres's angry thought had been transmitted telepathically to the aggressor, making Torres a guilty party. Torres and the aggressor are both sentenced to undergo memory modification to remove the thought. Janeway protests, since this carries the risk of neurological damage. Another violent attack soon occurs with the same memory. Tuvok discovers that the salesman of the resonator coil has engaged in illicit memory trade. Torres's memory had been goaded from her for resale, but it was too violent to be contained, causing the outbursts among the Mari. Due to the new evidence, Torres is released moments before her brain is probed. Nimira is shocked to learn that all thoughts of violence have not disappeared from her people.

Later, Seven of Nine urges the Captain not to visit foreign worlds to avoid such dangerous complications. Janeway rejects this suggestion, saying that Voyager was built for the purpose of exploration.

== Notes ==
Nimira's actress, Gwynyth Walsh, was also attracted to the thought-provoking nature of the episode. Shortly after working on the installment, she related, "From my perspective, the episode certainly seemed to be dealing with the censorship issue, which is especially prevalent in the United States right now. The American Far Right [lobby] has a lot of control over what is on television these days, and I think the script attempts to explore the potential negatives of that kind of censorship.

When Tuvok and Guill conduct a mind-meld to exchange violent thoughts, the dream sequence shows images from other episodes and Paramount Pictures productions at the time: for a short moment a scene from the film Event Horizon is visible.

== Reception ==
In 2017, an article on Medium suggested that this was a worthwhile episode of the series for kids to watch, because it shows the importance of a person controlling their emotions.

In 2020, Tor.com rated this 9 out 10, remarking "..this is a strong, powerful Trek episode that beautifully does what Trek does best." and praised the script, characters, and acting.

== Releases ==
In 2017, the complete Star Trek: Voyager television series was released in a DVD box set with special features.
