= Cultural depictions of Henry V of England =

Cultural depictions of Henry V of England have been portrayed in a wide variety of cultural works, ranging from Shakespeare's influential play Henry V (1599) to modern films, television dramas, novels, and musical compositions. His image as a warrior-king and national hero, shaped most prominently by Shakespeare, has played a central role in English cultural identity. These depictions often emphasize his leadership during the Hundred Years' War and the Battle of Agincourt, though some modern interpretations also highlight the darker or more complex aspects of his reign.

== Literature ==
- Henry V is the subject of the eponymous play by William Shakespeare, which largely concentrates on his campaigns in France.
- He is also a central character in Henry IV, Part 1 and Henry IV, Part 2, where Shakespeare dramatises him as "Prince Hal", a wanton youth. According to some critics, "Henry IV is about Henry IV in name alone - it's really a coming-of-age story, charting the young, rebellious Hal's attempt to wrestle with responsibility".
- He appears in Falstaff's Wedding (1760) by William Kenrick, a sequel to Henry IV, Part 2.
- Henry appears in Simon the Coldheart (1925), a novel by Georgette Heyer.
- Wife to Henry V (1957) by Hilda Lewis focuses on Catherine of Valois' relationship with Henry.
- Royal Sword At Agincourt (1971), a novel by Pamela Bennetts, focuses on Henry's relationship with Catherine of Valois.
- Fortune Made His Sword by Martha Rofheart (1971, UK Title Cry God For Harry) is a novel about Henry's career.
- Ellis Peters's novel A Bloody Field by Shrewsbury (1972, US title The Bloody Field) revolves around the relationship between Henry V, his father Henry IV and Hotspur.
- The novels The Star of Lancaster (1981) and The Queen's Secret by Jean Plaidy both feature Henry as a character.
- The novel Good King Harry (1984) by Denise Giardina purports to be Henry's account of his life.
- Azincourt (published in the US as Agincourt, 2008) by Bernard Cornwell, has its hero receive instructions from Henry.

== Film ==
Henry has been portrayed on screen by:

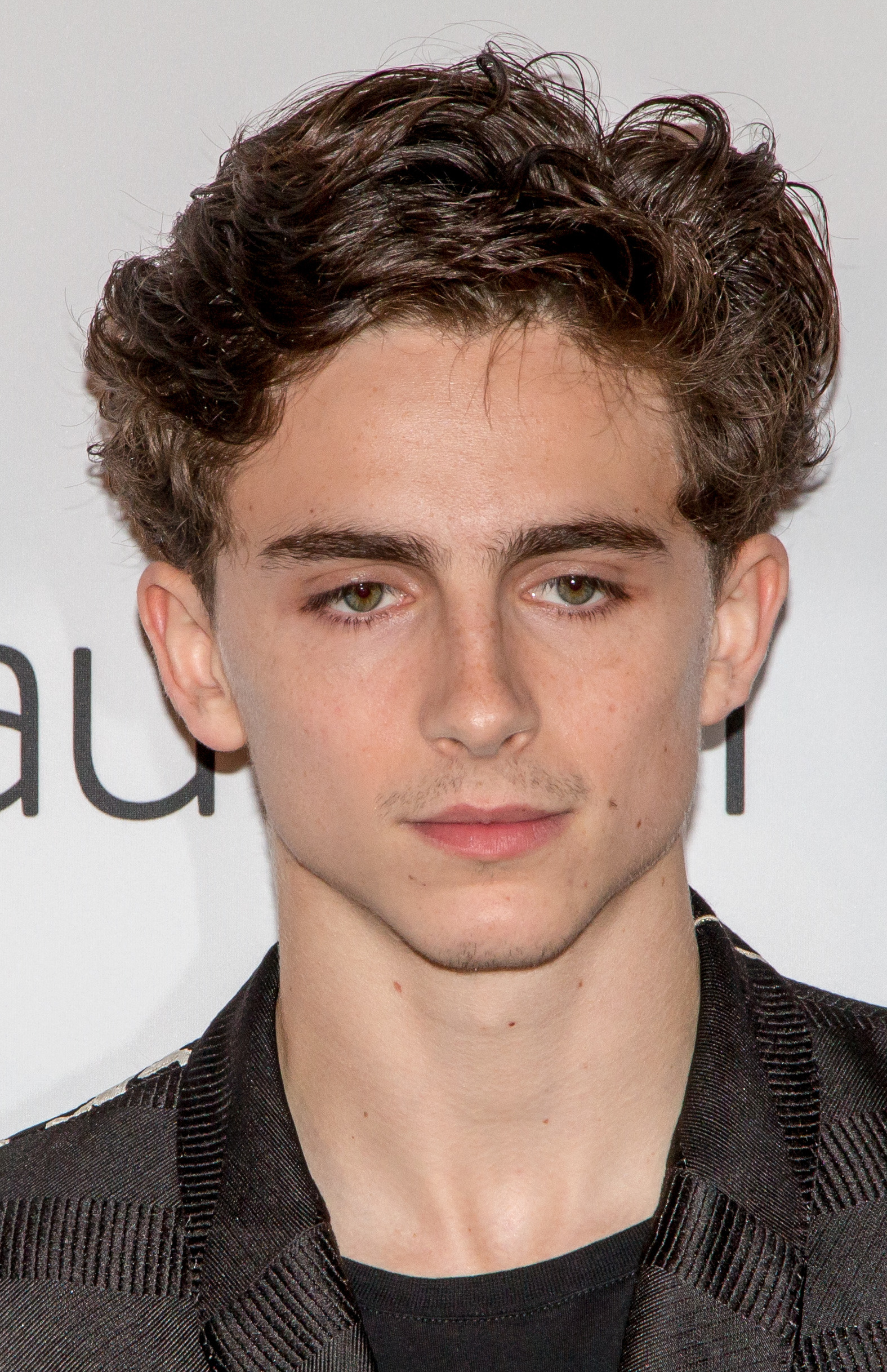
Timothée Chalamet portraying Henry V in The King (2019)

- Matheson Lang in Royal Cavalcade (1935).
- Laurence Olivier in Shakespeare's Henry V (1944), for which he was nominated for the Academy Award for Best Actor. The film was nominated for a total of four regular Oscars, including Best Picture and won a Special Award for Olivier, in recognition of "his outstanding achievement as actor, producer and director in bringing Henry V to the screen".
- Dan O'Herlihy in The Black Shield of Falworth (1954), with Tony Curtis
- Keith Baxter in Orson Welles' Chimes at Midnight (1965), a merger of several Shakespeare plays which focuses on the relationship between young Prince Hal and his mentor, John Falstaff
- Kenneth Branagh in Shakespeare's Henry V (1989), reprising his stage role with the Royal Shakespeare Company and for which he was nominated for the Academy Award for Best Actor and Best Director and the BAFTA Award for Best Actor in a Leading Role
- Timothée Chalamet in The King (2019), a modern adaptation of Shakespeare's plays Henry IV, Parts 1 & 2 and Henry V

== Television ==
Henry has been portrayed a number of times on television, mainly in versions of Shakespeare's plays. He has been played by:

- Robert Hardy in the BBC series An Age of Kings (1960), which contained all the history plays from Richard II to Richard III
- Lars Lind in Henrik IV (1964), a Swedish version of Henry IV
- David Gwillim in the BBC Shakespeare versions of both parts of Henry IV and Henry V (1979)
- Michael Pennington in the BBC series The Wars of the Roses (1989), which included all of Shakespeare's history plays performed by the English Shakespeare Company
- Jonathan Firth in a BBC film, Henry IV (1995), a version of Shakespeare's plays
- Martin Clunes in the BBC humorous film The Nearly Complete and Utter History of Everything (1999)
- Tom Hiddleston in the BBC's The Hollow Crown series of television films including: Henry IV - Part 1, Henry IV - Part 2, and Henry V (2012).

== Comics ==
The medieval-set comic strip The Hammer Man, (which ran in the British comic The Victor) often featured Henry V as the commander of the strip's hero, Chell Puddock.

== Video games ==
King Henry V is a non-playable character in the video game Bladestorm: The Hundred Years' War, in which he is a primary backing ally to the renowned Black Prince of England.

The video game Age of Empires II: The Conquerors featured Henry V as a paladin.

Henry is a playable character in the Mobile/PC Game Rise of Kingdoms.
