= Jason Charles =

Jason Charles is a London-based novelist, playwright, short-story writer, and poet.

In February 2006 his play Steam performed to sold out houses and positive reviews at the White Bear Theatre. The play was revived the following year at the Barons Court Theatre where it did equally well. In April 2007 his play Rupture opened at the Kings Head Theatre, and in January 2008 his follow-up was Counterfeit Skin. The play starred Jamie Kristian, the son of New Seekers singer Marty Kristian, and Chris Grezo, and became one of the fastest selling shows at London's Courtyard Theatre. The play was revived there six months later with a cast including Garry Jenkins, Charlie Hollway and Gil Sutherland. Estranged, the first play Charles wrote, received its premiere at the same theatre in 2009 and starred Harry Macqueen in his first stage role after leaving drama school. Charles then adapted one of his unpublished novels for his next production, Beyond Flesh and Blood, a dark psychological piece that opened at London’s Tabard Theatre just one month after Estranged closed. In February 2014 Brett Garland staged a revival of "Estranged" at the Tap Gallery Theatre in Sydney, Australia. In October 2017 his debut novel The Claws of Time was published. The following year he published a collection of his short stories and poetry entitled The Flesh of God. In 2019 he published Throne of Thorns which is a play set in 1483 about Richard III becoming King of England after the death of his brother, Edward IV.

== His work to date includes ==
- Steam at the White Bear Theatre, London (2006)
- Steam at the Barons Court Theatre, London (2007)
- Rupture at the Kings Head Theatre, London (2007)
- Counterfeit Skin at the Courtyard Theatre Studio Space, London (2008)
- Counterfeit Skin at the Courtyard Theatre Main House, London (2008)
- Estranged at the Courtyard Theatre Main House, London (2009)
- Beyond Flesh and Blood at the Tabard Theatre, London (2009)
- Estranged at the Tap Gallery Theatre, Sydney (2014)
- The Claws of Time, novel (2017)
- The Flesh of God, collection of short stories and poetry (2018)
- Throne of Thorns, theatre play about King Richard III set in 1483 (2019)
- The Human Cage, anthology of poetry (2020)

Beyond Flesh and Blood, was a dark psychological study of a woman living with Dissociate Identity Disorder, exploring the themes of salvation, love, memory, sex, God and identity.

Estranged opened at the Tap Gallery theatre in Sydney, Australia, on 13 February 2014 for a ten night run.

His novel The Claws of Time is set in 2012 and concerns the plights of a former mistress of King Richard III and a tortured female singer-songwriter.

The Flesh of God is a collection of short stories and poems that centre around the themes of obsession, insanity, sexuality, and fleshly redemption.

Throne of Thorns is a play set in 1483 exploring how Richard III took the throne after the death of his brother. To date it is the only play written by Jason Charles that has never been performed.

The Human Cage is a collection of Jason Charles's poetry, described as abstract lyrical poems, focussing on depression and obsession.

== Critical reaction ==
=== Steam ===
Charles' first play, Steam, received favourable reaction: "Charles has a strong academic background in playwriting and it shows - Steam’s structure is neat and nicely balanced, even if he occasionally struggles to get his characters on and off stage with the naturalism the set-up otherwise demands. He has a fine ear for dialogue, and for all the sex talk the play is never crass." While The Spectator described it as "a powerful début, a psychological thriller with moments of high comedy"

=== Counterfeit Skin ===
Charles' second play was Counterfeit Skin.

Natalie Bennett at MyLondonYourLondon gave it a positive review stating: "It may be some time before I see a show like this on Shaftesbury Avenue, which is a pity.". Rainbow Network were also positive, praising the skilled writing "what starts out as a light comedy soon takes a dark turn - skeletons come clattering out of closets and before you know it Counterfeit Skin has become a tale of infidelity, rampant masochism and potential violence - certainly not a show for the faint hearted.". And BOYZ described the play as "so observant that it’s not a matter of identifying with one character, but with aspects of all of them. Jason Charles has created characters that are believable and tragic without allowing them to become caricatures. Overall Counterfeit Skin takes a bunch of unhealthy and destructive relationships and throws them under the microscope before picking them to pieces."

Another favourable reaction came from Sheila Cornelius in My Cultural Life magazine: "Sparkling dialogue is the trademark of Jason Charles, whose previous play ‘Steam’ played to sold-out houses and rave reviews. If the first half of the play seems to be a light-hearted comedy, the second part darkens into a psychological thriller as Jake allows full rein to his fantasies, which Mach is only too happy to indulge as he increasingly falls for the handsome idler. Things escalate to breaking point as Mach realises that Jake’s commitment phobia is not about to change. After a nerve-wracking denouement, adjustments are made all round and Leo is arguably set for a future which may be bleak but is more firmly rooted in reality. "

=== Estranged ===
Reviews for Estranged were on the whole positive. In its four star review the Pink Paper praised the play for being a "sharp, snappy observation on family dysfunction, played out against frequently cringing laughs and wincing one-liners". Phil Willmott for Rainbow Network praised Charles' writing technique noting that "Jason Charles is an obviously talented writer. He has the rare ability to detonate the scenarios he sets up in funny and engaging ways. His last play, Counterfeit Skin, was a top seller at this same venue and I always look forward to seeing his work. He’s also a romantic at heart and you always leave one of his plays with a belief in the redemptive power of love, even when it eludes the central characters." While Extra Extra recommended the play as a fun night out "Jason Charles has successfully created six individual characters with such different motives, backgrounds and relationships that it is astonishing how much we are able to learn about each character in such a short period of time. Just like some of the outlandish characters, this play was a lot of fun. It was funny yet tense and touched upon some incredibly important issues such as being tied down by family and needing to desperately be free. For a night when you want to get away from your own family problems, Estranged can show you a family that is bound to be more dysfunctional than your own." QX Magazine gave the play a 4 star rating describing it as "unaccountably satisfying" and enjoying the "killer one-liners" and the Islington Gazette enthused that the play is "bursting with talent" and that "Jason Charles turns the microscope on the fear and the inner turmoil of his characters and just like the cast he is fresh on the London stage." In February 2014 the play was enjoyed by an Australian audience at Sydney's Tap Gallery theatre - "The plot twists in Estranged make the family dramas of Dallas look like the Brady Bunch. Nothing is sacred, and it makes for very entertaining theatre. A fun night out, try not to miss this."

=== Beyond Flesh and Blood ===
Richard Langton from the Chiswick Times praised Beyond Flesh and Blood which he described as a "play of ideas." He recommended that the audience: "Expect the unexpected, leave some prejudices behind and you'll have a rewarding eighty minutes."
