= Richardus Tertius =

Richardus Tertius is a play written in Latin about King Richard III by Thomas Legge. The play was acted by the students of St. John's College, Cambridge in 1579. It was possibly seen by two of the University Wits in Cambridge at the time: Christopher Marlowe and Robert Greene.

The play was never printed in its historical era (in fact, not until 1844); but it survives in nine manuscripts, and is thought to have been well known in its time. Scholars have studied the relationships between Richardus Tertius and the later plays about Richard III, the anonymous play The True Tragedy of Richard III (printed 1594) and Shakespeare's Richard III. In one view, the unknown author of The True Tragedy used Legge's play occasionally as a source, but Shakespeare did not.
