= Thomas Legge =

16th/17th-century English educator and playwright

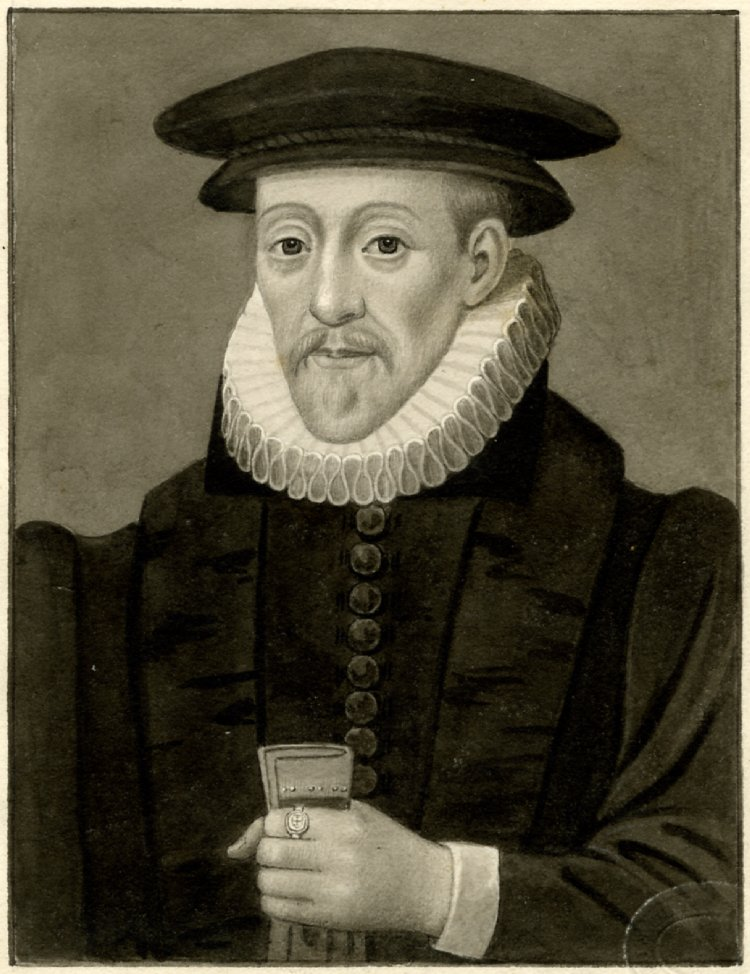
Portrait of Legge by Silvester Harding

Thomas Legge (/lɛɡ/; 1535 – 12 July 1607) was an English educator and playwright, prominently known for his play Richardus Tertius, which is considered to be the first history play written in England.

== Early life and education ==
Legge was the second of three sons born to Stephen and Margaret Legge in 1535. Originally from Norwich, Legge moved to Cambridge in 1552 where he matriculated to Corpus Christi College . Soon after he moved again to attend Trinity College, where he received a B.A. in 1556. He then went on to attend Oxford in 1566, where he received his master's degree.

== Career ==
In 1568, Legge became a member of the faculty at Jesus College, Cambridge, where he was known to be an active tutor and a proponent of the old way of thinking in religious matters.

On 27 June 1573, Legge was appointed master of Caius College, taking many students from Jesus College with him when he left. While in office at Caius, Legge stirred up trouble by promoting John Depup, M.A. to a fellowship, which Dr. Caius disagreed with because of Depup's leanings towards Catholic opinions. Legge was also accused of treating letters sent from the queen with contempt, and was charged with misappropriating college funds, a charge that was later settled within the administrative officials of the school.

Legge occupied many different positions at Caius, becoming commissary to the university in May 1579, and spent two separate terms, from 1587 to 1588 and from 1592 to 1593, as the vice-chancellor.

== Death and estate ==
Legge died on 12 July 1607 and was buried in Caius College Chapel. In his will, he left money to Caius College, which was used to build up the north side of the front court of the school.

== Plays ==
Legge is best known for his three-act Latin tragedy of Richardus Tertius or Richard III, which was performed at St John's College in 1579. This work is alluded to by Sir John Harington in his Brief Apologie of Poetry as a famous tragedy of this time, and is believed to be the play Cambridge men asked Lord Burghley's permission to substitute in 1592-1593 for the English comedy the queen had requested.

It is believed that this play was written based on information Legge took from Sir Thomas More's biography of Richard III. Because of this, Legge created a Richard who was not deformed and bitter at the world that rejected him, as with the Richard III made famous by Shakespeare, but rather an intelligent man with his own motives and agenda who uses everyone around him to get his way.

This play appears to be the first real history play written in England, and Legge changed the course of English drama by relying on Holinshed's chronicles as background to his play. Legge is also believed to have written a play about the Destruction of Jerusalem around 1577 that was taken from him before it could be made public.

Academic offices
Preceded by Robert Some	Vice-Chancellor of the University of Cambridge; 1592-1592	Succeeded by John Still
Preceded by John Copcot	Vice-Chancellor of the University of Cambridge; 1587-1588	Succeeded by Thomas Nevile
Preceded by John Caius	Master of Gonville and Caius College; 1573-1609	Succeeded by William Branthwaite
